= The Henry Ford =

Museum complex in Dearborn, Michigan

- Edison Institute; Greenfield Village and Henry Ford Museum
- U.S. National Register of Historic Places
- U.S. National Historic Landmark District
- Michigan State Historic Site
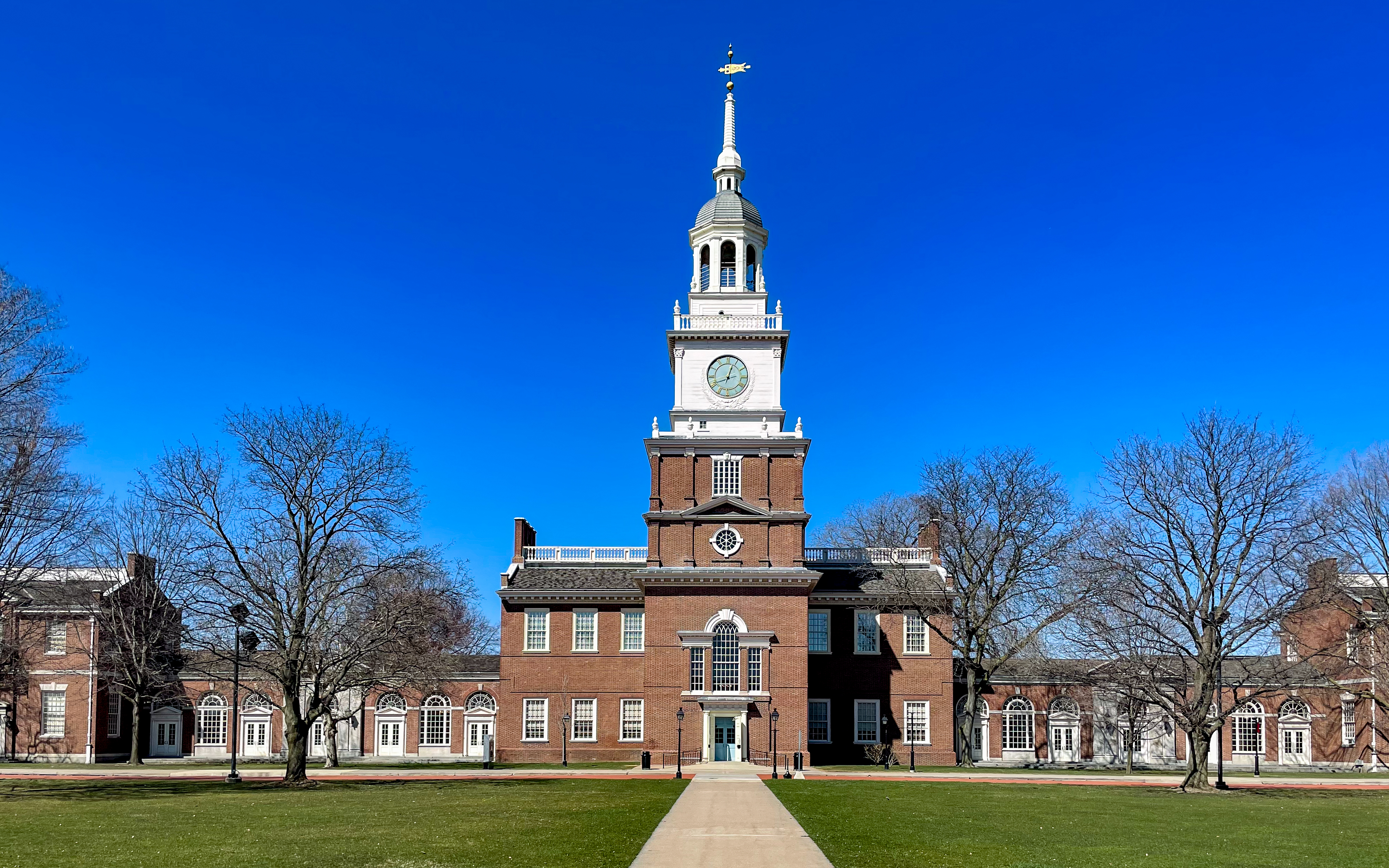
- The museum clock tower. The building is a replica of Independence Hall in Philadelphia.

- Location within Michigan Location within the United States
- Interactive map
- Location: The Henry Ford; 20900 Oakwood Boulevard at Village Road; Dearborn, Michigan; United States
- Coordinates: 42°18′13″N 83°14′03″W
- Built: 1929; 97 years ago
- Architect: Robert O. Derrick
- Visitation: 1.7 million
- NRHP reference No.: 69000071

Significant dates
- Added to NRHP: October 20, 1969
- Designated NHLD: December 21, 1981

The Henry Ford (also known as the Henry Ford Museum of American Innovation and Greenfield Village, and as the Edison Institute) is a history museum complex in Dearborn, Michigan, United States, within Metro Detroit. The museum collection contains the presidential limousine of John F. Kennedy, Abraham Lincoln's chair from Ford's Theatre, Thomas Edison's laboratory, the Wright Brothers' bicycle shop, the Rosa Parks bus, and many other historical exhibits.

It is the largest indoor–outdoor museum complex in the United States and is visited by over 1.7 million people each year. It was listed on the National Register of Historic Places in 1969 as Greenfield Village and Henry Ford Museum and designated a National Historic Landmark in 1981 as "Edison Institute".

== Background ==
Named for its founder, the automobile industrialist Henry Ford, and based on his efforts to preserve items of historical interest and portray the Industrial Revolution, the property houses homes, machinery, exhibits, and Americana of historically significant items as well as common memorabilia, both of which help to capture the history of life in early America. It is one of the largest such collections in the nation.

Henry Ford said of his museum:

I am collecting the history of our people as written into things their hands made and used .... When we are through, we shall have reproduced American life as lived, and that, I think, is the best way of preserving at least a part of our history and tradition ...

== History ==
Architect Robert O. Derrick designed the museum with a 523,000 square feet (48,600 m^{2}) exhibit hall that extends 400 feet (120 m) behind the main façade. The façade spans 800 feet (240 m) and incorporates facsimiles of three structures from Independence National Historical Park in Philadelphia – Old City Hall, Independence Hall and Congress Hall.

The Edison Institute was dedicated by President Herbert Hoover to Ford's longtime friend Thomas Edison on October 21, 1929 – the 50th anniversary of the first successful incandescent light bulb. The attendees included Marie Curie, George Eastman, John D. Rockefeller, Will Rogers, Orville Wright, and about 250 others. The dedication was broadcast on radio with listeners encouraged to turn off their electric lights until the switch was flipped at the Museum.

The Edison Institute was, at first, a private site for educational purposes only, but after numerous inquiries about the complex, it was opened as a museum to the general public on June 22, 1933. It was originally composed of the Henry Ford Museum, Greenfield Village, and the Greenfield Village Schools (an experimental learning facility). Initially, Greenfield Village and the Henry Ford Museum were owned by the Ford Motor Company, which is currently a sponsor of the school and cooperates with the Henry Ford to provide the Ford Rouge Factory Tour. The Henry Ford is sited between the Ford Dearborn Development Center and several Ford engineering buildings with which it shares the same style gates and brick fences.

On August 9, 1970, the museum suffered a fire that destroyed the East Wing of the Mechanical Arts Hall that included a "Street of Shops" exhibit in Greenfield Village. Among the materials destroyed in the fire were a collection of Ford Motor Company production records. The same year, the museum purchased what it believed to be a 17th-century Brewster Chair, created for one of the Pilgrim settlers in the Plymouth Colony, for $9,000. In September 1977, the chair was determined to be a modern forgery created in 1969 by Rhode Island sculptor Armand LaMontagne. The museum retains the piece as an educational tool on forgeries.

In the early 2000s, the museum added an auditorium to the building's south corner. This housed an IMAX theater until January 2016 when museum management decided to change formats for the facility to better fit with its mission. The renovated theater reopened in April of that year.

== Henry Ford Museum of American Innovation ==
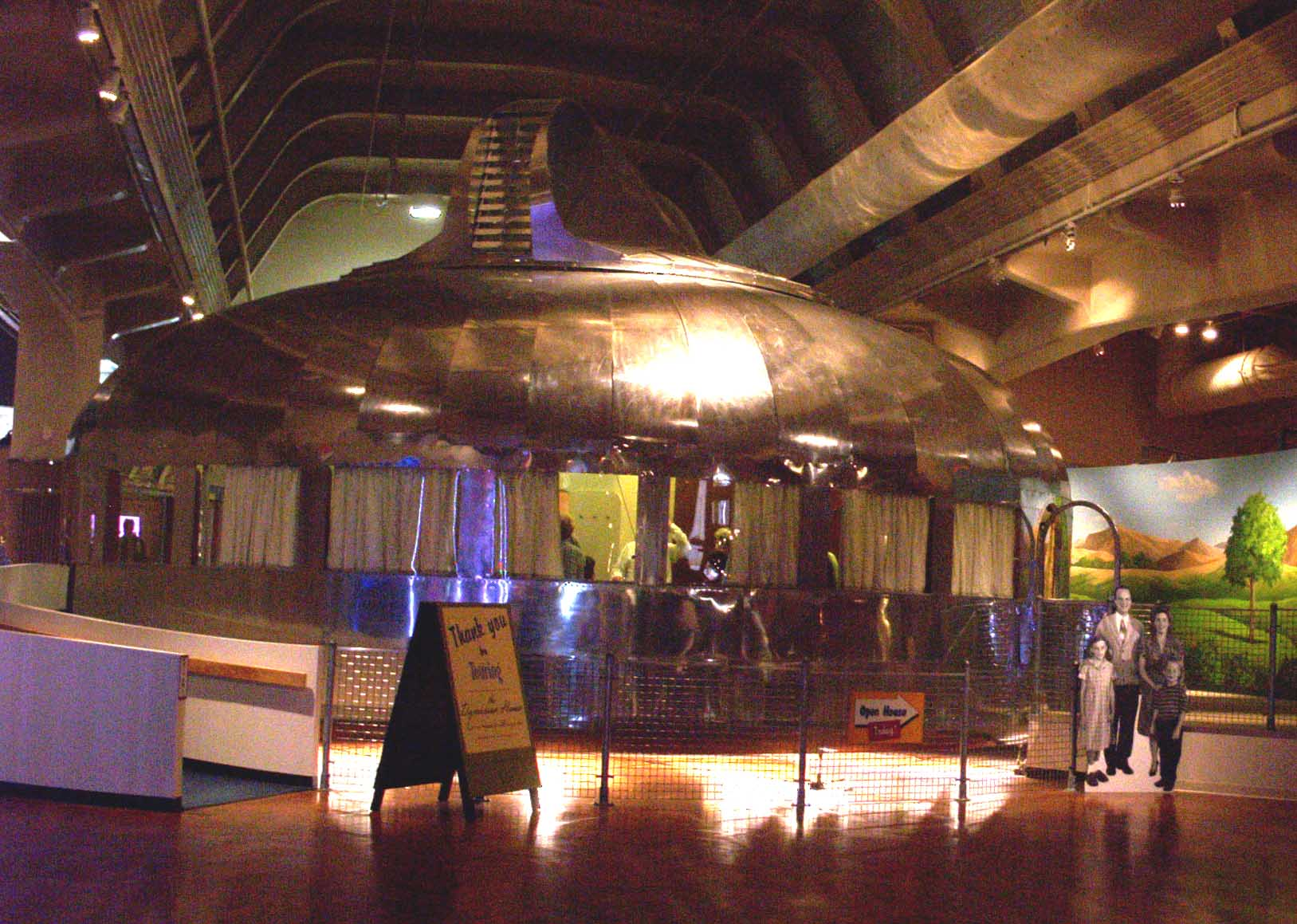
Buckminster Fuller's prototype Dymaxion house, in the Henry Ford Museum

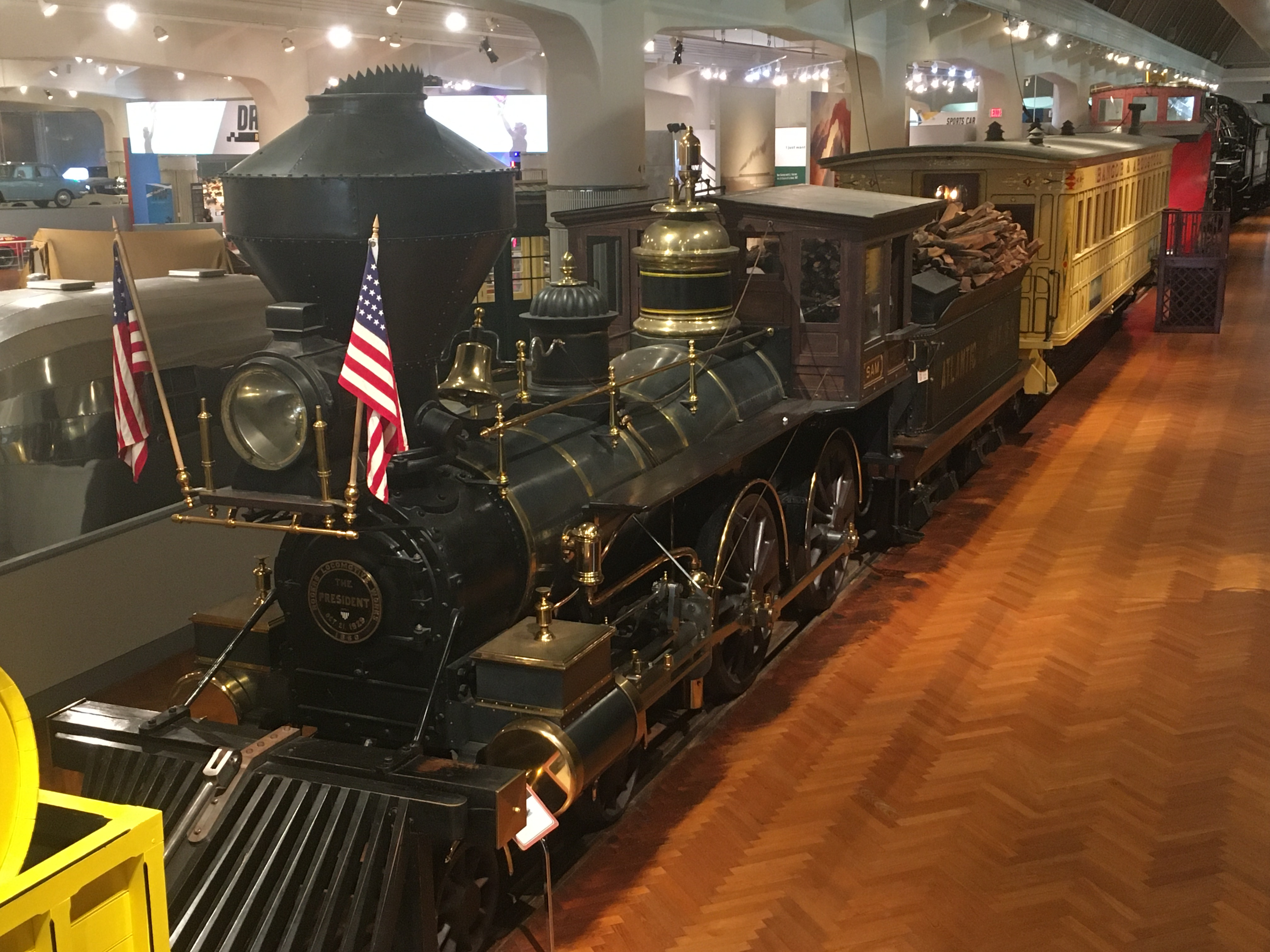
This 4-4-0 locomotive at the Henry Ford Museum was originally built in 1858 by Rogers Locomotive Works as the “Satilla” for the Atlantic & Gulf RR in Georgia. In 1924, Henry Ford had it restored in his Rouge Factory, and named it the “Sam Hill” in honor of an engineer that he admired as a boy. In 1929, the engine was renamed “The President” in honor of President Herbert Hoover, and it pulled Henry Ford, Thomas Edison and Hoover from Detroit to Dearborn, Michigan for the dedication ceremonies of the Henry Ford Museum.

The Henry Ford Museum of American Innovation began as Henry Ford's personal collection of historic objects, which he began collecting as far back as 1906. Today, the 12 acre (49,000 m^{2}) site is primarily a collection of antique machinery, pop culture items, automobiles, locomotives, aircraft, and other items:

- The museum features a 4K digital projection theater, which shows scientific, natural, or historical documentaries, as well as major feature films.
- An Oscar Mayer Wienermobile
- The 1961 Lincoln Continental, SS-100-X in which President John F. Kennedy was riding when he was assassinated.
- The rocking chair from Ford's Theatre in which President Abraham Lincoln was sitting when he was shot by John Wilkes Booth.
- George Washington's camp bed.
- A collection of several fine 17th- and 18th-century violins including a Stradivarius.
- Thomas Edison's alleged last breath in a sealed tube.
- Buckminster Fuller's prototype Dymaxion house.
- The bus on which Rosa Parks was arrested for refusing to give up her seat, leading to the Montgomery bus boycott.
- Igor Sikorsky's prototype helicopter.
- Fokker Trimotor airplane that flew the first flight over the North Pole.
- Bill Elliott's record-breaking race car clocking in at over 212 MPH at Talladega in 1987
- Fairbottom Bobs, the Newcomen engine
- A steam engine from Cobb's Engine House in England.
- A working fragment of the original Holiday Inn "Great Sign"
- Chesapeake & Ohio Railway 2-6-6-6 "Allegheny"-class steam locomotive #1601, built by Lima Locomotive Works in Lima, Ohio. The Allegheny was the third most-powerful steam locomotive ever built, after the Union Pacific Railroad "Big Boy" 4-8-8-4 locomotive and the Pennsylvania Railroad Q2-class 4-4-6-4 locomotive.
- Toyota Prius sedan, the first mass-produced hybrid vehicle.

Behind the scenes, the Benson Ford Research Center uses the resources of The Henry Ford, especially the photographic, manuscript and archival material which is rarely displayed, to allow visitors to gain a deeper understanding of American people, places, events, and things. The Research Center also contains the Ford Motor Archives.

To commemorate the 100th anniversary of the sinking of the RMS Titanic, the Henry Ford Museum exhibited a vast array of artifacts and media documenting the Titanic's voyage and demise. The exhibit was hosted from March 31 to September 30, 2012.

=== Selected exhibits ===
Airplanes

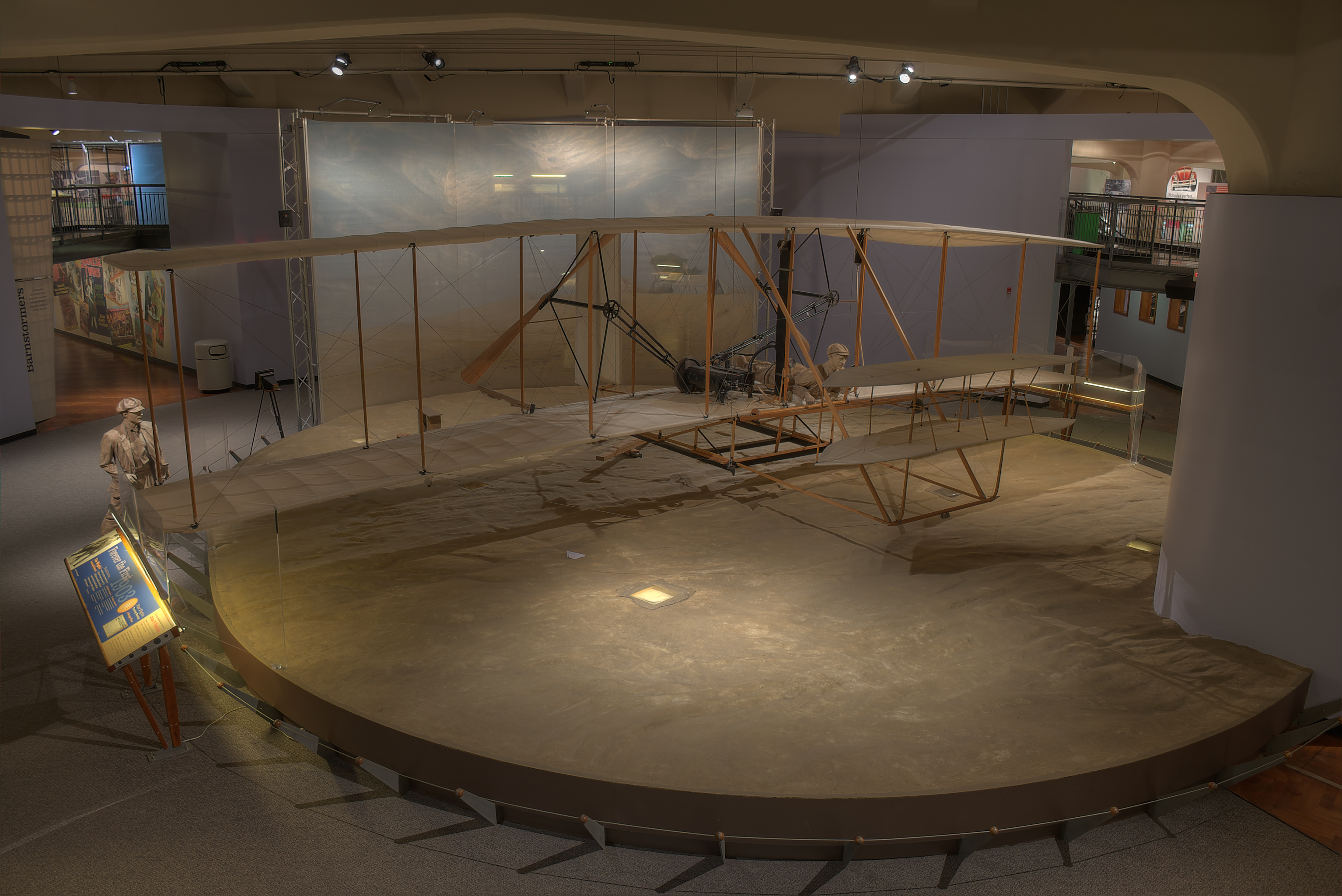
1903 Wright Flyer replica

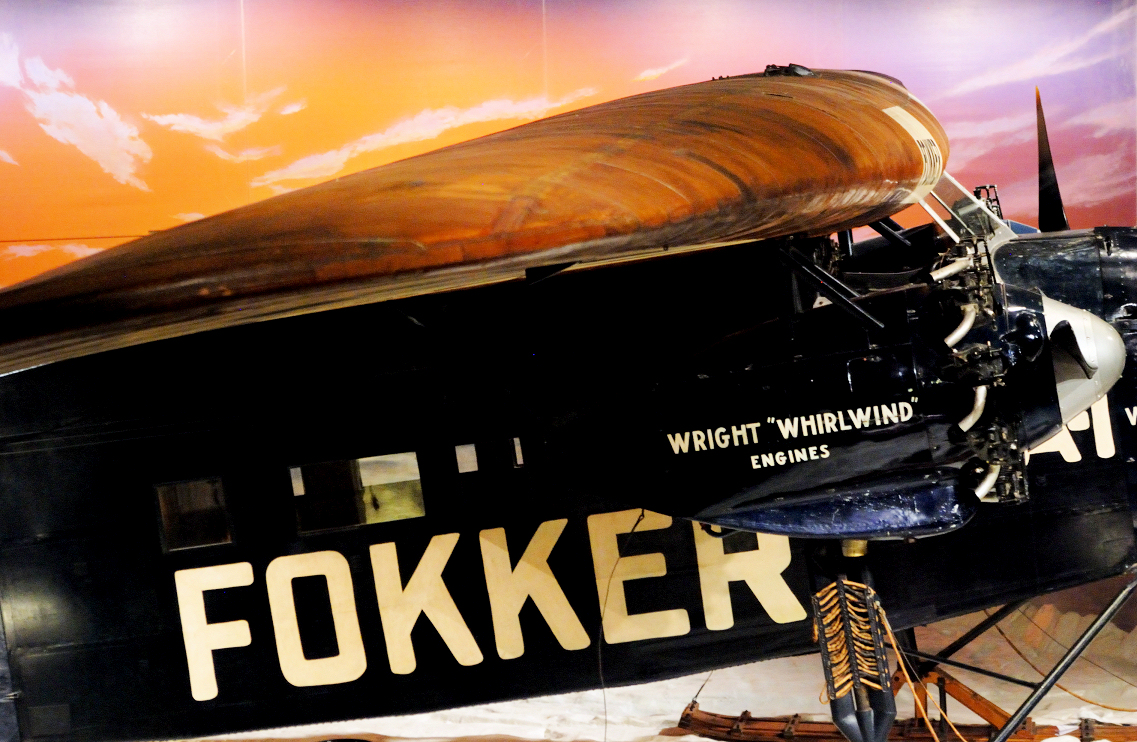
The 1926 Fokker F.VIIa/3M flown over the North Pole by Richard E. Byrd

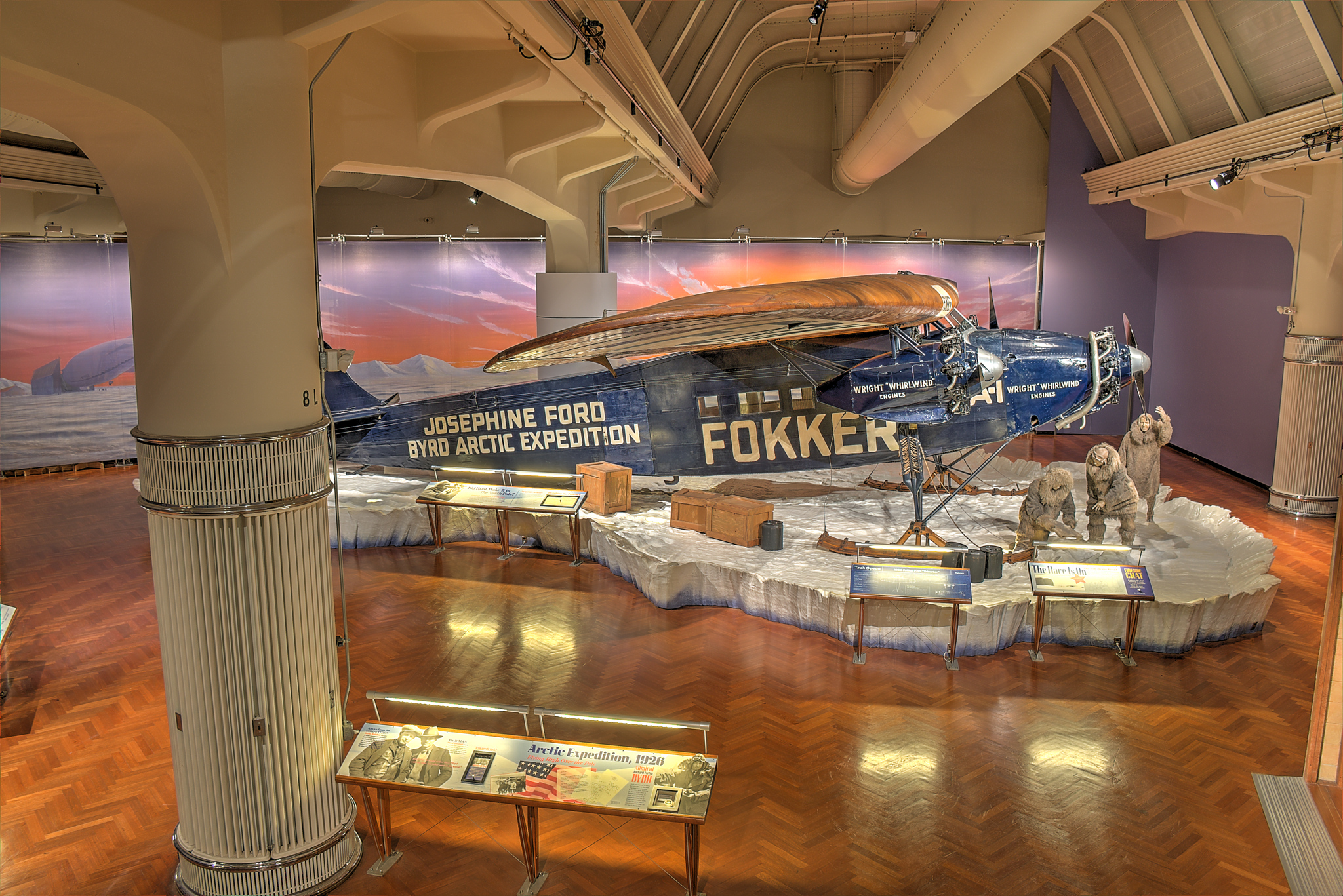
Byrd Arctic Expedition exhibit

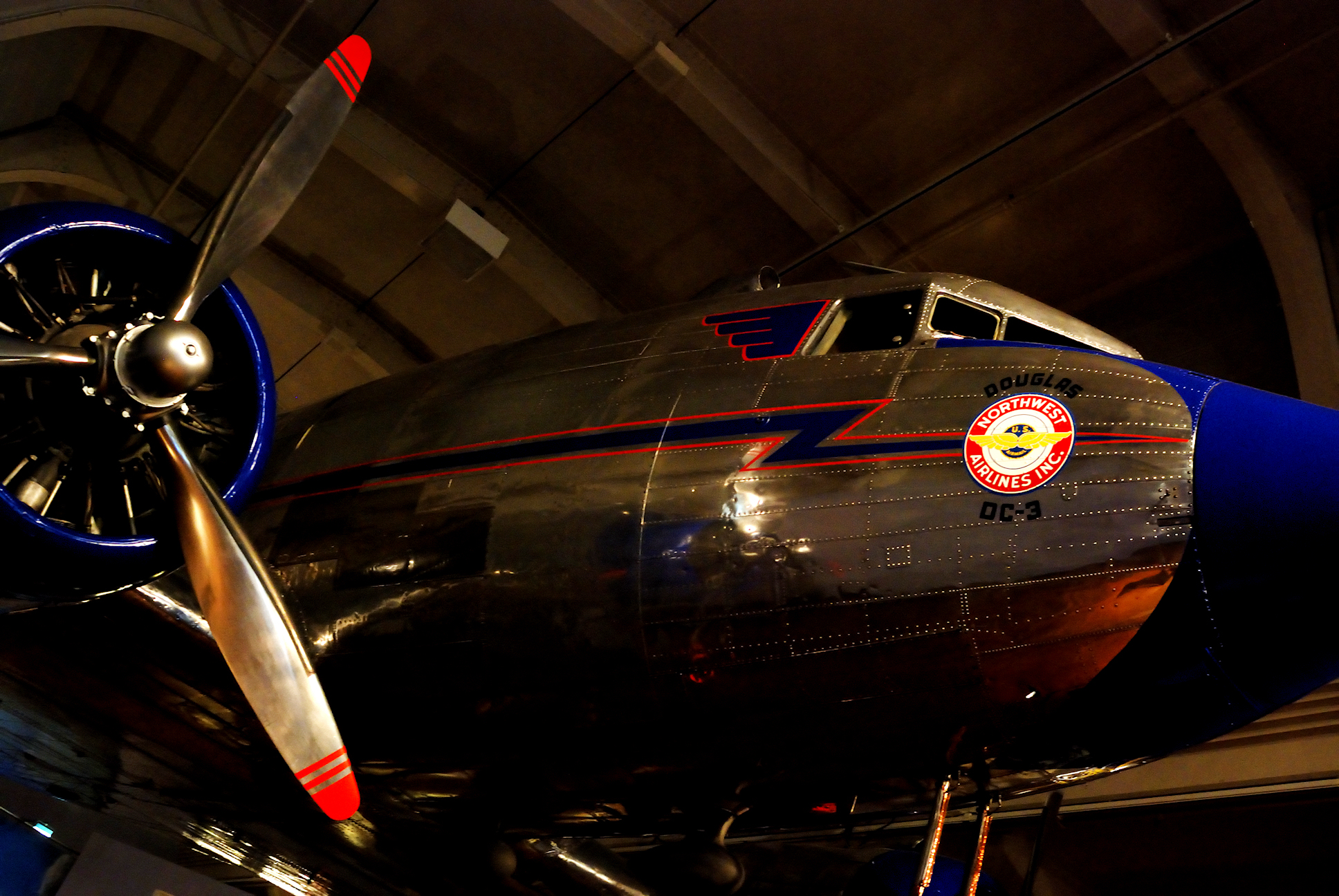
A 1939 Northwest Airlines Douglas DC-3
Agriculture

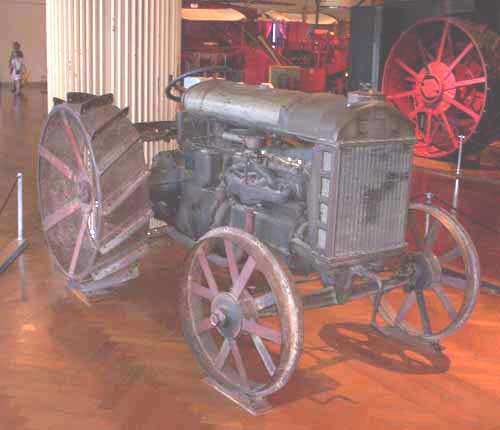
Fordson Tractor No. 1

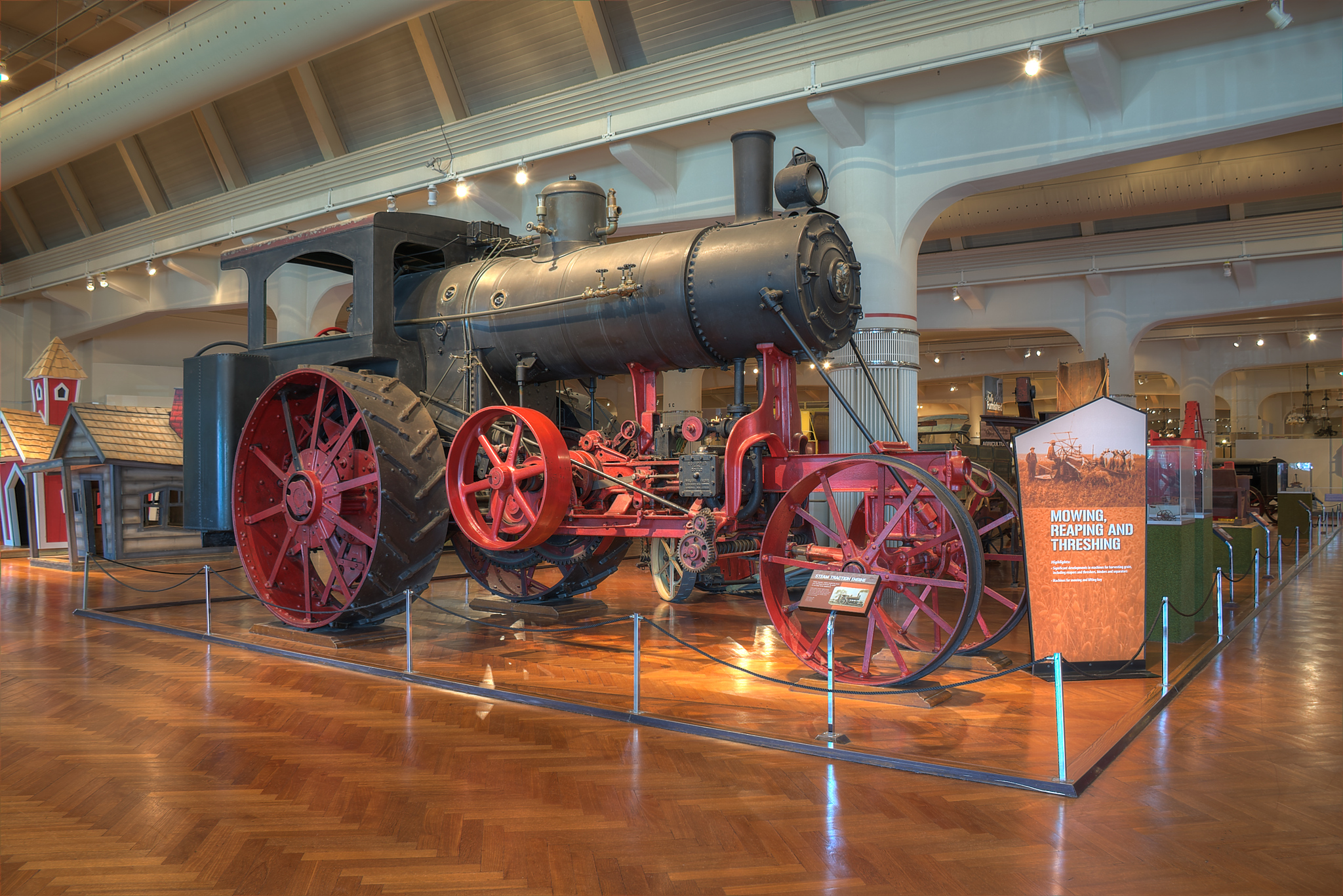
Steam Tractor Engine
Automobiles

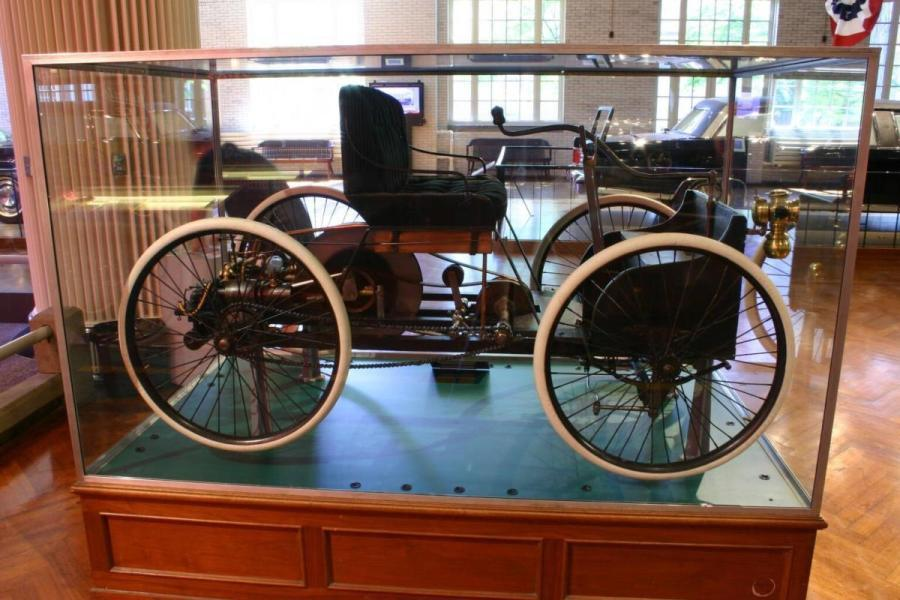
The 1896 Ford Quadricycle

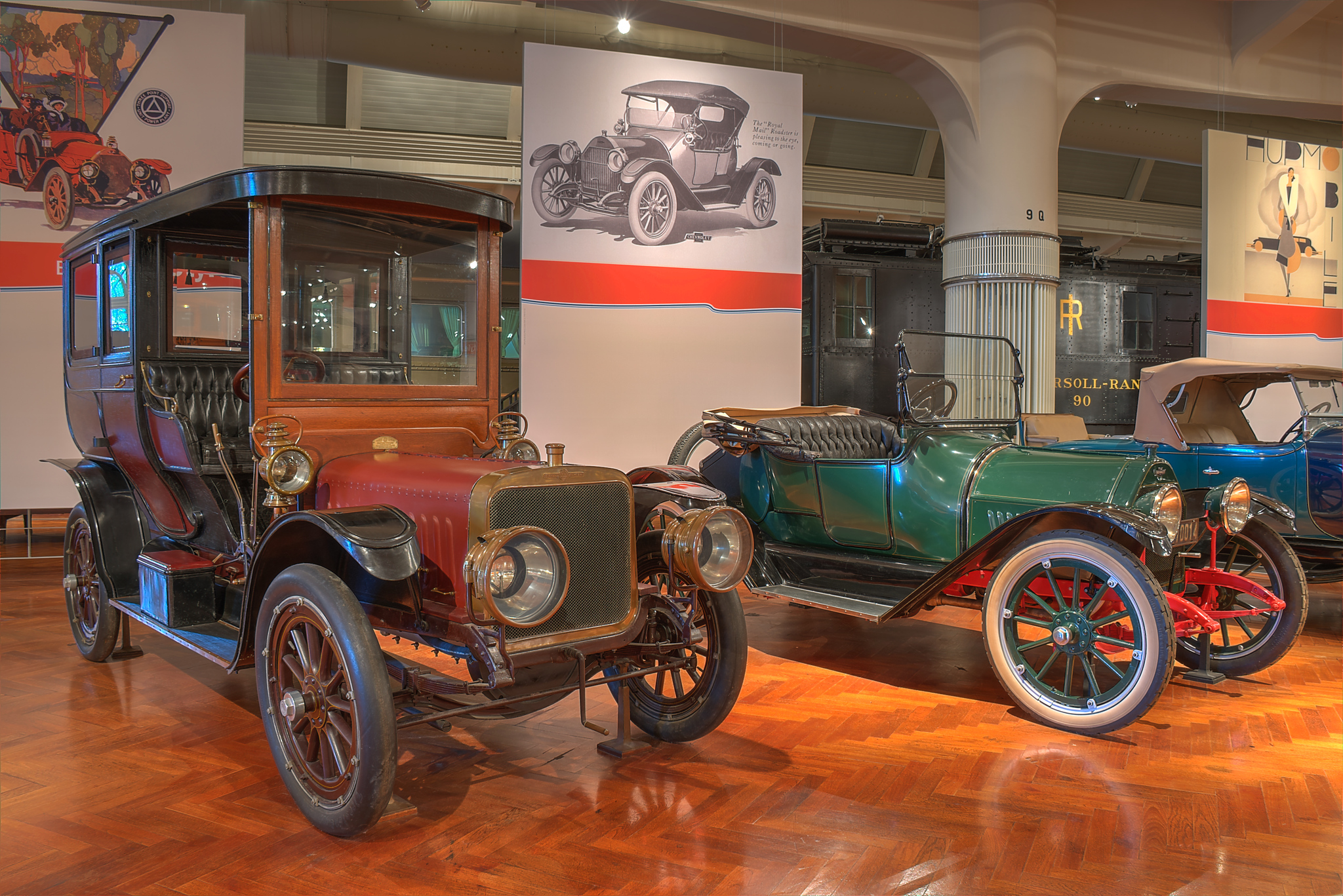
1908 Stevens-Duryea Model U limo (brown) and 1915 Chevrolet Royal Mail Roadster (green)

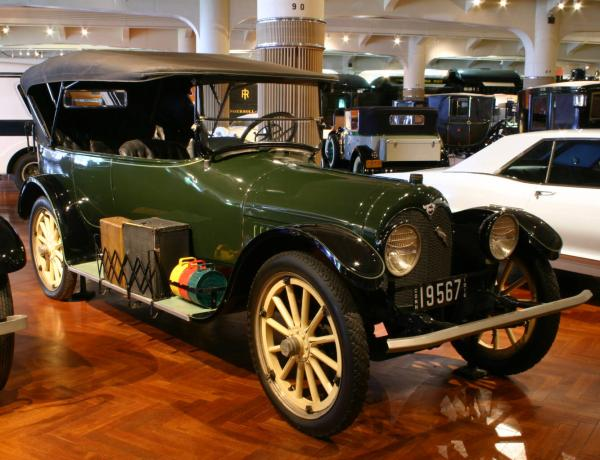
A 1916 Apperson Touring Car

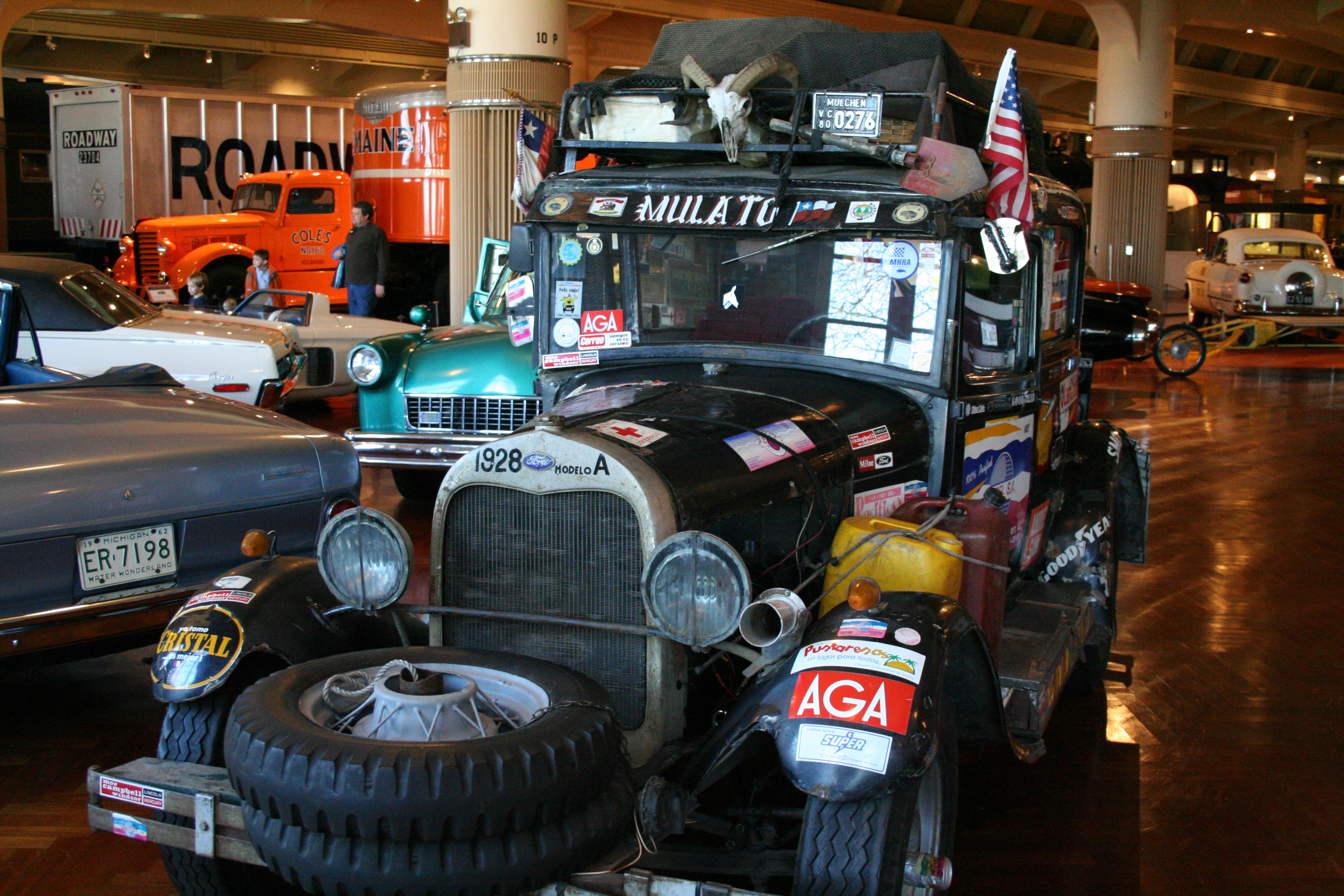
1928 Model A Ford

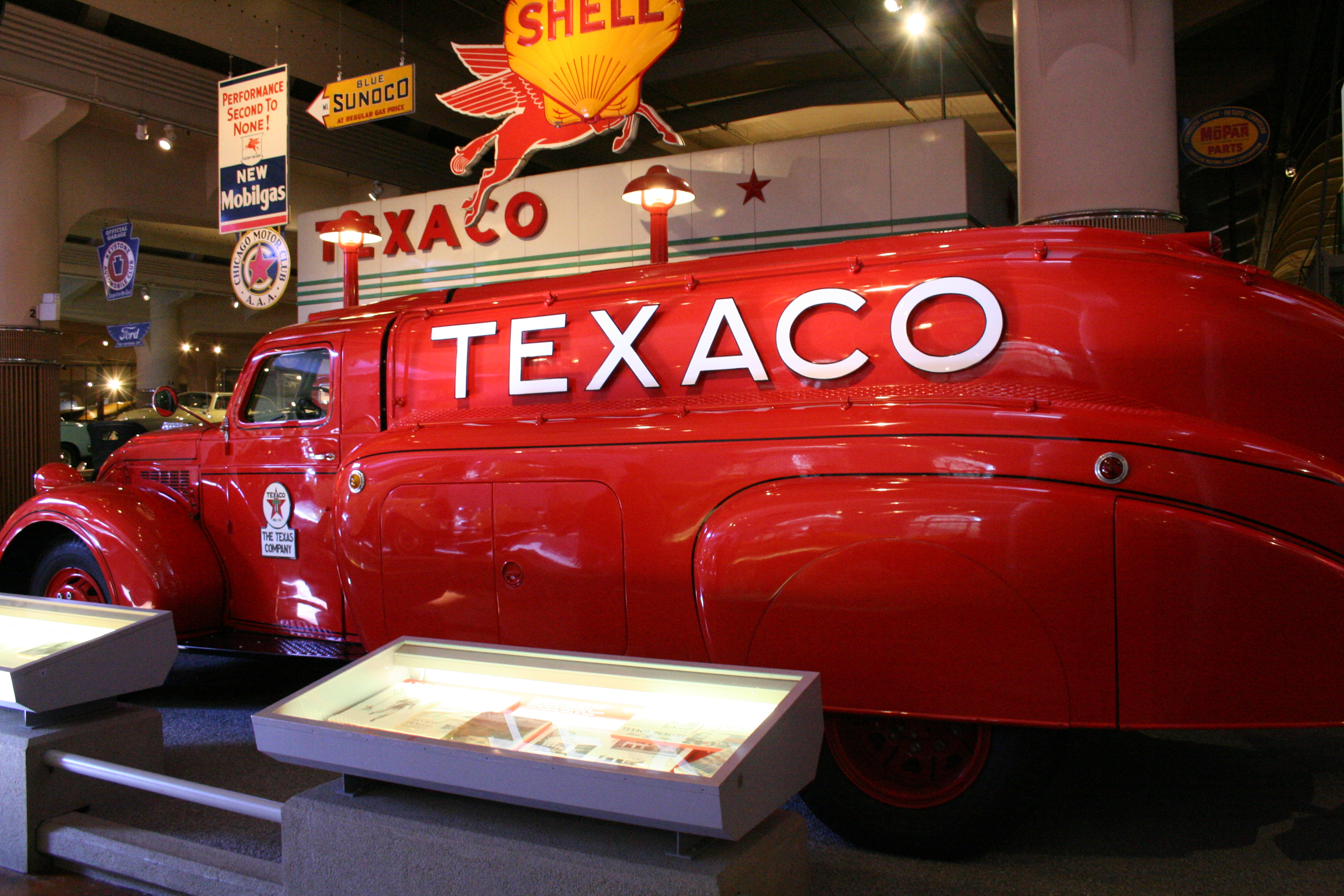
1939 Texaco tanker truck by Dodge

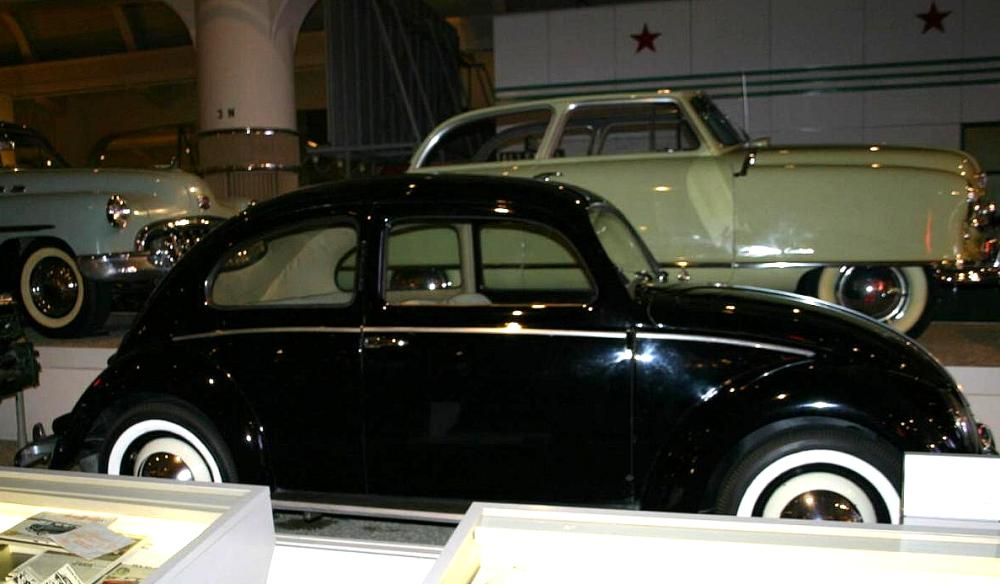
A 1949 Volkswagen

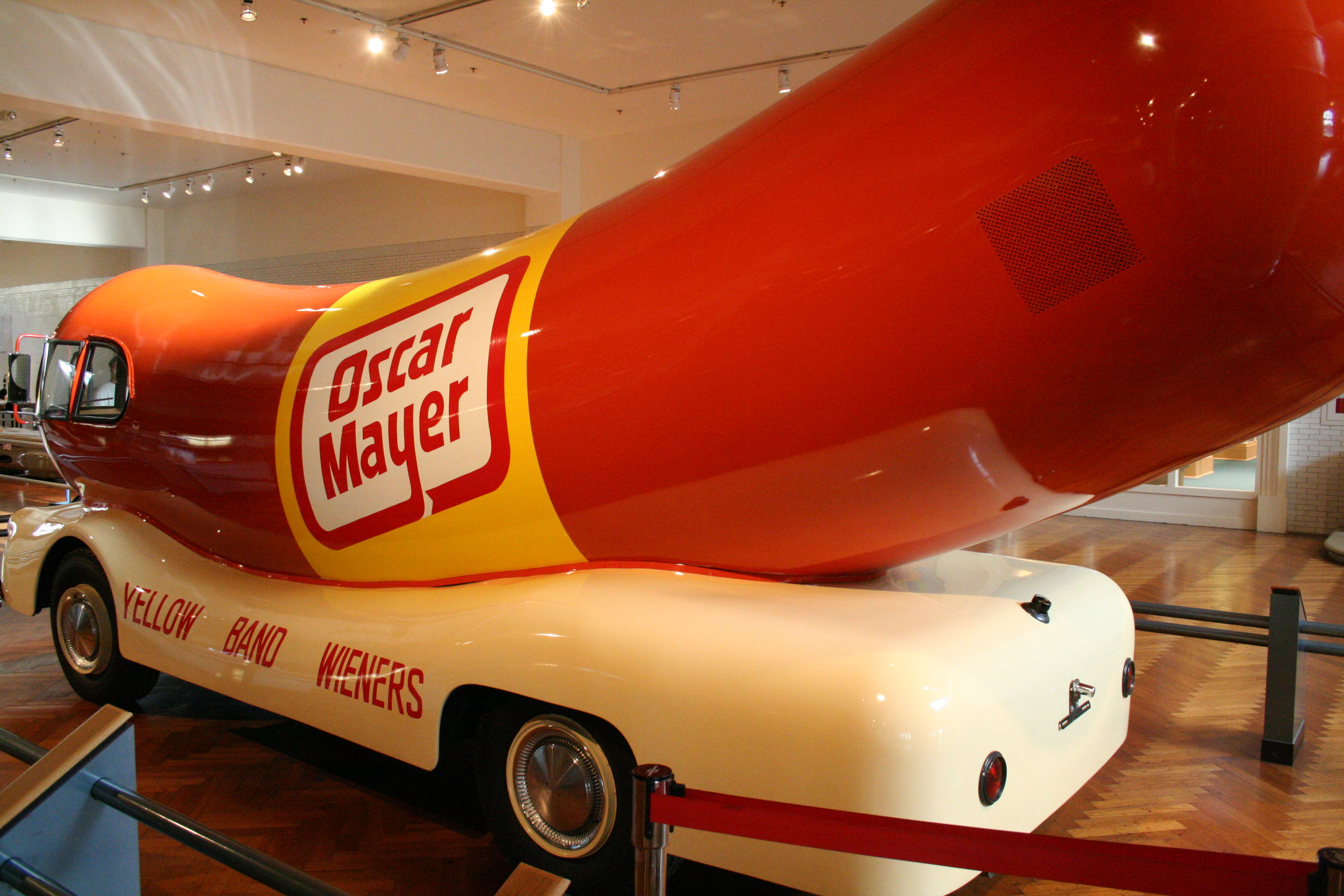
1952 Oscar Mayer Wienermobile

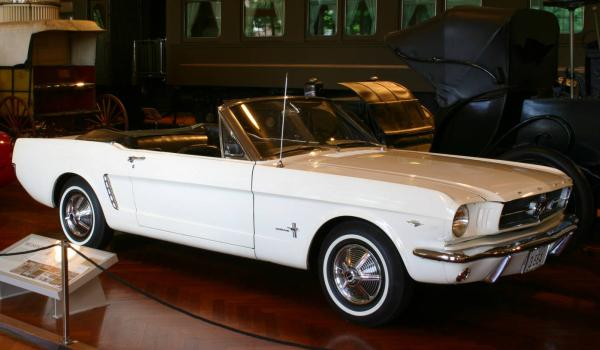
The first production built Ford Mustang

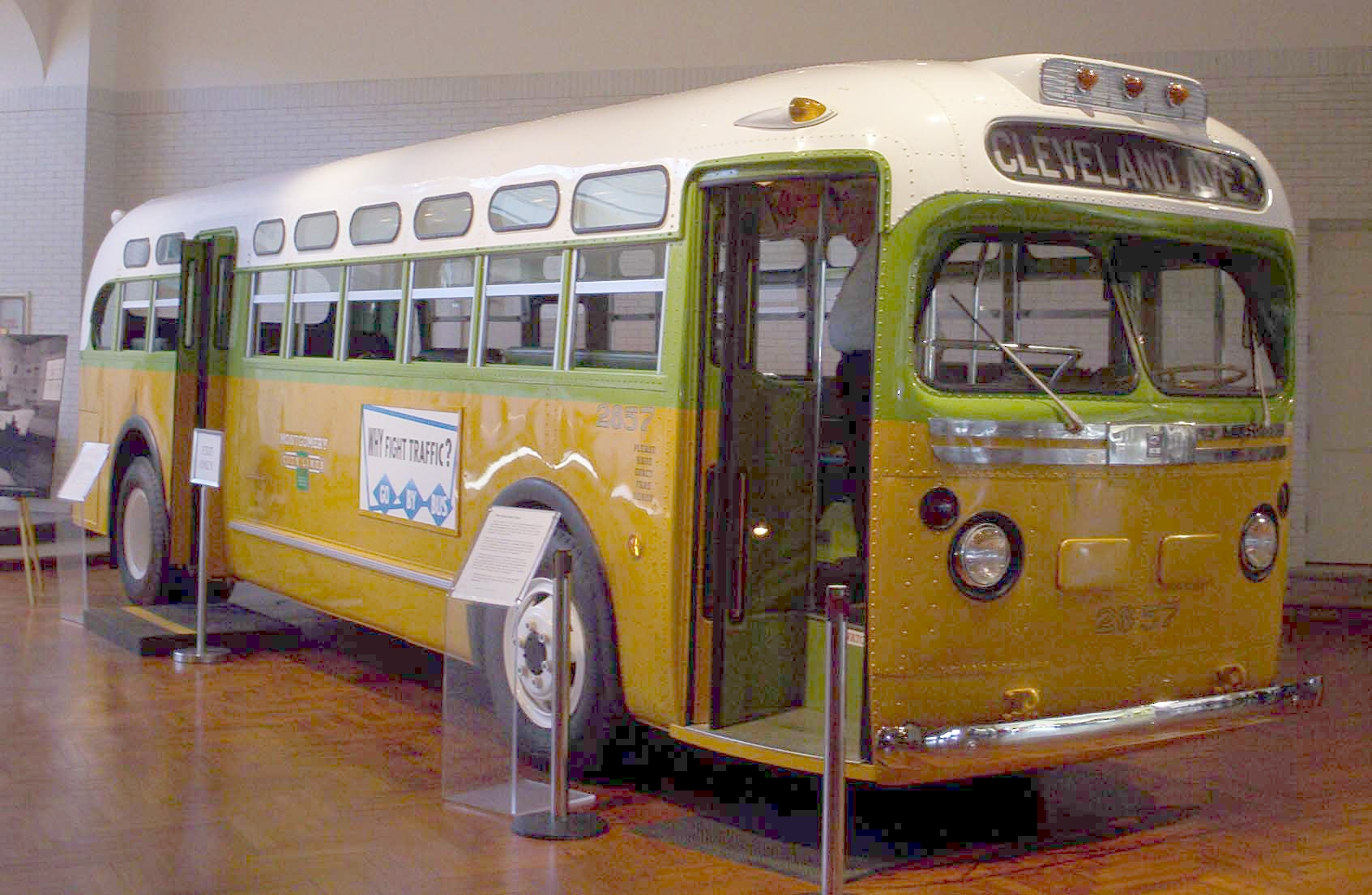
The bus on which Rosa Parks was arrested, an event which started the Montgomery bus boycott

External videos
- Tour of presidential vehicles on display, July 24, 2017, C-SPAN

Presidential limousines

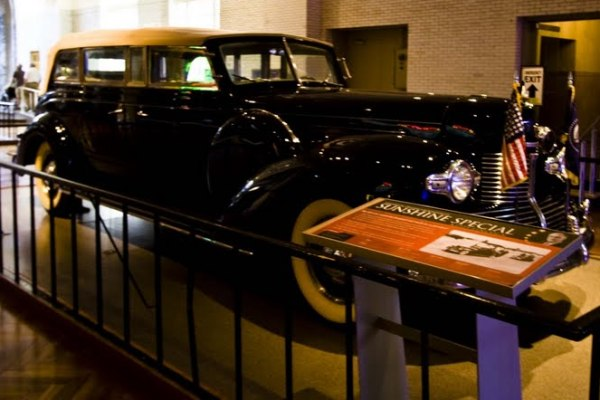
The Sunshine Special, the official state car used by US President Franklin D. Roosevelt

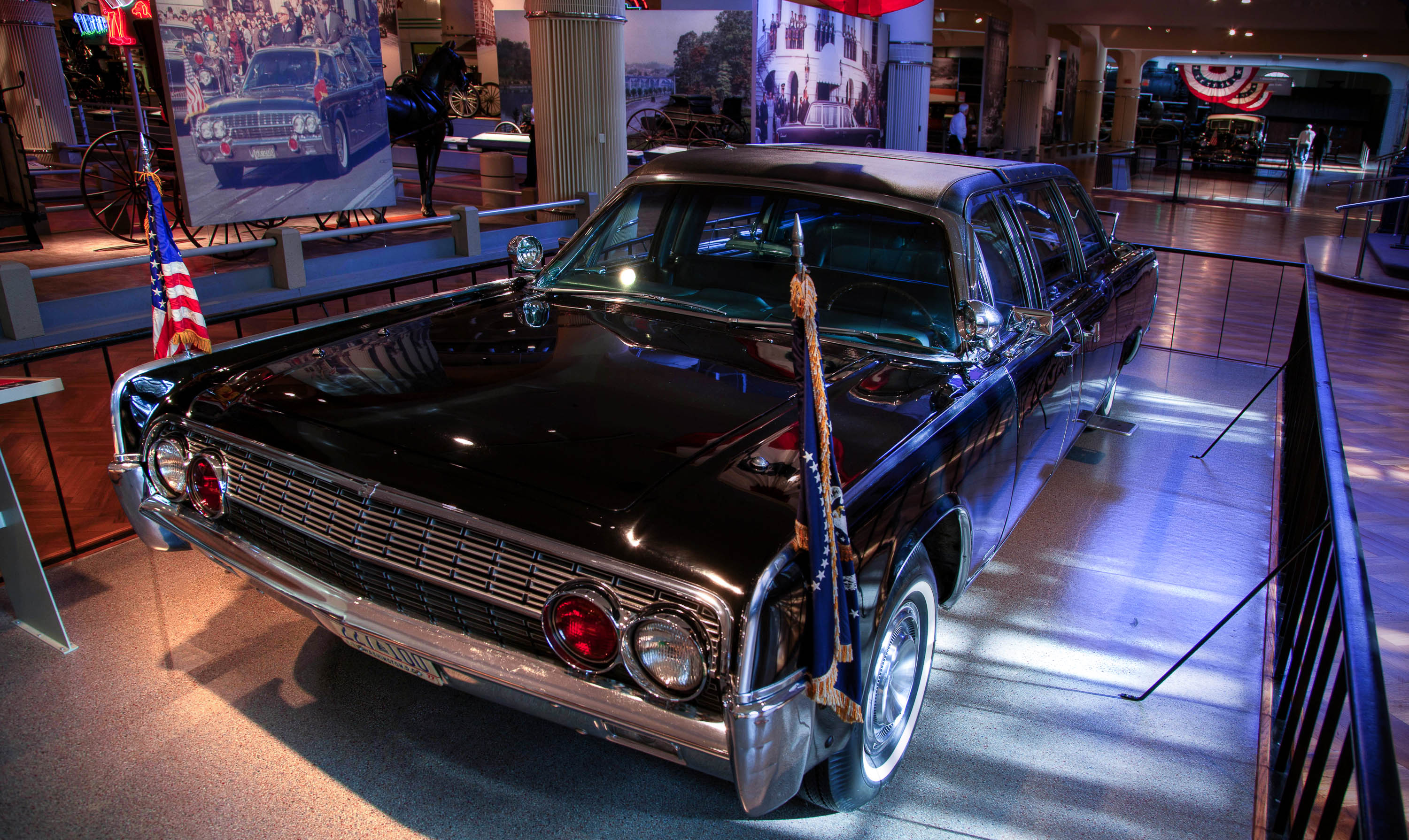
The SS-100-X used by John F. Kennedy

External videos
- Tour of the railroads exhibit, July 24, 2017, C-SPAN

Made In America

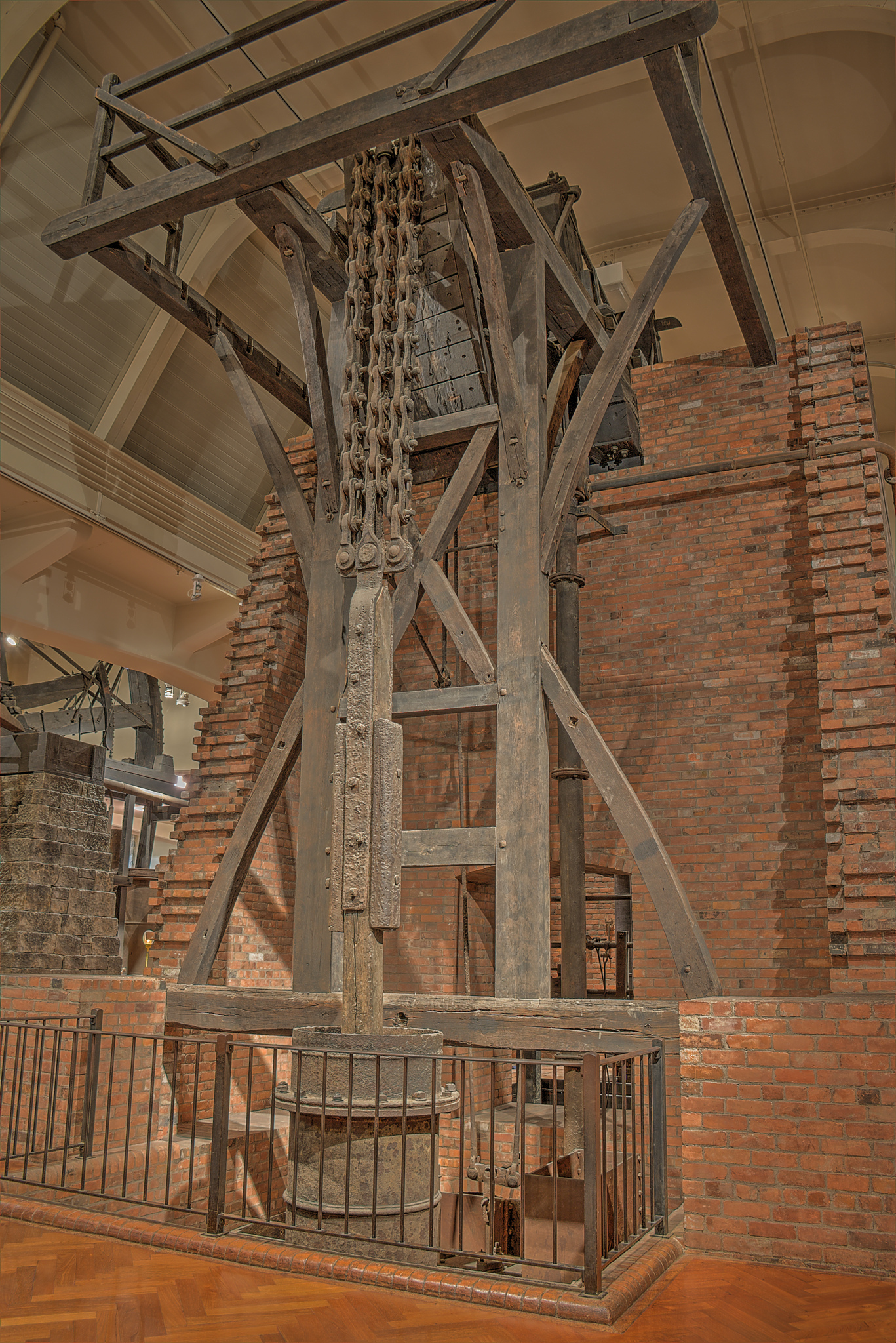
Watt Canal Pumping Engine (1796)

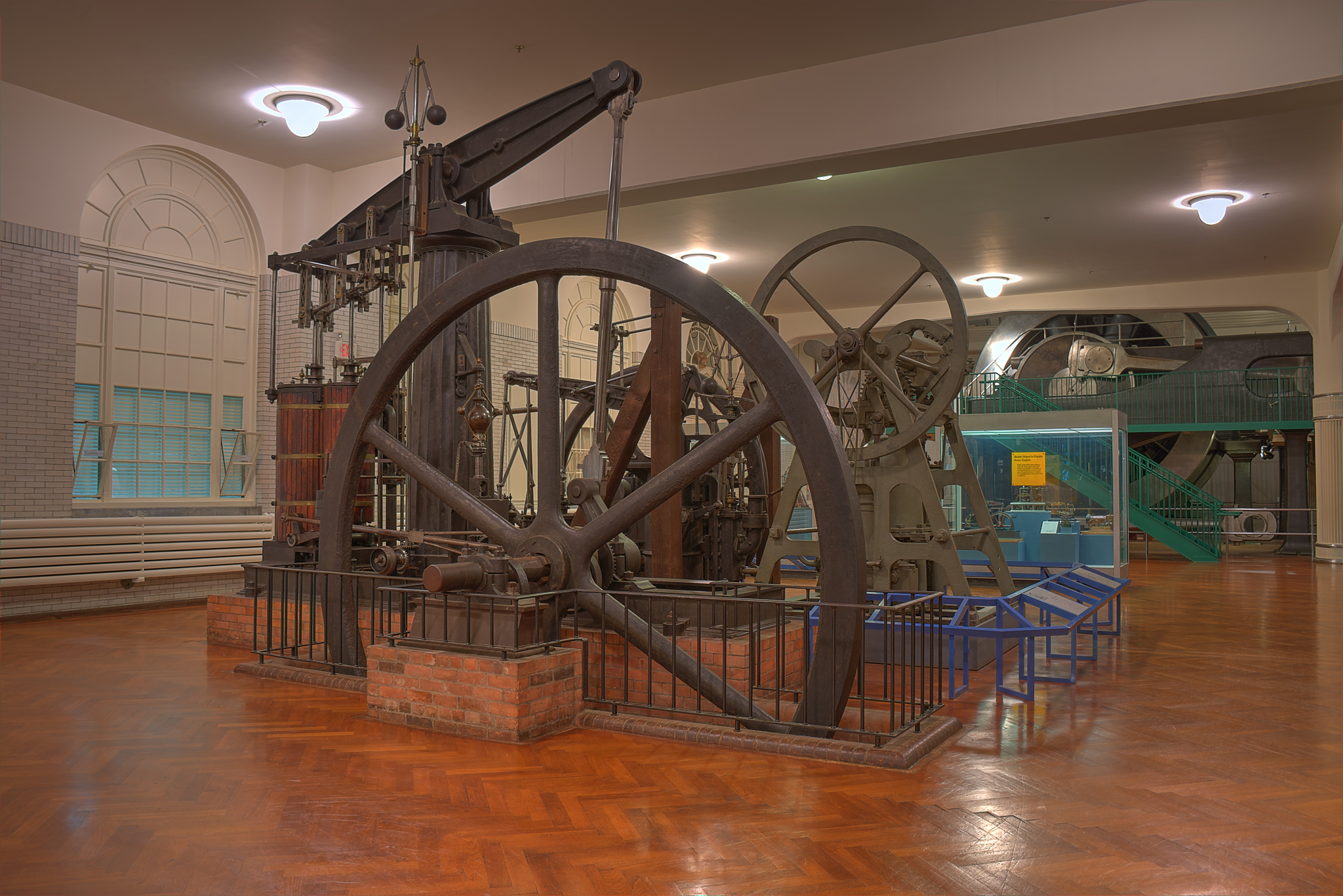
Thomas Horn Engine (1850)

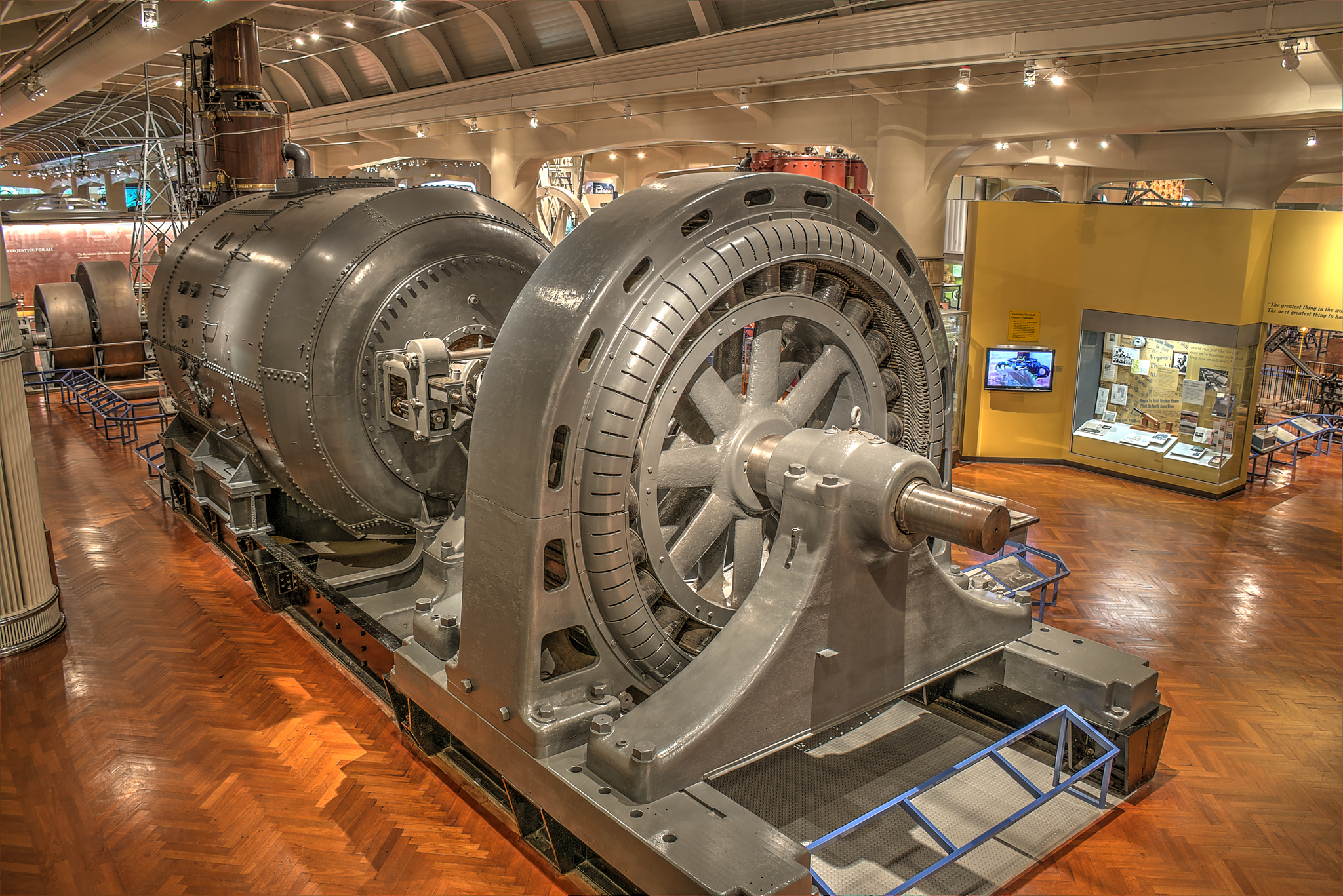
Water Engine and Electric Generator, Spokane, Washington (1903)

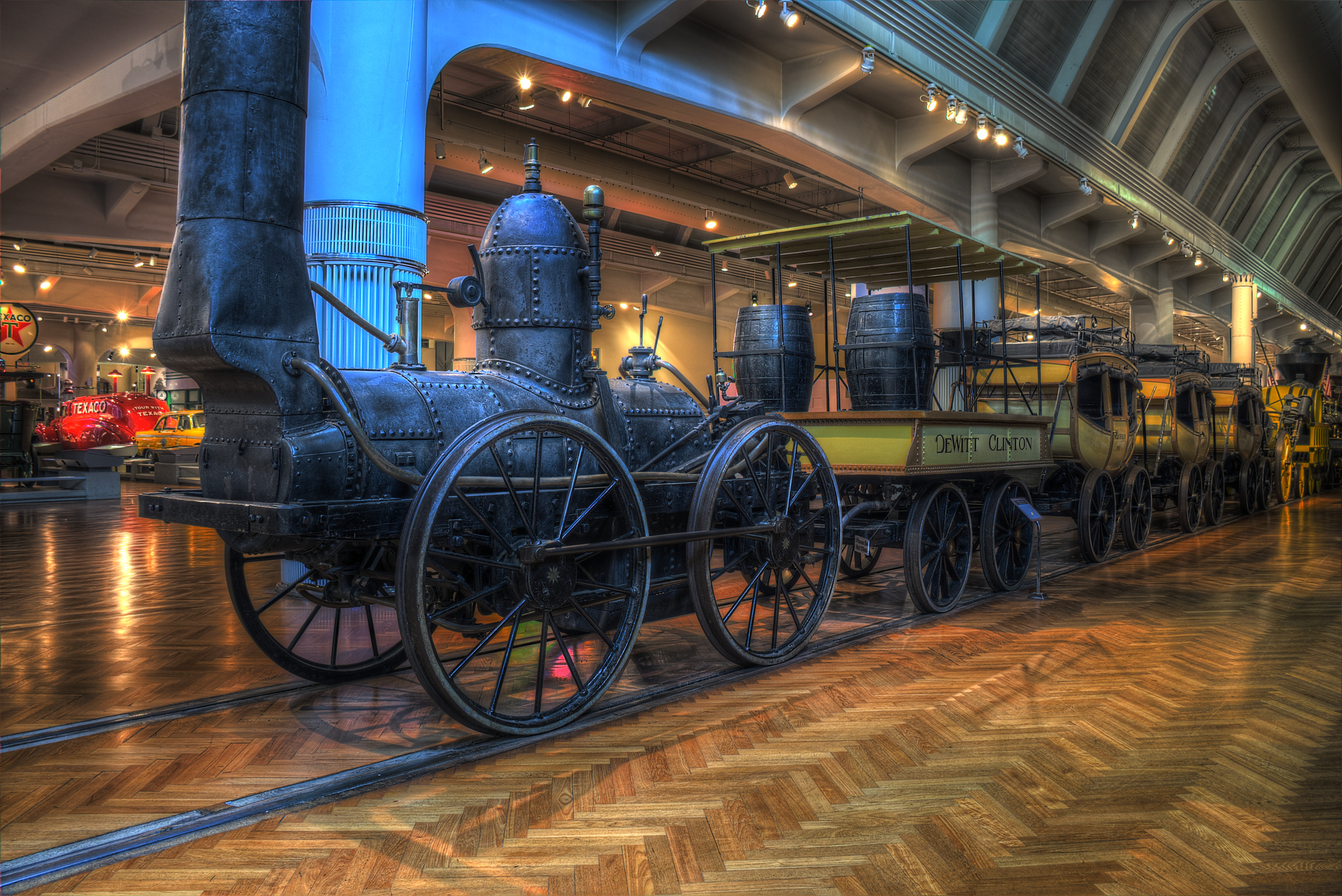
1831 DeWitt Clinton train replica

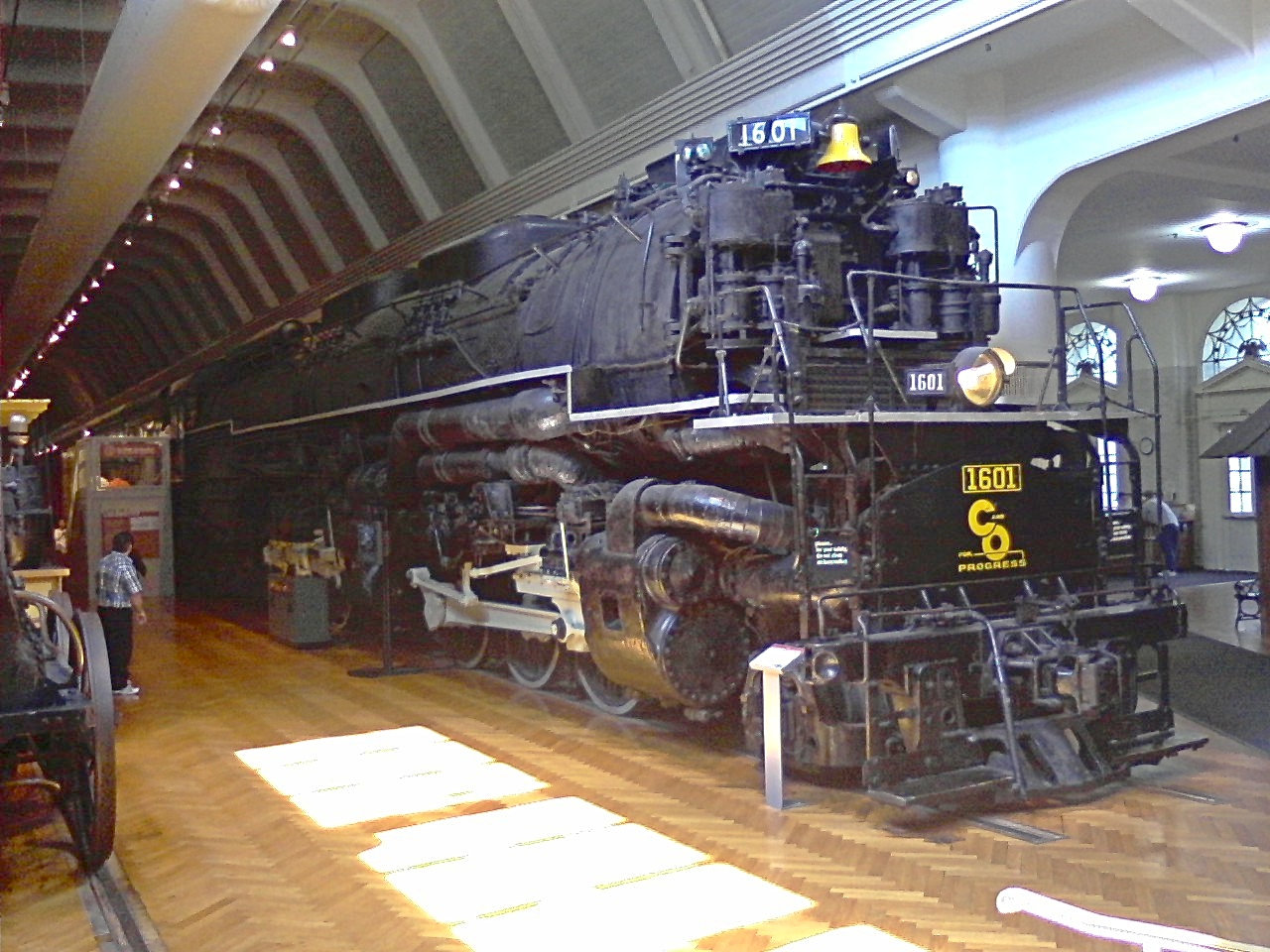
Chesapeake and Ohio Railway locomotive C&O 1601

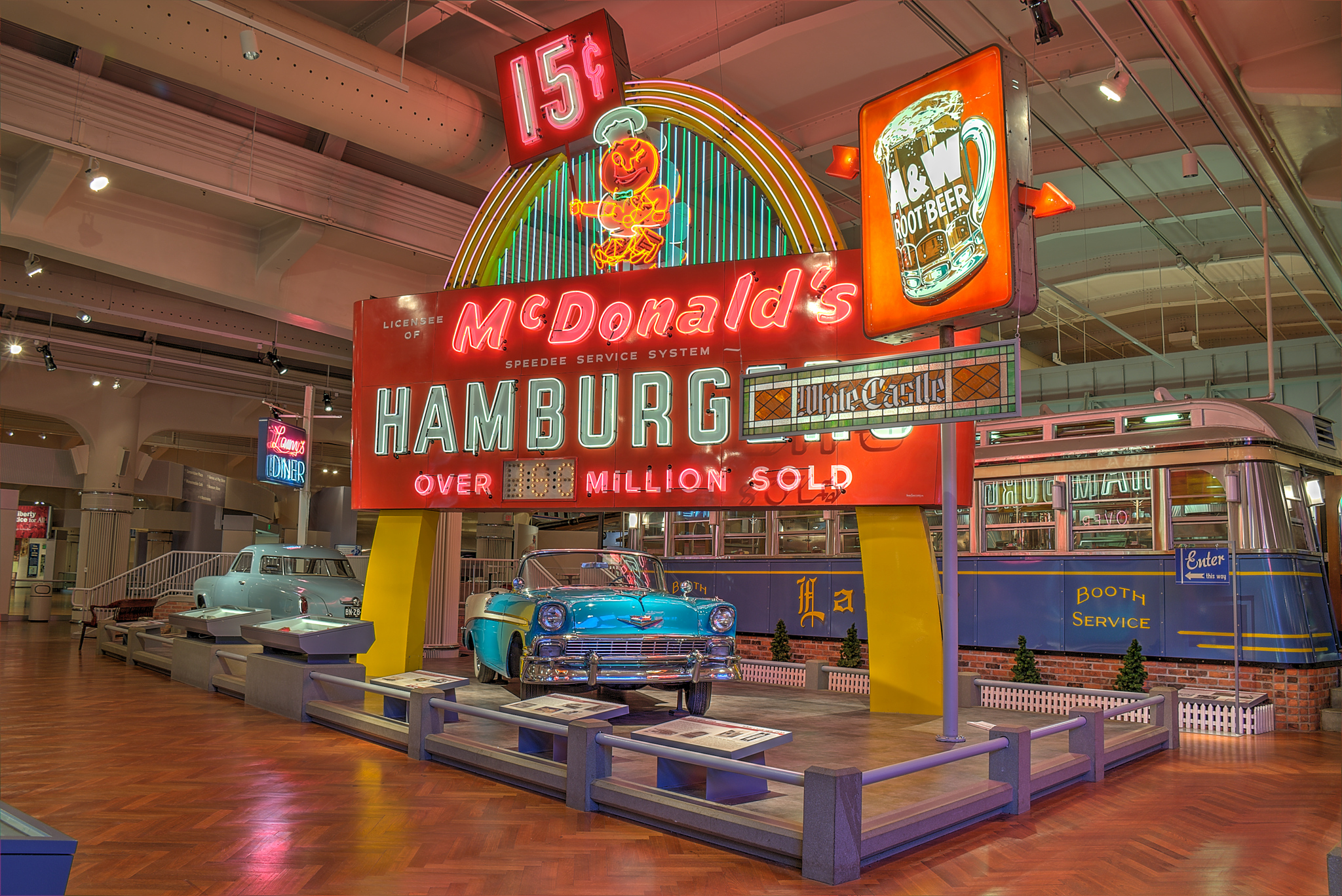
McDonald's, A&W, and White Castle signs

== Greenfield Village ==
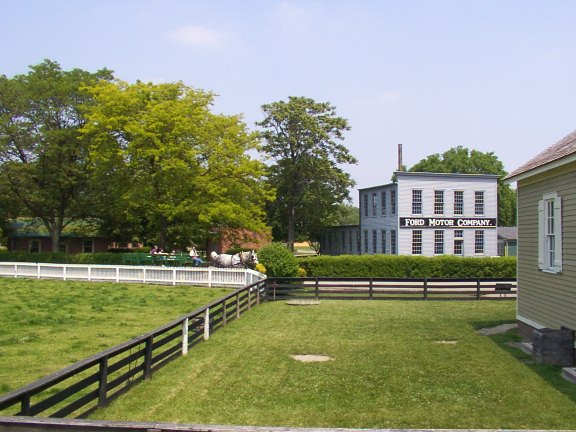
A glimpse of Greenfield Village

In 1929, Greenfield Village, the outdoor living history museum section of the Henry Ford complex, along with the adjacent Henry Ford Museum, was dedicated. It opened to the public in June 1933. It was the first outdoor museum of its type in the nation, and served as a model for subsequent outdoor museums.

Patrons enter at the gate, passing by the Josephine Ford Memorial Fountain and Benson Ford Research Center. Nearly one hundred historical buildings were moved to the property from their original locations and arranged in a "village" setting. The museum's intent is to show how Americans have lived and worked since the founding of the country.

The Village includes buildings from the 17th century to the present, many of which are staffed by costumed interpreters who conduct period tasks such as farming, sewing and cooking. A collection of craft buildings such as pottery, glass-blowing, and tin shops provide demonstrations while producing materials used in the Village and for sale.

The Village features costumed and plain-clothed presenters to tell stories and convey information about the attractions. Some of these presenters are seasonal, such as the "games on the green" presenters who only operate in the summer. Greenfield Village has 240 acres (970,000 m^{2}) of land of which only 90 acres (360,000 m^{2}) are used for the attraction, the rest being forest, river and extra pasture for the sheep and horses.

External videos
- Tour of Henry Ford's garage and childhood home, July 24, 2017, C-SPAN

Village homes, buildings, and attractions include:

- Noah Webster's Connecticut home, which served as a dormitory for Yale students from 1918 to 1936, when it was obtained by Henry Ford and moved to Greenfield Village where it was restored.
- The Wright brothers' bicycle shop and home, which were bought and moved by Henry Ford in 1937 from Dayton, Ohio.
- A replica of Thomas Edison's Menlo Park laboratory complex from New Jersey. Its reconstruction started in 1928. The buildings were laid out according to exact foundation measurements from the original site. It was furnished with original or faithful duplicates, all placed as they were originally.
- The Edison Homestead, birthplace of Thomas Edison's father. It was built in 1816 in Vienna, Ontario, and moved to Greenfield Village in the 1930s.
- Henry Ford's birthplace, which was moved from Greenfield and Ford roads in 1944. Henry Ford had it furnished exactly as it was during his mother's time.
- Henry Ford's prototype garage where he built the Ford Quadricycle.
- Harvey S. Firestone's family farmhouse from Columbiana, Ohio, which was given to the Village by Harvey's two remaining sons in 1983 to perpetuate their father's memory. The disassembling and rebuilding process took over two years, and the farm has been operated as a working sheep farm since 1985.
- The Logan County, Illinois, courthouse where Abraham Lincoln practiced law.
- William Holmes McGuffey's birthplace.
- Luther Burbank's office.
- J. R. Jones General Store was built circa 1857 in Waterford Village, Michigan. It was moved to Greenfield Village in 1927 after being purchased by Henry Ford from its then-owner August V. Jacober for $700 and the agreement to rebuild a new store on its Waterford site. It was the first structure to arrive at the Greenfield Village site. The general store was placed in its permanent location facing the village green in the spring of 1929.
- Ackley Covered Bridge, a 75-foot wooden covered bridge, built in 1832 over Enlow Fork along the Greene–Washington County line in Southwestern Pennsylvania and moved to the village in 1937.
- Cape Cod Windmill, also known as the Farris mill, is considered one of the oldest in America. It was originally built in 1633 on the north side of Cape Cod. It was moved several times around Cape Cod until it was given to Henry Ford by the Ford Dealers Association, and installed in Greenfield Village in 1936.
- In 1935, a structure was added to the park and was identified as the home of Stephen Foster. The structure was identified by historians of the time as being authentic and was then deconstructed and moved "piece by piece" from the Lawrenceville neighborhood of Pittsburgh, Pennsylvania, to Greenfield Village, Michigan. Foster's niece insisted that it was not his birthplace, and in 1953 the claim was withdrawn.
- A 1913 Herschell-Spillman carousel with an Artizan 'C' band organ with a replica Wurlitzer #153 facade converted to play Wurlitzer rolls.

There are various modes of historic transportation in the Village providing rides for visitors, which utilize authentic Ford Model Ts, a 1931 Ford Model AA bus (one of about 15 known to exist), horse-drawn omnibuses, and trains pulled by steam locomotives on the Weiser Railroad.

Greenfield Village attractions

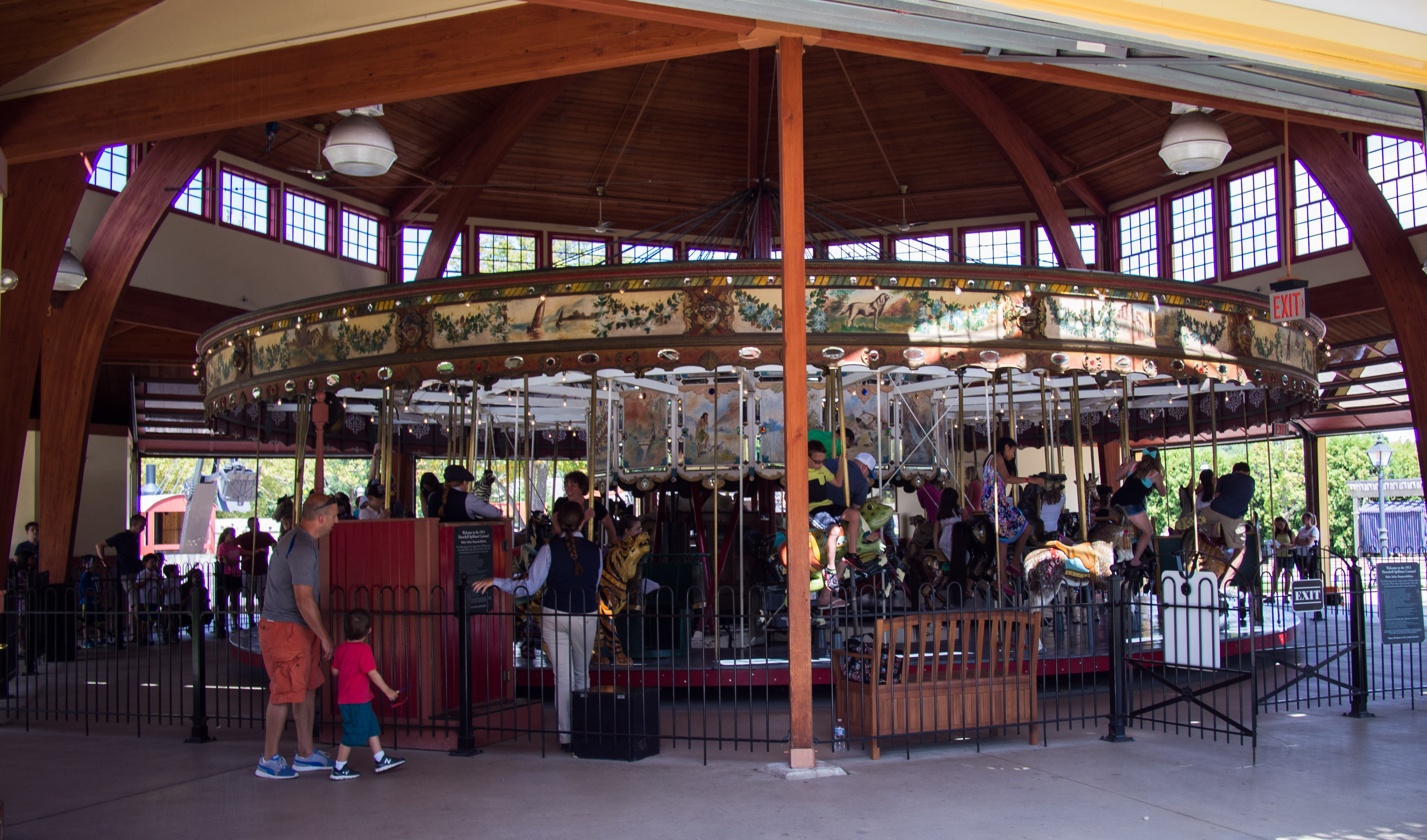
Herschell-Spillman Carousel

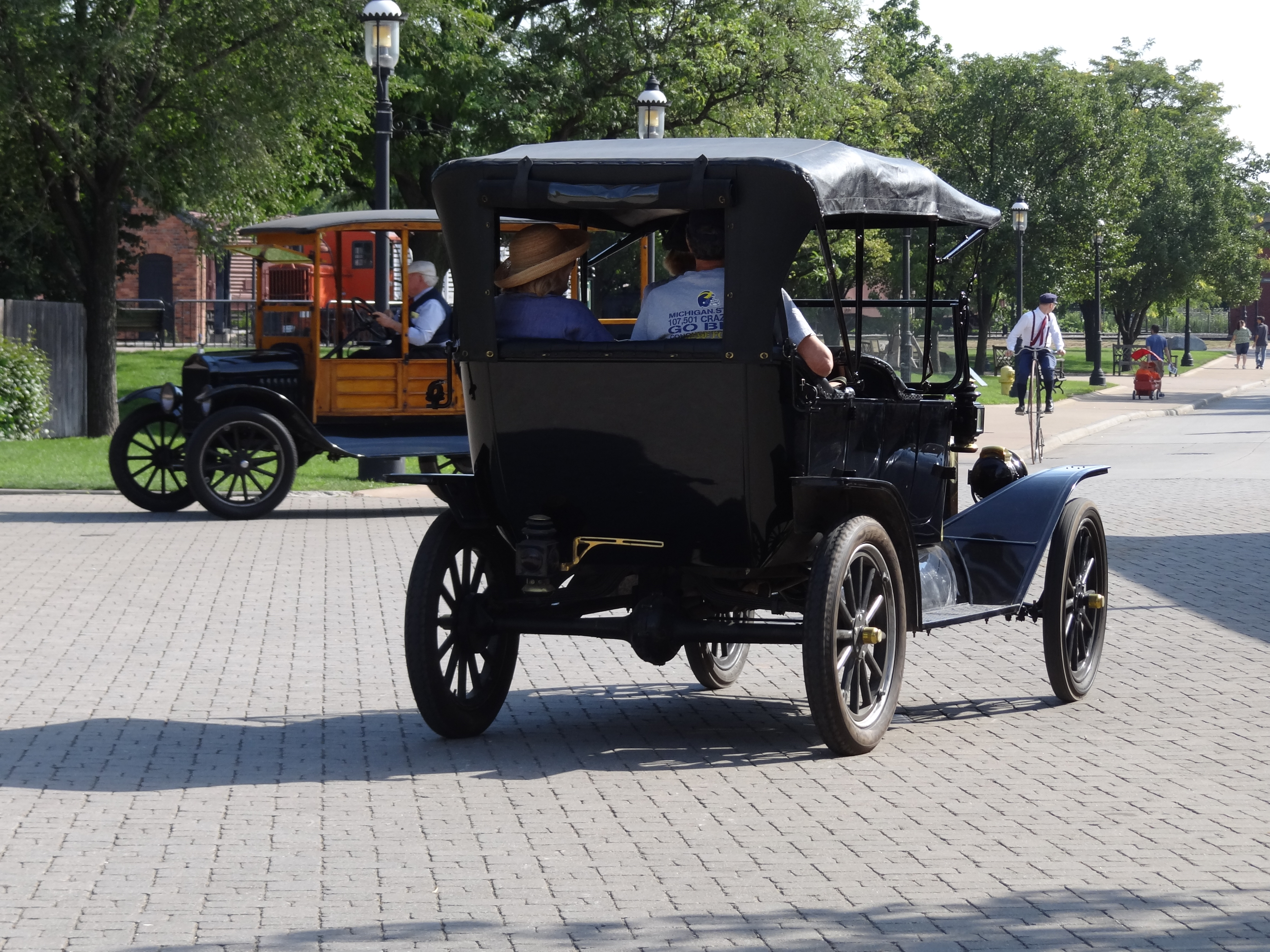
Ford Model T rides

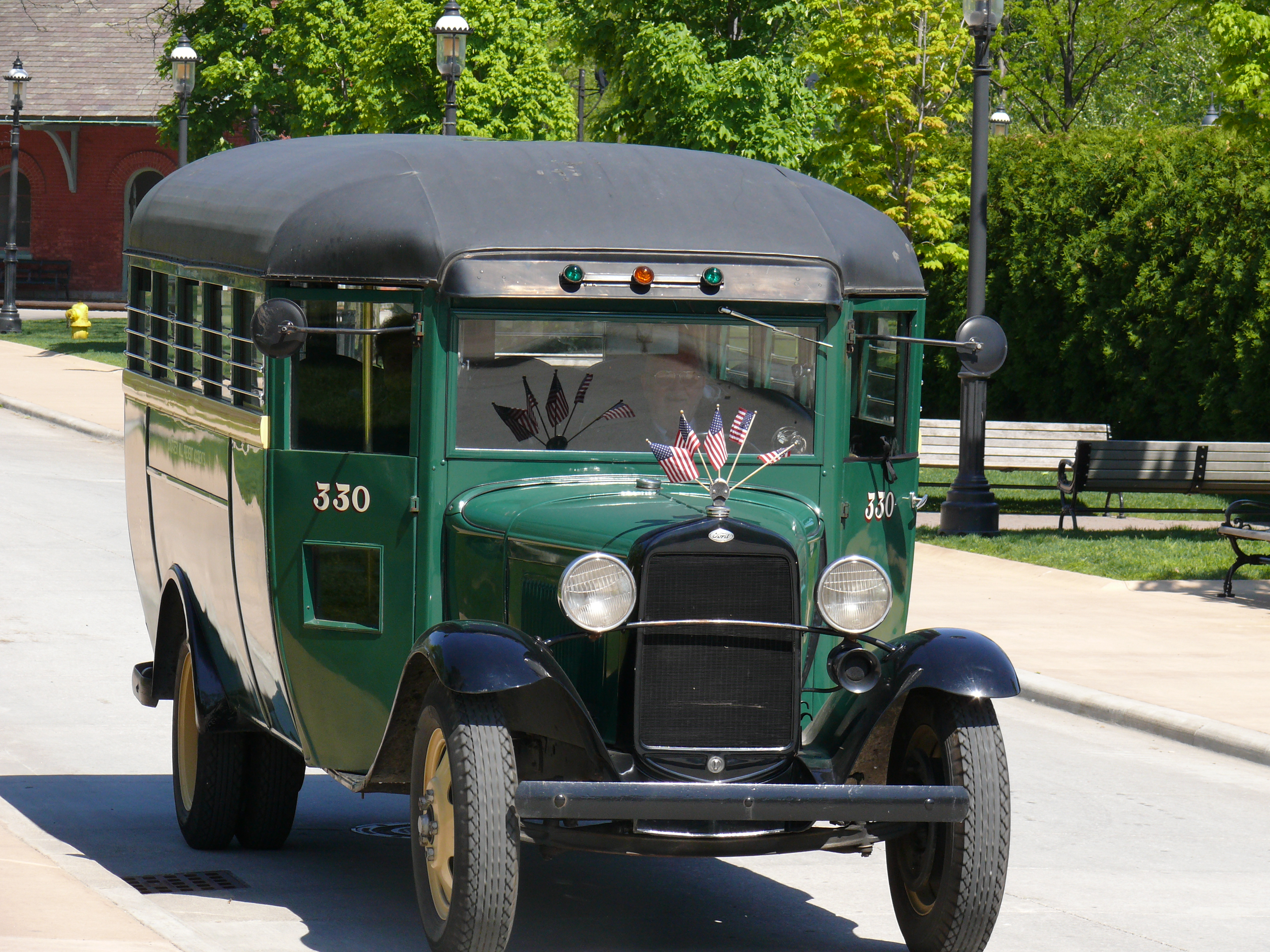
Ford Model AA bus rides

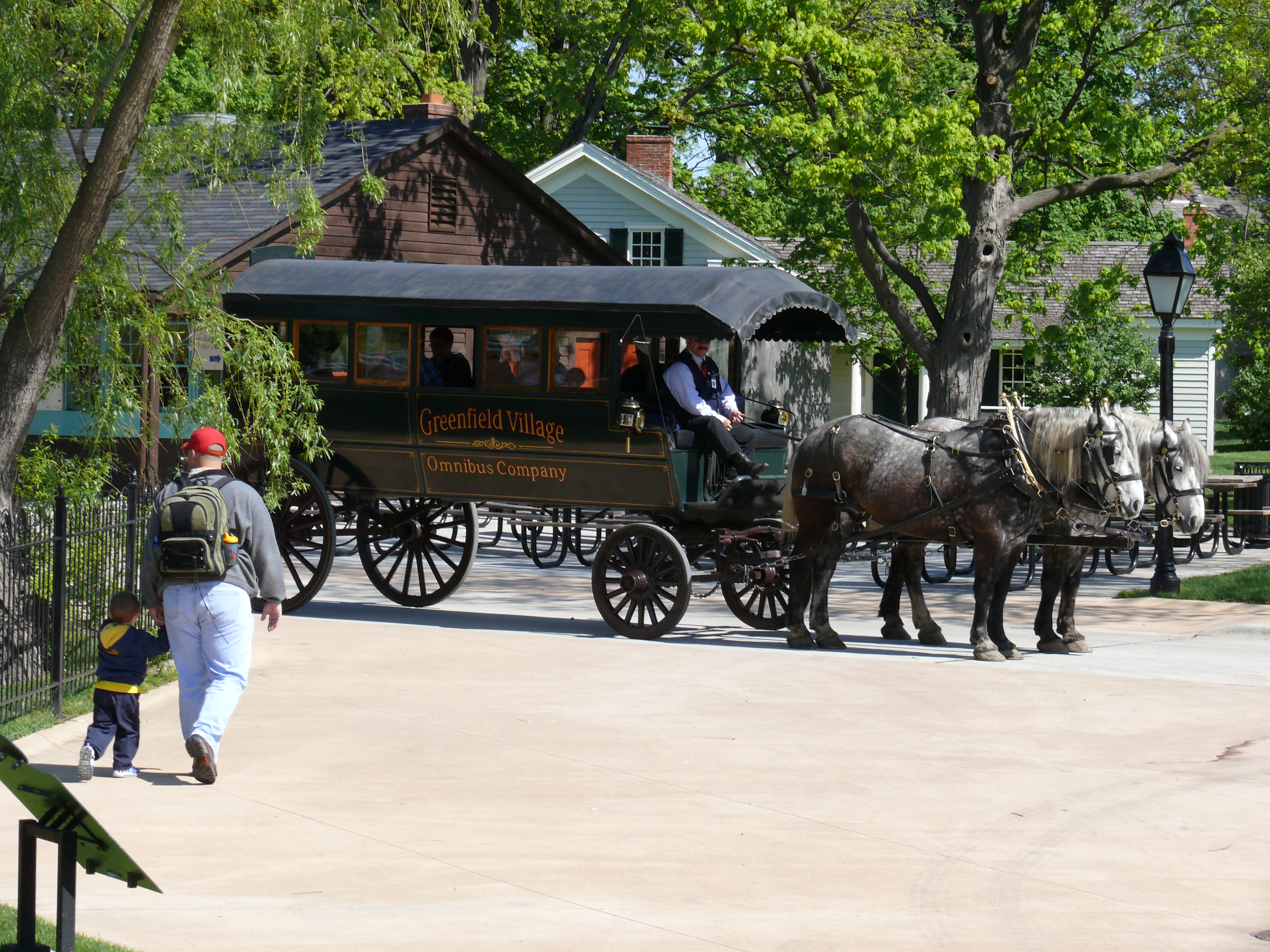
Horse-drawn omnibus rides

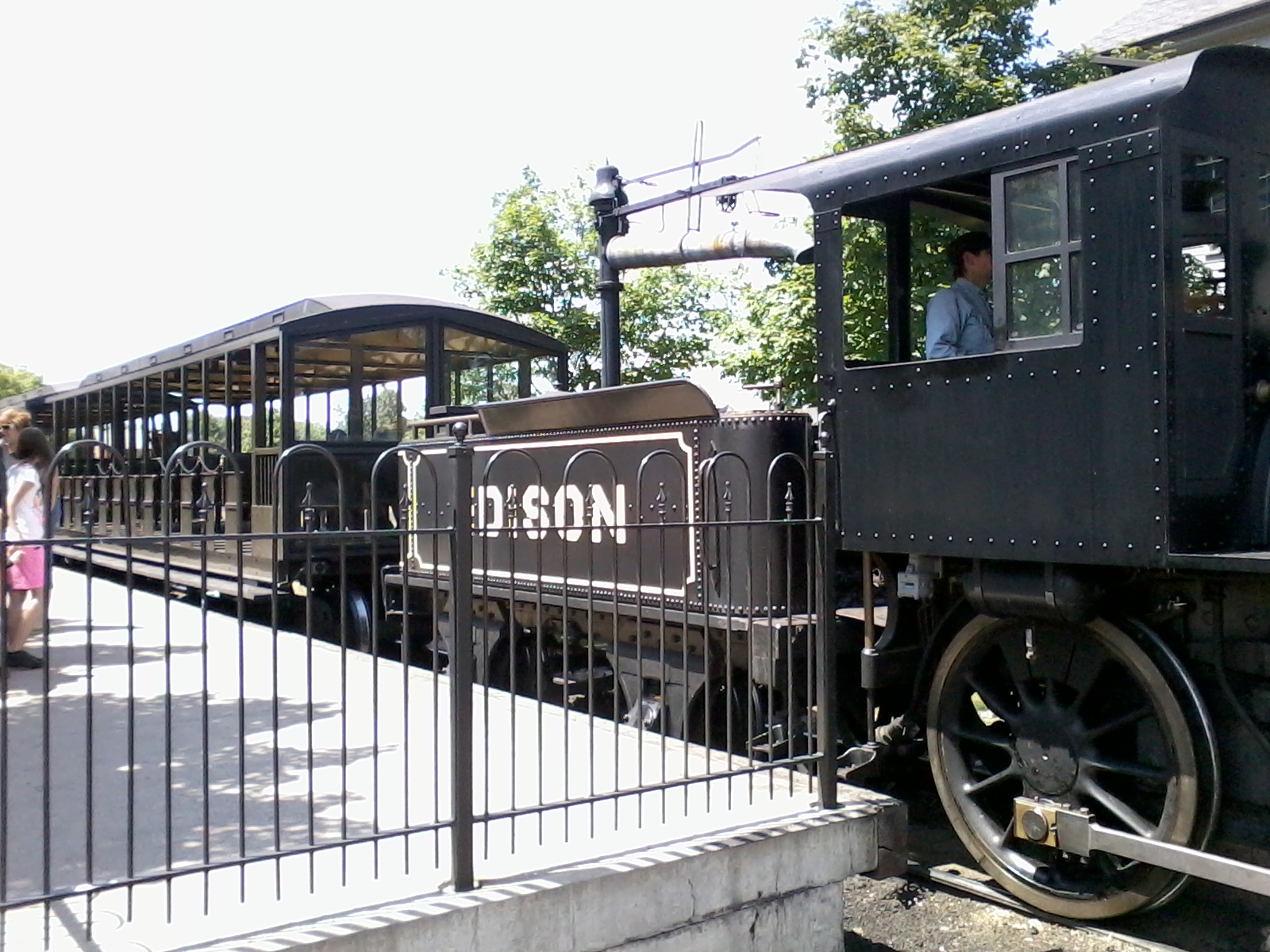
Weiser Railroad

=== Weiser Railroad ===
Weiser Railroad
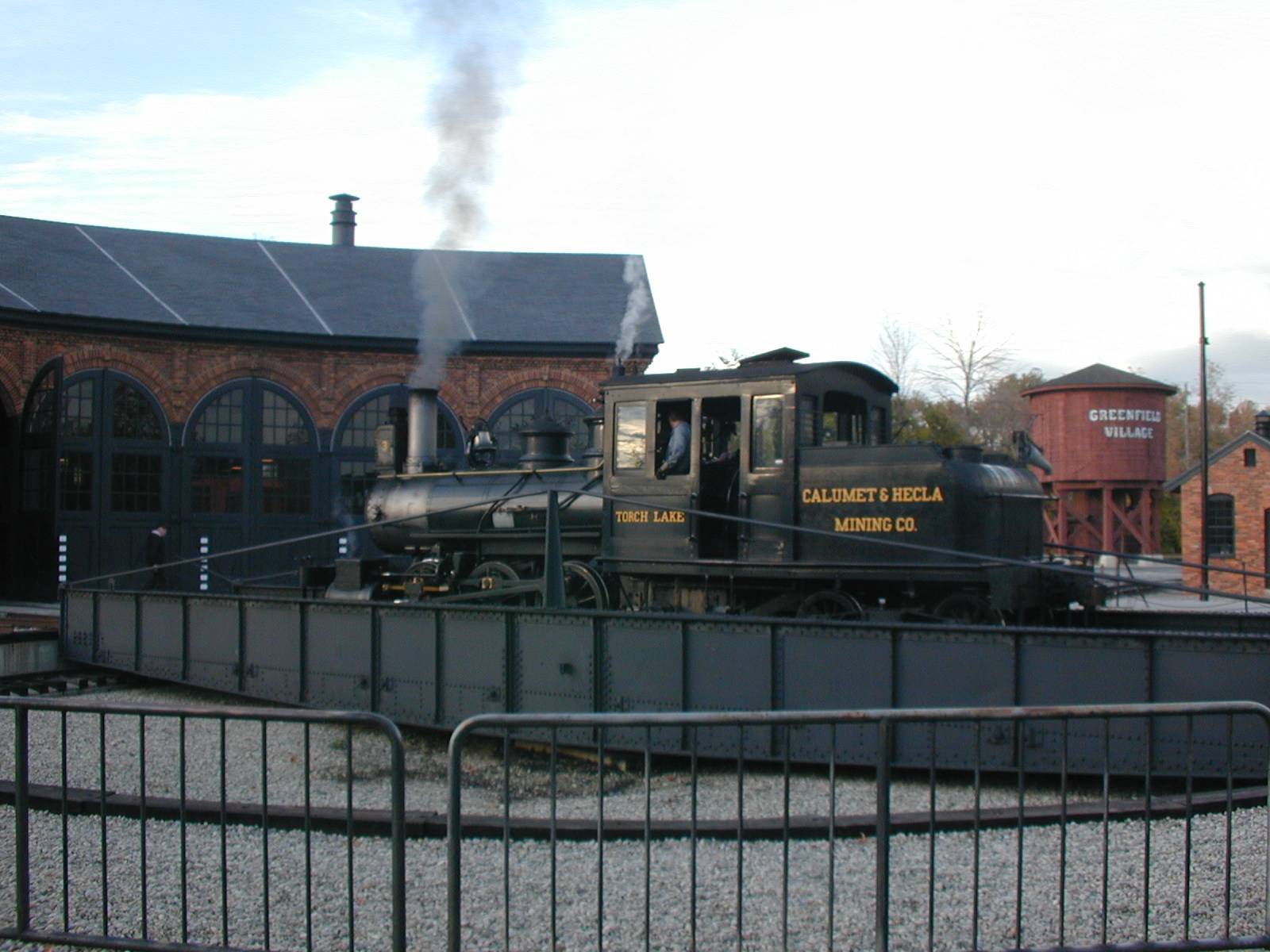
- The Weiser Railroad's Torch Lake locomotive on the turntable in front of the roundhouse

Overview
- Headquarters: Dearborn
- Locale: Dearborn, Michigan
- Dates of operation: 1929–present

Technical
- Track gauge: 1,435 mm (4 ft 8 1/2 in)
- Length: 2 miles (3.2 km)

The rail line on which the steam locomotives in Greenfield Village presently run originally consisted of a simple straight stretch of track along the northern edge of the museum property, and has been present ever since Greenfield Village was dedicated in 1929. The rail line, now named the Weiser Railroad, was later expanded into a continuous loop around the perimeter of the museum property, which was completed in stages between 1971 and 1972.

This 4 ft 8 1/2 in (1,435 mm) standard gauge passenger line is 2 miles (3.2 km) long and has four stations. All of the railroad's stations consist solely of single side platforms except for the station in the Railroad Junction section, which also includes the relocated Smiths Creek Depot building originally built for the Grand Trunk Railway in 1858.

The line utilizes a modern replica of a Detroit, Toledo & Milwaukee Railroad (DT&M) roundhouse built in 1884 in Marshall, Michigan. At the time it was opened to the public in 2000, the new DT&M Roundhouse replica was one of only seven working roundhouses open to the public in the United States. A hand-operated Pere Marquette Railway turntable, originally built in 1901 in Petoskey, Michigan, is also in use.

The railroad, unusual for a heritage railroad built purposely for tourism, has a direct connection to the United States National Railroad Network. The line to which it connects is a section of the Michigan Line owned by MDOT and is used by Amtrak's Wolverine service, which runs between Chicago, Illinois, and Pontiac, Michigan. In the past, Amtrak's Greenfield Village station provided direct access to Greenfield Village near the Weiser Railroad's Smiths Creek Depot for reserved tour groups of twenty or more. It was consolidated in December 2014 with the new John D. Dingell Transit Center. The new transit center is adjacent to the Henry Ford museum complex and has a gate allowing access to the complex via a short walk.

Weiser Railroad locomotive details
Number	Image	Name	Wheel arrangement	Built	Builder	Original owner	Status	Notes
3		Torch Lake	0-6-4RT	1873	Mason Machine Works	Hecla & Torch Lake Railroad	Operational	Only surviving Mason Bogie locomotive in the world. Oldest operational locomotive in the U.S. as of 2021.
1		Edison	4-4-0	1875	Manchester Locomotive Works	Edison Portland Cement Company	Operational	Originally an 0-4-0, which was rebuilt into a 4-4-0 by Ford in 1932.
7			4-4-0	1897	Baldwin Locomotive Works	Detroit & Lima Northern Railway	Operational	Henry Ford's personal locomotive. Donated by Henry Ford in 1930. Restored from 2007 to 2013.
45			4-4-2	1902	American Locomotive Company	Michigan Central Railroad	Display	Cosmetically restored. On static display in the roundhouse.
1			B	1927	Plymouth Locomotive Works	Mistersky Power Plant	Operational	Gasoline powered
1			B-B	1942	General Electric	United States Navy	Operational	50-ton switcher

== Greenfield Village gallery ==
General exhibits

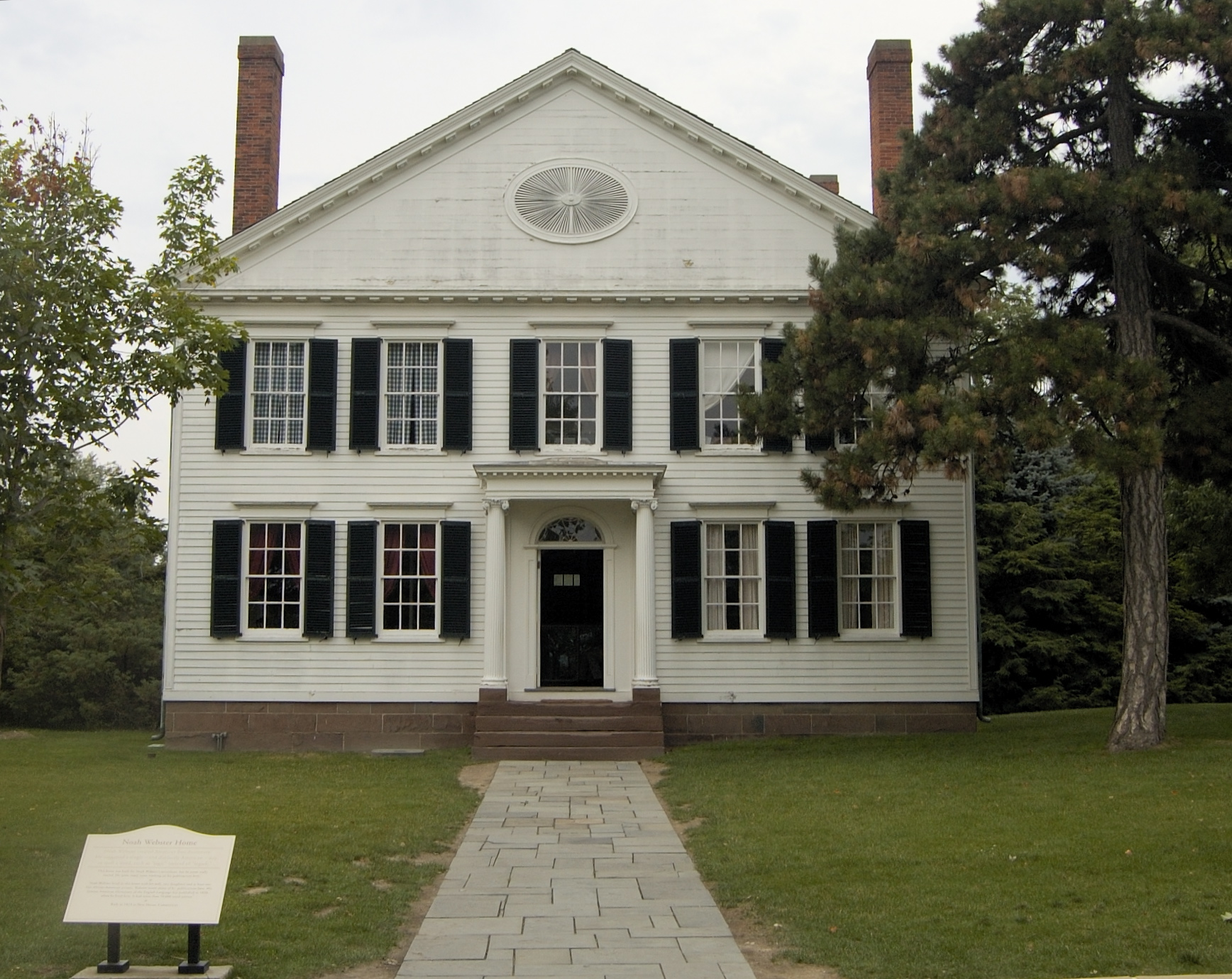
Noah Webster's home from New Haven, Connecticut

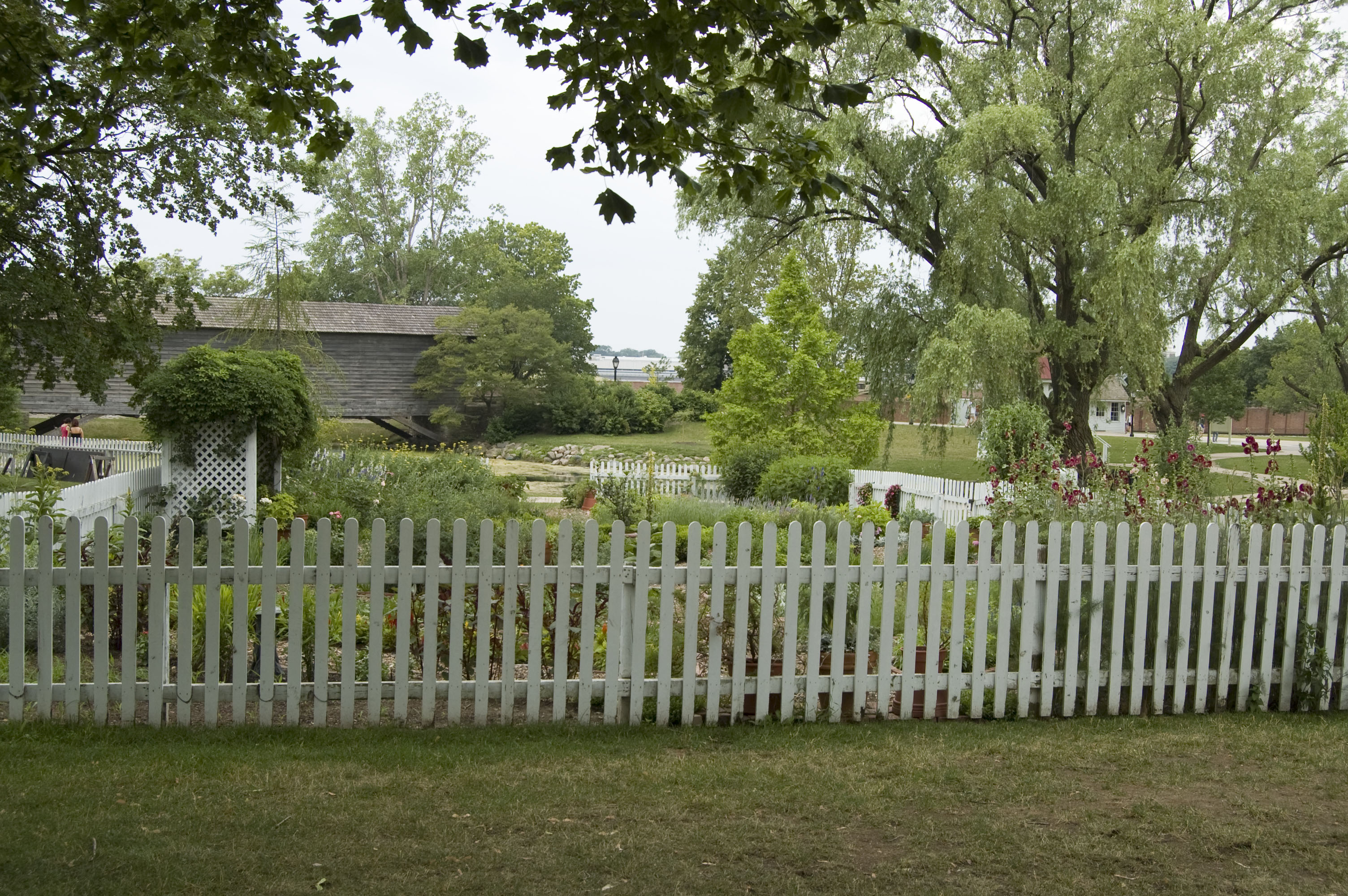
A garden and the Ackley Covered Bridge

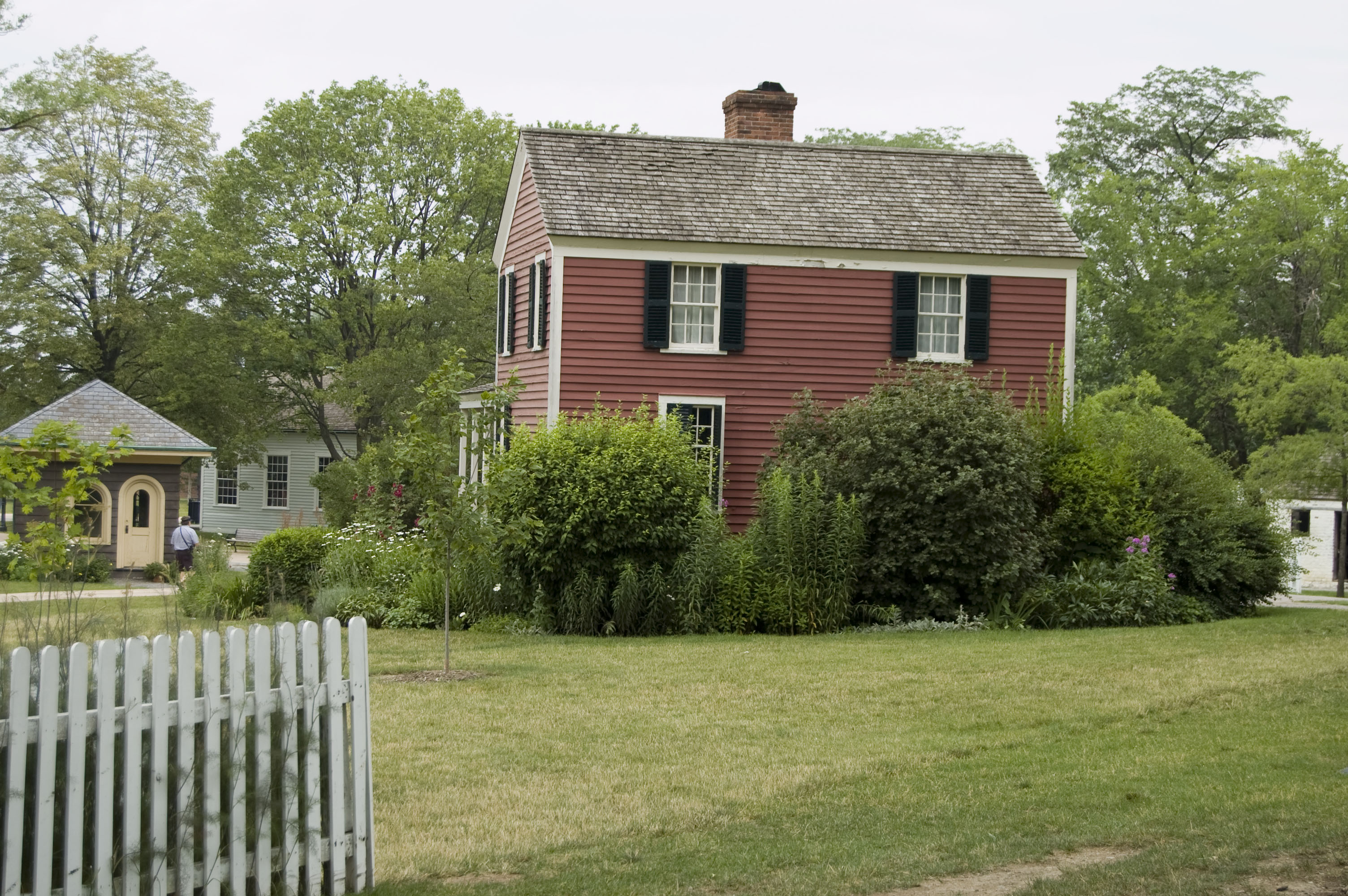
The Burbank cottage (left) and Garden House Shop

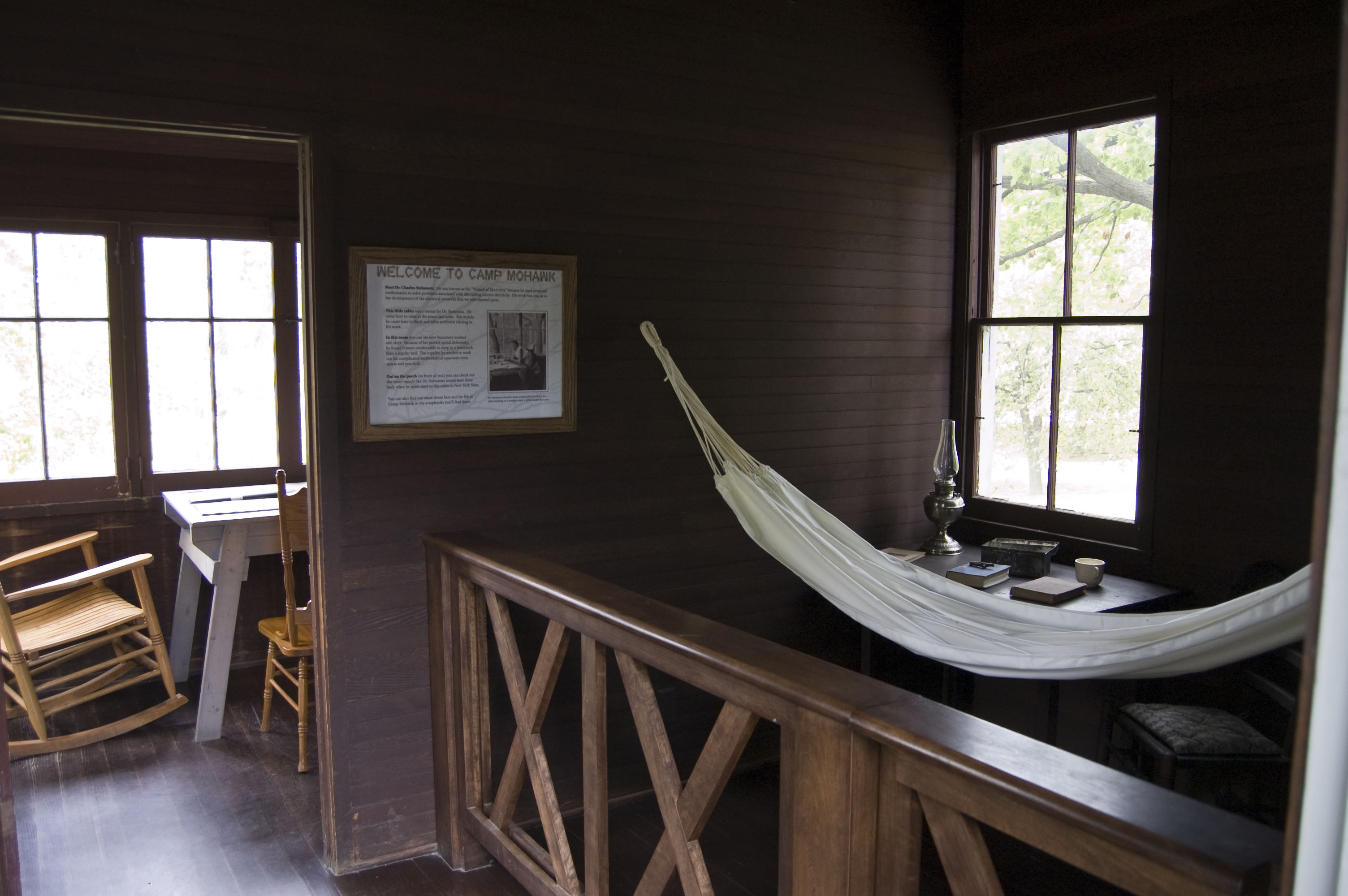
Charles Proteus Steinmetz owned this small cabin that overlooked the Mohawk River near Schenectady, New York

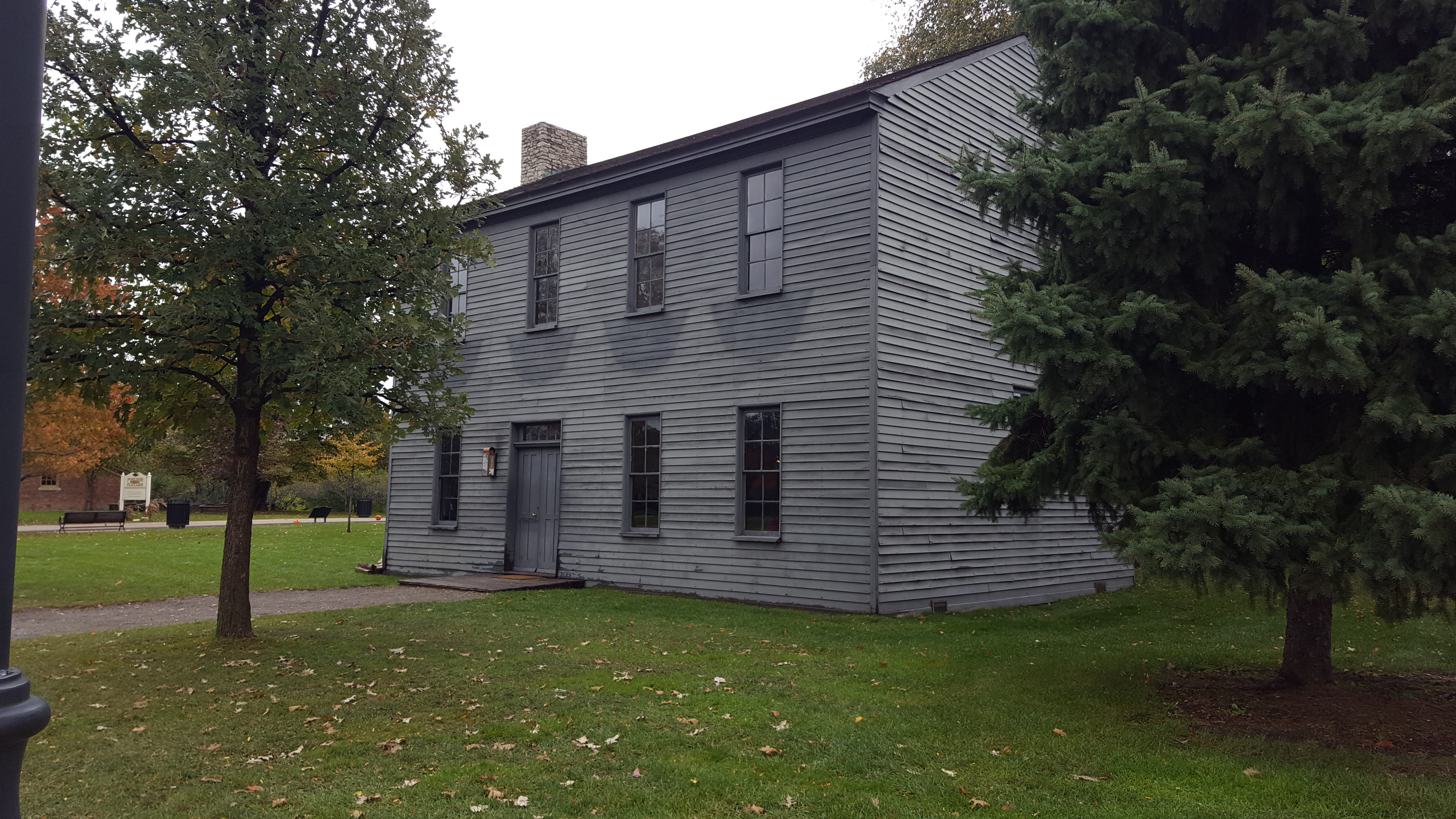
The original Postville Courthouse
Thomas Edison exhibits

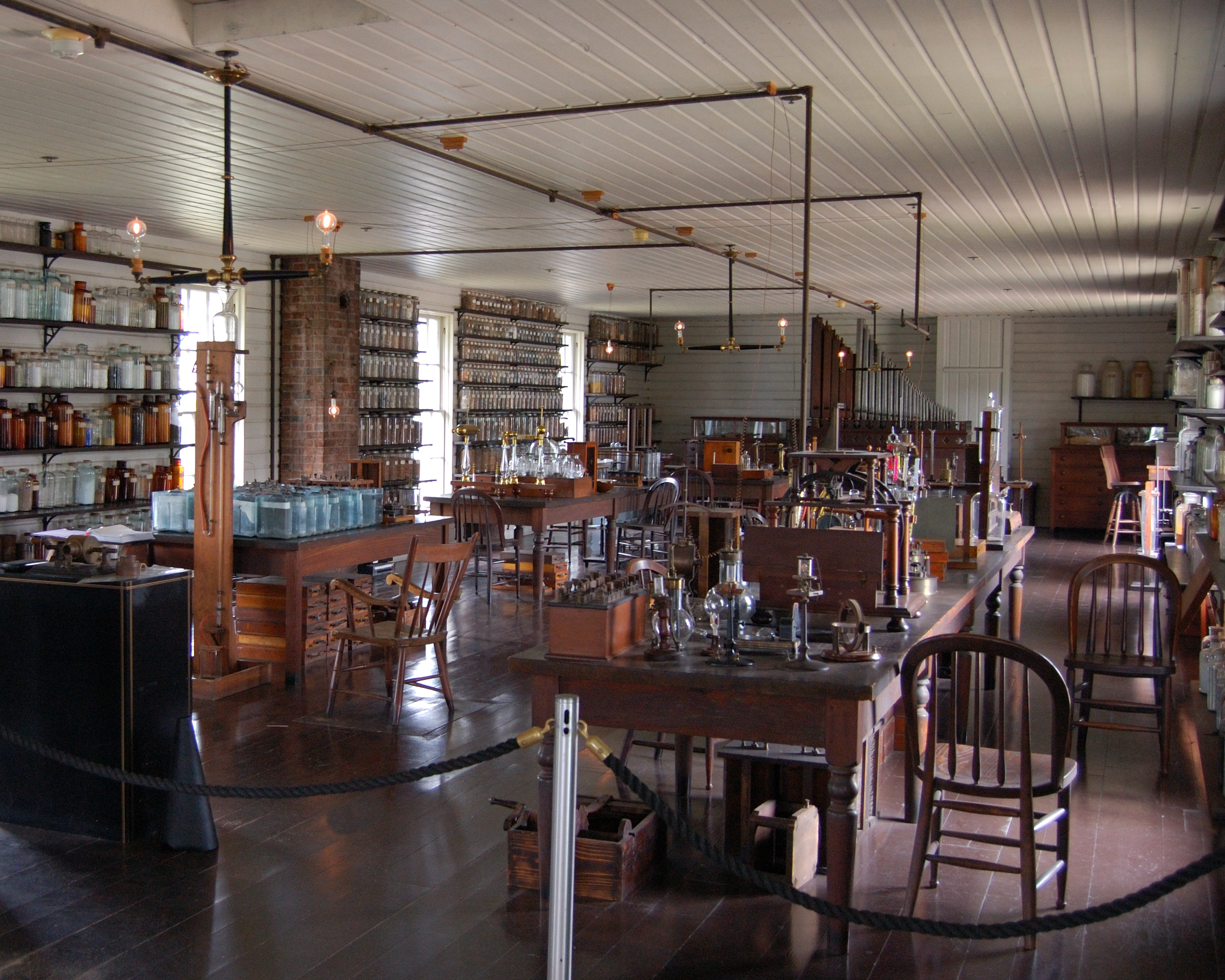
Upper level of Thomas Edison's Menlo Park Laboratory

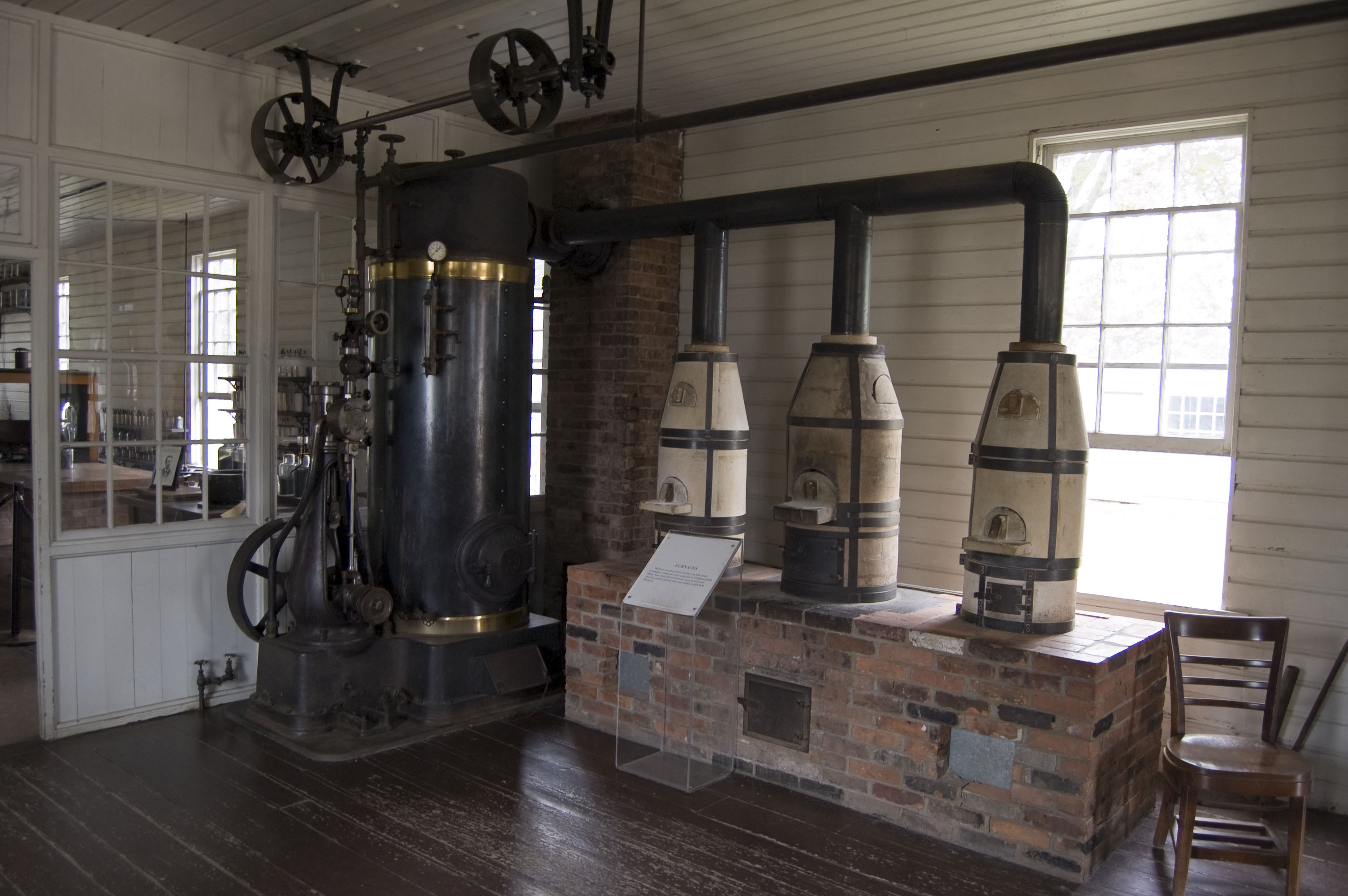
Three crucibles in Thomas Edison's Menlo Park Laboratory. At the left is a boiler and a small steam engine.
Wright Brothers exhibits

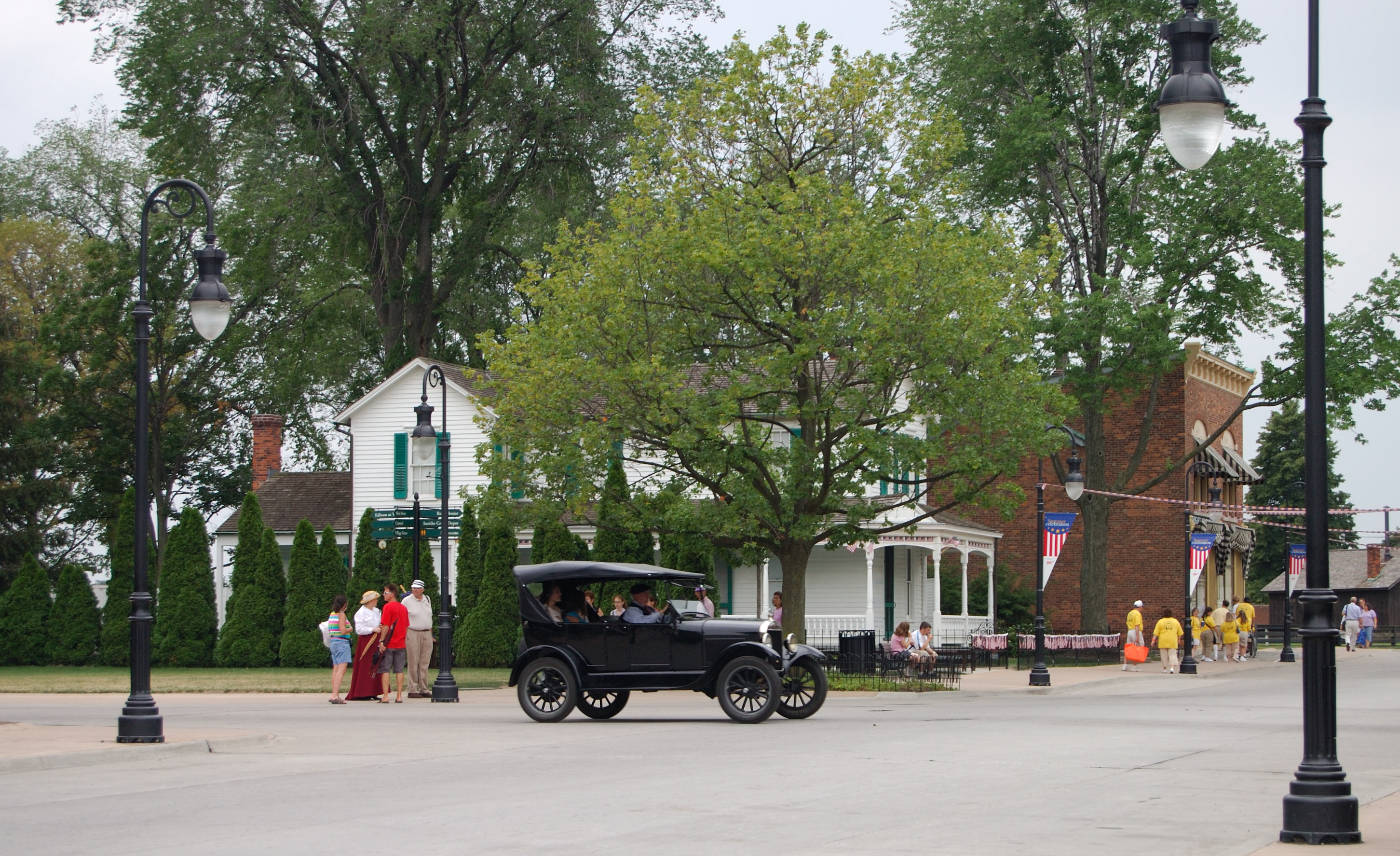
Wilbur and Orville Wright's house and bicycle shop

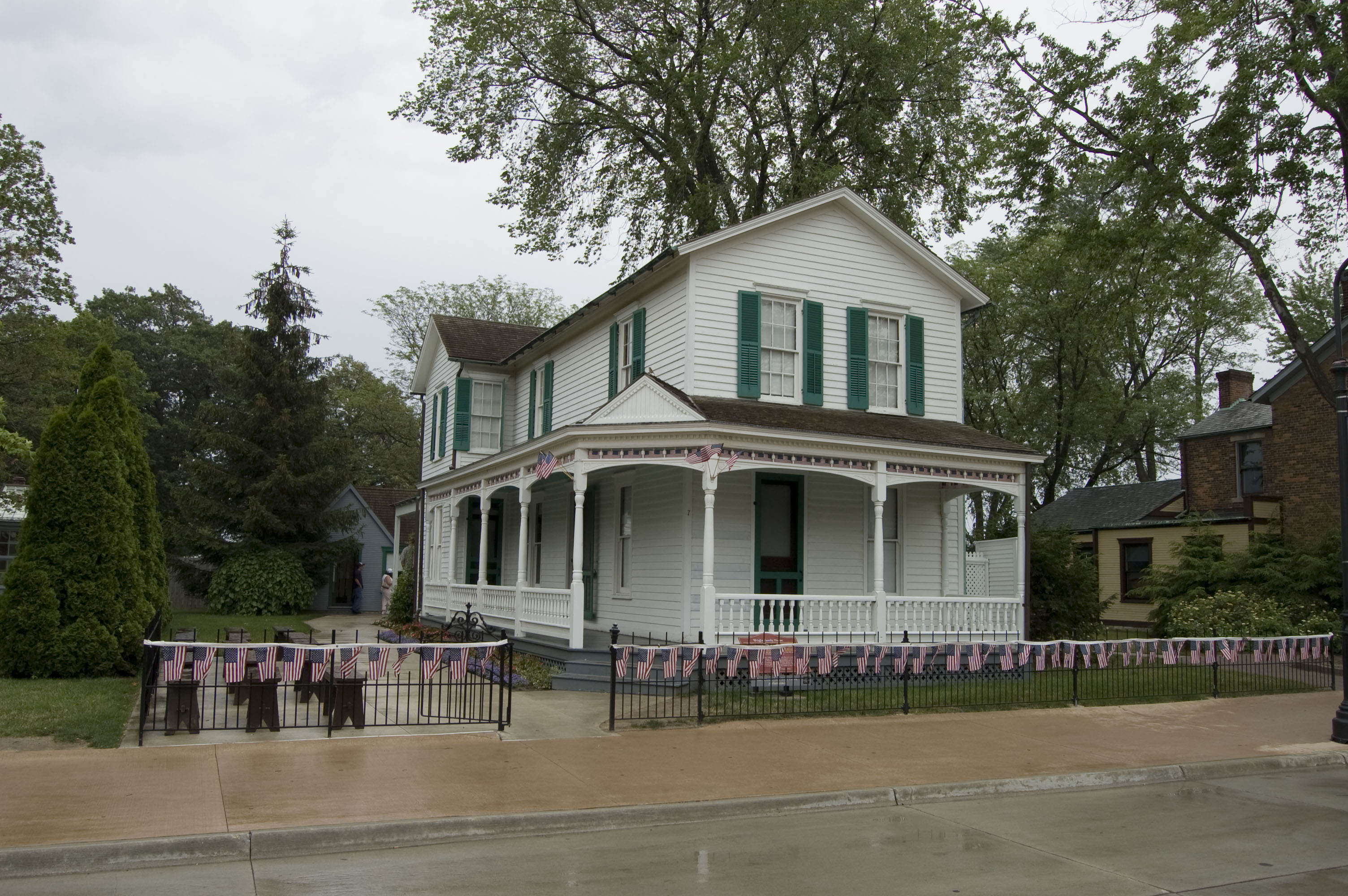
The Wright Brothers' house relocated from Dayton, Ohio

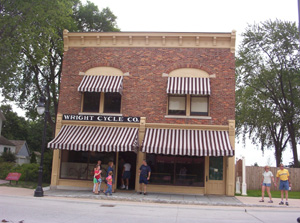
The Wright Cycle Company building

== Signature events ==
A hay baling demonstration during Maker Faire Detroit 2011 at the Henry Ford

=== Civil War Remembrance ===
Each year the Village honors the sacrifices and achievements of those who fought in the American Civil War. The Civil War Remembrance event takes place Memorial Day weekend (Saturday–Monday) every year. An estimated 750,000 people died during the Civil War. The Civil War Remembrance is a weekend event, which includes hundreds of Union and Confederate reenactors, musicians and historic presenters.

This event features more than 400 Civil War reenactors who spend the entire weekend in the Village. Greenfield Village provides many opportunities in order to learn about the Civil War: exhibits, presentations, battle reenactments, concerts, short plays, hands-on activities and Q&A with historians.

=== Motor Muster ===
Motor Muster is one of two car shows that take place annually in Greenfield Village. Motor Muster is traditionally held on Father's Day weekend. This event currently features cars built from 1932 to 1976, and features between 600 and 800 cars. Special attractions include car judging, and Pass in Review in which experts discuss highlights of the passing cars.

=== Summer Camp ===
Every summer the Henry Ford has a Summer Camp. It takes place inside Greenfield Village and the Henry Ford Museum between June and August. It is for children in grades 2–9. Each grade level has a different theme and children who participate in the Summer Camp have the opportunity to look at both the Henry Ford Museum of American Innovation and Greenfield Village from different perspectives. Children participate in activities such as: apprenticeships, canoeing, glass blowing and other age-dependent activities.

=== World Tournament of Historic Base Ball ===
The World Tournament of Historical Base Ball takes place every year in August. Guests get to take a step back in time to 1867 as vintage base ball clubs from around the country compete by the game's early rules in a two-day exposition of historic base ball. The clubs engage in two days of throwing, batting and competition. The event is included in Greenfield Village admission.

=== Salute to America ===
For four nights around Independence Day, the Detroit Symphony Orchestra performs a patriotic concert on Walnut Grove in the Village. Attendance ranges from 5000 to 9500 per evening.

=== Ragtime Street Fair ===
This weekend event in July was first presented in 2007 and ran annually through 2015. Ragtime Street Fair featured dozens of live performers, including the River Raisin Ragtime Revue, "Perfessor" Bill Edwards, Mike Montgomery, Nan Bostick, Taslimah Bey, John Remmers, and Tartarsauce Traditional Jazz Band, who celebrated the Ragtime era (ca. 1900–1917). The event also featured silent movies, phonograph demonstrations, a cake walk, a cutting contest, and a musical revue in Town Hall as well as the 1912 presidential campaign of Theodore Roosevelt. Instruction in the ragtime one-step was provided free of charge at this event.

=== Old Car Festival ===
The Old Car Festival takes place every year in September. The Old Car Festival has been held on the first weekend after Labor Day since 1955. The festival takes over the streets and grounds of Greenfield Village with the sights, sounds, and smells of hundreds of authentic vehicles from the 1890s through 1932.

This event features 500–700 cars. Special events include car judging, Pass in Review, the gaslight tour, and car races on the Walnut Grove field. Guests can take a self-guided tour of the exposition and talk to the owners of the treasured vehicles. Visitors can watch a Model T be assembled in just minutes, attend presentations, and hear experts share information about the vintage vehicles.

=== Hallowe'en in Greenfield Village ===
The Village's Halloween celebration features decorations, a headless horseman, witches, other costumed characters, treats and activities for visitors. It is held Thursday, Friday, Saturday and Sunday evenings in October.

=== Holiday Nights ===
The Christmas season has traditionally been popular in Greenfield Village. Many buildings feature period decorations and the Village is open for self-guided strolls. An ice skating rink is available. Visitors can view live entertainment and costumed presenters or ride in a horse-drawn carriage or Model T.

== Rouge Tour ==
The Ford Rouge Factory Tour is a first-hand journey behind the scenes of a modern, working automobile factory. Boarding buses at the Henry Ford Museum, visitors are taken to the River Rouge Plant and Dearborn Truck Plant, an industrial complex where Ford has built cars since the Model A that once employed 100,000 people.

In 2003, the Ford Rouge Factory, the manufacturing facility for the Ford F-Series truck, reopened following extensive renovations. When it reopened in 2003, as sustainable architecture (Gold LEED Building) led by noted 'green' architect William McDonough, it also opened a new state-of-the-art visitor center highlighting the factory's sustainable aspects and educating visitors on the legacy of the historic manufacturing facility as well as the vehicle manufacturing process that takes place within the manufacturing plant. The visitor experiences, designed by award-winning experience designer Bob Rogers and the design team BRC Imagination Arts, offers two multi-screen theaters, numerous touchscreen interpretive displays and overlook the world's largest "Green" roof, atop the factory. Visitors then walk through the working assembly plant.

== See also ==
- Architecture of metropolitan Detroit
- Automotive Hall of Fame
- Beamish Museum
- Blab school
- Carillon Historical Park
- Crossroads Village (Michigan)
- The Dearborn Inn
- Edison and Ford Winter Estates
- Fair Lane (Henry Ford's estate)
- Ford Piquette Avenue Plant
- Henry Ford Academy
- Heritage Park Historical Village
- Main Street Vehicles
- Rail transport in Walt Disney Parks and Resorts
- Tourism in metropolitan Detroit
