= William Ward (frontiersman) =

Early Kentucky settler

- Born: December 14, 1752; Augusta County, Virginia
- Died: December 24, 1822 (aged 70); Urbana, Ohio
- Resting place: Oak Dale Cemetery, Urbana, Ohio
- Occupations: frontiersman, soldier, state militia officer, politician, surveyor, merchant, land speculator
- Relatives: John Quincy Adams Ward (grandson); Edgar Melville Ward (grandson)

William Ward (December 14, 1752 – December 24, 1822) was the founder of Urbana, Ohio, and one of the original settlers in Kentucky's Mason County and Ohio's Mad River Valley.

== Early life and family ==
William Ward was born on December 14, 1752, in Augusta County, Virginia, the first son of Irish and Scotch-Irish immigrants James and Phoebe (Lockhart) Ward. His father, Captain James Ward, was born in County Donegal, Ireland and immigrated to the Colonies around 1730 as an infant with his father and two brothers.

Ward lived on the edge of the frontier his entire life. Shortly after William was born, his father moved the family from eastern Augusta County to the area now known as Greenbrier County, West Virginia. After Braddock's Defeat, that area became too hostile so James Ward moved his family closer toward Staunton while he joined several expeditions during the French and Indian War.

As a six-year-old, in 1758, Ward joined his father on horseback to travel to the family mill on the Jackson River near Fort Dinwiddie, which was located five miles west of Warm Springs in present-day Bath County, Virginia. They were unaware that William's three-year-old brother, John, had followed them on foot. A pair of Shawnee watched from the woods and stole John. Despite efforts to track the Shawnee in the light snow, the family was unable to locate John. Years later, the family learned that John was raised by the Shawnee and adopted the name of White Wolf.

== Revolutionary War service ==
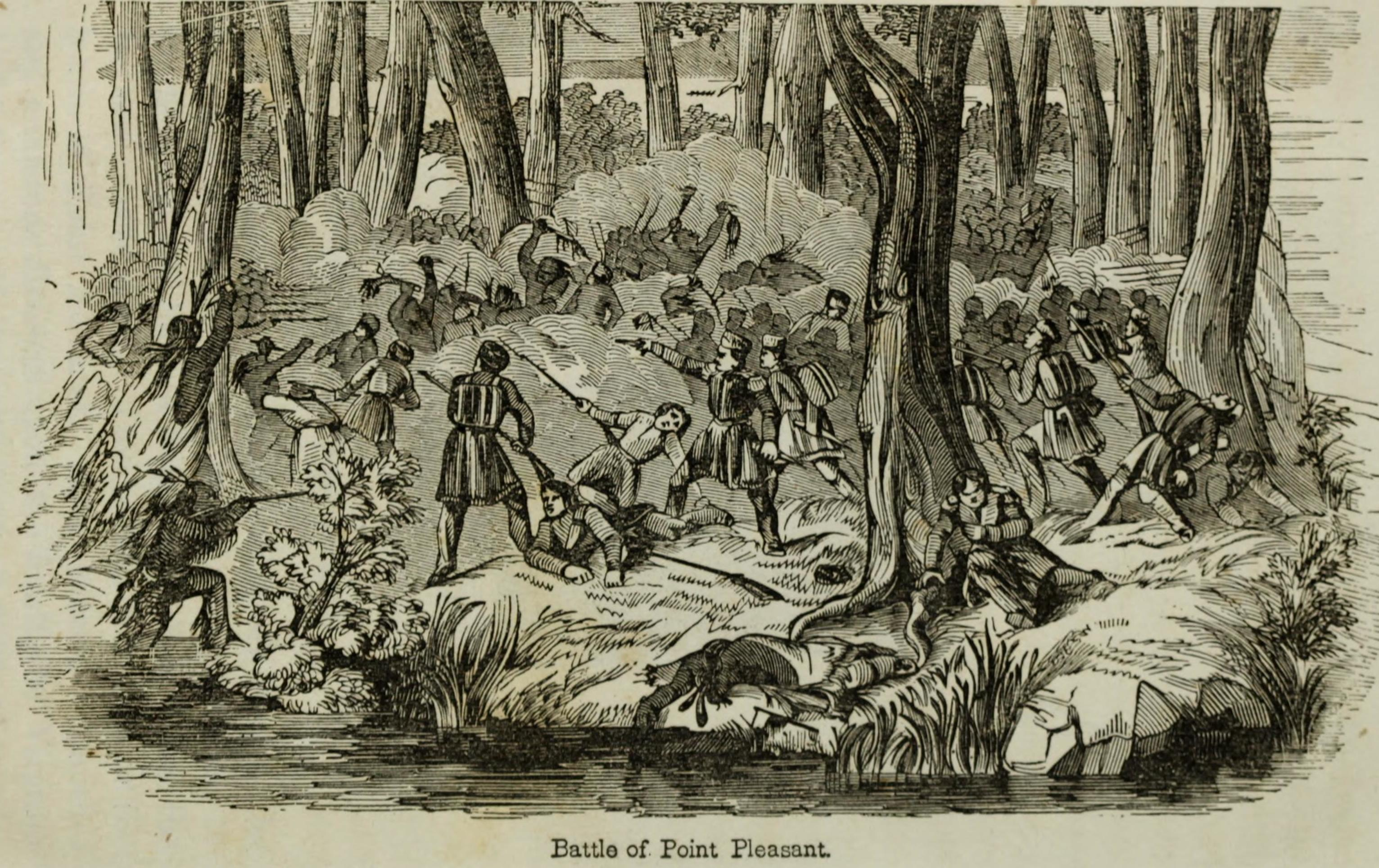
Ward fought in the Battle of Point Pleasant. His father, Captain James Ward, died in the battle.

In 1774, the royal governor of Virginia, Lord Dunmore, issued a call for volunteers to create a militia for retaliatory war against the Indian nations along the Ohio River. Ward volunteered to join his father's company from Botetourt County under the command of Colonel William Fleming. Ward was selected to serve as a sergeant. The company of Captain James Ward only consisted of seven men so at times it was amalgamated with the company of James's wife's brother-in-law Captain Mathew Arbuckle. William and his father fought at the Battle of Point Pleasant on October 10, 1774. When William's father, Captain James Ward, was killed in battle, William assumed command of the company. Years later, the family discovered that long-lost family member John Ward fought in the battle with his adopted Shawnees.

By 1777, William had been promoted to lieutenant and was serving at Fort Randolph and also the Greenbrier area with his mother's brother-in-law Captain Matthew Arbuckle. Ward was stationed at Fort Randolph on November 10, 1777, and witnessed the events leading up to the murder of the Shawnee chief, Cornstalk. In a deposition, also signed by what appears to be his future father-in-law, John Anderson, Ward describes that Cornstalk was murdered by a mob of armed men who were angry with the killing and scalping of Robert Gilmore. It is not clear if these men were militia or settlers. They entered the garrison as a mob. The previous day, Captain Matthew Arbuckle had imprisoned Cornstalk and his three companions. According to Ward, Arbuckle attempted to stop the mob but failed. Four Shawnee, including Chief Cornstalk, were murdered.

In 1781, Captain William Ward was the head of the militia for the Howard's/Anthony Creek area of Greenbrier.

== Early settlement of Greenbrier and Mason counties ==
After the Revolutionary War ended, Ward married Rebecca Anderson in Greenbrier. In 1782, he served as a trustee charged with the layout, establishment and organization of a town around the County Courthouse at Camp Union. The town became Lewisburg, West Virginia.

Between 1784 and 1786, he made forays into present-day Kentucky with his uncles, William and Joseph Ward, and staked large amounts of land and redeemed military land grants.

Ward and his family settled in Washington, near the river city of Limestone (later Maysville) in Mason County, Kentucky. He became a business associate with the frontier legend, Simon Kenton, and managed his store. Ward's two younger brothers, James and Charles, also settled in the area and remained there until their deaths.

Ward became an influential person in Mason County during the early 1790s and represented the county in 1792–95 in the House of Representatives in the Kentucky Legislature.

== Associate of Simon Kenton ==
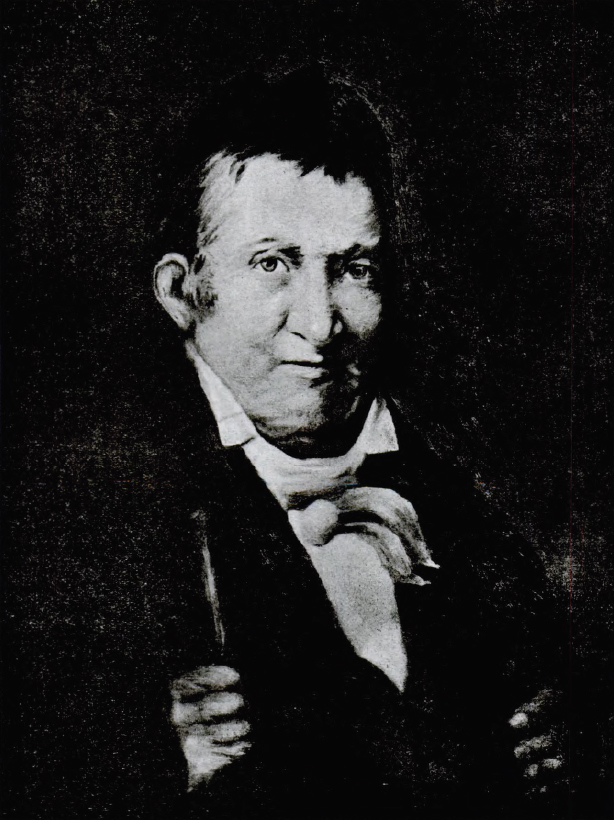
Simon Kenton (pictured) and William Ward were friends and business associates for more than three decades.

Simon Kenton and William Ward were no doubt the 'odd couple' of the Kentucky and Ohio frontiers. Kenton was an illiterate, buckskin-wearing, rough-talking physical giant who had lived in the frontier since he was 16. Only his contemporary Daniel Boone could possibly know the Kentucky frontier better than he. No one knew the Ohio frontier better than Simon Kenton. To sum up Ward in a phrase, he was a "Virginia gentleman". He was well educated, well spoken, and well dressed, and had a remarkable sense for business. Despite their differences, Kenton and Ward formed a partnership which lasted well over three decades.

Kenton and Ward's paths first crossed in 1774 at Point Pleasant as they were both involved in Lord Dunmore's War and were probably both at the signing of the Treaty of Camp Charlotte.

In March 1780, Ward traveled to Williamsburg, Virginia, to collect a land warrant on behalf of his father. His father had served with Captain John Dickinson's Company of Rangers in 1756–57 and as a result was entitled to 2,000 acres. Ward then traveled down the Ohio to present-day Maysville, Kentucky, and presented the warrant to Simon Kenton, who had claimed much of the land. On the warrant, Kenton's associate wrote: "William Ward, heir to James Ward, enters 2,000 acres by virtue of a military warrant, on a branch of a North Fork of Licking, called Wells's branch, including the mouth thereof, joining Cameron's Settlement and a pre-emption on the West side, and Beckley on the South, to begin at the head of said branch and to run down for quantity." The description of the 2,000 acres as described by Kenton on the warrant proved to be vague and was not fully defined until a Court of Appeals judgement in March 1801. The claim turned out be one of several suits between Ward and Kenton, and one of countless claims against Kenton regarding land in Kentucky.

In 1788, Ward, in association with Simon Kenton and Robert Rennick, contracted with John Cleves Symmes for large tracts of land in the current locations of Springfield and Urbana, Ohio. Later it was determined that Symmes did not have legal rights to make such sales.

Kenton and Ward started exploring the area of the Mad River Valley of Ohio and making claims as early as 1788. Kenton first saw the area a decade before while he was held as a prisoner with the Shawnees, while Ward was keen to explore the area for signs of his brother John.

In April 1793, his brother, John, known amongst the Shawnee as White Wolf, was killed by a militia group led by Kenton and Ward's brother, Captain James Ward.

In April 1799, Kenton and Ward led a group of families from Mason County, Kentucky to an area between present-day Springfield and Urbana.

Upon their arrival to the Mad River Valley, Kenton and Ward worked together to defuse a number of volatile situations where the Treaty of Greenville, which ended the Northwest Indian War in Ohio was close to collapse. Shortly after their arrival in 1799, Ward read an article in the inaugural edition of the Western Spy, a Cincinnati-based newspaper, that a group of Indians under the command of Black Snake were grouping in Detroit with the aim of breaking the treaty. Allegedly, Kenton and Ward immediately traveled to Detroit and secured a letter from Black Snake affirming they had no intention of breaking the treating. Ward wrote a letter which he and Kenton signed which was published in the August 27, 1799, issue of the Western Spy which defused the situation.

Years later, in 1806, the Shawnee chief, Tecumseh, grouped 700 warriors, all painted and plumed for war, at the mouth of Stony Creek, near present-day De Graff in Logan County. Kenton, Ward and Colonel James McPherson rode out to meet Tecumseh to determine his plans. Kenton was spokesman and tactfully declared, "we have plenty of men to greet you." After council with the three, Tecumseh meet with his fellow chiefs and deferred any belligerence.

By 1810, the Ward–Kenton–Rennick syndicate had amassed large holdings in the Springfield vicinity alone (astride the Mad River Valley) which spanned over 25,000 acres, or 40 square miles.

The relationship between Kenton and Ward passed through a lot of scrutiny as Kenton's fortunes disappeared in the early 1800s, while Ward's grew. Some accused Ward of taking advantage of the illiterate frontiersman who seemed more interested in helping others out than in making financial gain. Others simply acknowledged that Kenton was totally incapable of managing any form of business and extremely careless and lost his fortune through non-payment of taxes, while Ward was shrewd and very professional. In 1818, Kenton brought suit against Ward to claim his share of certain shares of Champaign County lands. Kenton lost the case as the court could not find that he was cheated or defrauded in any way by Ward.

== Founding of Urbana ==
In 1805, Colonel Ward appeared at the General Assembly in Chillicothe and successfully lobbied for the establishment of a new county to be made up of portions of Greene and Franklin Counties. Champaign County was formed on February 20, 1805 and extended on the north to Lake Erie and included all of present Clark County on the south.

Colonel Ward had the business sense and foresight to purchase 160 acres which he considered the logical and most acceptable site for Champaign's county seat. He approached the county commissioners with a proposition to locate the seat of the new county on this tract. Ward suggested that site to divided into 212 lots and 22 out-lots, half of which, selected alternately, were to be given to the county and while Ward would retain the remainder. Ward also offered two lots for a cemetery and a tract for the public square. The county commissioners approved the proposal, and Ward, with Joseph C. Vance, entered into a written agreement on October 11, 1805. Ward named the new county seat, Urbana.

Ward served on the inaugural board of trustees at Miami University in Oxford, Ohio in 1810.

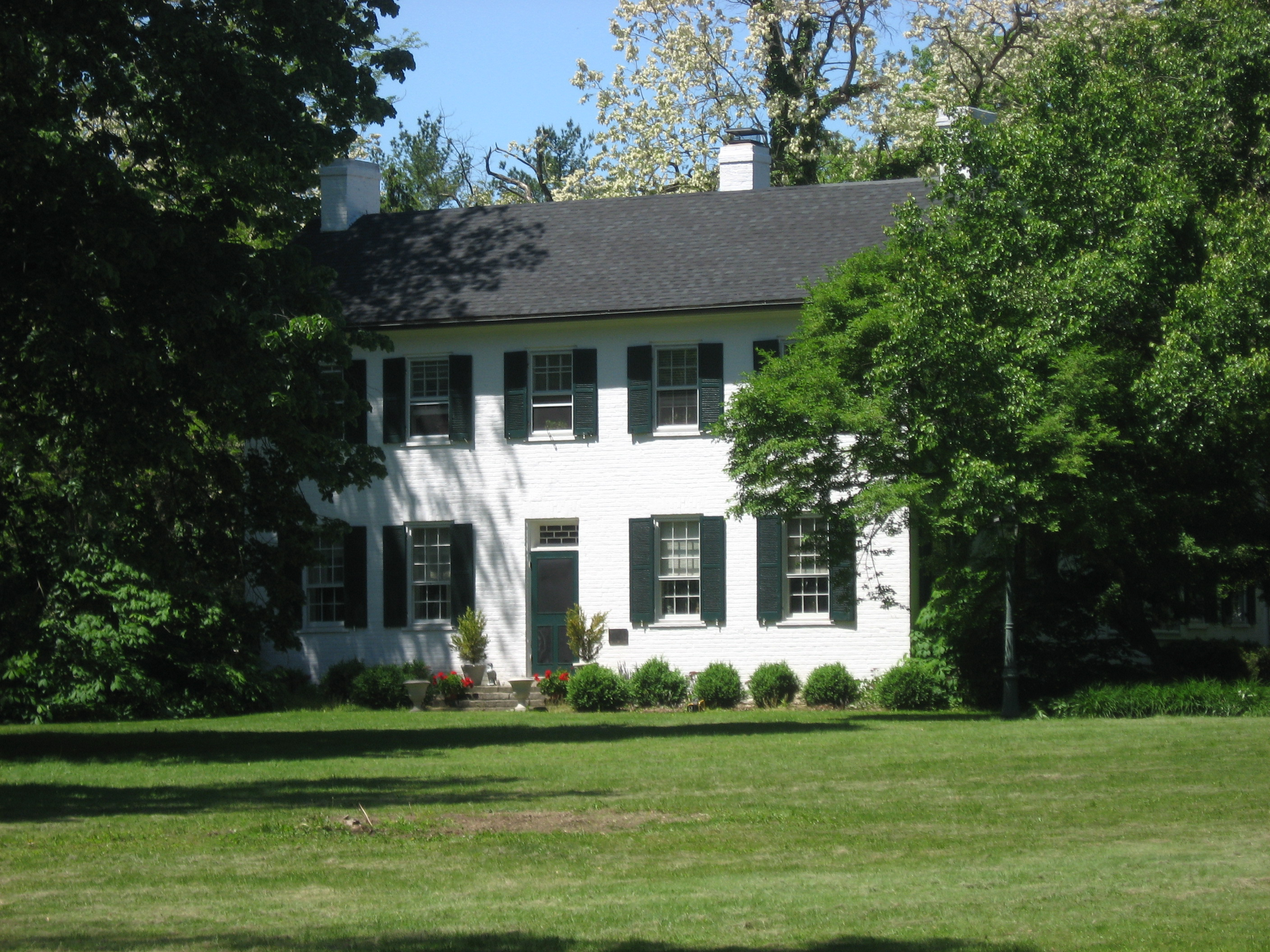
Colonel William Ward built this house for his son, John Anderson Ward, in Urbana in 1820. It is now known as the John Q.A. Ward House and placed on the National Register of Historic Places in 1974.

Colonel Ward was instrumental in developing Champaign County's first bank and grist mill in 1814.

William Ward was a large and quite distinguished man and well known in Champaign County at the turn of the 19th century. One of his contemporaries described him as follows: He was "tall and broad-shouldered, with high cheek bones, keen eyes and dark auburn hair tied with a black ribbon in a long queue, erect in person and very neat in dress. He wore but one style of hat – a black felt, with high crown and broad brim which was not turned up. He wore a black frock coat, or surtout, and on horseback he wore green flannel wrappers or leggings tied with ferreting below the knee."

== Death and descendants ==
Colonel Ward had seven children with his first wife, Rebecca Anderson, who died in 1805. He had four more children with his second wife, Margaret Barr, who died in 1867.

The renowned sculptor, John Quincy Adams Ward, and painter, Edgar Melville Ward are grandsons of Ward. Ward's younger brother, Captain James Ward, remained near Maysville, Kentucky and served as a pallbearer at the re-interment of Daniel Boone in 1845.

Ward died on Christmas Eve, December 24, 1822. He was initially buried with his first wife on the family homestead a few miles north of Springfield but was later re-interred at the Oak Dale Cemetery in Urbana.
