= James Ward (frontiersman) =

American politician

Captain James Ward
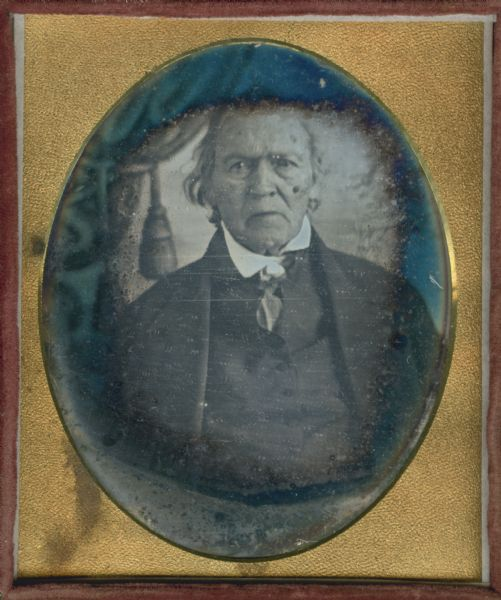
- Captain James Ward ca 1845
- Born: September 19, 1763; Augusta County, Virginia
- Died: February 27, 1846 (aged 82); Maysville, Mason, Ohio
- Resting place: Washington Baptist Church Cemetery in Old Washington, Mason County, Kentucky
- Occupations: frontiersman, soldier, state militia officer, politician
- Spouse: Margaret Machir
- Relatives: William Ward (frontiersman) (brother)

Captain James Ward (September 19, 1763 – February 27, 1846) was an early American settler, fighter against Native Americans and legislator of Kentucky whose adventures featured heavily in the stories of the western frontier. He was a pall bearer at Daniel Boone's re-interment in 1845.

== Early life ==
Ward was born on September 19, 1763, in Staunton, Virginia, the third son of Scotch-Irish immigrants James and Phoebe (Lockhart) Ward. His father, Captain James Ward, was born in County Donegal, Ireland and immigrated to the Colonies around 1730 as an infant with his father and two brothers.

Ward's family lived on the edge of the frontier during his childhood. Before James was born, his father moved the family from eastern Augusta County to the area now known as Greenbrier County, West Virginia. After Braddock's Defeat in 1755 that area became too hostile so James Ward Sr. moved his family closer toward Staunton while he joined several expeditions during the French and Indian War.

In 1758 – five years before James was born – his father managed a mill on the Jackson River near Fort Dinwiddie, which was located five miles west of Warm Springs in present-day Bath County, Virginia. During this time a pair of Shawnee captured James's older brother, John, who was three years old at the time. James would spend the first three decades of his life looking for his older brother – a quest which would continuously drive him deeper into the frontier and on countless encounters with the Shawnee and other tribes.

After the Treaty of Hard Labour and the Treaty of Fort Stanwix in 1768, many settlers, including the Ward family pushed west again into the area currently known as Greenbrier County, West Virginia. The Ward family established a homestead on the Anthony Creek.

== Flatboat cruise ==
James Ward has been immortalized in the 19th century books of adventure on the western frontier with the tale of his flatboat cruise down the Ohio River in 1785. The story relates how Ward navigated a 45-foot long flatboat laden with horses and people down the Ohio. Ward had travelled several days without incident and had become complacent when they drifted toward the north bank, or the Ohio side of the river, and were attacked by several hundred Indians. Ward, who would have been a mere lad of 22 years old at the time, knew that he needed to navigate the boat to the center of the river to ensure safety. Before he could do so his nephew was shot and killed as well as the horses. One of the passengers, who reportedly was a captain in the Continental Army during the Revolutionary War, fell to the bottom of the boat and screamed in terror, will bullets sailed over the boat. A 300-pound Dutchman tried in vain to seek cover but despite all efforts he was unable to get his 'posterial luxuriance' behind the safety of a gunwale. He finally lost his patience and stood up and shouted at the Indians, "Oh, now! quit tat tamned nonsense tere, will you?" Ward maintained his calm and navigated the boat for an hour until the Indians gave up chase.

The story appears to have originated from John McClung's Sketches of Western Adventure published first in 1832. McClung was a resident of Maysville and no doubt would have heard the story first hand from Ward. The story was later picked up and published in nearly every subsequent account of life on the frontier.

== Northwest Indian War ==
During the Northwest Indian War from 1785 to 1795, either James Ward or his brother Charles Ward participated in retaliatory raids against the Indian tribes in Ohio. The Ward brothers had a vested interest in these expeditions as it was their hope that they would find their brother, John, who was stolen by the Shawnee in 1758.

In 1786, Ward served with the Kentucky Militia during Logan's Raid, an expedition led by Colonel Benjamin Logan into the Mad River Valley.

In 1791, he was with Colonel John Edwards, the future Kentucky Senator, on his "Blackberry Expedition". In this abortive campaign undertaken against the Indians in the early summer a party under Captain Edward went out to attack the Indian villages, but, when they neared them, they lost heart, filled themselves with blackberries, and returned.

Ward was commissioned as a captain with the 15th Regiment of the 4th Brigade in August 1792.

Ward was an officer of a party led by Simon Kenton to follow a group of Shawnee who had stolen horses in Mason County. Kenton and Ward found the party of Shawnees, which included Tecumseh, at Paint Creek in Ross County, Ohio, in April 1793 and surrounded their camp at night with a plan to attack at first light. Kenton's plan failed and the attack began at night and Tecumseh and his party escaped. One Shawnee was mortally wounded – White Wolf, the long lost brother of Captain James Ward. This story was repeated in many of the annals of Western adventure.

Captain Ward joined General "Mad" Anthony Wayne on his campaign in 1794 which culminated in the Battle of Fallen Timbers, which was the decisive battle which ended the Northwest Indian War.

== Kentucky politician ==
Ward represented Mason County in the Kentucky House of Representatives in 1810, 1816 and 1818 and the Senate from 1823 to 1827.

== Daniel Boone's funeral ==
Captain James Ward was one of the 11 pallbearers at the re-burial of Daniel Boone on September 13, 1845, in Frankfort, Kentucky. A chronicler of the event wrote: "…and then came Captain James Ward, whose encounters with and escapes from the Indians are of the most remarkable that the annals of Kentucky – nearly every page of which is the recital of boldness and bravery – furnish. He was fittingly chosen to follow to his grave the defender of Boonesborough."

== Family life and death ==
Ward married Margaret Machir on June 11, 1795, in Mason County, Kentucky. They had seven children. Ward and his wife resided in Mason County near Maysville and kept up to 12 slaves. Ward was a Presbyterian elder in the Washington Presbyterian Church, under Rev. Robert Wilson. Margaret died in 1831 while James died on 27 February 1846. He is buried at the Washington Baptist Church Cemetery in Old Washington, Mason County, Kentucky.

Ward's older brother, Colonel William Ward, was a business associate of Simon Kenton and was the founder of Urbana, Ohio.
