= Annie L. Y. Orff =

American editor and publisher (d. 1914)

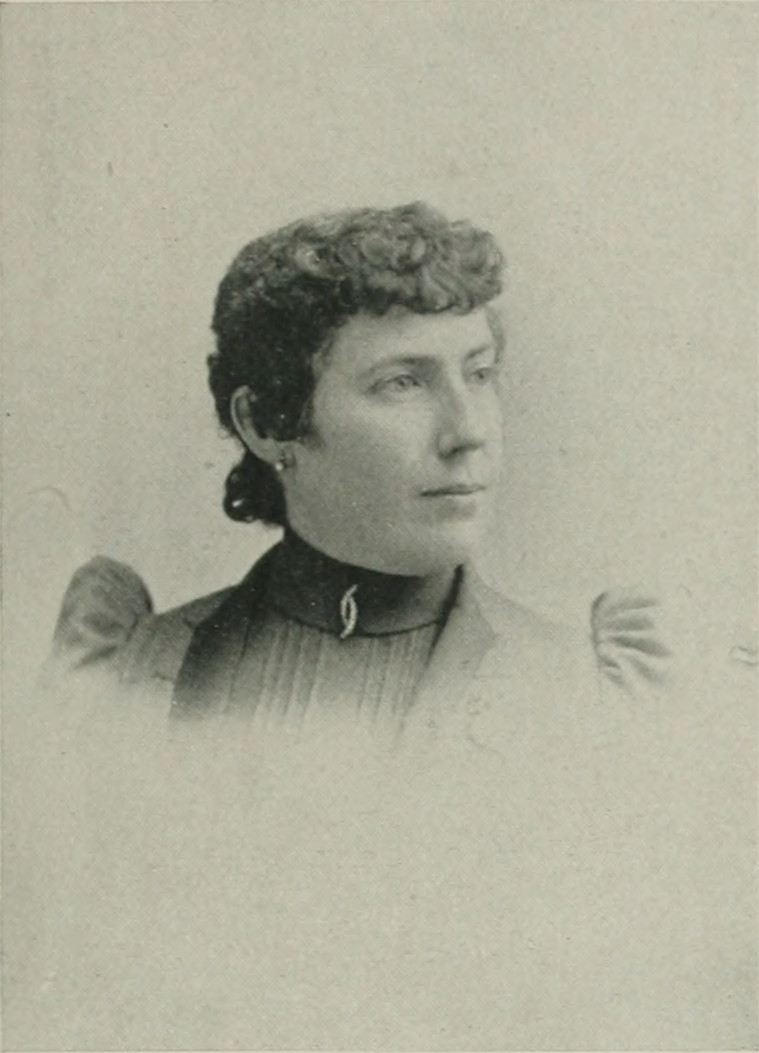
- "A Woman of the Century"
- Born: Annie Laurie Yuill Johnstone; 1861; Albany, New York
- Died: March 16, 1914 (aged 52–53); St. Louis, Missouri, U.S.
- Other name: Annie L. Y. Swart
- Occupations: journalist; magazine editor and publisher

Signature
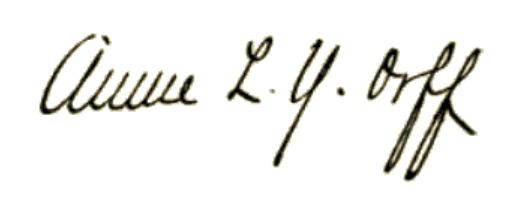

Annie L. Y. Orff (née, Annie L. Y. Johnstone; after first marriage, Annie L. Y. Swart; after second marriage, Anne L. Y. Orff; d. March 16, 1914) was an American journalist, and a magazine editor and publisher, gaining success through her persistent efforts. At one time, Orff had the distinction of being the only "quarter-of-a-century" woman publisher. According to Herringshaw (1901), she was at one time the leading successful female publisher in the U.S.

== Early life ==
Annie Laurie Yuill Johnstone was born in Albany, New York. She was of Scotch parentage. Her father was Peter Napier Johnstone, a native of Edinburgh, Scotland, and her mother, Marion Hart, of Glasgow. Marion was a sister of the Hudson River School artists Julie Hart Beers James McDougal Hart, and William Hart, of New York City. The painters Letitia Bonnet Hart and Mary Theresa Hart were Orff's cousins.

Orff passed the early part of her life in her native city, where she had a happy childhood.

== Career ==
=== Time ===
At the age of 18, she married Edward R. Swart, who was in the ocean fish business. They removed to St. Louis, Missouri in 1884. After a brief married life, she was widowed, and dependent upon herself for support.

There existed, at that time, a railroad guide, a small publication that its owner wanted to convert into a weekly issue that would be of service to the traveling public, giving exact tables of the twelve railroads culminating in St. Louis. The first step necessary to be taken was to secure a successful canvasser for its subscription list and to solicit advertising matters. Swart became that marketer, and was retained on the publication for a few years in the capacity of canvasser.

Orff served as the editor and business manager of the little red railway guide called Time, the first of the guides and folders widely distributed later. It was known from Maine to California among the railroad men, especially in the Mississippi Valley. This railway guide was published before the folders later supplied by the railroad companies and gave a correct timetable of the different roads, subject to monthly revision. Orff had learned to correct railroad time in the office of the Vandalia Line. She was soon calling out columns of figures with such accuracy and dispatch that she was termed an expert time corrector. She quickly saw the possibilities of a railway guide endorsed by all the roads. Advertisements were inserted in this booklet — the railroads subscribing for thousands of copies for general distribution. From office to office, she went gathering the changes necessary to keep proper time in the railway guide, making friends with the officials through her business-like and gracious manner. Though she was offered a permanent position in several offices, the Time booklet, with its advertising advantages, was far more profitable, netting her an income annually of US$7,000 for many years.

Time was small in size —a pocket edition- which could readily be carried and used as a handy reference by the traveling public. Orff made this book a success with sheer tact and energy. It was her strong personality that drew the business. When she first began to publish her railway guide, men were not accustomed to having a woman step into their private offices to solicit business, but with finesse, she was granted interviews which usually resulted in obtaining a contract for subscriptions or advertising, and often both. In 14 months after taking charge, Orff found herself the sole owner of the publication and had also found her vocation.

=== Chaperone ===
When the railroads printed their own folders, Orff decided to establish a chaperone bureau for the purpose of supplying female guides to visiting women in the city.

Orff then originated the idea of issuing a magazine that would be devoted to the interests of women, and in April, 1890, began preparations to publish the Chaperone, a full-size magazine artistically' illustrated, and filled with matters of general interest to women as well as stories by the leading fiction writers of the day. Fashion and domestic affairs, besides a fund of general information on interesting topics, quickly made it a favorite in the family circle and well received by literary critics. For 14 years, this magazine maintained an exhibit at St. Louis' old Exhibition Hall. It was always the center of interest and universally conceded to be one of the most attractive booths in the building.

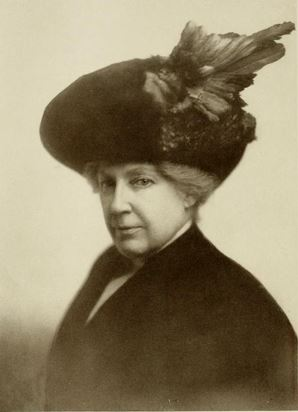
Mrs. Orff (photo by the Gerhard Sisters, 1914)

In 1891, shortly after the inauguration of the Chaperone, she married Frank Nicholas K. Orff (1862-1922) who was associated with her in the publication of the magazine.

=== American Woman's Review ===
In 1904, a change was made in the size and name of the publication. Since then, the magazine was known as the American Woman's Review. It was issued monthly in the interest of organized and federated women, telling by word and picture the happenings and progress of woman's work throughout the world. The magazine was run on a successful and paying basis for 24 years, and was published in its own office. At the time, Orff had the distinction of being the only "quarter-of-a-century" woman publisher.

The American Woman's Review had an international subscription list, and an amusing incident in connection with soliciting foreign business occurred when a Japanese person offered to exchange bulbs of a cinnamon vine for an advertisement in her magazine. He sent her several barrels of them —each no larger than a peanut— so there was nothing else to do with such a quantity but offer them in turn as premiums for subscriptions, and in that way introduce the vine into the U.S. Soon, the beautiful foliage of the cinnamon vines, which were hardy and prolific, became a prominent part of the garden decorations of many States, and particularly Missouri.

=== St. Louise Elite ===
She was also the publisher of the St. Louise Elite, a weekly society journal.

=== World's Fairs ===
In every World's Fair, Orff held the position of Lady Manager, a representative of women from the State of Missouri. Her appointment by Governor David R. Francis as lady manager of the World's Columbian Exposition (1893) was one for which she was exceptionally well qualified. During this time, she made a close study of conditions governing women in business, obtaining facts and figures showing the percentage of women's work done in her State. Giving out the concessions to women of Missouri was one of her duties, but strange to say, the only one who made application was Mrs. Rosa Sonneschein, wife of Rabbi Solomon H. Sonneschein, of St. Louis. She made bags of all descriptions, selling them at a booth in the Woman's Building. At the close of the fair, her net profits were US$5,000.

Orff was appointed representative of women's work in Missouri for the Paris Exposition (1900), receiving her commission from Governor Lawrence Vest Stephens. At this exposition, she originated a "Made-in-St. Louis" show.

"Made-in-St. Louis" became a bit of clever advertising. Orff sent out letters to women, interesting them in the benefits that would accrue to husbands, fathers, and brothers if all the manufacturers in this city took up her suggestion that an exhibition of their goods be held at a specified time. This found favor at once and the result was so successful that the "Made-in-St.-Louis Show" became an annual event. Throughout the U.S., Orff was known as pushing her own city — advertising St. Louis.

== Personal life ==
Soon after she married Edward Swart, he went to Texas, traveling on business. There, he was stricken with dengue fever. Mrs. Swart went down to nurse him and stayed three weeks. He seemed to gain health, though the doctors gave him quinine and whisky. This treatment, she believed, began the trouble with his brain. When he seemed to grow stronger, Mrs. Swart returned to St. Louis, but it was over two months before Mr. Swart came back. When she met him at the Union Depot, she scarcely recognized him. He had lost a lot of weight and had an odd look in his eyes. For thirteen months, his mental capacity diminished. Mrs. Swart wrote to her in-laws who came and took Mr. Swart and put him in an asylum. Nine months later, he disappeared from the asylum. Then came news of an accident on a railway where a man had both legs cut off, someplace out of Kansas City. Mrs. Swart decided not to go and identify the remains as it had already cost her so much trying to track her husband down.

Mrs. Swart secured a divorce from Mr. Swart on December 10, 1891. Desertion was the cause urged in the divorce proceedings. She obtained a divorce at a time when there appeared to be doubt as to her first husband's death, so as to avoid laying herself open to bigamy charges.

She married Frank Orff in St. Louis on 22 December 1891. Frank Orff was associated with his wife in the publishing business, as well as other enterprises. He was an active political worker and was president of the St. Louis Progressive Club. Mr. and Mrs. Orff had no children, but they adopted Mrs. Orff's three nephews while very young, whom they reared and established in successful business occupations.

Notwithstanding the business activity which took Orff from the Atlantic to the Pacific Coast many times annually, she was a home-loving woman and her artistic taste asserted itself in the furnishing and adornment of her house. The dwelling designed by her in St. Louis on Washington Avenue was known as "Fairyland" because of the effective and original system of electric lighting, as well as beautiful works of art in pictures and sculpture. Many of her paintings, as well as those of her uncles, adorned the walls of her home. This was completed in time for the World's Columbian Exposition, and many noted people from foreign countries were entertained there by Orff, interested in discussions regarding politics, art, and science.

Orff lent her influence and support to the work of building the Baptist Orphans' Home, the first money collected towards this fund being US$100 from 100 rose bushes donated by a Mr. Shaw, which Orff sold, and the year following, he donated 100 more for the same institution.

Orff planned to make a home for 2,000 boys on her farm in Missouri, where they could earn money for use in learning any trade or profession for which they felt themselves adapted. She proposed in connection with this plan to have these boys live in her Locust Street Inn in the city while they were studying in the winter months.

Annie L. Y. Orff died of paralysis in her St. Louis bathroom on March 16, 1914. She had a paralytic stroke three weeks earlier, but was recovering when a second stroke limited her to her bed. A third stroke was fatal.
