= William Hart (painter) =

American painter (1823-1894)

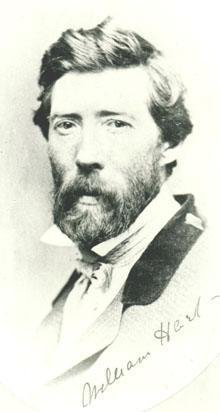
- William Hart c. 1858-1868
- Born: March 31, 1823; Paisley, Scotland
- Died: June 17, 1894 (aged 71); Mount Vernon, New York, US
- Education: Jules-Joseph Lefebvre
- Known for: Landscape art, Painting
- Movement: Hudson River School

William Hart (March 31, 1823 – June 17, 1894), was a Scottish-born American landscape and cattle painter, and Hudson River School artist. His younger brother, James McDougal Hart, and his younger sister, Julie Hart Beers, were also Hudson River School artists, and his nieces Letitia Bonnet Hart and Mary Theresa Hart became well-known painters as well. Another niece, Annie L. Y. Orff, became an editor and publisher. He studied under Jules-Joseph Lefebvre.

== Life and work ==
William Hart was born in Paisley, Scotland, and in 1831 emigrated to the United States with his family, settling in Albany, New York. He was apprenticed to a decorative painter in Albany and Troy, New York, and his first artistic experience was in decorating the panels of coaches with landscapes. He also spent time as a portrait painter, likely after 1834. He toured the mid-western States, predominantly Michigan, during the late 1830s seeking portrait commissions, and was unsuccessful. He exhibited his first work at the National Academy of Design in 1848, and returned to Albany permanently in 1849. In late 1849, he was underwritten by Dr. James H. Armsby to travel to Europe to study landscape painting. He painted primarily in Scotland until 1852, after which he returned to Albany, and then in 1853, moved to New York City. By the time he returned to America, Hart had shifted his energy to landscape painting. Like most of the major American landscape artists of the time, Hart settled in New York City, where he opened a studio in the Tenth Street Studio Building in 1858. In 1865, he was elected President of the Brooklyn Academy of Design.

Hart was a full member of the National Academy in 1858, and continued to show his paintings there regularly through the mid-1870s. He also exhibited at the Brooklyn Art Association and at major exhibitions around the country. Hart was a member of the American Watercolor Society, and was its president from 1870 to 1873.

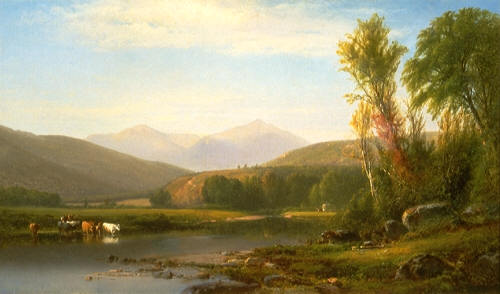
Mount Madison from the Androscoggin River, 1862 depiction of Mount Madison

His mature landscape style embraced the mannerism of the late Hudson River School by emphasizing light and atmosphere. He became particularly adept at depicting angled sunlight and foreground shadow; the best examples of this are: Seashore Morning (1866) in the Metropolitan Museum of Art, New York; After the Storm (1860s) in the Museum of Fine Arts, Boston; The Last Gleam (1865) in the High Museum of Art in Atlanta, Georgia; Sunset in the Valley (1870) in a private collection, featured on pp. 82–83 of All That is Glorious Around Us: Paintings from the Hudson River School by John Driscoll.

Later works are indicative of Hart's prolific and occasionally formulaic paintings of cows. Cattle were a popular motif in Hudson River School art, and nearly every artist included them in at least some of their landscapes as diminutive symbols of man's harmonious relationship with nature. Some artists, including William and James Hart along with Thomas Bigelow Craig, made a specialty of cow portraits. These paintings, which were very popular with late-19th-century American collectors, typically featured several cattle grazing or watering in the foreground or middle distance with the landscape playing a supporting role as a bucolic backdrop. G.W. Sheldon wrote in 1879 that Hart's later landscapes "may be found in almost all the auction-rooms where pictures are sold, and in almost all the principal private collections in the Atlantic cities."

Hart was also known for his exceptional etchings. In 1883 the Art Department of the New England Manufacturers' and Mechanics' Institute, Boston, held an important exhibition of contemporary American art. Concentrating largely upon American drawings and etchings the exhibition catalogue listed 731 important works of original art. William Hart's iconic etching, "Naponock (Naponoch) Scenery, Ulster County, New York", was first exhibited at this exposition and is listed in the catalogue under number 362. An oil on canvas work from 1883, also of Naponock (Naponoch) scenery, is in the collection of the Metropolitan Museum of Art - a direct bequest from Hart's daughter, Jessie Hart White. In 1885, Hart painted A Quiet Nook which is now in the Smithsonian American Art Museum, Washington D.C.

The Albany Institute of History & Art has in its collection over 400 sketches, water colors, and sketch books which were retained en masse from the artist's studio after his death, by the family of the subsequent donor. Since each piece is signed, dated, and annotated with the location of its subject, many previously unsigned and unattributed paintings are now being associated with the artist. The museum is preparing an exhibition of this material.

Hart died in Mount Vernon, New York, on June 17, 1894. His daughter Jessie Hart White was the mother of E. B. White. He is interred at Green-Wood Cemetery in Brooklyn, New York City.

== See also ==
- List of Hudson River School artists
- The Hart Project, Dr. Mark Sullivan and Seth I Rosen
- Expanded Bibliography on William Hart and James M. Hart
- References and Notes, with relevant hyperlinks for further reading
- Sullivan, Mark W. James M. and William Hart, American Landscape Painters. Philadelphia: John Warren, 1983.
