= Thomas Craig =

Thomas Craig may refer to:

== Sportsmen ==
- Tom Craig (footballer) (fl. 1955–1968), Scottish footballer (Dumbarton FC, East Stirlingshire)
- Tom Craig (field hockey) (born 1995), Australian field hockey player
- Tommy Craig (born 1950), Scottish footballer
- Tully Craig (1897–1963), Scottish footballer and manager, born Thomas Craig

== Artists ==
- Tom Craig (artist) (1906–1969), American watercolorist, see List of Guggenheim Fellowships awarded in 1941
- Thomas Bigelow Craig (1849–1924), American landscape painter

== Politicians ==
- Thomas Dixon Craig (1842–1905), Canadian politician
- Thomas S. Crago (1866–1925), U.S. politician

== Others ==
- Sir Thomas Craig (jurist) (1538–1608), Scottish jurist and poet
- Thomas Craig (actor) (born 1962), English actor
- Tom Craig (photographer) (born 1974), British documentary photographer
- Thomas Craig (mathematician) (1855–1900), American professor
