= Curry School =

Curry School may refer to:

- Curry College, a private college in Milton, Massachusetts
- Curry Normal and Industrial Institute, a former school for African Americans in Urbana, Ohio
- University of Virginia School of Education and Human Development, Charlottesville, Virginia, formerly the Curry School of Education
