= Mary Hart (disambiguation) =

Mary Hart (born 1950) is an American television personality.

Mary Hart may also refer to:

- Mary Theresa Hart (1872–1942), American artist and illustrator
- Mary Seymour (1548–?), possible married name Mary Hart, daughter of Catherine Parr and Thomas Seymour
- Mary de Vere (c. 1554–1624), married name Mary Hart, English noble
- Lynne Roberts (1922–1978), American actress, also credited as Mary Hart
- The Mary Hart Show, a fictional talk show which stars Mary Hart as the title role within the ABC Family comedy show Baby Daddy
