= Richings =

Richings is a surname. Notable people with the surname include:

- Caroline Richings (1832-1882), Anglo-American composer, impresario and singer
- G. F. Richings (1852–1915), American writer
- Hannah Richings, British singer
- Julian Richings (born 1956), British-Canadian actor
- Timothy Richings (born 1962), English cricketer
