= James McDougal Hart =

British-American painter

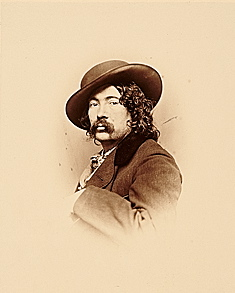
- James M. Hart (ca. 1865-1867). Photo by Rockwood.
- Born: May 10, 1828; Kilmarnock, Ayrshire, Scotland
- Died: October 24, 1901 (aged 73); Brooklyn, New York
- Education: Hudson River School
- Known for: Landscape art, Painting

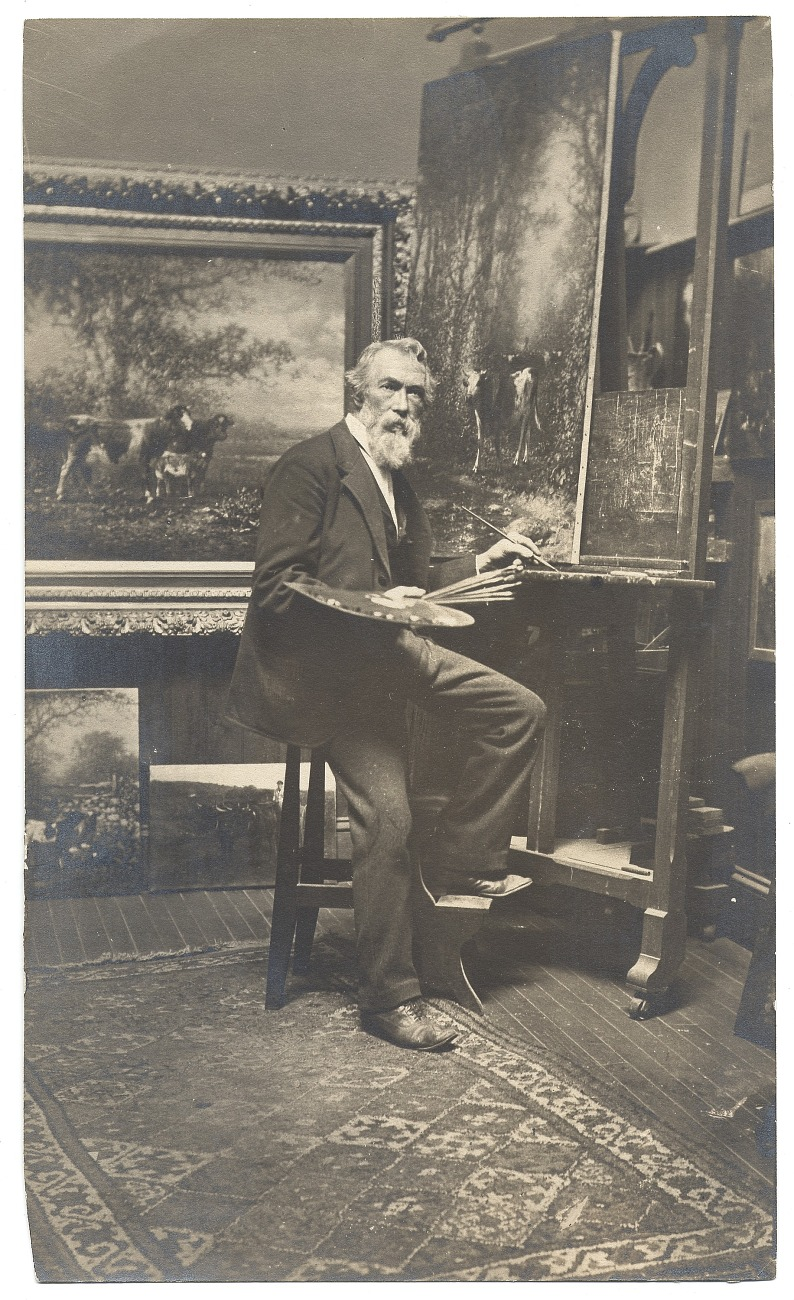
James McDougal Hart, ca. 1890

James McDougal Hart (May 10, 1828 – October 24, 1901) was an American landscape and cattle painter of the Hudson River School.

== Family and education ==
Hart was born in Kilmarnock, Scotland, and was taken to America with his family in early youth. His older brother, William Hart, was also a Hudson River School artist, as were his younger sister Julie Hart Beers and his two daughters, both figure painters, Letitia Bonnet Hart (1867–1953) and Mary Theresa Hart (1872–1942). Another niece, Annie L. Y. Orff, became an editor and publisher.

In Albany, New York he trained with a sign and carriage maker—possibly the same employer that had taken on his brother in his early career. James later returned to Europe for serious artistic training, studying in Munich and as a pupil of Friedrich Wilhelm Schirmer at the Kunstakademie Düsseldorf. He is associated with the Düsseldorf school of painting.

== Career ==
Hart returned to America in 1853. He exhibited his first work at the National Academy of Design in 1848 and became an associate in 1857 and a full member in 1859. He was particularly devoted to the National Academy, exhibiting there over a period of more than forty years and serving as vice president late in his life from 1895 to 1899. Like his brother William, James also exhibited at the Brooklyn Art Association (he lived for a time in Brooklyn) and at major exhibitions around the country.

Along with most of the major landscape artists of the time, Hart based his operations in New York City and adopted the style of the Hudson River School. While he and his brother William often painted similar landscape subjects, James may have been more inclined to paint exceptionally large works. An example is The Old Homestead (1862), 42 x 68 inches, in the collection of the High Museum of Art in Atlanta, Georgia. James may have been exposed to large paintings while studying in Düsseldorf, a center of realist art pedagogy that also shaped the practices of Albert Bierstadt and Worthington Whittredge.

Like his brother William, James excelled at painting cattle. Kevin J. Avery writes, "the bovine subjects that once distinguished [his works] now seem the embodiment of Hart's artistic complacency." In contrast with the complacency of some of his cattle scenes, his major landscape paintings are considered important works of the Hudson River School. A particularly fine example is Summer in the Catskills, now in the Thyssen-Bornemisza Museum in Madrid, Spain.

Among Hart's students was the Hudson River School painter Evelina Mount.

Hart is interred at Green-Wood Cemetery in Brooklyn, New York.

== Gallery ==
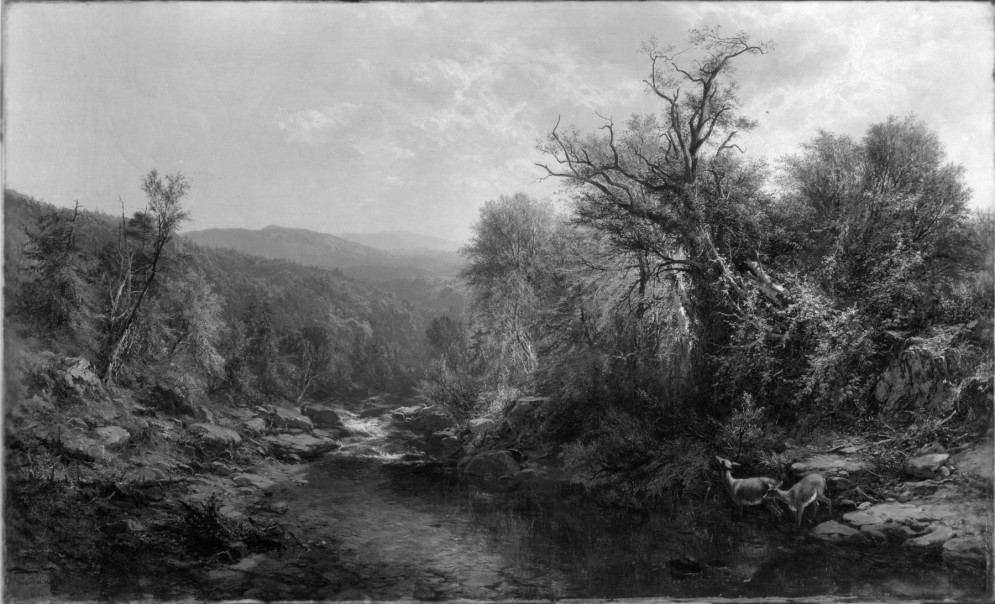
A Stream in the Adirondacks (1859), oil on canvas, 21.125 x 35.25 inch.; collection of Walters Art Museum

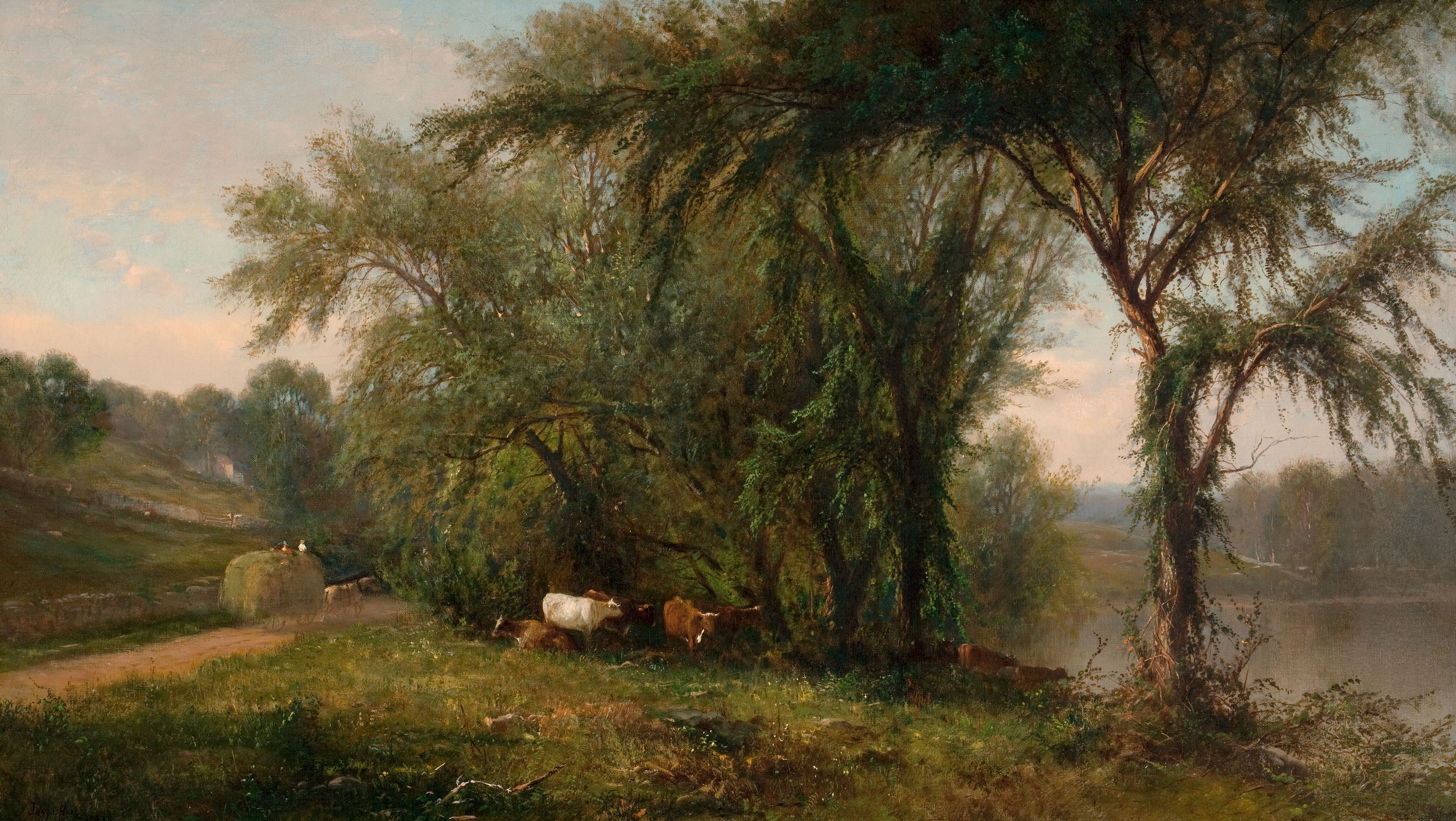
Gleneida Lake, Putnam County, New York (1863), oil on canvas, 17.5 inch. x 30.25 inch.

Cows Watering (1865), oil on canvas, 26.75 inch. x 56.75 inch.

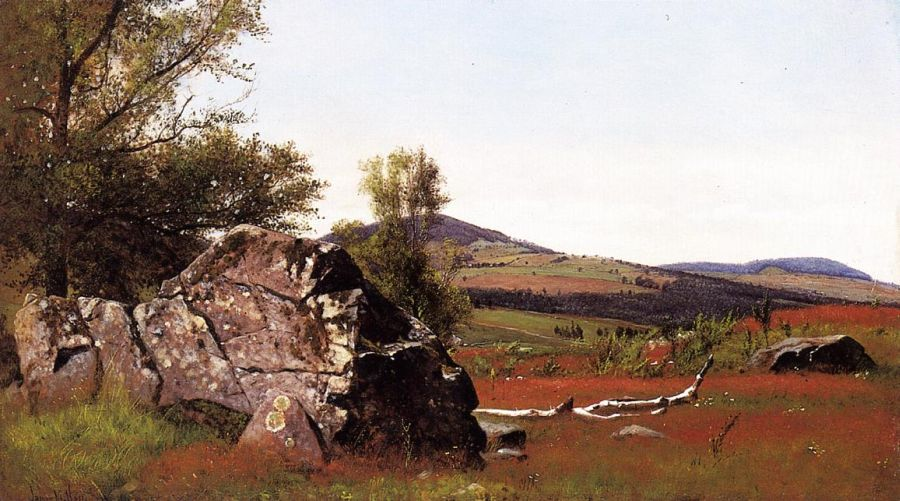
Summer in the Catskills (1865), oil on canvas, collection of Thyssen-Bornemisza Museum

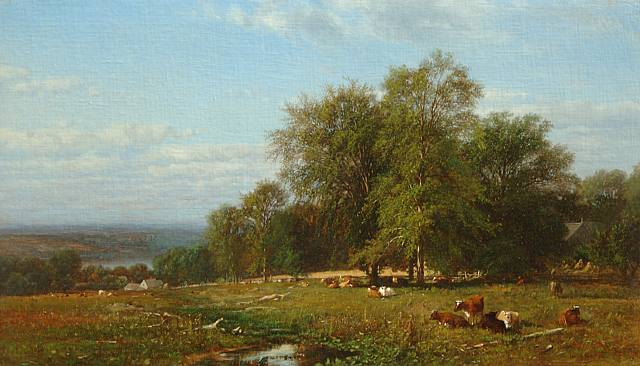
Harriman New York Overlooking the Hudson

Landscape with Stone Bridge, Pencil on paper, 5.5 inch. x 7.8125 inch., collection of Walters Art Museum

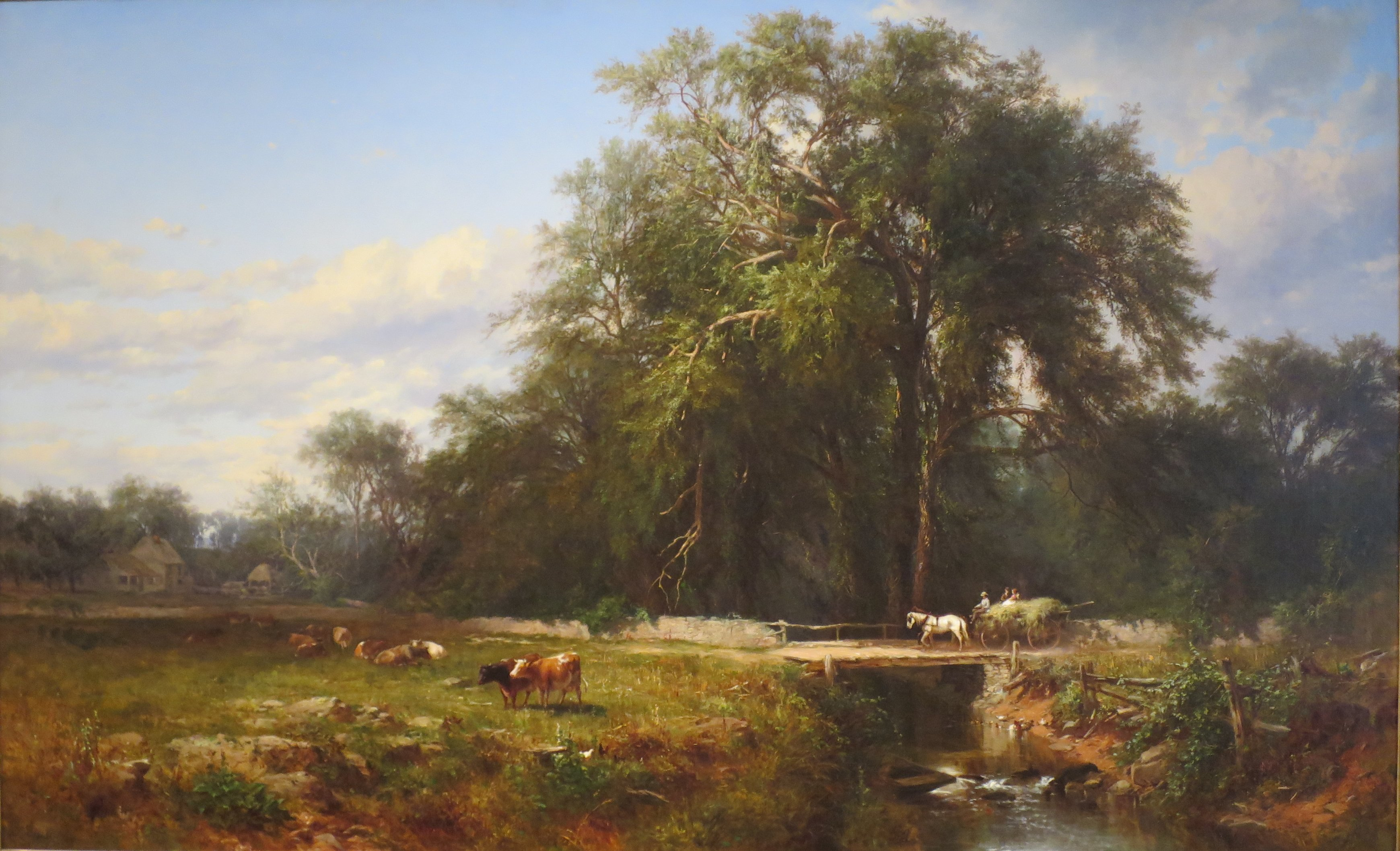
The Old Homestead (1862), oil on canvas, High Museum of Art

== See also ==
- List of Hudson River School artists
- Full biography of William and James M. Hart, Dr. Mark W. Sullivan and Seth I Rosen, The Hart Project
- Sullivan, Mark W. James M. and William Hart, American Landscape Painters. Philadelphia: John Warren, 1983.
- Sabine Morgen: Die Ausstrahlung der Düsseldorfer Schule nach Amerika im 19. Jahrhundert. Düsseldorfer Bilder in Amerika und amerikanische Maler in Düsseldorf mit Künstlerlexikon auf CD-ROM, Edition Ruprecht, Göttingen 2008, ISBN 978-3-7675-3059-1 (= Göttinger Beiträge zur Kunstgeschichte, Band 2) [Hart's painting and biography discussed]
