= Andy Detwiler =

American farmer (1969–2022)

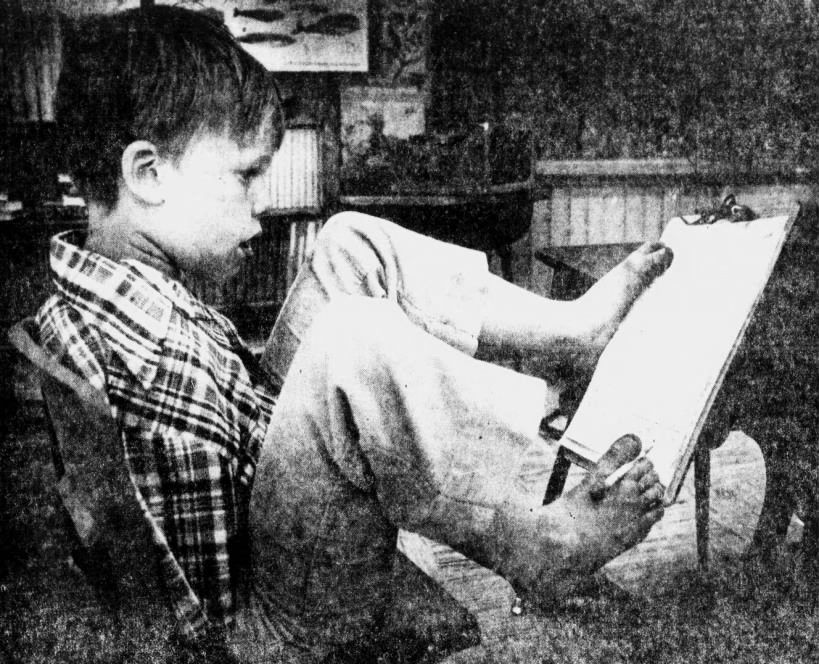
- Detwiler in 1979
- Born: Thomas Andrew Detwiler; November 24, 1969; Urbana, Ohio, U.S.
- Died: September 21, 2022 (aged 52); Urbana, Ohio, U.S.
- Occupation: Farmer
- Spouse: Corkey Wallace (m. 1996)
- Children: 1

Thomas Andrew Detwiler (November 24, 1969 – September 21, 2022), known professionally as Harmless Farmer, was an American farmer who lost both of his arms in an accident as a very young child, and was known for his videos on YouTube.

== Life and career ==
Thomas Andrew Detwiler was born in Urbana, Ohio, the son of Thomas Detwiler, a farmer, and Patricia Simpson, a middle school teacher. He had a sister and a brother. At the age of two, his paternal grandfather Lawrence Bick Detwiler was working on a screw conveyor. He came up to his grandfather and imitated him, but came too close to the screw conveyor, losing both of his arms and receiving cuts to his face. He was rushed to the hospital.

Detwiler attended Salem Elementary School. At the age of nine, he was recognized by Ace Elliott of the Dayton Daily News, noting that Detwiler could write with his legs. According to the Springfield News-Sun, he played with his farm toys with his legs. He also attended West Liberty-Salem High School, graduating in 1988.

Detwiler created his YouTube channel on March 3, 2016, uploading his first video Welcome to the Farm on November 1, 2018. He thought of receiving money while making YouTube videos, for which his channel popularity while his channel was receiving views on YouTube. On September 17, 2022, he posted his last video New Tires For The Oliver 1600.

== Personal life and death ==
In 1996, Detwiler married Corkey Wallace. Their marriage lasted until his death in 2022.

In 2020, Detwiler announced that he had been diagnosed with esophageal cancer. He then was afflicted with pneumonia and suffered an aneurysm. He died from an aneurysm on September 21, 2022, in Urbana, Ohio, at the age of 52.
