= Julie Hart Beers =

American painter (1835–1913)

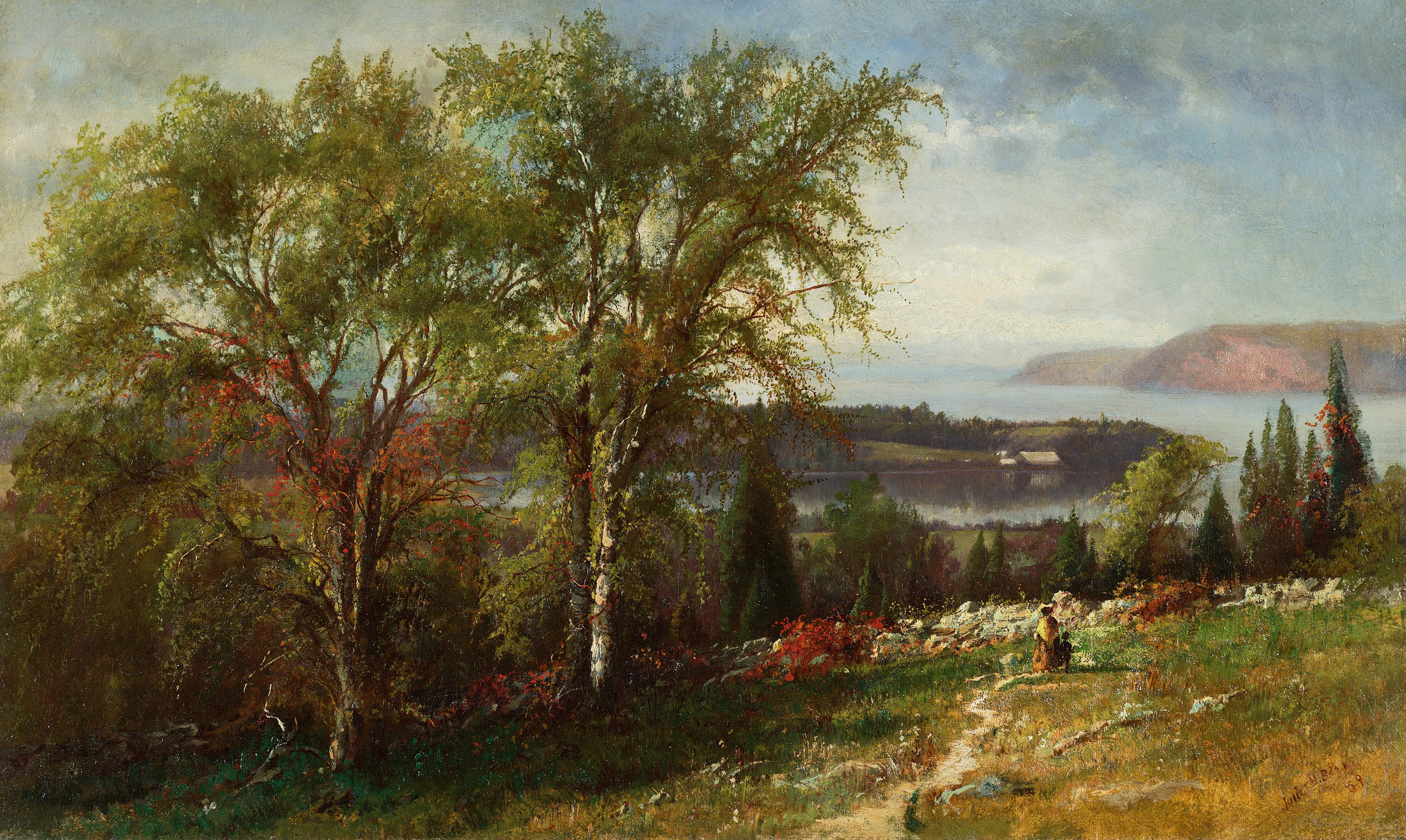
Julie Hart Beers, Hudson River at Croton Point, 1869.

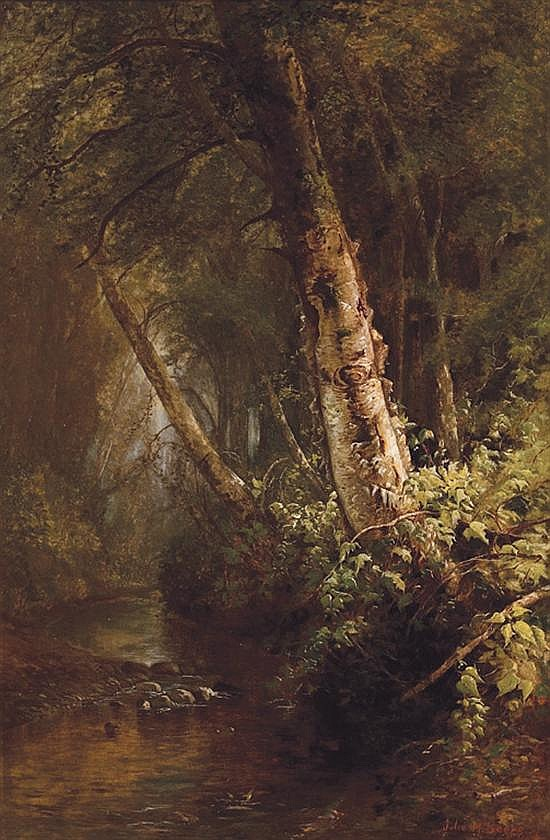
Julie Hart Beers, Forest Interior, 1876.

Julie Hart Beers Kempson (1835 – August 13, 1913) was an American landscape painter associated with the Hudson River School and the White Mountain School of Art who was one of the very few commercially successful professional women landscape painters of her day.

== Life ==
Born Julie Hart in Pittsfield, Massachusetts, she was the daughter of James Hart and Marion (Robertson) Hart, who had immigrated from Scotland in 1831. Her older brothers William Hart and James McDougal Hart were also important landscape painters of the Hudson River School, and her nieces Letitia Bonnet Hart and Mary Theresa Hart became well-known painters as well. Another niece, Annie L. Y. Orff, became an editor and publisher.

In 1853, she married journalist George Washington Beers, an editor at the Albany Evening Journal newspaper. After his death in 1856, she and her two daughters moved to New York City, where her brothers had their studios. Like most women artists of the day, she had no formal art education, but it is thought that she was trained by her brothers.

Well into her forties, with her second husband, Peter Kempson, she moved to Metuchen, New Jersey, where she set up her own studio. She continued to use the surname Beers when signing her artwork, although a second source says she painted and exhibited as Julie Kempson following this second marriage.

At the time of her death she was living in Trenton.

== Career ==
By 1867, Beers was exhibiting her paintings, starting with the Brooklyn Art Association. Although she had her own studio in New Jersey, she continued to use William's studio on 10th Street in New York City as a showroom. She was one of very few women to become a professional landscape painter in the America of her day, in part because women were excluded from formal art education and exhibition opportunities.

Beers's mature style balances sweeping, well-balanced compositions with telling details. In the 1870s and 1880s, she exhibited frequently at the National Academy of Design as well as at the Brooklyn Art Association, the Boston Athenæum, and the Pennsylvania Academy of Fine Arts. She was able to sell a good deal of work through the Brooklyn Art Association, but she also took groups of women on sketching trips to the mountains of New York and New England to supplement her income.

Beers painted two unusual round landscape oil paintings, a Hudson River view and a forest interior, on composition boards that had the shape of china plates. China plate painting, popular in the 19th century, was a past-time of women, while typically it was male artists who painted landscapes. These works blended art and craft, masculinity and femininity.

She also painted some still lifes.
