= Letitia Bonnet Hart =

American painter

- Born: 1867; New York
- Died: 1953 (aged 85–86); Eau Gallie, Florida
- Known for: Painting

Letitia Bonnet Hart (1867–1953) was an American painter known for her portrait and figure painting.

== Biography ==
Hart was born in 1867 in New York. She was the eldest of three children of the Hudson River School painter James McDougal Hart and the artist Mary Theresa Gorsuch Hart (d. 1921), who was best known for Easter Morning, a widely reproduced image of a white marble cross draped in flowers. James Hart's siblings included the artists William Hart and Julie Hart Beers. Letitia's sister, Mary Theresa Hart (1872-1942), was also a painter. Letitia Hart studied with her father, at the Brooklyn Academy of Design and National Academy of Design in New York City, and with Edgar Melville Ward. (Her brother Robert Gorsuch Hart, a water-plant engineer, died while working in Mexico in 1906, at age 37.) The family lived at 94 First Place in Brooklyn and had a country home in Lakeville, Connecticut.

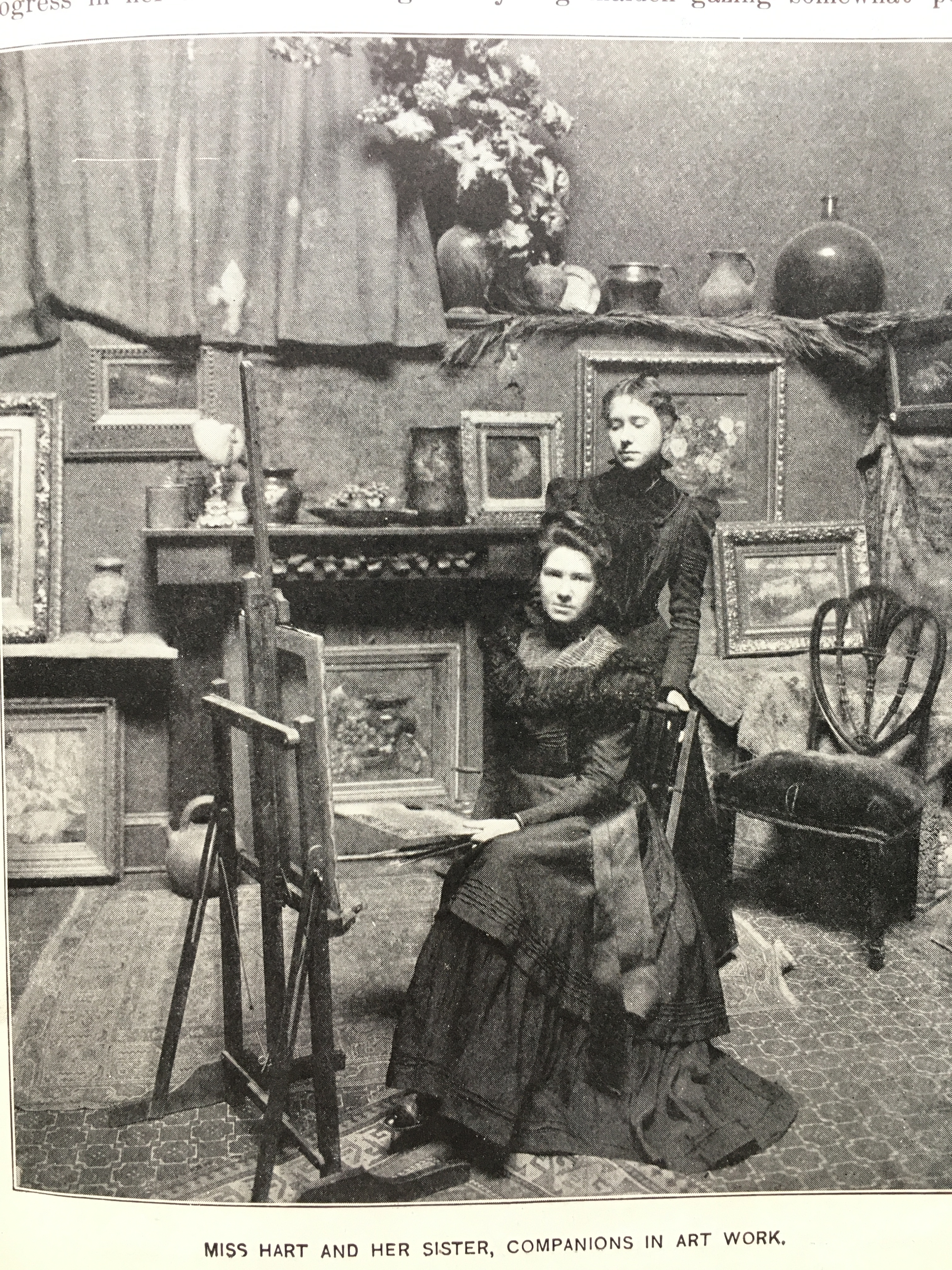
Letitia Hart (seated) with her sister Mary Theresa Hart in their studio at 11 East 14th Street, from Metropolitan Magazine's Feb. 1899 issue.

Starting around 1885, Letitia Hart exhibited her work at venues including the American Water Color Society, Art Club of Philadelphia, Brooklyn Art Association, James Gill's gallery in Springfield, Mass., Louisiana Purchase Exposition, National Academy of Design (she received the Norman W. Dodge $300 prize there in 1898 for best painting by a woman), Pan-American Exposition, Union League Club of Brooklyn, and the Woman's Building at the 1893 World's Columbian Exposition in Chicago, Illinois. With her sister (who often posed for portraits) and father, she commuted from Brooklyn to a top-floor studio at 11 East 14th Street in Manhattan. She and her sister were praised for "the truthfulness and delicacy of their portraits."

Around 1892 Letitia Hart traveled in South America. After her sister's death she moved to Florida. Hart died in 1953 in Eau Gallie, Florida, and is buried with her family in Green-Wood Cemetery. Paintings by her are in the cemetery's collection and at the Huntsville Museum of Art (Summer Portrait). Correspondence from her survives at the Archives of American Art (Charles M. Kurtz papers, Carnegie Institute records).
