= Urbana Monument Square Historic District =

Historic district in Ohio, United States

- U.S. National Register of Historic Places
- U.S. Historic district
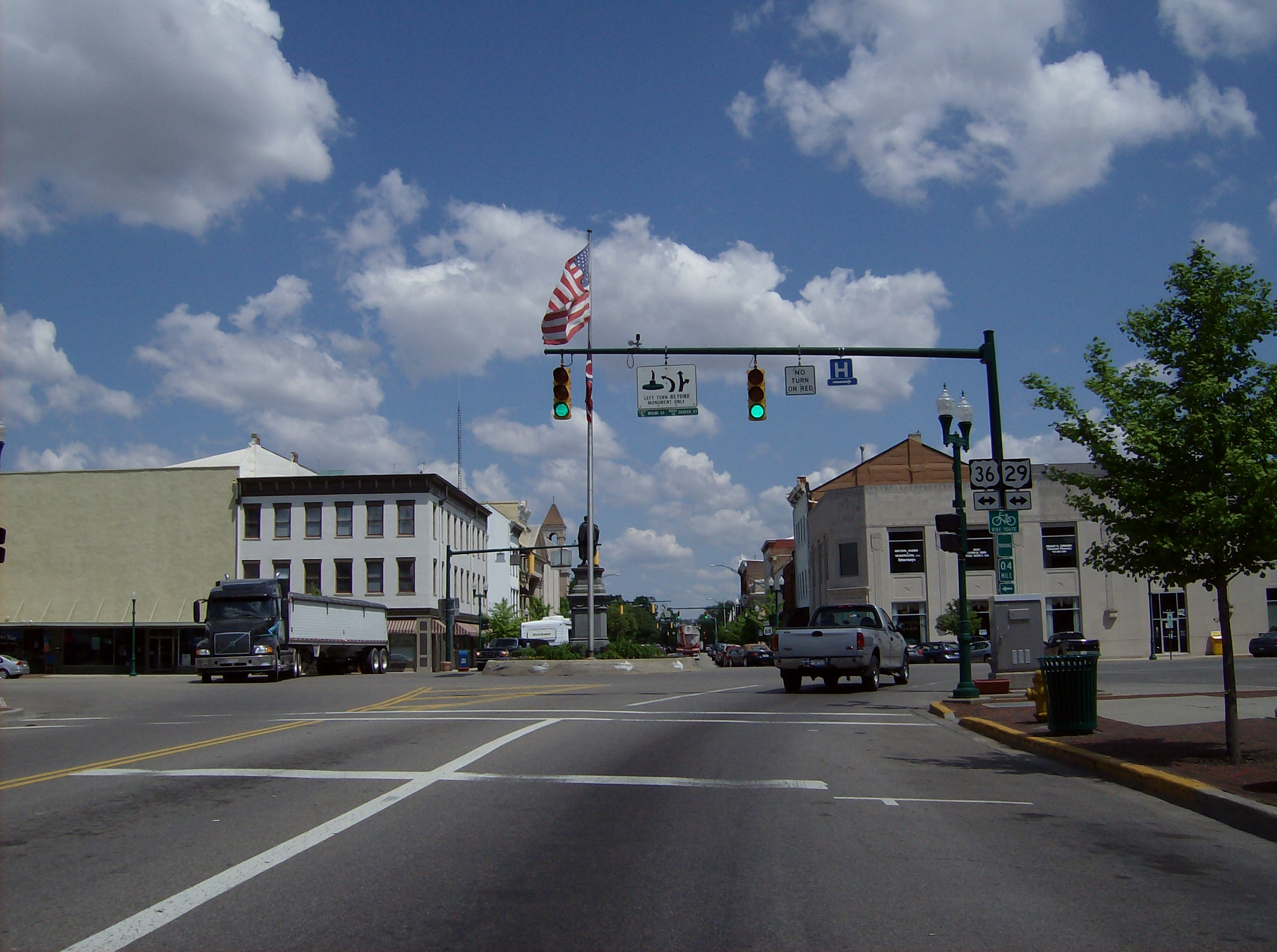
- Center of the district

- Location within Ohio Location within the United States

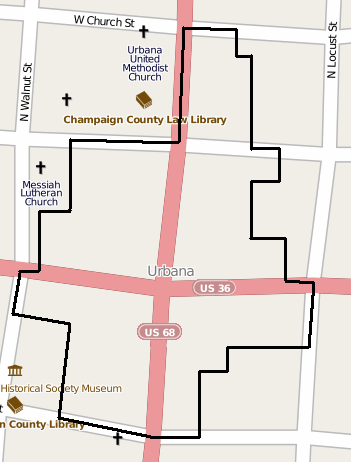
- Map of the district
- Location: Roughly bounded by Market, Walnut, Church, and Locust Sts., Urbana, Ohio
- Coordinates: 40°6′29″N 83°45′9″W
- Area: 25 acres (10 ha)
- Built: 1805
- Architectural style: Late Victorian, Federal
- NRHP reference No.: 84002909
- Added to NRHP: March 1, 1984

The Urbana Monument Square Historic District is a historic district at the center of Urbana, Ohio, United States. Since Urbana's earliest days, this portion of the city has been a public square in the heart of the city's business district. Among the buildings in the district are examples of the Federal, Georgian, Italianate, Richardsonian Romanesque, and Second Empire styles of architecture. In 1984, the district was listed on the National Register of Historic Places because of its architecture and its contribution to local history. Approximately 25 acres (10 ha) are included within the landmarked area, which is composed of 66 contributing properties, and which also includes 13 non-contributing properties.
