= G. F. Richings =

American author, lecturer (1852–1915)

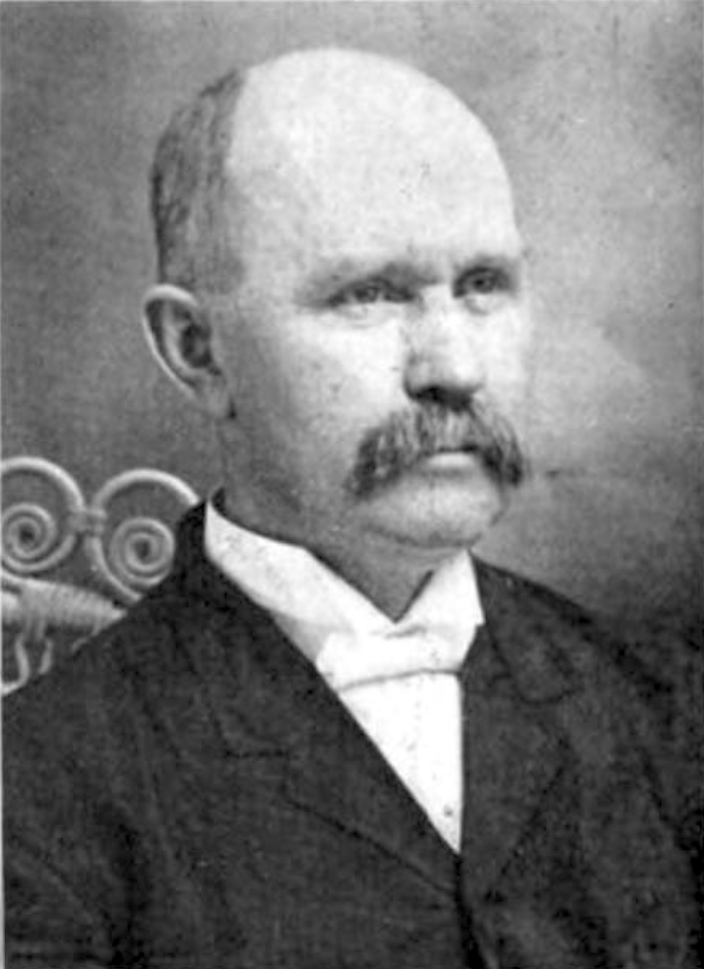
G. F. Richings, c. 1907

George F. Richings (1852 – 1915) more commonly known as G. F. Richings, was an American author and lecturer. He documented African American schools and educators, as well as other successful African Americans. He was white.

== History ==
His book describes him as the "Originator of Illustrated Lectures on Race Progress" George Parker helped organize a series of his presentations. Funds were donated to aid him in his work.

He gave lectures with photographs of schools and the people leading them. He used lantern slides. He corresponded with Booker T. Washington.

William Cowper Brann derided Riching's criticism of lynching Black men accused of rape and called for those who shared his views to be castrated.

He served as a traveling representative for Curry Normal and Industrial Institute in Urbana, Ohio. A Richings Memorial Hall was proposed at Curry Institute, to commemorate his work on behalf of the school.

== Writings ==
- An Album of Negro Educators (1900)
- Evidences of Progress Among Colored People, (1896, 1902) Philadelphia, PA: Geo. S. Ferguson Co., with an introduction by Benjamin W. Arnett

== See also ==
- Hallie Quinn Brown
