= Mary Theresa Hart =

American artist (1872–1942)

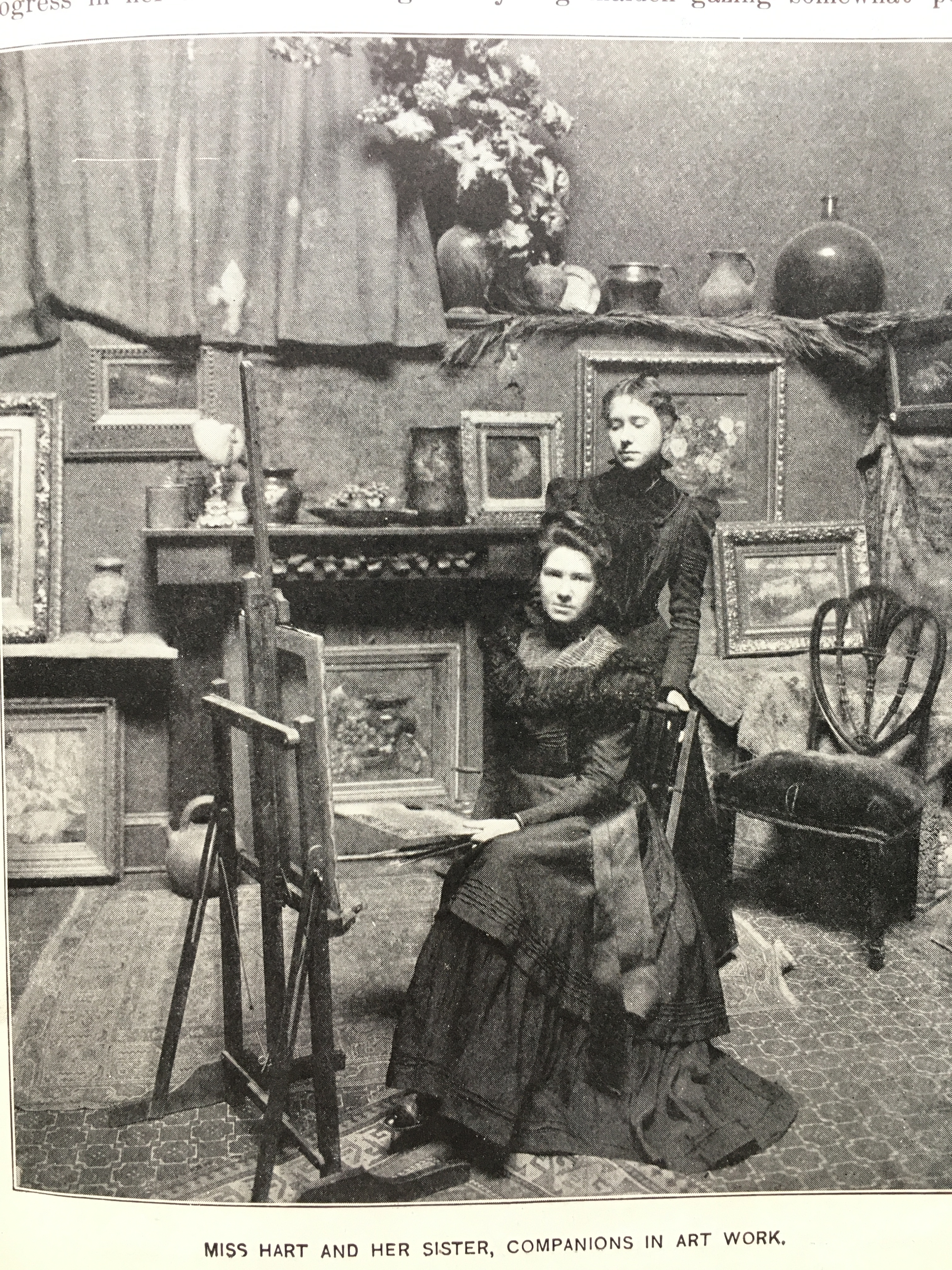
- Mary Theresa Hart, standing at right, with her sister Letitia B. Hart in their studio at 11 East 14th Street in Manhattan, published in February 1899 issue of Metropolitan Magazine
- Born: January 7, 1872; Brooklyn, New York
- Died: February 25, 1942 (aged 70); Brooklyn, New York
- Known for: Painting

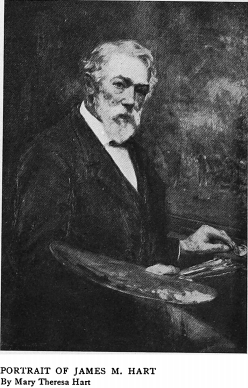
Mary Theresa Hart's circa-1900 portrait of her father James McDougal Hart

Mary Theresa Hart (January 7, 1872 – February 25, 1942) was an American artist and illustrator. She was known for portraits of sitters as prominent as her father, the Hudson River School painter James McDougal Hart and the writers William Austin Dickinson (Emily Dickinson's brother) and Zoe Anderson Norris; and for children's book and magazine illustrations. In the early 1900s she was considered "one of the best women artists" in New York.

== Biography ==
Hart was born in 1872 in New York, the third child and second daughter of James McDougal Hart and the artist Mary Theresa Gorsuch Hart (d. 1921), who was best known for Easter Morning, a widely reproduced image of a white marble cross draped in flowers. James M. Hart's siblings included the artists William Hart and Julie Hart Beers. Mary Theresa Hart's sister, Letitia Bonnet Hart (1867-1953), was also a painter. (Their brother Robert Gorsuch Hart, a water-plant engineer, died while working in Mexico in 1906, at age 37.) The family lived at 94 First Place in Brooklyn and had a country home in Lakeville, Connecticut.

Mary Theresa Hart studied at the National Academy of Design in New York and with Will Hicok Low and Edgar Melville Ward.

The two sisters and their father commuted daily from Brooklyn to adjoining top-floor studios at 11 East 14th Street in Manhattan. Mary Theresa Hart often sat for portraits by her sister, offering an "intelligent grasp of the poses," and the two women occasionally collaborated on canvases. A poem about the artist trio ended in the refrain, "don’t you wish that you were smart, Like James, Letitia and Mary Hart?"

Mary Theresa Hart died in 1942 at the family's Brooklyn row house. She is buried with her family in Green-Wood Cemetery.

== Exhibitions and publications ==
Mary Theresa Hart exhibited (often alongside her sister, uncle, and father) at venues including the American Water Color Society, Art Institute of Chicago, Louisiana Purchase Exposition, New York Water Color Club, Pan-American Exposition, and National Academy of Design--a portrait of the two sisters, painted by both of them, won the National Academy's Norman W. Dodge $300 prize for Mary Theresa Hart in 1901. Her writings and illustrations appeared in periodicals including The Designer and the Woman's Magazine, The Judge, Life, The Quarterly Illustrator, and Woman's Home Companion. In 1905 and 1906, she illustrated children's books, Wee Winkles and Wideawake and Wee Winkles and Snowball, both written by Gabrielle Jackson (and published by Harper & Brothers); the illustrations were praised by publications including Vogue, which described them as "drawn with sympathy and effect."

== Legacy ==
Institutions that own Hart's paintings include Green-Wood Cemetery (where Mary Theresa Hart designed the family's bronze gravestone plaque), Mead Art Museum at Amherst College (portrait of William Austin Dickinson, MAM712918, a gift from Mabel Loomis Todd's daughter Millicent Todd Bingham), National Academy of Design (portrait of James M. Hart, 543-P, a gift from Letitia B. Hart), and Yale University Art Gallery (portrait of a bearded man, 1969.43.8, a gift from Millicent Todd Bingham).
