= Curry Normal and Industrial Institute =

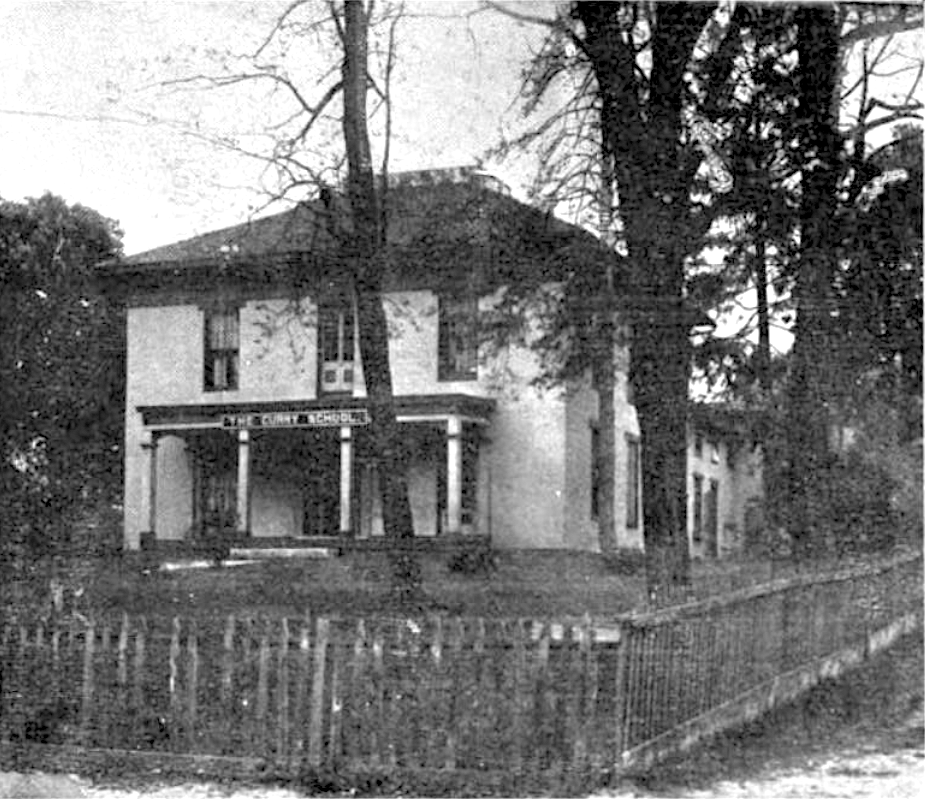
- The Curry School, main building, c. 1907
- Urbana, Ohio, U.S.

Information
- Other name: The Curry School
- Founded: 1889
- Founder: Elmer Washington Bryant Curry (E. W. B. Curry)
- Principal: Elmer Washington Bryant Curry

Curry Normal and Industrial Institute was a school for African American students in Urbana, Ohio, United States. It was founded by E. W. B. Curry in 1889 for the training of African-American youth and he served as its president. It was also known as The Curry School.

== History ==
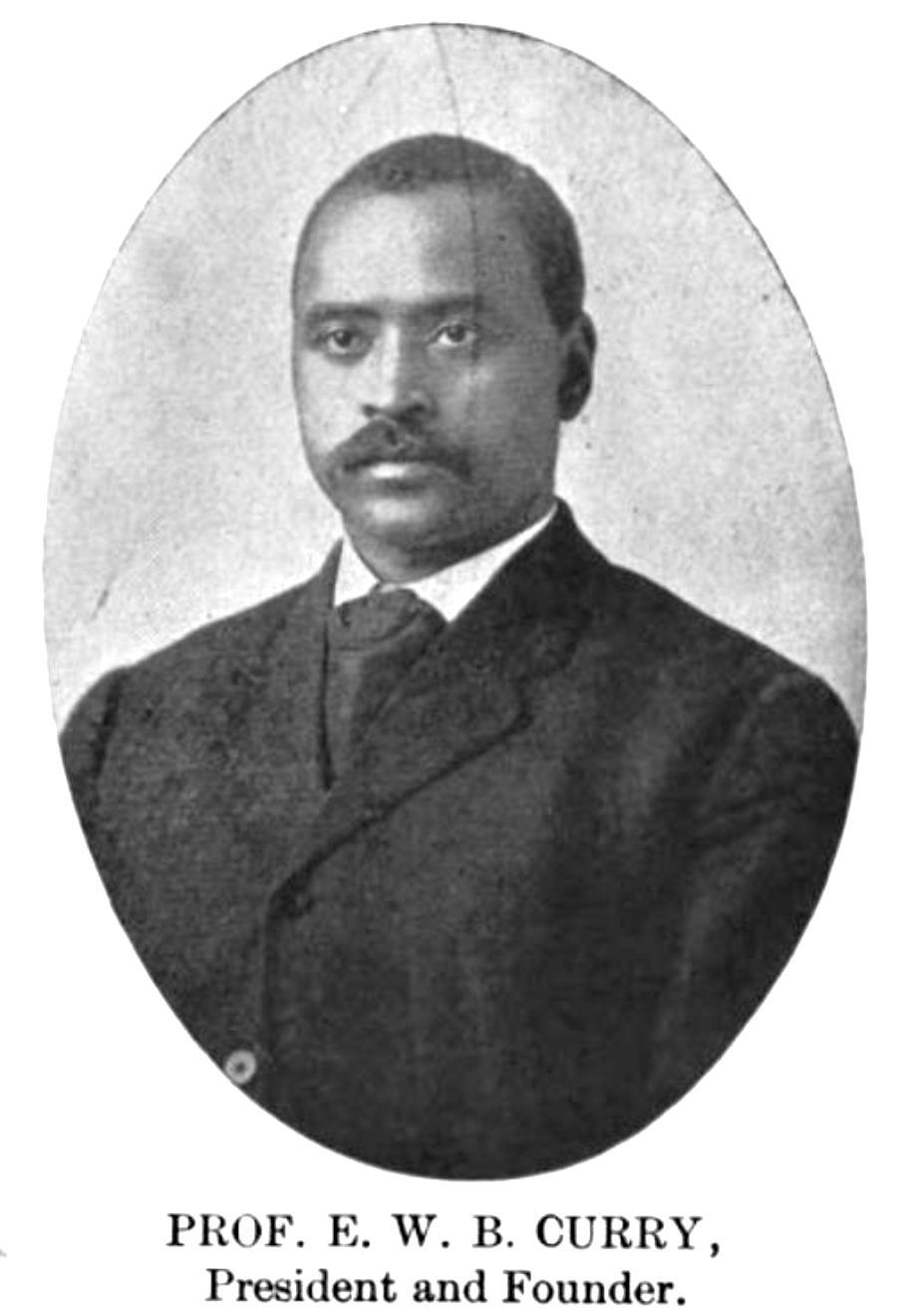
Elmer Washington Bryant Curry (E. W. B. Curry), c. 1907

The Curry Normal and Industrial Institute was founded by E. W. B. Curry (also known as Elmer Washington Bryant Curry; 1871–1930), who served as the first president of the institute, and served for more than twenty years. The school curriculum included a Bible school and normal, literary, commercial, music, and industrial departments.

In 1913, the institute received a gift of $2,000 from Martha Fouse, a former slave. Judge E. E. Cheney and Ed. Hagenbuch served as school officials. George W. B. Conrad and George W. Hayes served as trustees.

G. F. Richings served as a traveling representative for the school and he included in E. W. B. Curry's book on the school's history A Story of the Curry Institute, Urbana Ohio, Told by the Founder E. W. B. Curry on page 12.
