= Anthony Creek =

Stream in West Virginia, U.S.

Coordinates: 37°53′30″N 80°19′34″W

Anthony Creek is a 15 mile-long (24 km) tributary of the Greenbrier River in the southeastern West Virginia, flowing through Greenbrier County before joining the Greenbrier at the town of Anthony. The creek drains a watershed of approximately 34 square miles (90 km²) and is noted for its excellent trout fishery and recreational paddling opportunities.

According to tradition, the Anthony Creek has the name of John Anthony, a local Indian.

== See also ==
- List of rivers of West Virginia
