= Urbana, Ohio =

- City
- City of Urbana
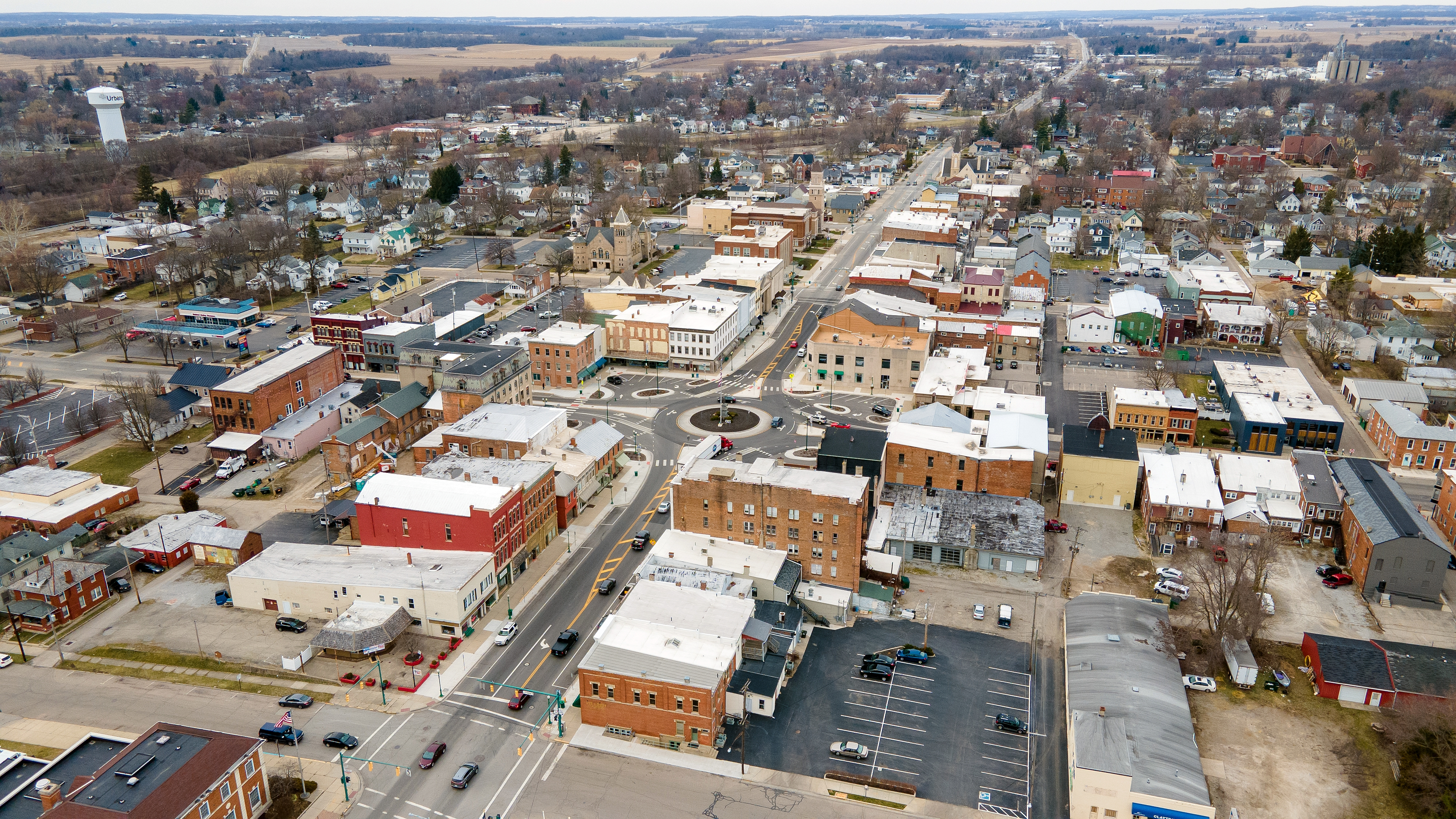
- Downtown Urbana

- Logo
- Interactive map of Urbana, Ohio
- Location within Ohio Location within the United States
- Coordinates: 40°07′12″N 83°44′50″W
- Country: United States
- State: Ohio
- County: Champaign
- Townships: Urbana, Salem

Government
  - Mayor: Bill Bean

Area
  - Total: 7.91 sq mi (20.49 km^{2})
  - Land: 7.91 sq mi (20.49 km^{2})
  - Water: 0 sq mi (0.00 km^{2})
- Elevation: 1,043 ft (318 m)

Population (2020)
  - Total: 11,115
  - Density: 1,405.2/sq mi (542.54/km^{2})
- Time zone: UTC-5 (Eastern (EST))
  - Summer (DST): UTC-4 (EDT)
- ZIP code: 43078
- Area codes: 937, 326
- FIPS code: 39-79072
- GNIS feature ID: 2397096
- Website: urbanaohio.com

Urbana is a city in Champaign County, Ohio, United States, and its county seat. It is located about 34 miles (55 km) northeast of Dayton and 41 miles (66 km) west of Columbus. The population was 11,115 at the 2020 census. It is the principal city of the Urbana micropolitan area. Urbana was laid out in 1805, and for a time in 1812 was the headquarters of the Northwestern army during the War of 1812. It is the burial place of the explorer and soldier Simon Kenton. The city was home to Urbana University and Curry Normal and Industrial Institute, a school for African American students.

== History ==
Champaign County was formed on February 20, 1805, following the American Revolution and the Northwest Indian War. Colonel William Ward, a Virginian who had settled in the Mad River Valley with Simon Kenton in 1799, purchased 160 acres which he considered the logical and most acceptable site for Champaign's county seat. He approached the county commissioners with a proposition to locate the seat of the new county on this tract. Ward suggested that site to divided into 212 lots and 22 out-lots, half of which, selected alternately, were to be given to the county and while Ward would retain the remainder. Ward also offered two lots for a cemetery and a tract for the public square. The county commissioners approved the proposal, and Ward, with Joseph C. Vance, entered into a written agreement on October 11, 1805. Ward and Vance named the new county seat, Urbana.

The origin of the name 'Urbana' is unclear; however, it is thought that Ward and Vance used the Latin word 'urbs', which means city. Antrim provides the following theory: "It is said by some that Mr. Ward named the town from the word Urbanity, but I think it is quite likely he named it from an old Roman custom of dividing their people into different classes – one class, the Plebeians, and this again divided into two classes – Plebs Rustica and Plebs Urbana. The Plebs Rustica lived in the rural districts and were farmers, while the Plebs Urbana lived in villages and were mechanics and artisans." Others feel that Ward and Vance chose to name it from a town in Virginia, possibly Urbanna, but this seems unlikely. Urbanna means 'City of Anne' and was named for the English queen. It is more likely that two Revolutionary War veterans would turn to Latin rather than honor their former foe. A review in 1939 shows that of the 12 cities in the United States named "Urbana", the city in Ohio was the first.

When Ward delegated Vance to survey the site, there were no platted towns between Detroit and Springfield to use as a model. Nevertheless, Vance and Ward planned Urbana systematically. They provided for an ample public square, and laid the streets in an orderly pattern with no deviations for bogs and swamps.

By 1833, Urbana contained a courthouse and jail, one printing office, a church, a market house, nine mercantile stores, and 120 houses.

On June 4, 1897, residents of Urbana formed a lynch mob and fought their way into the town jail to remove Charles Mitchell, a black man who was suspect in the killing of a white. Crowds of men had been forming for more than a day. The mob hanged Mitchell in the courtyard of the courthouse in the middle of the night. Trying to protect him, Sheriff McCain had summoned the state militia, led by Captain Leonard. After the mob fired into the jail, the militia returned at least five shots, killing Harry Bell, one of the white mob, and wounding others. When the lynch mob gained entry after 2:30 am, the sheriff withdrew militia forces to an upper floor in retreat.

On June 21, 2009, a skatepark was added to Urbana's Melvin Miller Park. In November 2013, Damian Prendergast, who was a local skateboarder, died from germ cell cancer. Following his death, his high school class raised $700 and support to dedicate the skatepark in Damian's name.

== Geography ==
The city has a total area of 7.77 square miles (20.12 km^{2}), of which 7.75 square miles (20.07 km^{2}) is land and 0.02 square miles (0.05 km^{2}) is water.

== Demographics ==
Historical population
Census	Pop.	Note	%±
1820	644		—
1830	1,102		71.1%
1840	1,070		−2.9%
1850	2,020		88.8%
1860	3,429		69.8%
1870	4,276		24.7%
1880	6,252		46.2%
1890	6,510		4.1%
1900	6,808		4.6%
1910	7,739		13.7%
1920	7,621		−1.5%
1930	7,742		1.6%
1940	8,335		7.7%
1950	9,335		12.0%
1960	10,461		12.1%
1970	11,237		7.4%
1980	10,774		−4.1%
1990	11,353		5.4%
2000	11,613		2.3%
2010	11,793		1.5%
2020	11,115		−5.7%
2025 (est.)	11,140		0.2%

=== 2020 census ===
As of the 2020 census, Urbana had a population of 11,115. The median age was 41.4 years. 21.8% of residents were under the age of 18 and 20.6% of residents were 65 years of age or older. For every 100 females there were 91.2 males, and for every 100 females age 18 and over there were 88.3 males age 18 and over.

99.4% of residents lived in urban areas, while 0.6% lived in rural areas.

There were 4,947 households in Urbana, of which 25.6% had children under the age of 18 living in them. Of all households, 36.4% were married-couple households, 21.0% were households with a male householder and no spouse or partner present, and 33.4% were households with a female householder and no spouse or partner present. About 36.8% of all households were made up of individuals and 16.8% had someone living alone who was 65 years of age or older.

There were 5,472 housing units, of which 9.6% were vacant. The homeowner vacancy rate was 2.2% and the rental vacancy rate was 6.6%.

Racial composition as of the 2020 census
Race	Number	Percent
White	9,721	87.5%
Black or African American	468	4.2%
American Indian and Alaska Native	37	0.3%
Asian	50	0.4%
Native Hawaiian and Other Pacific Islander	5	0.0%
Some other race	92	0.8%
Two or more races	742	6.7%
Hispanic or Latino (of any race)	255	2.3%

=== 2010 census ===
As of the census of 2010, there were 11,793 people, 4,808 households, and 2,932 families living in the city. The population density was 1,521.7 inhabitants per square mile (587.5/km^{2}). There were 5,401 housing units at an average density of 696.9 per square mile (269.1/km^{2}). The racial makeup of the city was 89.7% White, 5.4% African American, 0.4% Native American, 0.7% Asian, 0.7% from other races, and 3.1% from two or more races. Hispanic or Latino of any race were 2.0% of the population.

There were 4,808 households, of which 31.0% had children under the age of 18 living with them, 41.3% were married couples living together, 14.4% had a female householder with no husband present, 5.2% had a male householder with no wife present, and 39.0% were non-families. 33.0% of all households were made up of individuals, and 14.4% had someone living alone who was 65 years of age or older. The average household size was 2.34 and the average family size was 2.95.

The median age in the city was 38.2 years. 23.7% of residents were under the age of 18; 11.4% were between the ages of 18 and 24; 23.1% were from 25 to 44; 25.3% were from 45 to 64; and 16.4% were 65 years of age or older. The gender makeup of the city was 47.1% male and 52.9% female.

=== 2000 census ===
As of the census of 2000, there were 11,613 people, 4,859 households, and 2,998 families living in the city. The population density was 1,702.3 inhabitants per square mile (657.3/km^{2}). There were 5,210 housing units at an average density of 763.7 per square mile (294.9/km^{2}). The racial makeup of the city was 91.03% White, 5.95% African American, 0.34% Native American, 0.30% Asian, 0.03% Pacific Islander, 0.48% from other races, and 1.88% from two or more races. Hispanic or Latino of any race were 1.08% of the population.

There were 4,859 households, out of which 29.0% had children under the age of 18 living with them, 46.2% were married couples living together, 11.8% had a female householder with no husband present, and 38.3% were non-families. 33.4% of all households were made up of individuals, and 13.1% had someone living alone who was 65 years of age or older. The average household size was 2.29 and the average family size was 2.92.

In the city the population was spread out, with 23.7% under the age of 18, 9.8% from 18 to 24, 27.9% from 25 to 44, 22.4% from 45 to 64, and 16.2% who were 65 years of age or older. The median age was 37 years. For every 100 females, there were 87.2 males. For every 100 females age 18 and over, there were 83.6 males.

The median income for a household in the city was $33,702, and the median income for a family was $42,857. Males had a median income of $33,092 versus $26,817 for females. The per capita income for the city was $17,831. About 7.2% of families and 10.9% of the population were below the poverty line, including 16.3% of those under age 18 and 7.6% of those age 65 or over.

== Economy ==
Champaign County Farmers Market in Urbana

Several companies have facilities in Urbana, including Rittal, Honeywell Aerospace, Honeywell Inc., Control Industries, Freshwater Farms, Bolder & Co Creative Studio. A variety of services are located in buildings around the Urbana Monument Square Historic District, which is listed on the National Register of Historic Places. Businesses in the square include banks, accounting, fine dining, bars, and personal care. The Champaign County Farmers Market is held weekly in downtown Urbana. In a contest sponsored by the American Farmland Trust, the market was voted as one of America's four favorite farmers' markets. Urbana is also home to the annual Simon Kenton Chili Cook-Off that takes place downtown in the monument square.

== Education ==
Almost all of Urbana is within the Urbana City School District, which includes Urbana High School (9–12) and a pre-k through 8 building. Both the high school and pre-k–8 were finished in 2018, after receiving grants for new school buildings. The original castle building from the high school still stands, but is no longer used. The new high school is on Washington Ave. and the elementary and middle school is south of Urbana on US 68.

A small piece of the city to the north is in the West Liberty-Salem Local School District.

The city was home to Urbana University from 1850 until 2020. It offered liberal arts tertiary-education opportunities in a small college environment. Serving about 1500 students, it offered 28 undergraduate majors in a variety of disciplines; graduate degrees in Business Administration, Criminal Justice, Education and Nursing; and opportunities for international students desiring to study in the United States.

Urbana has a public library, a branch of the Champaign County Public Library.

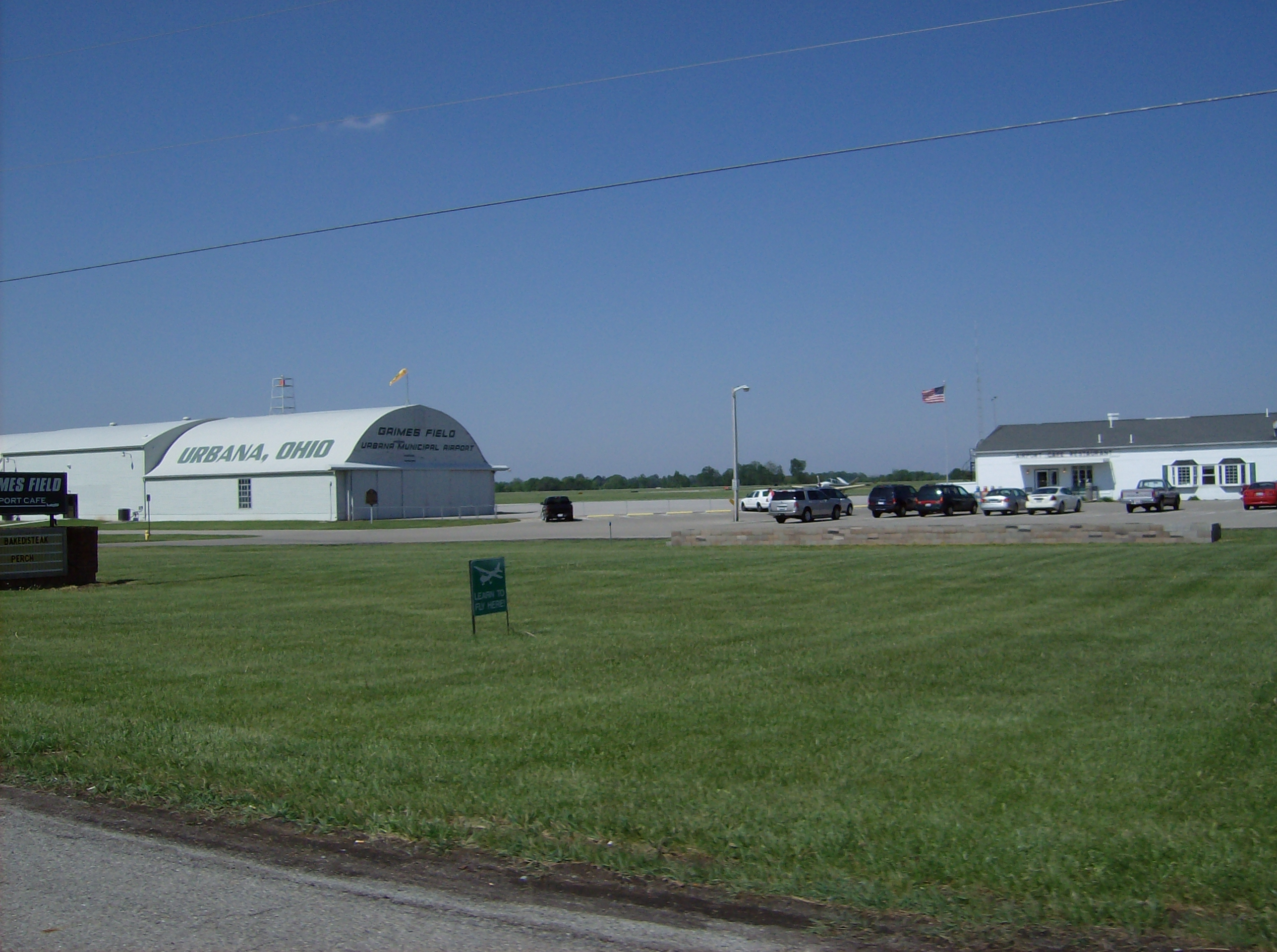
Grimes Field, the Urbana airport

== Infrastructure ==
- Urbana was a stop along the Pittsburgh, Cincinnati, Chicago and St. Louis Railroad, which connected Pittsburgh to Chicago and St. Louis.
- Urbana was also served by the Erie’s Dayton branch connecting with the main line at Marion.
- Urbana's municipal airport, Grimes Field, is home to the Champaign Aviation Museum. A museum known for its restoration of a Boeing B-17 Flying Fortress and other historic aircraft.

== Notable people ==
- James B. Armstrong – businessman and Civil War officer
- Clancy Brown – born in Urbana in 1959, producer and actor, son of Congressman Bud Brown (below).
- Clarence J. "Bud" Brown Jr., US Representative (1965 to 1983), former publisher of the Urbana Daily Citizen
- Call Cobbs Jr. (1911–1971), jazz pianist and organist
- Moses Bledso Corwin – attorney and member of United States House of Representatives
- Andy Detwiler – farmer
- Elias Franklin Drake – politician and businessman, born in Urbana
- Pete Dye – golf course architect voted into the Hall of Fame; grew up in Urbana
- Robert Morton Duncan – lawyer and jurist
- Robert L. Eichelberger – United States Army general in the South West Pacific Area during World War II
- Graham Fach – professional ten-pin bowler on the PBA Tour (born in Canada, bowled for Urbana University and now resides in Urbana)
- Brian Gassaway (1972–2021), mixed martial artist
- Warren G. Grimes (1898–1975) – "Father of the Aircraft Lighting Industry"
- Charles T. Hinde – businessman and riverboat captain
- Edmund C. Hinde – miner during the California Gold Rush
- Robert R. Hitt – United States Assistant Secretary of State, born in Urbana in 1834
- Raymond Hubbell – composer of musicals, including the song "Poor Butterfly"
- John Hough James (1800-1881) – lawyer, banker, politician, newspaper publisher, settled in Urbana in 1825
- Jim Jordan – Representative for Ohio's 4th district
- Michael Kent – comedian and magician
- Simon Kenton – frontiersman; buried in Urbana
- Tony Locke – Arena Football League wide receiver
- Beth Macy – journalist and non-fiction writer; grew up in Urbana
- Matt Rife - comedian, born in Urbana
- Joseph Vance – 13th Governor of Ohio; lived in Urbana
- Martin R. M. Wallace – Civil War general, born in Urbana
- W. H. L. Wallace – Civil War general, born in Urbana
- Colonel William Ward – founder of Urbana
- John Quincy Adams Ward – sculptor of the George Washington statue in New York City
- Edgar Melville Ward – painter and educator
- Brand Whitlock – born and raised in Urbana; four-time mayor of Toledo, Ohio

== See also ==
- Curry Normal and Industrial Institute
