= Fort Dinwiddie =

Coordinates: 38.08125°N 79.844787°W

Fort Dinwiddie (1755–1789) was a base for the Virginia Militia during the French and Indian War and Revolutionary War. It was located on the Jackson River, five miles west of Warm Springs, Virginia, in present-day Bath County.

== History ==
The fort was first built in 1755 around the house of William Warwick during the French and Indian War. It was named for the lieutenant governor of colonial Virginia, Robert Dinwiddie. Initially the fort was under the command of Captain Andrew Lewis who was relieved by Captain Peter Hog on September 21, 1755. Colonel George Washington inspected the fort on September 24, 1755.

The fort was garrisoned by 60 to 100 men in 1756. The fort featured a log-covered passageway that ran from a corner blockhouse to a spring within the fort.

The stockaded structure became one of a chain of forts, 15 to 30 miles apart, established in the mid-1700s to guard the Virginia frontier against the Native Americans of the Ohio River Valley. George Washington, then a colonel and in charge of the Virginia Militia’s fort project, wrote to Captain Hog of the Virginia Regiment, July 21, 1756: "As the Assembly has voted a chain of Forts to be built on the Frontiers, the Governor has ordered out the militia of Augusta to assist you in erecting them ... to the Southward of Fort Dinwiddie, extending the Line towards Mayo River as directed by the Assembly." Captain Hog was to make use of his own company of men and of the militia he might raise, "except about 30 private wh. you are to leave under the command of Lt. Bullett, at Fort Dinwiddie. . ."

George Washington visited the fort again in October 1756, while the fort was under the temporary command of Lieutenant Bullet.

The fort was used primarily as a muster point but was laid siege upon by a group of Delaware and Shawnee for six hours in mid-June 1764.

The fort was abandoned in 1789. The site was confirmed by a team of archaeologists from the Virginia State Library in April 1971.

Fort Dinwiddie was also known as Warwick's Fort, Hogg's Fort and Byrd's Fort.

A historical marker for the fort stands at the intersection of Hwy 39 and Dinwiddie Trail in Bath County, Virginia.
