= Thomas Bigelow Craig =

American painter (1849–1924)

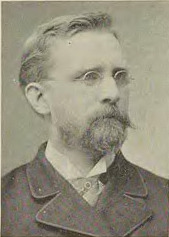
- Born: 1849; Philadelphia
- Died: 1924 (aged 74–75)
- Education: Self-taught, Pennsylvania Academy of Fine Arts
- Known for: Landscape painter

Thomas Bigelow Craig (1849–1924) was an American landscape painter from Philadelphia, Pennsylvania. He is known for his paintings depicting cows (and occasionally sheep) in summer environments. Craig's landscapes often featured meadows and streams. The animals in his earlier paintings did not take up a large part of the canvas compared to the surrounding landscapes; in his later paintings, however, the animals were drawn larger and became more important than the landscapes around them.

== Career ==
Craig lived in Philadelphia until he was forty. He studied at the Pennsylvania Academy of Fine Arts, but taught himself how to paint. Some of Craig's work was on display at the school in 1869 and from 1876 to 1891. The paintings were also exhibited at the New York National Academy of Design in 1879 and 1881, and between 1884 and 1924. Craig gained a membership at the National Academy of Design in 1887 and moved to New York City in 1899. He lived there for ten years, after which he moved to Rutherford, New Jersey. Between 1875 and 1900, Craig's paintings were being exhibited in places such as the Cincinnati Industrial Exposition, the Brooklyn Art Association, and the Brooklyn Art Club.

Craig's paintings have also been displayed at the Butler Institute of American Art, the Los Angeles County Museum of Art, the Newark Museum, the Washington County Museum of Fine Arts, the Mobile Museum of Art, and the World's Columbian Exhibition in Chicago. According to Michael D. Zellman, author of the American Art Analog, Craig "made a fairly good living from his work." He died in 1924 in Woodland, New York.
