= Edgar Melville Ward =

American painter (1839–1915)

Edgar Melville Ward (1839–1915) was an American genre painter.

Ward was born in Urbana, Ohio. His elder brother was the sculptor, John Quincy Adams Ward. He studied at the National Academy of Design in New York City and in Paris under Cabanel. In 1883 he became a member of the Institut de France and was made a professor there. His paintings which are soundly realistic in execution, include Breton Washwomen (Au lavoir. - Souvenir du Finistère, 1876 salon de Paris) and The Sabot Maker (Le sabotier, 1876 salon de Paris); The Collar Shop and The Quilting Party (1892); and The Coppersmith (Metropolitan Museum, New York).

His atelier in Paris was located on n° 13, impasse Sainte-Elisabeth in the 14e arrondissement. The street was renamed rue Boissonade in 1875/1876. The house n° 13, rue Boissonade changed into n° 36 in 1935.

== Gallery ==
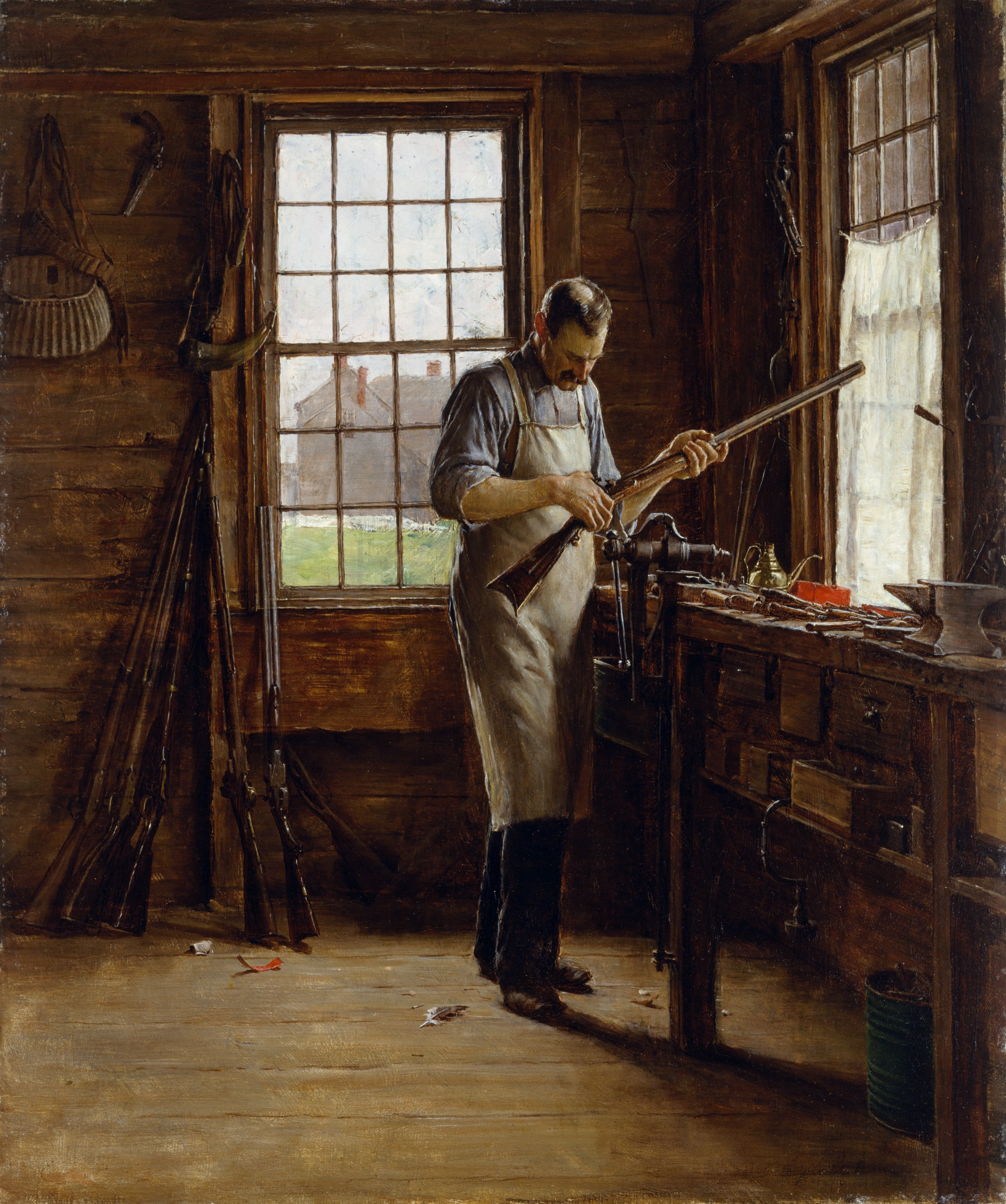
The Gunsmith Shop

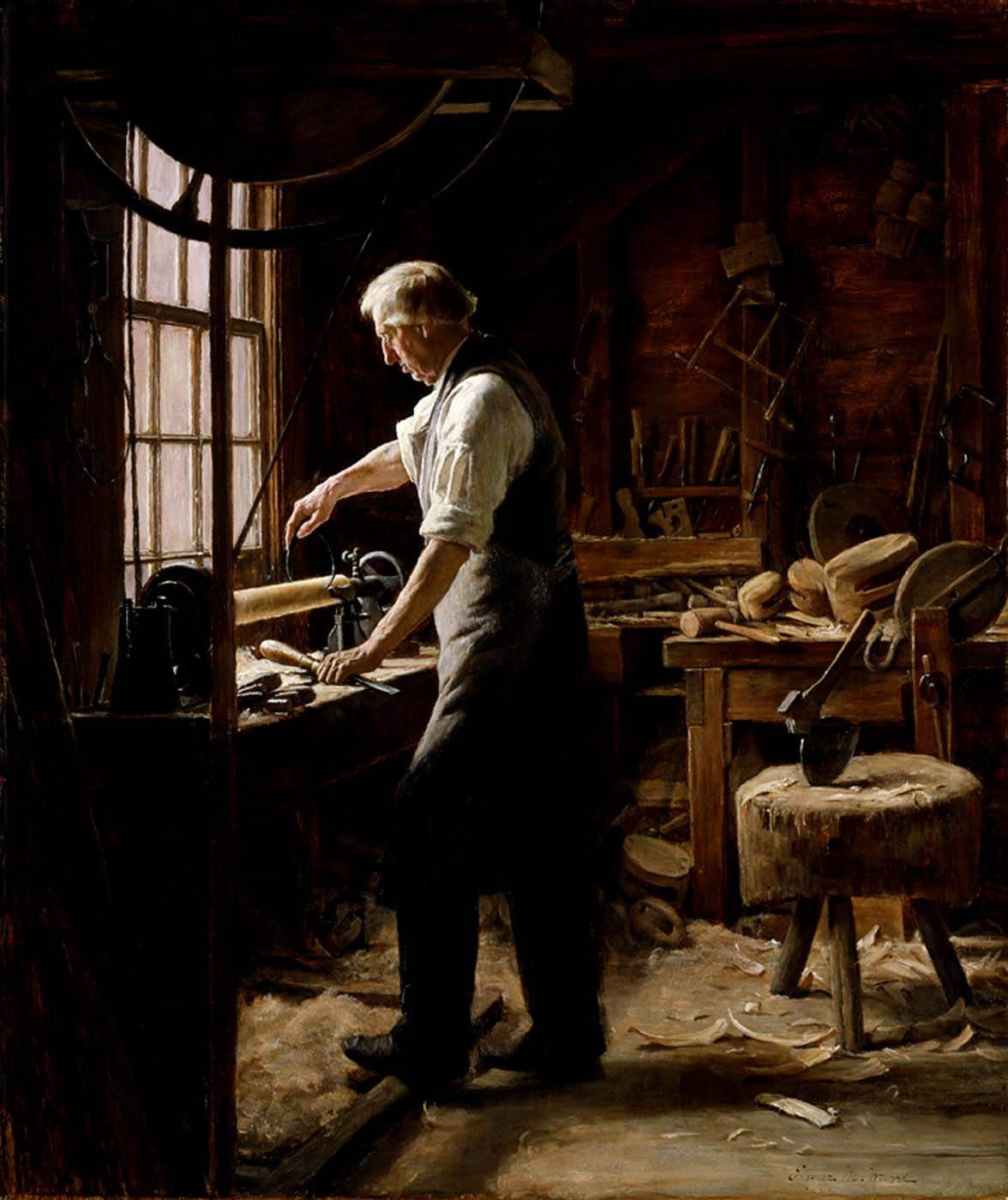
The Blockmaker

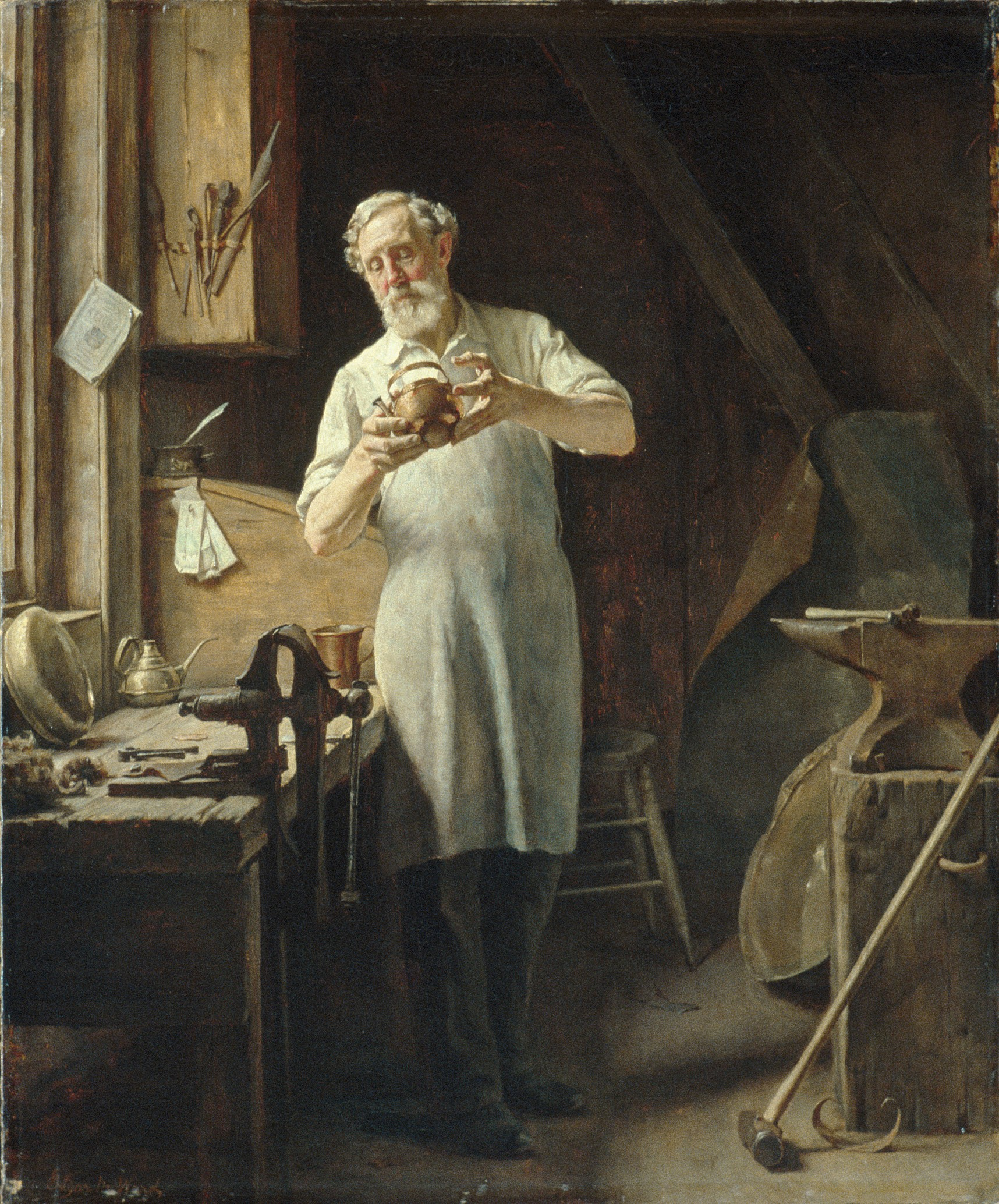
The Coppersmith
