= Champaign Lady =

Aircraft converted to museum exhibit

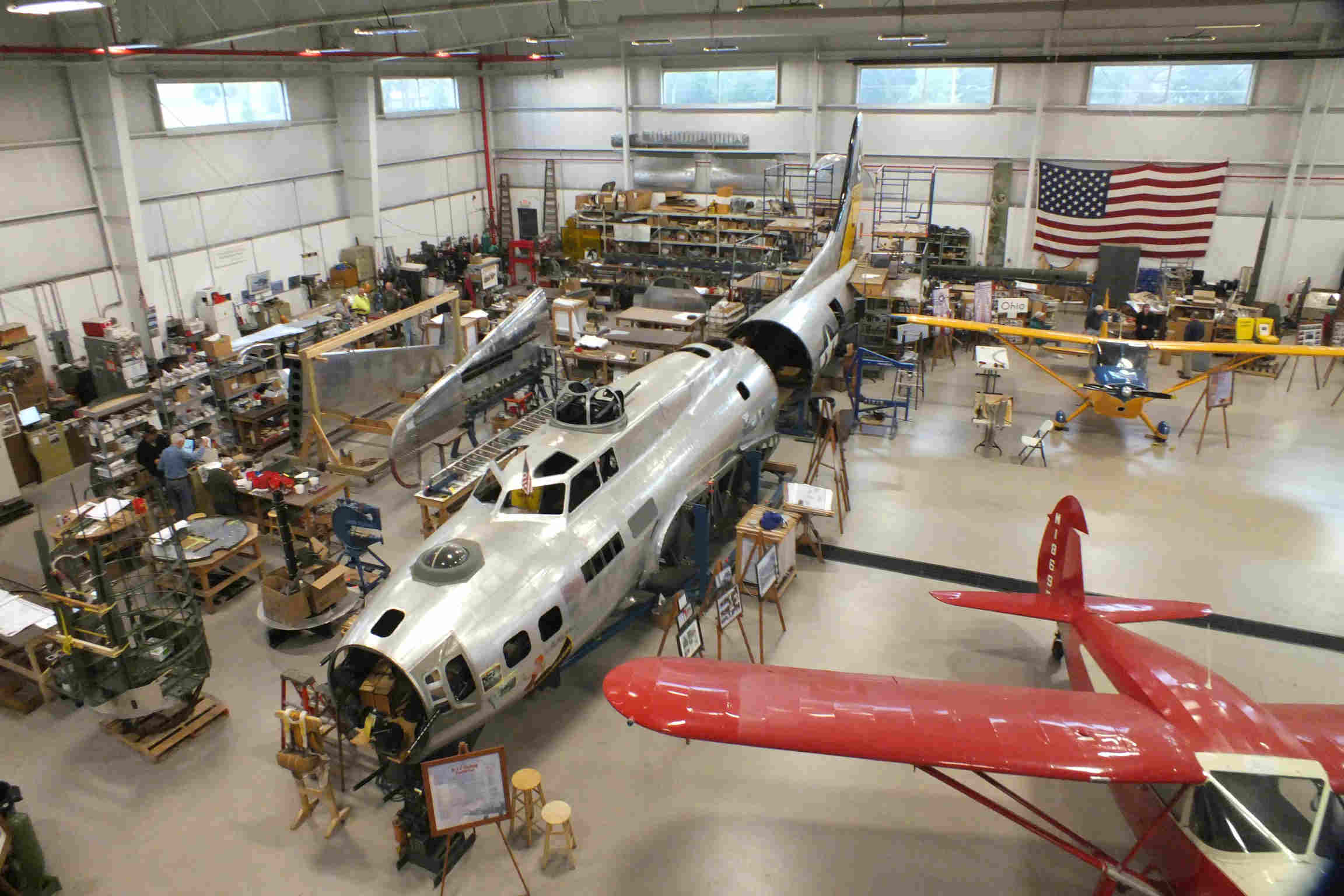
- Champaign Lady in 2015

General information
- Type: B-17G Flying Fortress
- Manufacturer: Boeing
- Owners: USAAF / USAF
- Construction number: 8722
- Registration: N3154S
- Serial: 44-85813

History
- In service: 1945–1957
- Preserved at: Champaign Aviation Museum
- Fate: Crashed, currently under restoration to flying condition

Champaign Lady is the name of a Boeing B-17G Flying Fortress that was delivered to the U.S. military near the end of World War II and did not see combat action. The plane is currently undergoing restoration at Grimes Field in Urbana, Ohio, by the Champaign Aviation Museum.

== History ==
The aircraft was delivered to the United States Army Air Forces (USAAF) in May 1945 as a B-17G with serial number 44-85813. It was leased to Curtiss-Wright and modified as a JB-17G engine testbed. The airframe was used to test the XT-35 Typhoon turboprop, and the Wright J65 jet engine among others.

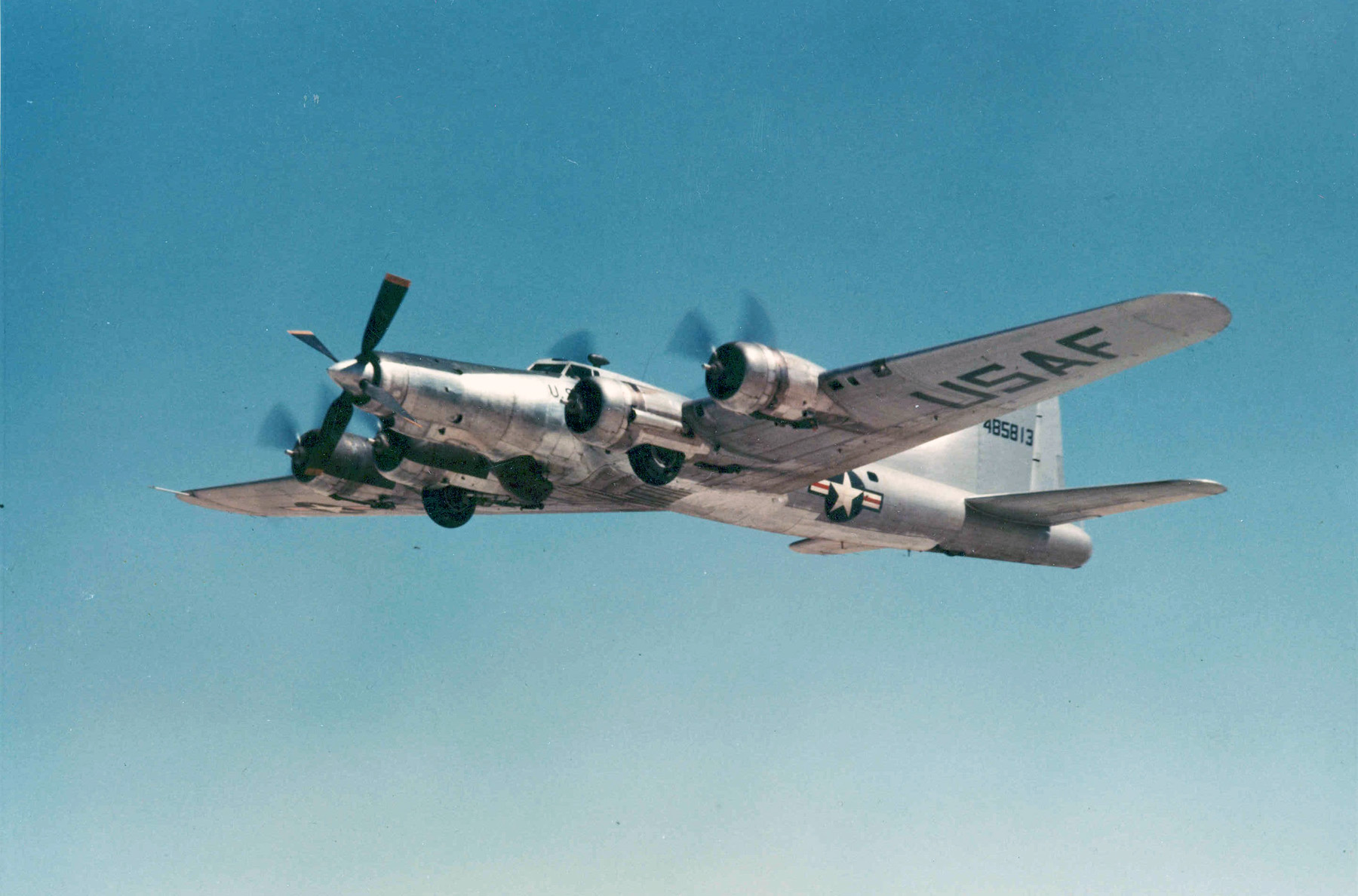
The aircraft in 1956 in use as an engine testbed

The Ewing Aviation Company acquired the aircraft in 1966 and owned it until 1969 when it was owned by Ewing-Kolb Aircraft until 1970. Black Hills Aviation, owned by Arnold Kolb, then purchased the aircraft.

In the late 1960s, the forward engine mount was removed and the aircraft was converted into an aerial firefighter in Spearfish, South Dakota. It was used as a firefighter until April 1980, when it crashed in Brunswick County, North Carolina, while taking off from a Forest Service airstrip; both crew members on the plane avoided injury. Elements from the aircraft were used to restore another B-17, Liberty Belle.

In 2005, the remainder of the aircraft was bought by the Champaign Aviation Museum. In conjunction with parts from several other airframes, restoration to flying condition began. In 2011, the museum recovered parts from Talkeetna, Alaska, to aid in the restoration. As of 2013, nearly 90 volunteers had spent seven years restoring the B-17 at the museum and repaired around 70% of the fuselage. As of February 2022, restoration efforts were still ongoing on major components.
