= Champaign Aviation Museum =

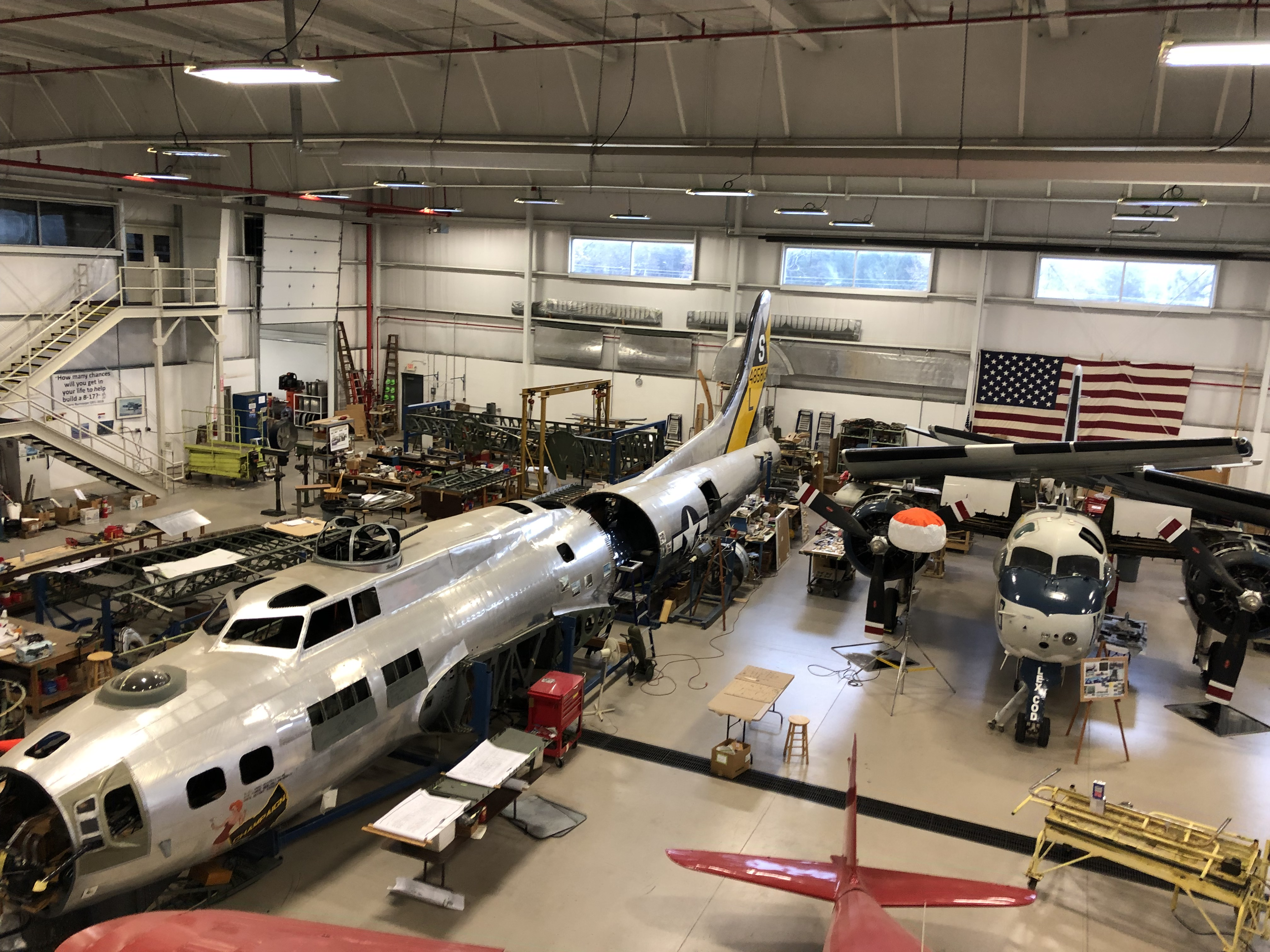
- B-17 Flying Fortress undergoing restoration
- Established: 2005
- Location: Grimes Field, Urbana, Ohio, United States
- Coordinates: 40.134643°N 83.748957°W
- Type: Aviation museum
- Executive director: Dave Shiffer
- Deputy director: Jessica Henry
- Website: champaignaviationmuseum.org

The Champaign Aviation Museum is a non-profit World War II aviation museum in Urbana, Ohio. It is situated on the north end of Grimes Field municipal airport, roughly a mile from central Urbana. The museum is known primarily for its ongoing restoration of the Champaign Lady, a B-17 Flying Fortress, to flying condition. The museum is the only organization in the state of Ohio to provide living history flight experiences to paying passengers in its North American B-25 Mitchell, Champaign Gal. It is also a component of the National Aviation Heritage Area, a federally designated heritage area primarily centered around sites pertaining to the Wright brothers.

== History ==
The museum began with the purchase of the wreckage of a JB-17G/model 299Z, a B-17 engine testbed variant with a fifth engine mounted on the nose, and several other parts sourced from various B-17s. The parts and pieces arrived at Grimes Field in November 2005. Restoration work started on the aircraft by volunteers at the south end of the airport soon after. The museum was established as a 501(c)(3) non-profit organization in 2008, the same year a North American B-25 Mitchell was purchased. The next year the museum purchased a C-47 and a former waterbomber A-26. Work continued on the B-17 at the south end until 2010 when a purpose built hangar was completed and the B-17 project as well as the newly acquired aircraft were moved into it. In August 2011, the museum recovered the remains, primarily the empennage, of a B-17G wreckage from Talkeetna, Alaska for use in the restoration. In November 2018, a Grumman C-1 Trader in flying condition was donated to the museum. Then a month later, in October, ground was broken on a project adjacent to the hangar to expand the museum by 20,000 sq ft (1,900 m^{2}). In 2019 the restoration workshop was completed. A second 20,400 sq ft (1,900 m^{2}) hangar was opened on 25 October 2025.

== Aircraft ==
The museum's collection consists of primarily vintage military aircraft, but also includes several civilian aircraft.

Aircraft	Status	Serial number	Registration/markings	Notes
Boeing B-17	Under restoration	44-85813	N3154S	Named Champaign Lady
Culver LFA	Flying condition	247	N34864	
Douglas A-26	Static	44-35948	N381EC	Former aerial firefighter for Air Spray Ltd.
Douglas C-47 Skytrain	Static	25720	N105CA	
Fairchild 24W-9	Flying condition	W213	N18695	Formerly owned by Charles "Buddy" Rogers
Grumman C-1 Trader	Flying condition	136778	N778SR	Named Mudflap Girl
North American B-25 Mitchell	Flying condition	44-28866	N744CG	Named Champaign Gal
Stinson Voyager 10A	Flying condition	8094	N36794	Used by the Civil Air Patrol during WWII
Beechcraft Model 18	Static gate guardian	AF-276		
Schweizer TG-3A Glider	Static	42-52948		
De Havilland Vampire T.35	Disassembled/partially displayed	A79-633 RAAF	N35DS	Former Royal Australian Air Force training aircraft.

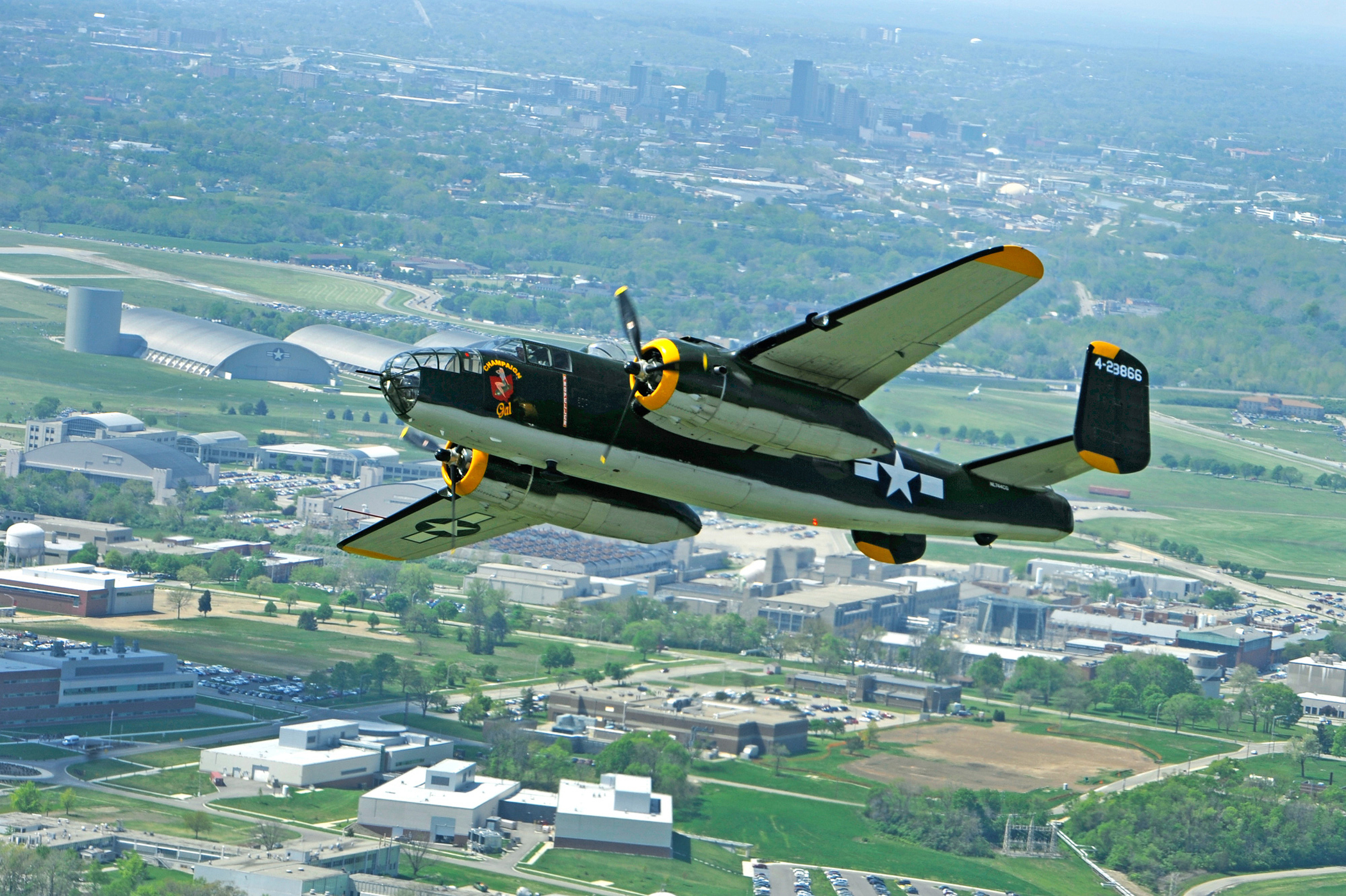
The museum's airworthy B-25 Champaign Gal

== Exhibits ==
In 2010 the museum began displaying an exhibit in their main hangar on Women Airforce Service Pilots (WASP) and how they helped with the war effort. In 2021 the museum received a grant from the National Aviation Heritage Area, and in 2022 from the Ohio History Connection to update their WASP exhibit with interactive kiosks and a video display.

In 2019 a 1941 Crosley convertible was donated to the museum and is on display in the museum's lobby.

In 2024 the museum updated their interpretation to focus on both the home front and the war front experiences of the 1940s in partnership with America 250-Ohio. Visitors are invited to choose their own path.

== See also ==
- List of aerospace museums
- National Museum of the United States Air Force
- Armstrong Air and Space Museum
