= National Aviation Heritage Area =

Federally designated National Heritage Area in the Dayton, Ohio area

Coordinates: 39°46′00″N 84°12′00″W

The National Aviation Heritage Area is a federally designated National Heritage Area consolidating more than fifteen aviation-related sites in the Dayton, Ohio, area into a cooperative marketing and administrative framework. The National Heritage Area is centered on the activities of the Wright brothers and their workshop at Dayton Aviation Heritage National Historical Park, itself composed of several sites.

Major features of the Heritage Area include the National Museum of the United States Air Force, Grimes Field, Champaign Aviation Museum and the Armstrong Air & Space Museum, as well as the Wright Cycle Company, Huffman Prairie Flying Field, Hawthorn Hill and Paul Laurence Dunbar State Memorial units of Dayton Aviation Heritage National Historical Park. Other cooperating organizations include the aviation archives of Wright State University, Woodland Cemetery and Arboretum, the Greene County Historical Society and local visitor centers.

The National Aviation Heritage Area was authorized in 2004 and is administered by the National Aviation Heritage Alliance.
