= AUZ =

AUZ may refer to:

- Australian Airlines, ICAO code
- Aurora Municipal Airport (Illinois), IATA code
- ISO 639-3 for Uzbeki Arabic
