= Douglas F5D Skylancer =

US carrier-based jet-powered fighter

F5D Skylancer
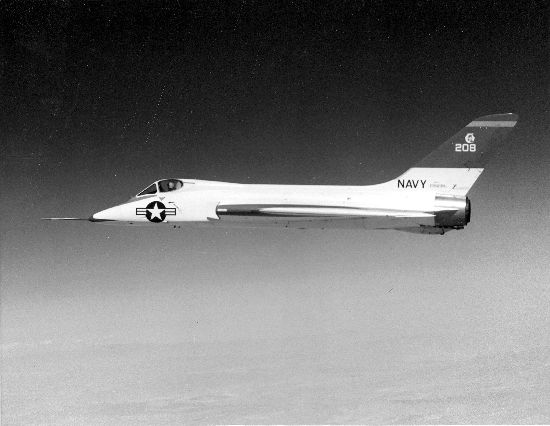
- Douglas F5D Skylancer prototype in use by NASA for Dyna-Soar abort training

General information
- Type: Fighter aircraft
- Manufacturer: Douglas Aircraft Company
- Primary user: United States Navy
- Number built: 4

History
- First flight: 21 April 1956
- Retired: 1970
- Developed from: Douglas F4D Skyray

The Douglas F5D Skylancer is a development of the F4D Skyray jet fighter for the United States Navy. Starting out as the F4D-2N, an all-weather version of the Skyray, the design was soon modified to take full advantage of the extra thrust of the Pratt & Whitney J57 eventually fitted to the Skyray instead of the Westinghouse J40 originally planned.

== Design and development ==
Soon the design became too different from the Skyray to be considered just a variation of it, and the aircraft was assigned a new designation as the F5D Skylancer. Almost every part of the airframe was modified, though the basic form remained the same as did the wing shape, though it became much thinner. The wing skinning was reinforced, correcting a problem found in the F4D. The fuselage was 8 ft (2.4 m) longer and area ruled to reduce transonic drag, being thinner in the region of the wing roots. Everything was shaped to reduce drag and increase stability at high speed.

Although the four 20 mm (.79 in) cannon in the wing roots were retained, primary armament was to be missiles or rockets; four AIM-9 Sidewinders or two AIM-7 Sparrows, and/or a battery of spin-stabilized unguided 2 in (51 mm) rockets.

Nine test airframes were ordered, with a 51-aircraft production order to follow. Production aircraft were to be powered by the more powerful J57-P-14 engine, while there was a rejected proposal to use the even more powerful General Electric J79 and variable-geometry inlets in a Mach 2 version.

== Operational history ==
The first flight was made by F5D-1 (Bu. No. 139208) on 21 April 1956 and was supersonic; the aircraft proved easy to handle and performed well. After four aircraft had been constructed, however, the Navy cancelled its order. The stated reason was that the aircraft was too similar to the already-ordered Vought F8U Crusader, but it is believed by some historians that politics played as big a part; Douglas was already building a very large proportion of the Navy's planes, and giving them the F5D contract would have made it even closer to monopoly. The project test pilot was Lt. Cmdr Alan B. Shepard Jr. whose report stated that it was not needed by the Navy. One F5D crashed during testing by the Navy.

=== NASA use ===
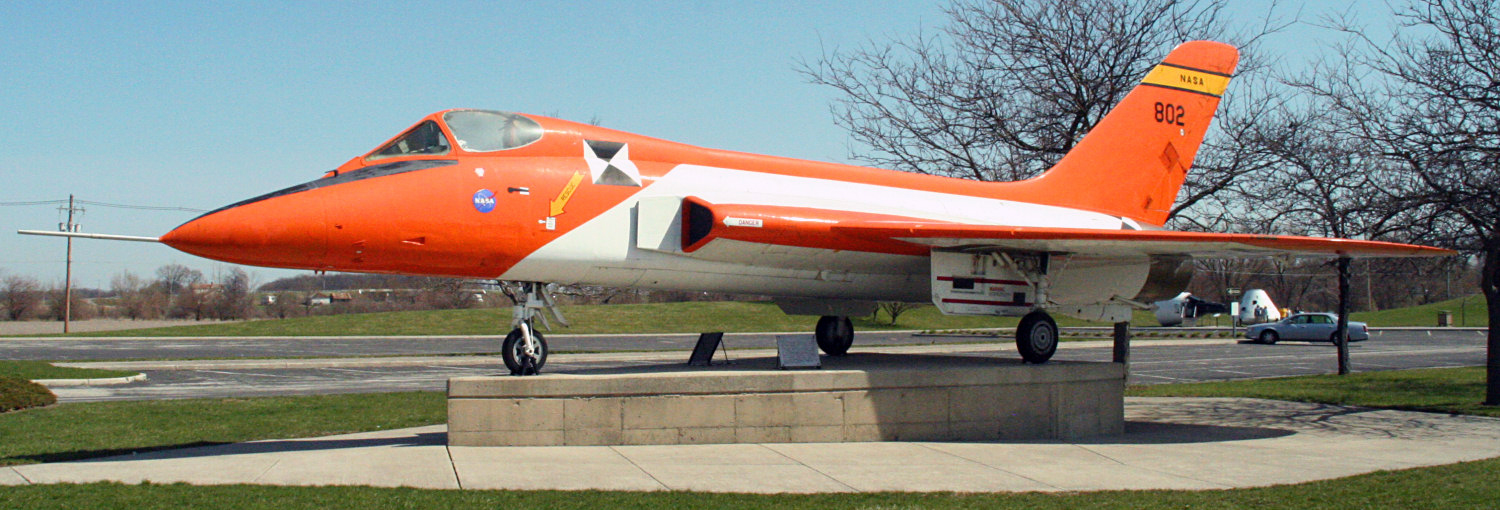
A Skylancer flown by Neil Armstrong for NASA, on display at the Armstrong Air and Space Museum

The four aircraft continued to fly in various military test programs. Two were grounded in 1961 (likely 139209 and 142349 which had been designated for spare parts in 1958), but the other two: F5D-1 (Bu. No. 139208) NASA 212, later becoming NASA 708 and F5D-1 (Bu. No. 142350) NASA 213, later becoming NASA 802 continued to fly. Transferred to NASA in the early 1960s, NASA 212 was used as a testbed for the American supersonic transport program, fitted with an ogival wing platform (the type eventually used on Concorde; data from the program was shared with the European designers), as well as being used as a vision field test platform for the X-20 Dyna-Soar. This aircraft was retired in 1968. NASA 802 was used for simulation of abort procedures for the X-20, because it had a very similar shape and handling characteristics. Following the DynaSoar cancellation, it was used as a chase plane and for various other programs until it was retired in 1970.

== Surviving aircraft ==
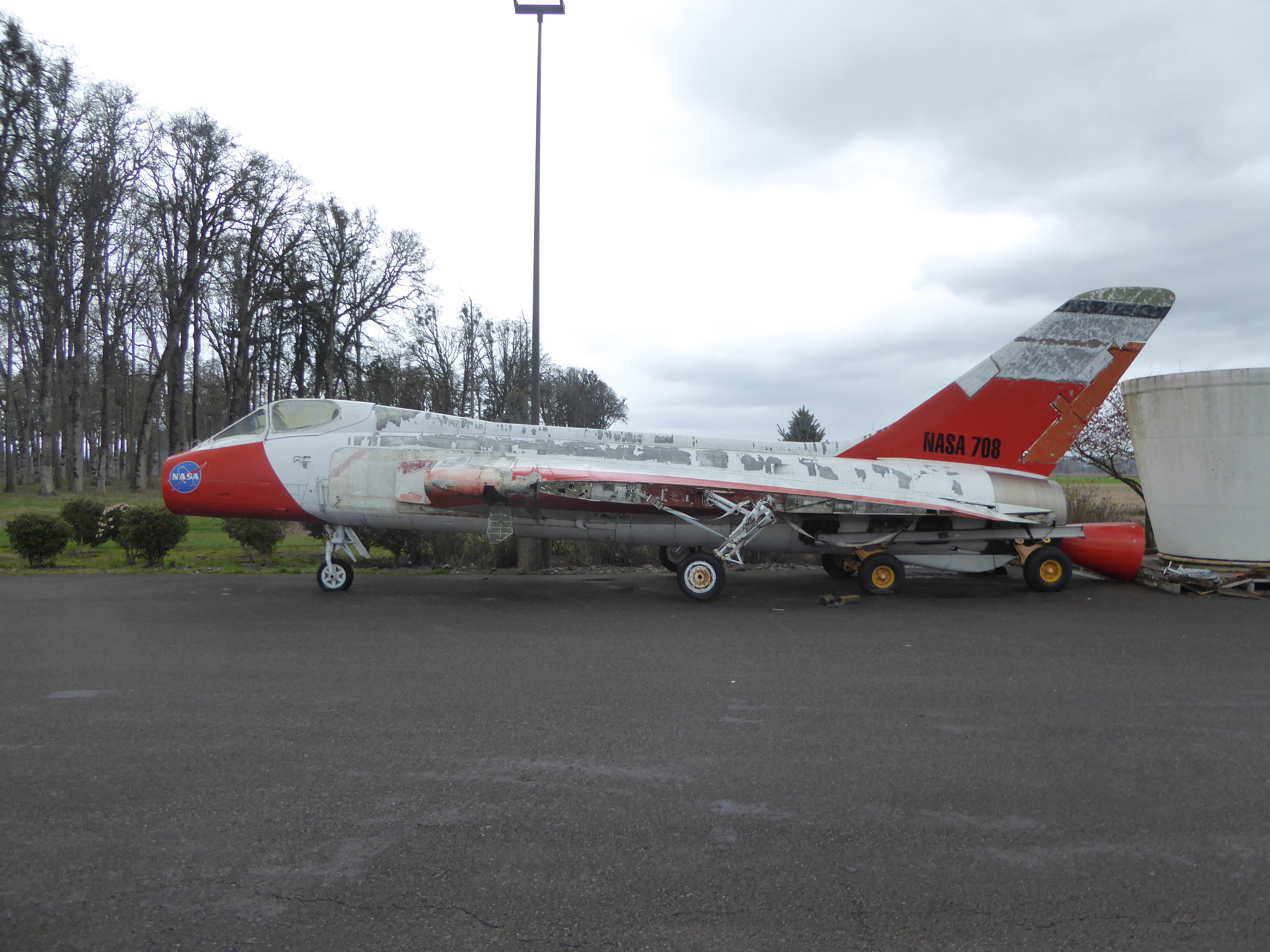
F5D-1 BuNo 139208 preserved outdoors at the Evergreen Aviation & Space Museum in 2021.

- BuNo 139208 (NASA 708) still in NASA markings was part of Merle Maine's private collection in Ontario, Oregon until 2014. The aircraft currently resides at Evergreen Aviation and Space Museum in McMinnville, Oregon.
- BuNo 142350 (NASA 802) is a part of the Ohio History Connection permanent collection. The aircraft sits on static display outside of the Armstrong Air & Space Museum in Wapakoneta, Ohio. Neil Armstrong flew the aircraft during the Dyna-Soar research program. This aircraft has returned to static display outside of the museum after undergoing an 8-month restoration in 2017 and 2018.

== Specifications (F5D-1) ==
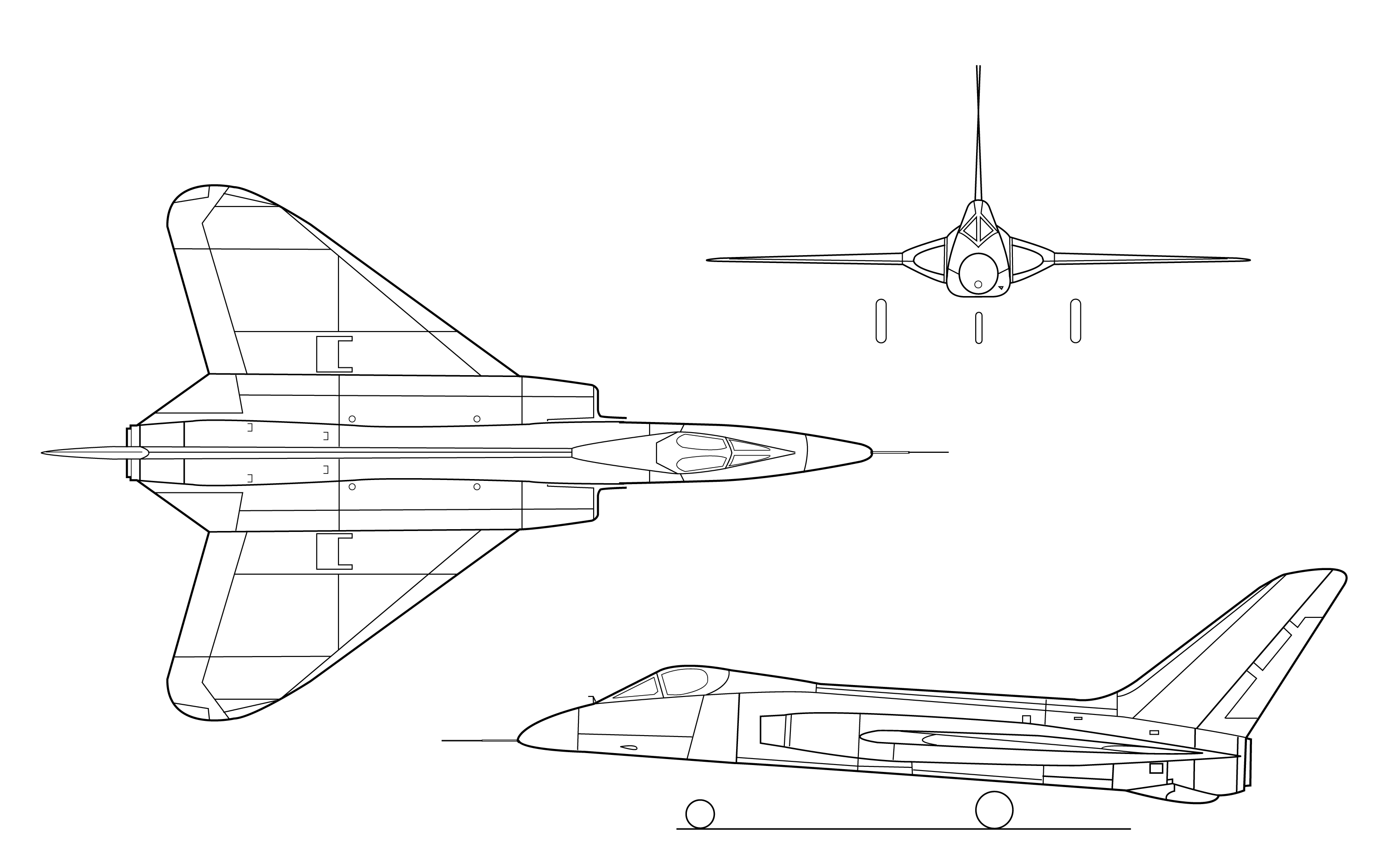

Data from Naval Fighters#35 : Douglas F5D-1 Skylancer, McDonnell Douglas aircraft since 1920 : Volume I, The American Fighter

General characteristics

- Crew: 1
- Length: 53 ft 9.75 in (16.4021 m)
- Wingspan: 33 ft 6 in (10.21 m) wings spread
- Width: 27 ft 6 in (8.38 m) wings folded
- Height: 14 ft 10 in (4.52 m)
- Wing area: 557 sq ft (51.7 m^{2})
- Empty weight: 17,444 lb (7,912 kg)
- Empty equipped: 18,147 lb (8,231 kg)
- Maximum landing weight: 21,320 lb (9,670 kg)
- Gross weight: 27,739 lb (12,582 kg) full internal fuel + 72 × 2 in (51 mm) rockets

28,739 lb (13,036 kg) with full internal fuel + 72 × 2 in (51 mm) rockets + 2 × AIM-7 Sparrow II AAMs

- Max takeoff weight: 31,204 lb (14,154 kg) with full internal fuel + 72 × 2 in (51 mm) rockets + 2 × AIM-7 Sparrow II AAMs + 2 × 150 US gal (120 imp gal; 570 L) drop-tanks
- Fuel capacity: 1,353 US gal (1,127 imp gal; 5,120 L) JP-5 in two fuselage tanks and four wing tanks; Usable fuel 1,333 US gal (1,110 imp gal; 5,050 L)
- Powerplant: 1 × Pratt & Whitney J57-P-8 afterburning turbojet engine, 10,200 lbf (45 kN) thrust dry, 16,000 lbf (71 kN) with afterburner

Performance

- Maximum speed: 686 kn (789 mph, 1,270 km/h) / M1.19 at 35,000 ft (11,000 m)

566 kn (651 mph; 1,048 km/h) / M0.99 at 44,000 ft (13,000 m)

- Maximum speed: Mach 1.48
- Cruise speed: 553 kn (636 mph, 1,024 km/h)
- Stall speed: 115.3 kn (132.7 mph, 213.5 km/h) power off

109.4 kn (125.9 mph; 202.6 km/h) approach power

- Combat range: 1,159 nmi (1,334 mi, 2,146 km)
- Service ceiling: 57,500 ft (17,500 m) (combat ceiling)
- Rate of climb: 20,820 ft/min (105.8 m/s)
- Wing loading: 43.9 lb/sq ft (214 kg/m^{2})
- Thrust/weight: 0.666

Armament

- Guns: 4 × 20 mm (0.79 in) autocannon
- Rockets: 72 × 2 in (51 mm) rockets
- Missiles:
  - 4 × AIM-9 Sidewinder or
  - 2 × AIM-7B Sparrow

Avionics

- Radar – AN/APQ-64
- UHF – AN/ARC-27
- Navigation Receiver – AN/ARN-21
- Radar Altimeter – AN/APN-22
- IFF – AN/APX-6B OR AN/APA-89
- Fire control – Aero X24A
- Armament Control Director – Aero 12A
- Sight – Aero 1A

== See also ==
Related development

- Douglas F4D Skyray

Aircraft of comparable role, configuration, and era

- Vought F8U Crusader

Related lists

- List of fighter aircraft
- List of United States Navy aircraft designations (pre-1962)
