= Warren G. Grimes =

Warren G. Grimes (1898–1975) was an entrepreneur and inventor from Urbana, Ohio. He founded Grimes Manufacturing Company and is known as the "Father of the Aircraft Lighting Industry".

== Career ==
Warren G. Grimes was born in rural Montgomery County in 1898 a few miles from where the Wright Brothers had lived and worked. During 1913, at the age of 15, Warren Grimes ran away from an orphanage in Tiffin, Ohio to live with his brother Frank in Detroit. He worked for Ford until he became a partner in an electrical small business operation that impressed Henry Ford. Ford approached Grimes in the mid-1920s and requested him to design a light for the Ford Tri-Motor Aircraft. Grimes designed and produced the lamp within 48 hours marking the beginning of his aviation entrepreneurial legacy.

In the 1930s, Grimes moved to Urbana, Ohio and started Grimes Manufacturing Company and purchased the Johnson farm, located on the northern side of Urbana where he built his residence and an airstrip which became Grimes Field Airport. Grimes invented the familiar red, green and white navigation lights found on the wing tips and tails of aircraft and other electrical fixtures for aircraft including landing, instrument and interior lights. By World War II, Grimes Manufacturing Company produced aircraft lighting for US military. It is noted that "every American-made airplane flown during World War II was equipped with Grimes lights." Grimes also served as mayor of Urbana, Ohio and chairman of the State of Ohio Aviation Board. Grimes Manufacturing Company is now owned by Honeywell and continues to design and manufacture lighting systems for the aerospace and transportation industries. For his contributions to aviation, Grimes was inducted into the National Aviation Hall of Fame in 2010.
