= Wright Cycle Company =

- Wright Cycle Company & Wright and Wright Printing Offices and Shop
- U.S. National Register of Historic Places
- U.S. National Historic Landmark
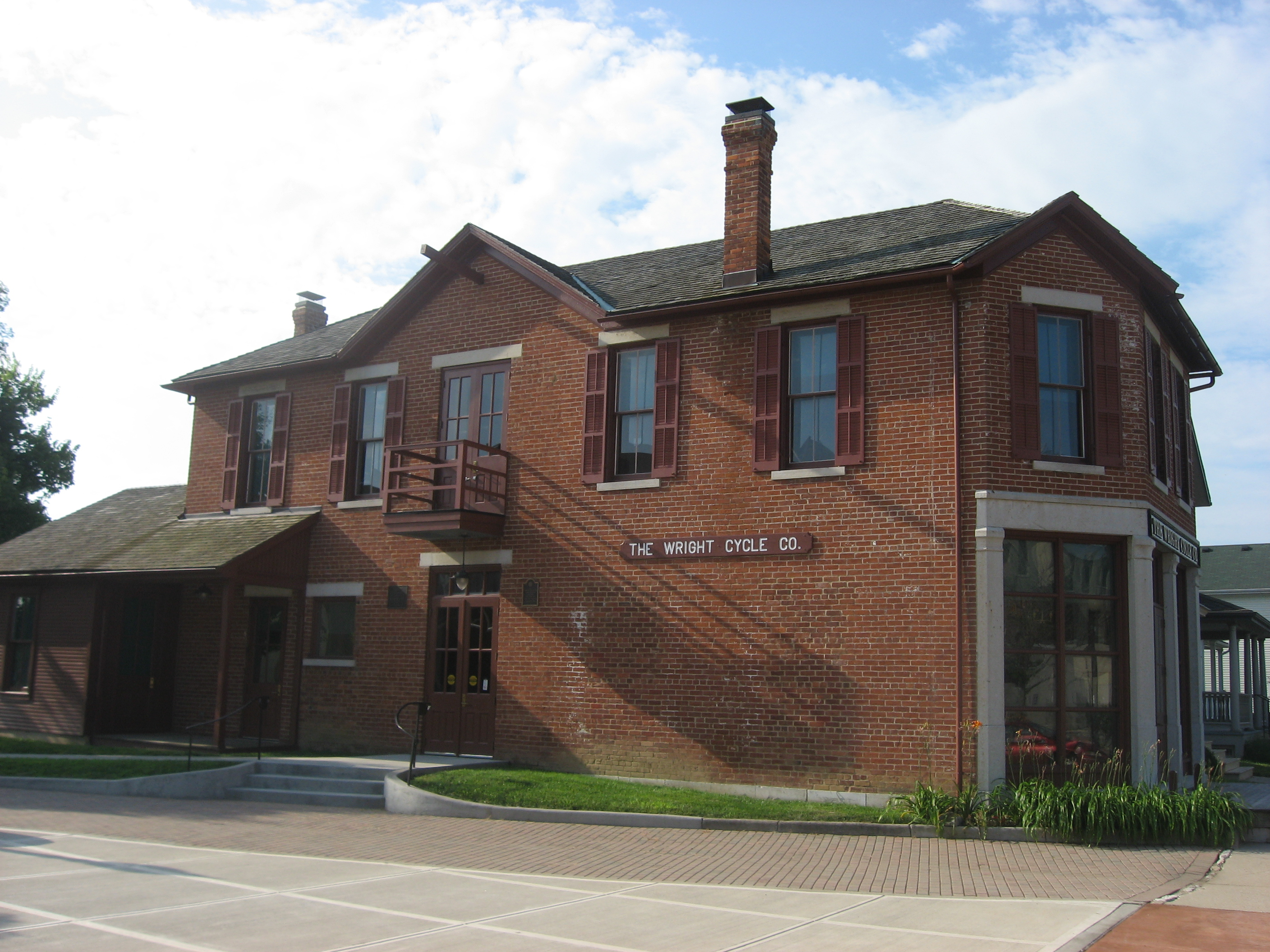
- Rented by Wright Brothers, 1895-97
- Location: 22 South Williams St., Dayton, Ohio
- Coordinates: 39°45′13.14″N 84°12′43.17″W
- Built: 1886
- Architect: Abraham and Joseph Nicholas
- Architectural style: Late Victorian
- NRHP reference No.: 86000236

Significant dates
- Added to NRHP: February 13, 1986
- Designated NHL: June 21, 1990

The bicycle business of the Wright brothers, the Wright Cycle Company (originally the Wright Cycle Exchange) successively occupied six different locations in Dayton, Ohio. Orville and Wilbur Wright began their bicycle repair, rental and sales business in 1892, while continuing to operate a print shop (they ended their local newspaper business in 1890). These shops helped them fund their aeronautical studies.

In 1896, they began manufacturing and selling bicycles of their own design, the Van Cleve, named after an early settler of Dayton, and the St. Clair, named after a territorial governor. They invented the self-oiling hub and devised the innovation of machining the crankarm and pedal on the left side with left-hand threads to prevent the pedal from coming unscrewed while cycling. The brick building at 22 South Williams St., where the Wrights worked from 1895 to 1897, is the only extant building on its original foundation and in its original location that housed a Wright bicycle shop. They ran their printing shop on the second-floor. The 22 South Williams Street building is part of Dayton Aviation Heritage National Historical Park and the National Aviation Heritage Area.

The Wrights used the profits from the Wright Cycle Company to finance their aviation experiments. In 1901, they fitted a third bicycle wheel horizontally above the front wheel of one of their St. Clair bicycles and used the apparatus as a test platform to study airfoil design. They built a six-foot wind tunnel on the second floor of their bicycle shop at 1127 West Third St., the last location of their bicycle business, and from October to December they conducted pioneering tests in the tunnel of over 200 shapes of scale-model wings.

In that same building, they designed and constructed their gliders and first airplane, the Wright Flyer, which cost under $1,000 to build. The shop closed in 1909 and they started their aviation company. In 1937, with Orville's cooperation, the building at 1127 West Third St. was moved to Greenfield Village, Dearborn, Michigan, by Henry Ford.

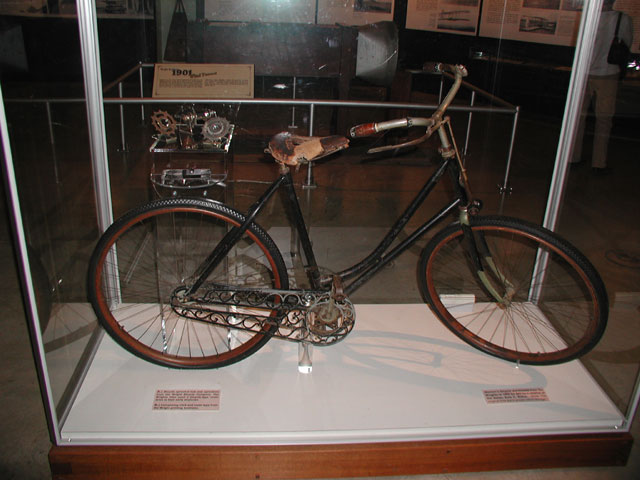
Wright bicycle in National Museum of the United States Air Force, Dayton, Ohio

== Shop locations ==
With the exception of the West Second Street location, which is located near the Schuster Center on the other side of the Miami River, all of the shops are located within about one block of each other.

- 1892—Wright Cycle Exchange at 1005 West Third Street
- 1893—Wright Cycle Exchange at 1015 West Third Street
- 1893 to 1894—Wright Cycle Exchange at 1034 West Third Street. The name later changed to Wright Cycle Co.
- 1895 to 1897—Wright Cycle Co. at two locations—the main store at 22 South Williams Street, and a branch store in downtown Dayton at 23 West Second Street. The branch closed in 1896.
- 1897 to 1909—The Wright Cycle Co. at 1127 West Third Street.

== Wright Cycle Exchange (1892–1893) ==
After both brothers purchased bicycles in the spring of 1892, their aptitude with bicycle repairs and the high demand for repairmen led them to starting their own repair shop. In December 1892, they rented a storefront at 1005 West Third Street, where they officially started the Wright Cycle Exchange. They sold bicycles from $40 to $100. In addition to these sales, they rented bicycles, and sold parts and accessories. The brothers then moved the shop to 1015 West Third street, where they even had a newspaper ad for the Exchange. By the end of 1893, the shop was moved to 1034 West Third Street, where the name was changed from Wright Cycle Exchange to Wright Cycle Company.

== Wright Cycle Company (1894–1909) ==
In 1895 the Wright Brothers moved to 22 South Williams Street, the only location of the six that is still standing today. It has been turned into the Wright Cycle Company Complex and the National Aviation Heritage Area. A second branch opened at 20 West Second Street in 1895, but closed down the next year. In 1896 the Wright Brothers began selling their own bikes. They sold the more expensive Van Cleve, and the cheaper St. Clair. Orville made his own additions to the bicycles, including the Oil-Retaining Wheel Hub and the Coaster-Brakes. This was the greatest era of success for the Wright Brothers. They operated at 22 South Williams Street from 1895 to 1897.

In 1897 the Wright Brothers moved their shop to 1127 West Third Street, the sixth and final location for the Wright Cycle Company. In 1900 they produced their Van Cleve Catalog, a catalog which promoted their famous Van Cleve, which now came in two models. After becoming increasingly invested in the Wright Glider, the Brothers manufactured very few bicycles after 1902, and completely stopped after 1904. In 1909, the shop at 1127 West Third Street was converted completely for airplanes, and the Wright Brothers sold the company to W.F. Meyers, who continued to sell Van Cleves until 1939. This marks the end of the Wright Cycle Company.

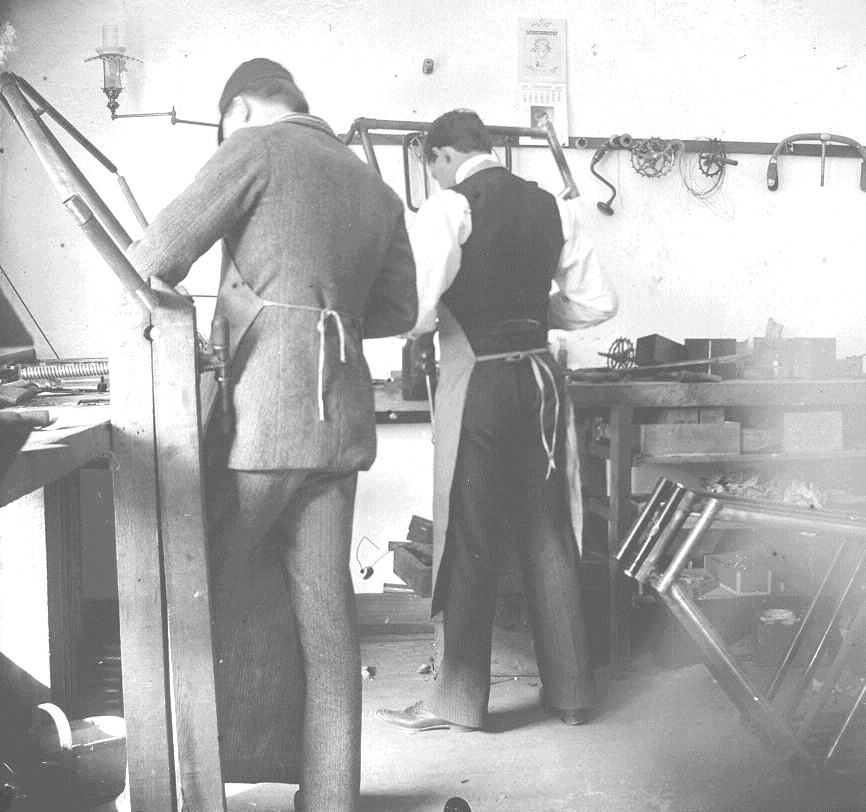
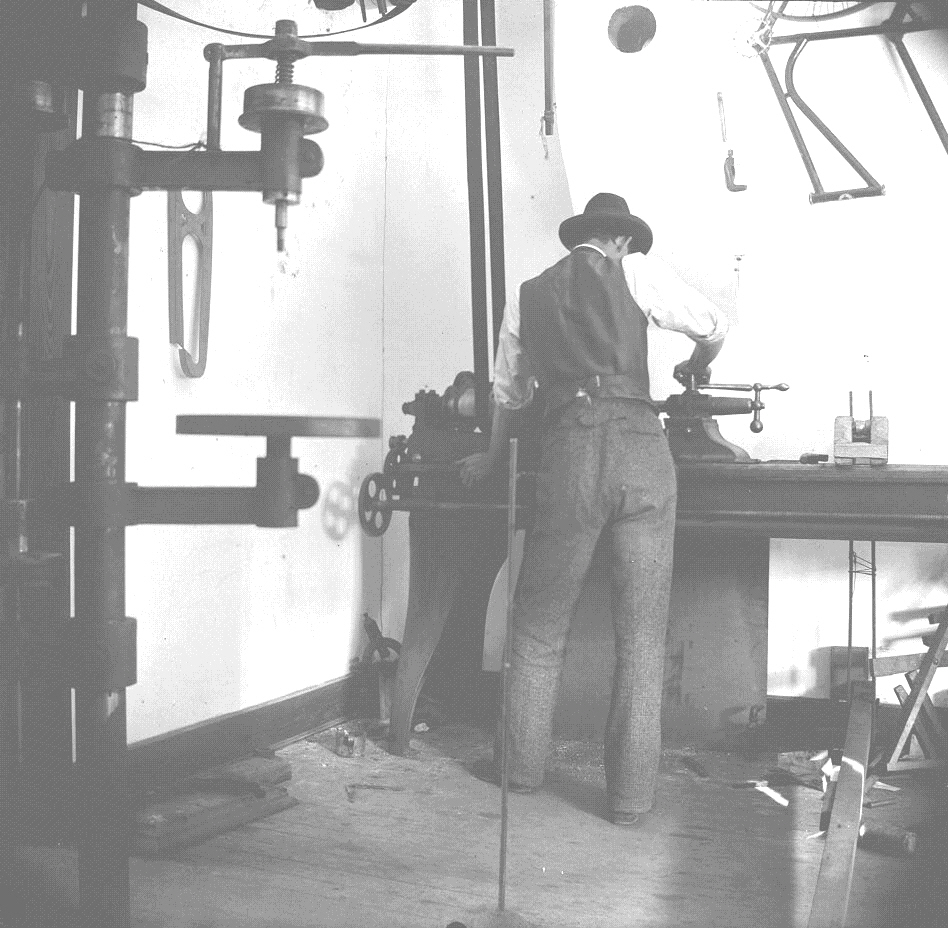
The 1127 West Third Street bicycle shop in 1897. Left photo: Orville (right) and boyhood friend Ed Sines; right photo: Wilbur.

== See also ==
- National Register of Historic Places listings in Dayton, Ohio
