= Liberty Belle (aircraft) =

Moniker for several B-17 and B-24 WWII aircraft

External media

Images
- 1950 with T-34 turboprop
- 2001 restoration

Video
- 2009 taxiing (vimeo)
- 2011 fire (CNN)
- 2011 fire (youtube)

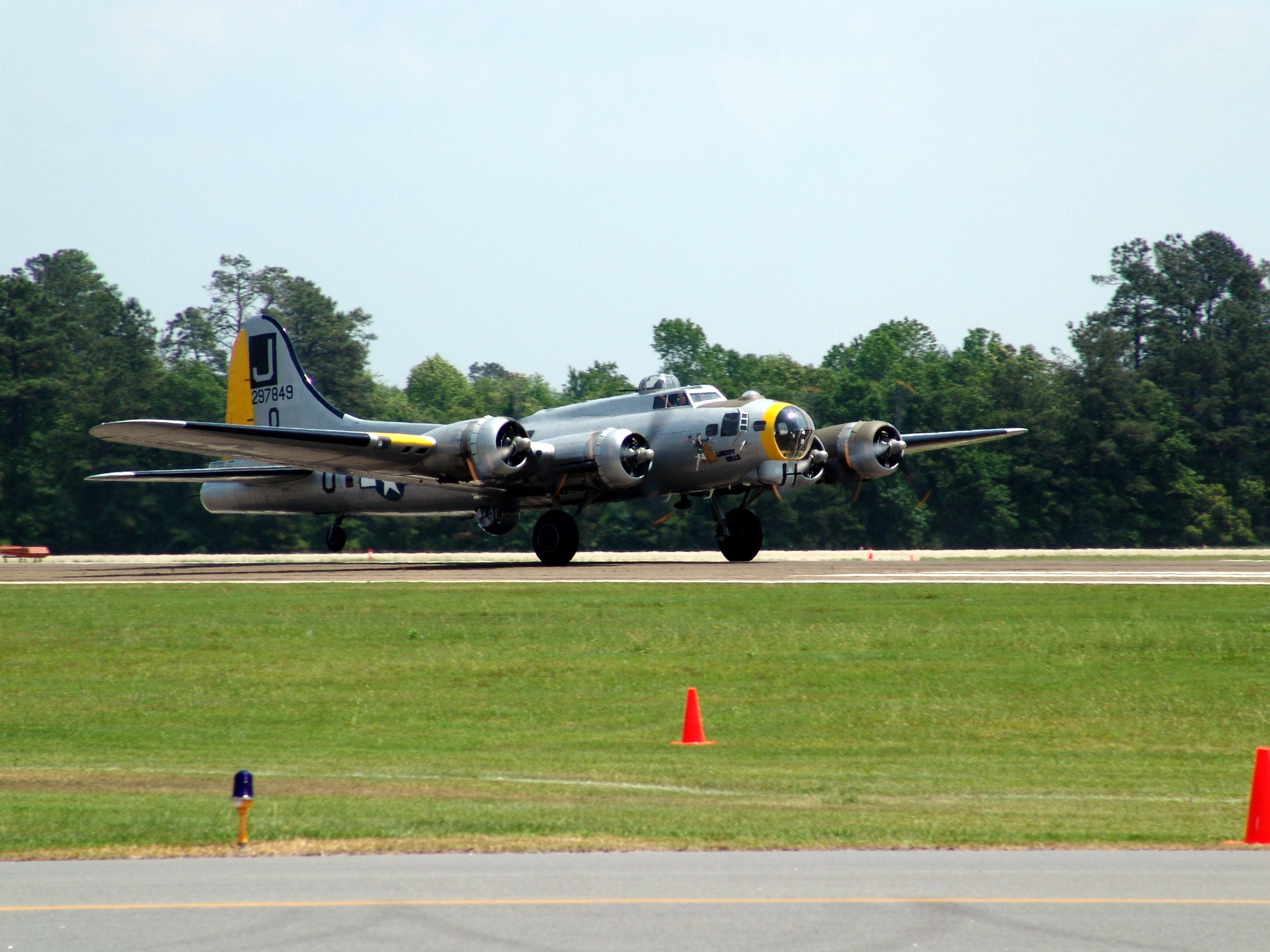
The B-17 Liberty Belle about to take off from the 2005 Lumberton Celebration of Flight.

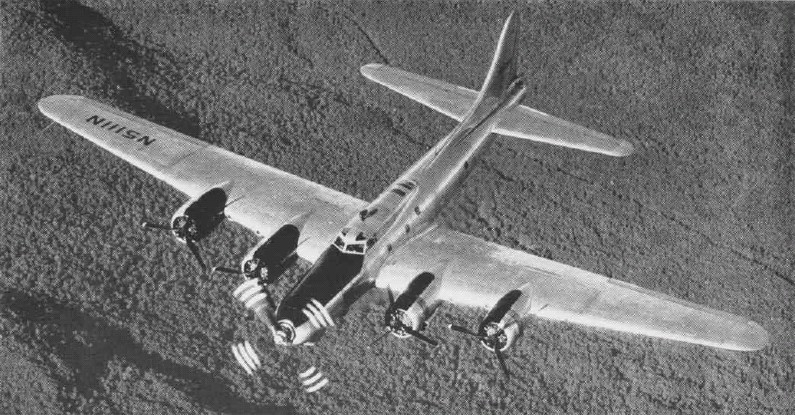
Sold as scrap on 25 June 1947, Pratt & Whitney subsequently bought B-17G USAAF serial 44-85734 (shown with a T34 turboprop mounted in its nose) and operated it from 1947 to 1967 as a testbed aircraft.

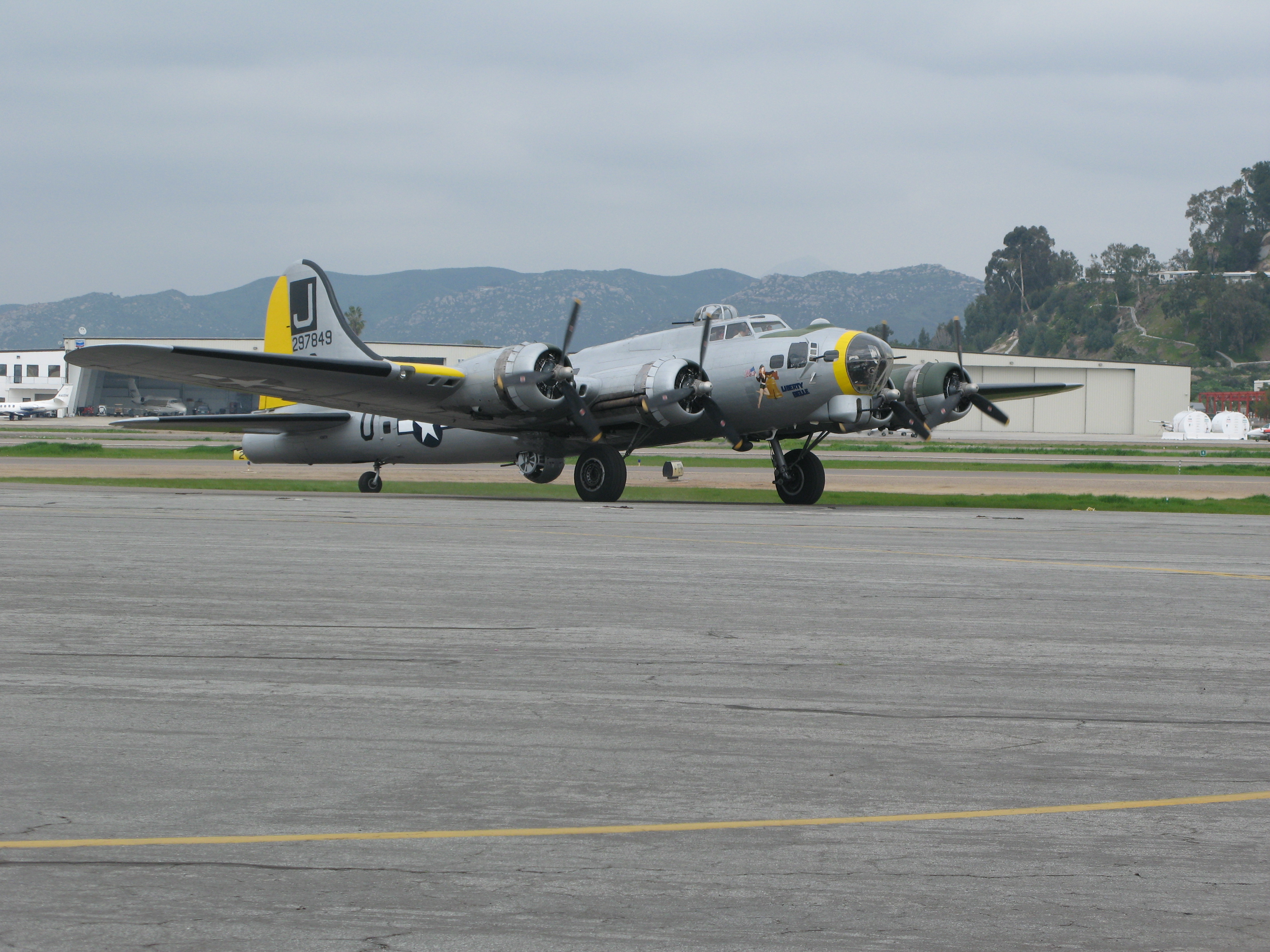
The B-17 warbird Liberty Belle at El Cajon, California March 2008

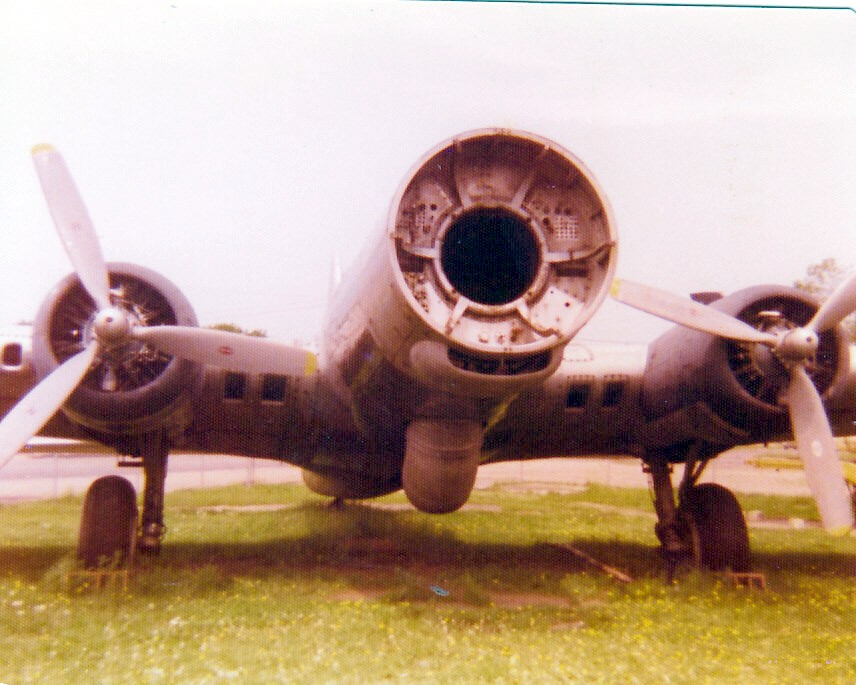
The aircraft that became the Liberty Belle on display at the Bradley Air Museum in the early 1970s. It was donated by Pratt & Whitney, which used it in this configuration as an engine testbed.

Liberty Belle was a popular name for United States Army Air Forces (USAAF) aircraft during World War II; over two dozen known individual Boeing B-17 Flying Fortresses and Consolidated B-24 Liberators used the name.

The combat Liberty Belles were commemorated by two B-17s which used the name, with one still remaining as a static display: Miss Liberty Belle (USAAF serial 44–83690) is displayed at the Grissom Air Museum. The Liberty Foundation flew a composite B-17 named Liberty Belle (constructed from two damaged aircraft (sn. 44-85734 and the rear part of sn. 44-85813)) as a warbird from 2004 until 2011, when it was destroyed in a fire after an emergency landing. It is currently under rebuild at the Brooks Aviation Center in Douglas, Georgia.

== Restored Liberty Belle B-17 ==
Boeing B-17 (sn. 44–85734) did not see combat in World War II, and was originally sold on 25 June 1947, as scrap to Esperado Mining Co. of Altus, Oklahoma; it was then sold again later that year for $2,700 to Pratt & Whitney, which operated the B-17 as a heavily modified testbed aircraft (similar to B-17s sn. 44-85747 and sn. 44-85813). Following these flights, it was donated to the Connecticut Aeronautical Historic Association, where a tornado on 3 October 1979, blew another aircraft onto the B-17's midsection, breaking the fuselage.

The B-17 was eventually purchased by aviation enthusiast Don Brooks, who formed the Liberty Foundation to exhibit it as the Liberty Belle. Restoration began in 1992 with parts from another damaged B-17 (sn. 44–85813), performed by Tom Reilly and company/Flying Tigers Warbird Restoration Museum (a.k.a. "Bombertown USA"), located at that time at Kissimmee Gateway field, Kissimmee, Florida. She returned to the air on 8 December 2004 and had been touring the country offering the public rides on the bomber. The Liberty Foundation also took an historic overseas tour in July 2008 along the northern ferry route to England.

On the morning of 13 June 2011, Liberty Belle made a forced landing in Oswego, Illinois, after taking off from Aurora Municipal Airport in Sugar Grove, Illinois. Shortly after takeoff, the pilot of a North American T-6 Texan being flown as a chase plane informed Liberty Belle's pilot that the B-17's inboard left wing was on fire and advised an immediate landing. The bomber landed successfully in a nearby field and the seven people on board were able to evacuate without injury; but due to the muddy ground in the field, fire engines could not reach it, allowing the fire to spread and destroy the aircraft. The bomber's remains were stored in a hangar in Aurora for a few days before being taken back to its home at Brooks Aviation Inc in Douglas, Georgia. It is currently under rebuild to airworthy status, using the forward fuselage of another B-17 (sn. 44–83387) and other new parts, but it is not known when the restoration will be completed.

== Museum 44-83690 ==
Miss Liberty Belle (sn. 44–83690), a B-17G, was modified postwar to serve with the United States Air Force as a drone director DB-17P, before being retired in 1958. It was on display at the Grissom Air Museum from 1961 to 2015, just outside the former Grissom Field in central Indiana where it was displayed as sn. 42–31255, Miss Liberty Belle of the 305th Bombardment Group stationed at RAF Chelveston that crashed in the English village of Wymington in 1944.

The aircraft was moved to the Museum of Aviation at Warner Robins, Georgia, in 2015 for restoration.
