= Grimes Manufacturing Company =

American aircraft lighting systems manufacturer

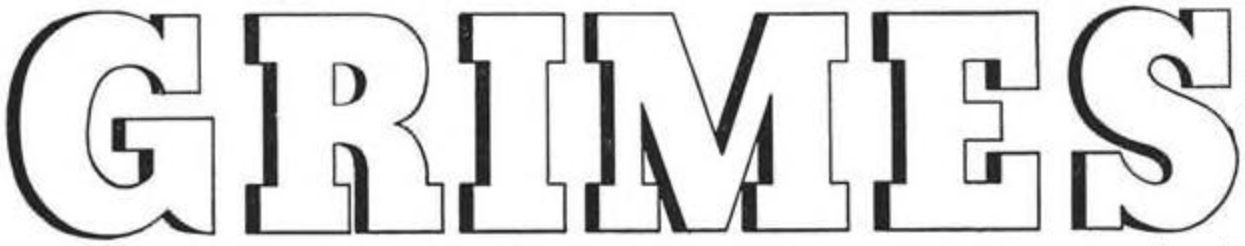
- Industry: Aerospace
- Founded: 1933
- Founder: Warren G. Grimes
- Defunct: 1997
- Fate: Purchased by Allied Signal
- Headquarters: Urbana, Ohio, United States
- Number of employees: 1,250 (1977)
- Parent: Midland-Ross Corporation (1977–1991); Allied Signal (1997–1999); Honeywell (1999–Present)

The Grimes Manufacturing Company was an American manufacturer of aircraft lighting systems located in Urbana, Ohio.

== History ==
The Grimes Manufacturing Company was founded by Warren G. Grimes in 1933. Grimes was given the idea after a small plane manufacturer that he visited in 1932 suggested that they would like to have a better light. Grimes used a portion of the Armbruster building before moving to an 1,800-square-foot (170 m^{2}) converted garage on North Russell Street, where the company was started in November 1933.

During World War II, the company built an additional building to handle the increased production. At the same time, it built Grimes Field, which it continued to operate until 1987. It again expanded in 1966, when construction began on a new 42,000-square-foot (3,900 m^{2}) addition.

From the 1960s to the 1980s, the company operated a Beech 18 called the Grimes Flying Lab to test its lights. (Note: After being sold in 1987, the aircraft was reacquired in 1999 for restoration.)

In 1977, Grimes was purchased by the Midland-Ross Corporation. Less than two years later Midland-Ross announced its intention to purchase a building at the Greenwood County Airport in Greenwood, South Carolina for the manufacturing operations of Grimes. Then, in 1981, Midland-Ross acquired the Mansfield Aircraft Products Company and made it a subsidiary of what was by then the Grimes Division. The division was restructured in 1982, with it being split into Grimes Galley Products, Grimes Lighting Products, and Grimes EL Products. The Grimes Galley unit closed two years later. Following a consolidation in 1991, the company reemerged as Grimes Aerospace. In 1992, construction began on a 20,000 square foot expansion of the Greenwood facility.

It was purchased by AlliedSignal in 1997. The sale would later be questioned after it was revealed that AlliedSignal pressured credit ratings companies to ignore the unrated bonds of Grimes investors. AlliedSignal, which would later become Honeywell, maintains as presence at two separate locations in Urbana.

== See also ==
- Navigation light
- Pilot-controlled lighting
