= Aurora Municipal Airport =

Airport in Aurora, Illinois, United States

Chicago/Aurora Municipal Airport
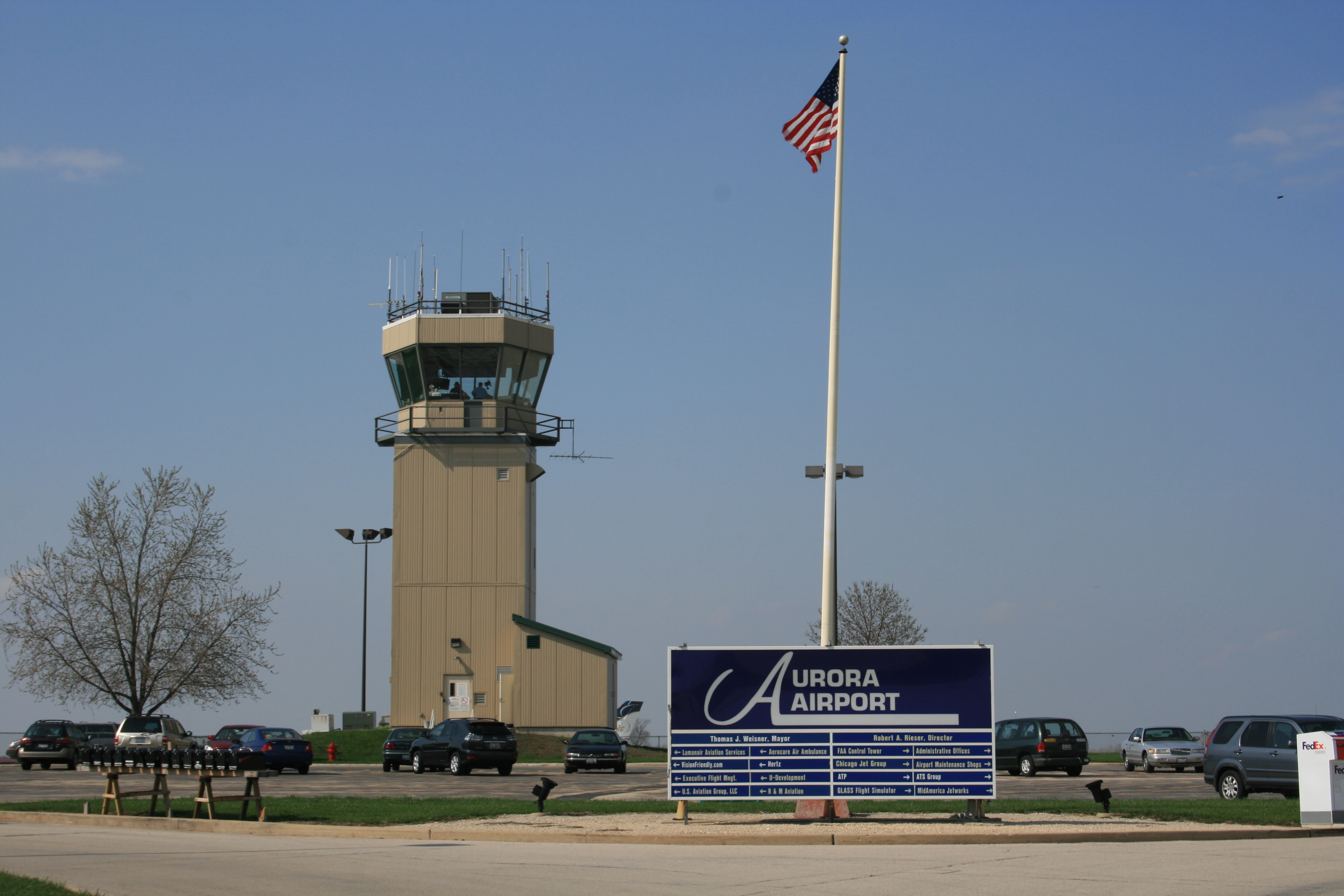
- IATA: AUZ; ICAO: KARR; FAA LID: ARR

Summary
- Airport type: Public
- Owner/Operator: City of Aurora
- Serves: Chicago metropolitan area
- Location: Sugar Grove, Illinois
- Opened: April 1966; 60 years ago
- Elevation AMSL: 712 ft (217 m)
- Coordinates: 41°46′19″N 088°28′32″W
- Website: www.aurora-il.org/530/Aurora-Municipal-Airport

Maps
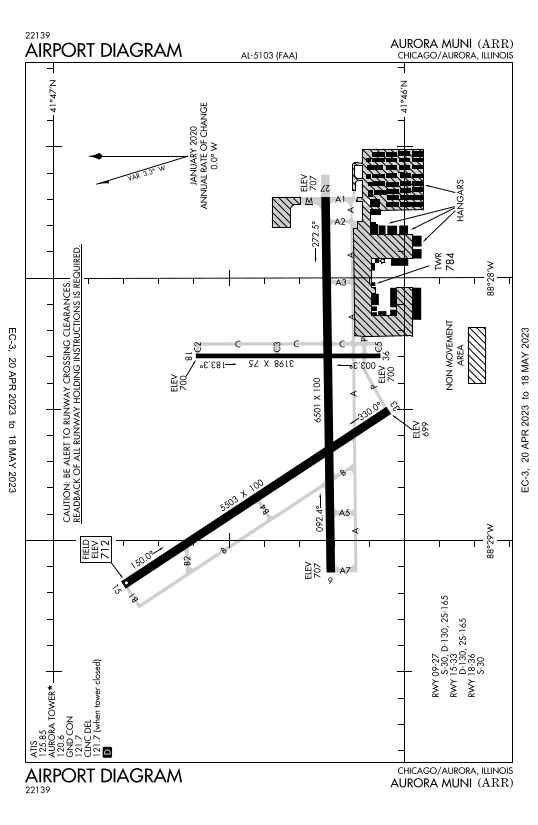
- FAA airport diagram

- Location of airport in Illinois AUZ/KARR/ARR (the United States)

Runways
Direction	Length		Surface
Direction	ft	m	Surface
9/27	6,501	1,982	Concrete
15/33	5,503	1,677	Concrete
18/36	3,198	975	Asphalt

Statistics
- Aircraft operations (2022): 76,885
- Based aircraft (2022): 197
- Source: FAA

Chicago/Aurora Municipal Airport (IATA: AUZ, ICAO: KARR, FAA LID: ARR) is a public airport opened in April 1966, located in the village of Sugar Grove, Illinois, United States, 8 miles (13 km) west of the city of Aurora, both in Kane County. The airport is owned and operated by the City of Aurora. It is 50 miles (80 km) west of Chicago and is designated as a reliever airport for Chicago's O'Hare and Midway airports.

Although most U.S. airports use the same three-letter location identifier for both the FAA and IATA, Chicago/Aurora Municipal Airport is assigned ARR by the FAA and AUZ by the IATA (which assigned ARR to Alto Río Senguer Airport in Argentina). The airport's ICAO identifier is KARR.

The airport is home to the Air Classics museum of Aviation, which strives to preserve aviation's role throughout history.

== Facilities and aircraft ==
Aurora Municipal Airport covers an area of 1,100 acres (450 ha), and contains three runways:

- Runway 9/27: 6,501 x 100 ft (1,982 x 30 m), surface: concrete
- Runway 15/33: 5,503 x 100 ft (1,677 x 30 m), surface: concrete
- Runway 18/36: 3,198 x 75 ft (975 x 23 m), surface: asphalt

For the 12-month period ending April 30, 2022, the airport had 76,650 aircraft operations, an average of 210 per day: 98% general aviation, 2% air taxi, <1% military, and <1% commercial. For the same time period, there are 197 aircraft based on the field: 144 single-engine and 23 multi-engine airplanes, 24 jets, 5 helicopters, and 1 glider.

J.A. Air Center and Revv Aviation are the airport's two fixed-base operators (FBOs). Together, they offer services such as fuel, general maintenance, hangars, courtesy cars and shuttles, conference rooms, crew lounges, snooze rooms, and more. They also offer flight training, aircraft rentals, and charter service businesses.

The airport received money from the Rebuild Illinois program, designed in 2021 to help airports complete upgrades and stay open during the COVID-19 pandemic, to rehabilitate parking lots, the entrance road, and perimeter roadways. In late 2022, the airport authority approved plans to upgrade hangars and other facilities.

== Incidents ==
- On June 13, 2011, the aircraft Liberty Belle, a B-17 Flying Fortress, crashed in Oswego, Illinois, after taking off from Aurora. Early reports indicate that, shortly after takeoff, the pilot reported an engine fire and attempted to return to the airfield. He was unable to do so, however, and chose instead to put the aircraft down in a nearby cornfield with seven people on board, all of whom were reported safe.

== Gallery ==
Aurora Municipal Airport

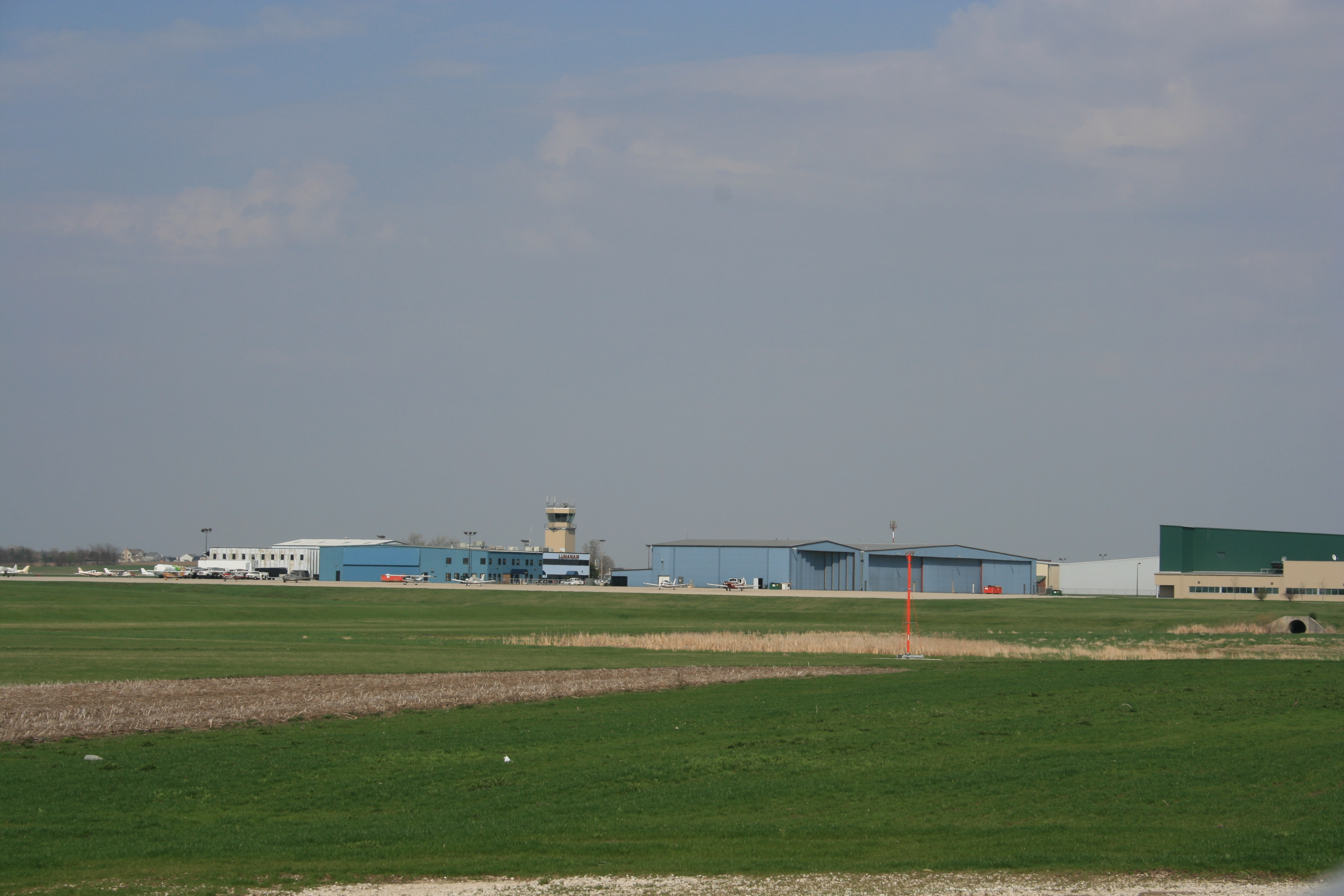
Aurora Municipal Airport (west side)

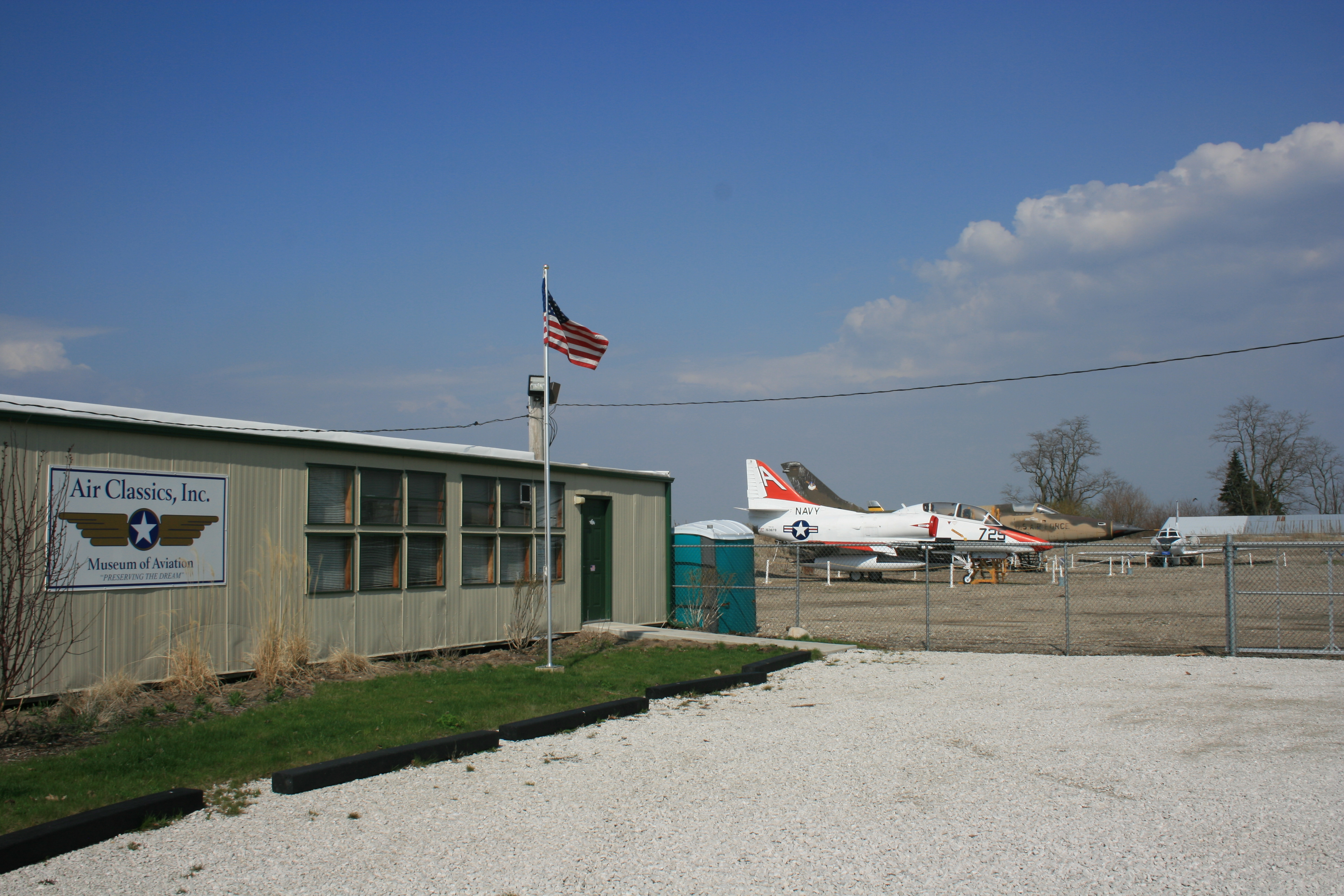
Air Classics Museum building

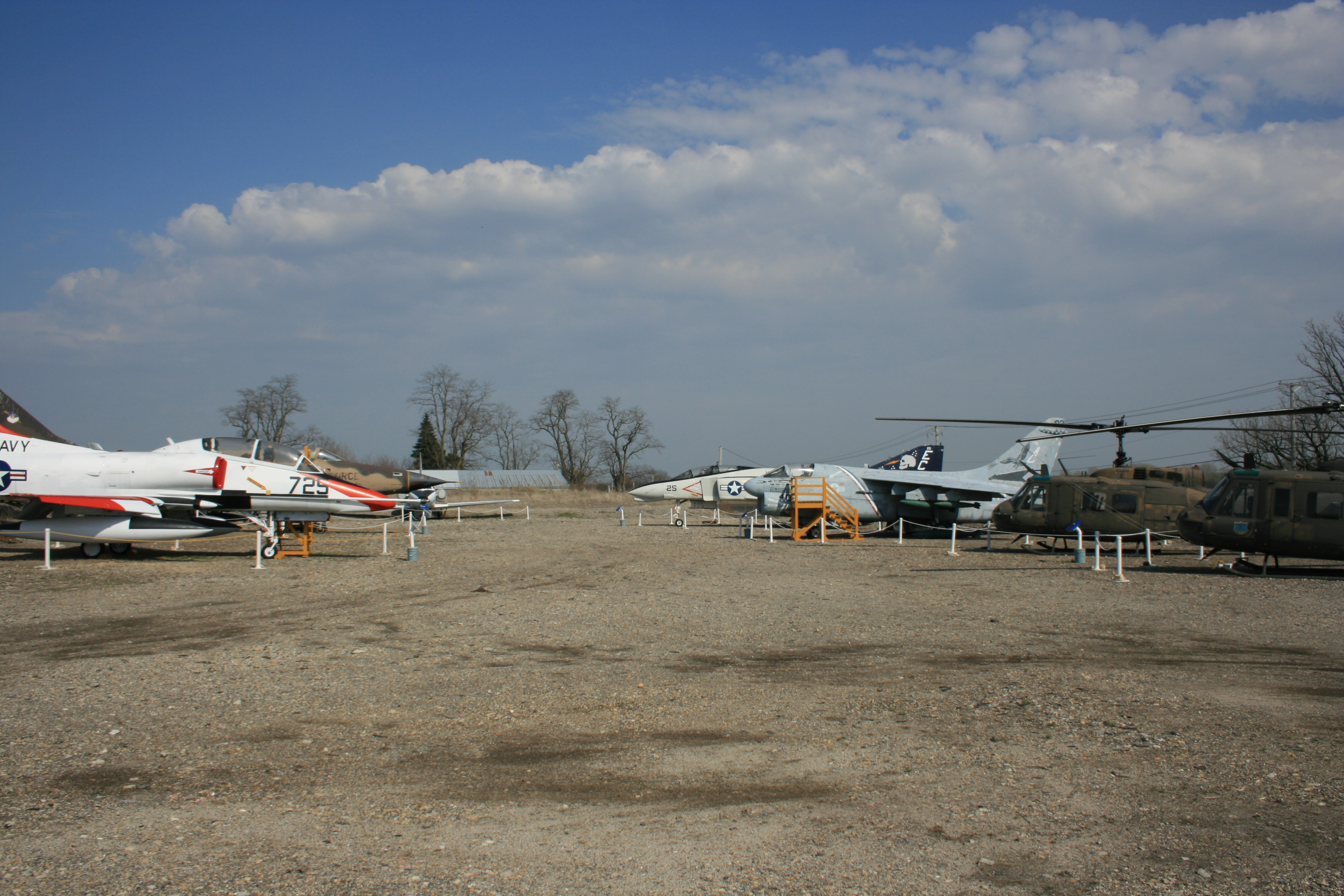
Air Classics Museum display

== See also ==
- List of airports in Illinois
- Aurora Transportation Center
