= Nutwood Place =

- U.S. National Register of Historic Places
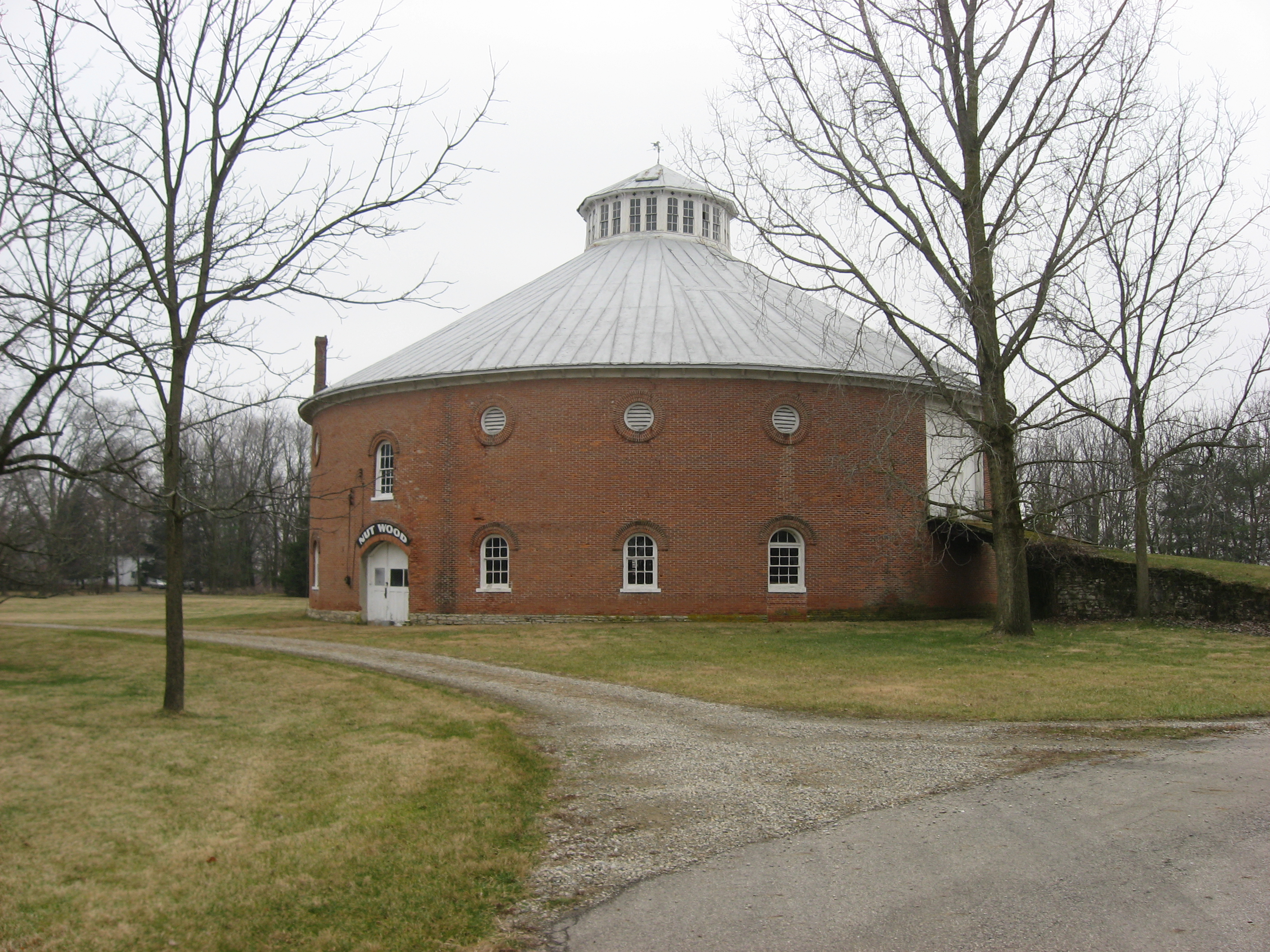
- Brick round barn at Nutwood Place

- Location within Ohio Location within the United States
- Location: 1428 Nutwood Place, Urbana, Ohio
- Coordinates: 40°7′36″N 83°45′11″W
- Area: 2 acres (0.81 ha)
- Built: 1815
- Architect: William J. Ward; A.C. Jennings
- NRHP reference No.: 76002265
- Added to NRHP: December 12, 1976

Nutwood Place is a historic farm complex on the northern edge of Urbana, Ohio, United States. Today composed of the farmhouse, a round barn, and a small amount of former fields, the farm has been owned by some of Urbana's leading families. Colonel William Ward, the founder of Urbana and the farm's original owner, built the farmhouse in 1815. At this time, he owned 160 acres (65 ha) of land north of the village of Urbana; there he established his farm under the name of "Nutwood Place," where he lived until his 1822 death.

Commercial hatter Absalom Jennings of New York City bought the farm in 1856, but he waited three years before taking up residence there. Here he remained for the rest of his life, breeding horses and cattle. Under his direction, the brick round barn was erected in 1861.

In 1976, Nutwood Place was added to the National Register of Historic Places because of its well-preserved historic architecture. It is one of eight places listed on the National Register in Urbana.
