= Grimes Field =

Public-use airport in Urbana, Ohio

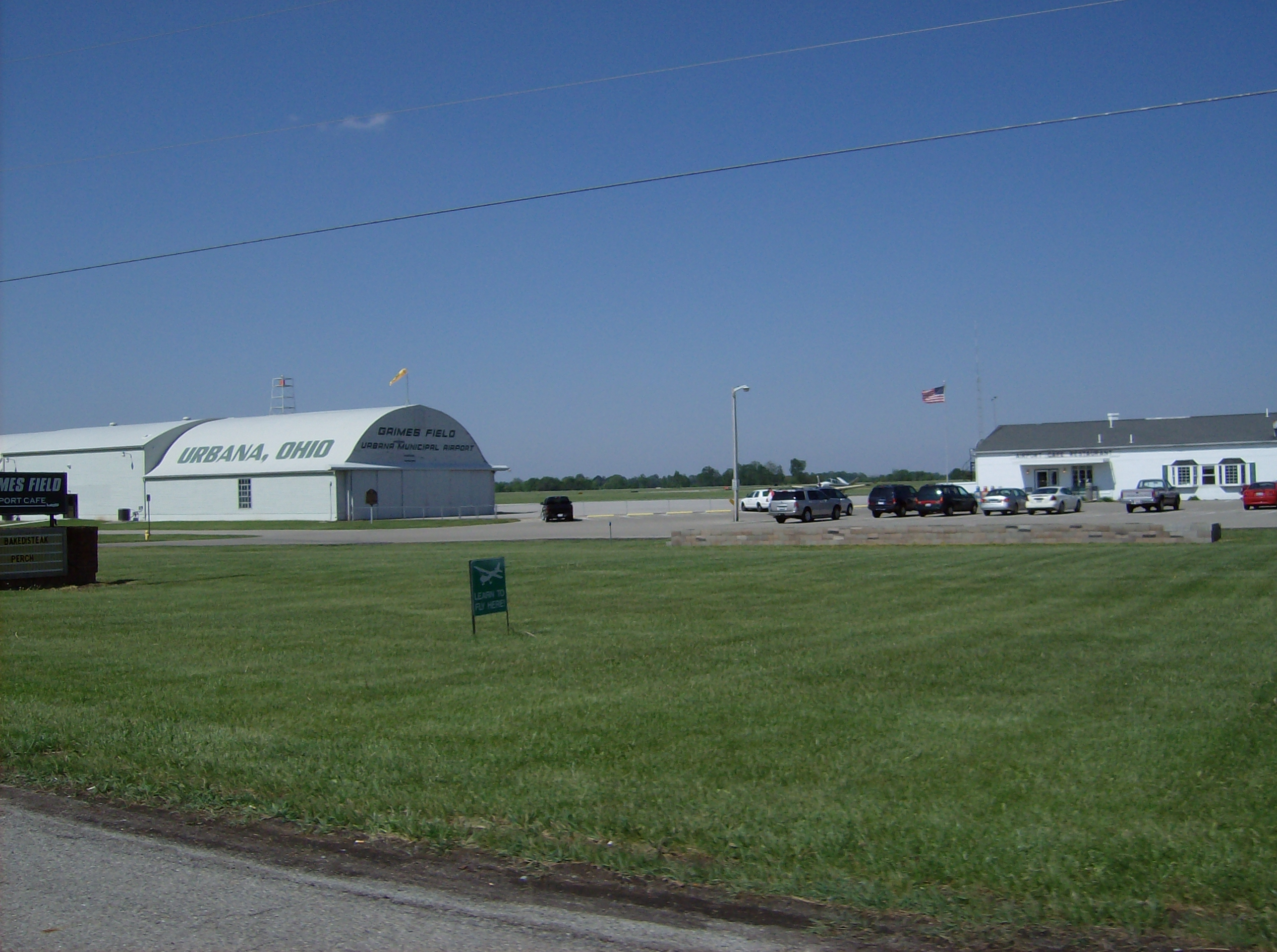
- IATA: none; ICAO: none; FAA LID: I74

Summary
- Airport type: Public
- Owner: City of Urbana
- Serves: Urbana, Ohio
- Built: 1933
- Time zone: UTC−05:00 (-5)
  - Summer (DST): UTC−04:00 (-4)
- Elevation AMSL: 1,068 ft (326 m)
- Coordinates: 40°07′57″N 083°45′13″W
- Website: www.urbanaohio.com/info-for-pilots.html

Map
- Location of airport in Ohio I74 (the United States)

Runways
Direction	Length		Surface
Direction	ft	m	Surface
02/20	4,400	1,341	Asphalt
01/19	3,000	914	Grass

Statistics (2019)
- Aircraft operations: 59,130
- Based aircraft: 48
- Source: Federal Aviation Administration

Grimes Field (FAA LID: I74) is a city-owned public-use airport located one nautical mile (1.85 km) north of the central business district of Urbana, a city in Champaign County, Ohio, United States. The airport is named after Warren G. Grimes, a forefather in the field of aviation lighting, and his Grimes Manufacturing Company operated the airport until 1987. It primarily serves general aviation traffic. Although it is owned by the City of Urbana, Grimes Field is self-supporting.

== History ==
On 18 September 1941, Urbana City Council accepted a $15,000 gift from Warren G. Grimes, the owner of Grimes Manufacturing Company, which built aircraft lighting systems. The money was to be used to pay more than half of the purchase price for just over 162 acres (66 ha) of land on which to build an airport. (Note: Grimes retained an additional approximately 20 acres (8.1 ha), which included the Nutwood Place farm, for himself. The round barn on the property was made available to the Urbana Saddle Club and the woods were donated to the state for a state park.) A total of 30 airplanes flew in for an unofficial "dedication" three days later. By mid October, site preparation was proceeding, with grading and leveling nearly finished. The construction of a 6,000-square-foot (560 m^{2}) hangar, which included a cornerstone containing the names of 1,152 individuals who made financial donations to pay for it, began in September 1942. By that point, three of four planned runways were almost complete. The airport was opened with a gathering of 100 Civil Air Patrol airplanes on 8 August 1943. The first ground school was held at the start of the following month and an office building had been completed.

A P-61 was flown to the airport in May 1949 to serve as an Air Scout clubhouse. Plans to pave the 2,500-foot (760 m) northeast-southwest runway were announced that December.

A 7,200-square-foot (670 m^{2}) addition to the workshop was mooted in June 1956. In mid 1959, the original hangar on the airport was split in half and the southern portion moved south. This allowed a 68-foot (21 m) section to be spliced in the center to enable larger airplanes to use the structure. By May 1960, the airport was being used by Grimes Manufacturing's Beech 18 test aircraft lights. By late December 1960, the runway had reached 2,700 feet (820 m). An extension lengthening the runway to 3,300 feet (1,000 m) was opened in early September 1961.

A proposal in 1971 would have used a $50,000 state grant to pave the existing 3,500-foot (1,100 m) runway and add 200-foot (61 m) grass overruns at both ends. (Note: The airport did not receive an earlier $100,000 state grant because it did not act in time.)

Grimes Manufacturing operated the airport until the end of June 1987. That year, the airport received a grant to conduct an environmental assessment as part of an expansion plan.

Approval was given by the city council to build a 12-unit hangar in March 1998. The following month a second hangar planned to be used as an aircraft paint shop was also approved, although several local residents voiced environmental concerns. A new 4,400-foot (1,300 m) runway, realigned to avoid obstructions, was built in 2001 to replace the old one. CareFlight opened a medical helicopter station in a new hangar at the airport in early October 2005.

A new hangar project had been started by the mid 2010s to make space to house more aircraft. In 2017, 20 World War II era B-25 Mitchell bombers were staged at the airport to commemorate the 75th Anniversary of the Doolittle Raid.

The airport received $795,000 in 2021 for facility upgrades, including improving and replacing runways, taxiways, and airport-owned towers. Additional upgrades were to be made to the airport's terminal and multimodal connections to the airport. An additional $144,000 was awarded in 2023 through the Bipartisan Infrastructure Law as part of the Federal Aviation Administration's Airport Infrastructure Grant program.

== Facilities and aircraft ==
=== Facilities ===
Grimes Field covers an area of 329 acres (133 ha) at an elevation of 1,068 feet (326 m) above mean sea level. It has two runways: 02/20 with an asphalt surface measuring 4,400 by 100 feet (1,341 x 30 m), and 01/19 with a grass surface measuring 3,000 by 100 feet (914 x 30m). The airport is home to the Airport Cafe, a small restaurant situated at the edge of the parking ramp in the main terminal building.

The airport has a city-operated Fixed Base Operator. The company sells avgas and offers limited amenities.

=== Aircraft ===
For the 12-month period ending Sept 8, 2019, the airport had 59,130 aircraft operations, an average of 162 per day: 97% general aviation, 2% air taxi, and <1% military. At that time there were 48 aircraft based at this airport: 38 single-engine and 9 multi-engine airplanes as well as 1 helicopter.

=== Museums ===
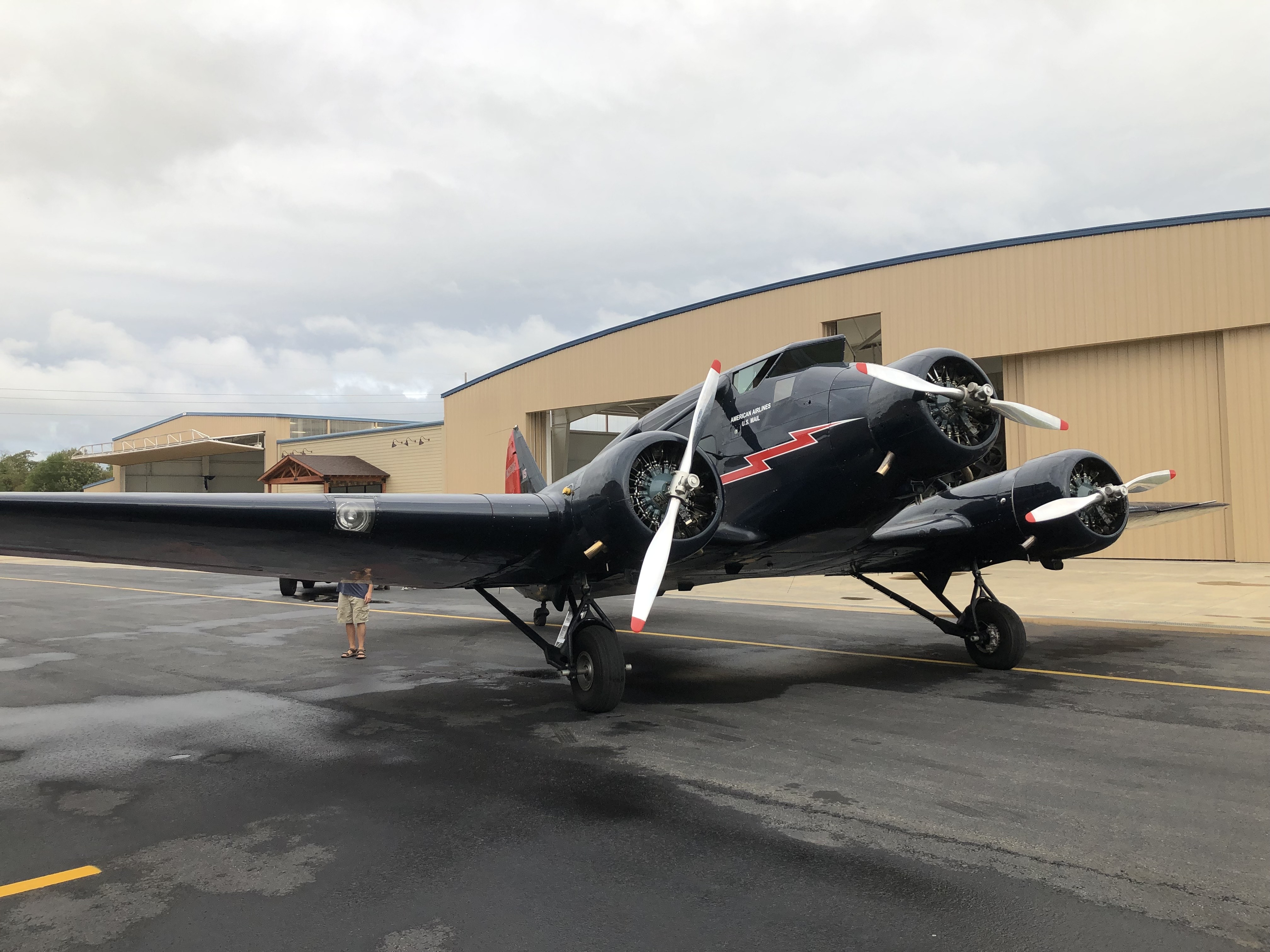
A Stinson SM-6000 that was restored at the northern branch of the Mid America Flight Museum

There are 3 museums operating at Grimes Field:

- The Champaign Aviation Museum
- The Grimes Flying Lab Foundation
- The northern branch of the Mid America Flight Museum.

== Events ==
Grimes Field is host to several events each year, such as FAA Wings Seminars, an EAA Young Eagles Event, a Military Appreciation Day, a Hot Air Balloon Festival, and a July 4th Car Show. The airport also hosts the Mid-Eastern Regional Fly In (MERFI).

== Accidents & incidents ==
- On 5 June 1994, a Renegade Spirit crashed while attempting to return to the airport after developing engine problems.
- On September 10, 2008, a Cessna 150 crashed while landing at the Grimes Airport. The pilot gradually reduced power while flying the traffic pattern and applied carburetor heat on the base leg. Soon after, the engine began to gradually lose power over a period of 5 seconds. It did not subsequently respond to throttle or mixture control movements. The pilot then established a descent to avoid a stall and landed in a grass area 50 feet short of the runway; after touchdown the nose gear collapsed and the airplane came to an abrupt stop. The probable cause of the accident was found to be a loss of engine power due to carburetor ice.
- On June 20, 2009, a Piper PA-24 Comanche crashed after departure from the Grimes Airport. During the engine run-up prior to the first flight of the day, the pilot noted there was no resistance on the control knob when he checked the operation of the carburetor heat and there was a slightly “sluggish” return in the RPM as it returned to normal. When he applied carburetor heat during the engine run-up for the second flight of the day, the pilot noticed “RPM needle wiggled down 50” then returned to the set RPM. The second takeoff was normal until the airplane was 200 feet above the runway, when it began to feel “soggy.” The pilot stated he raised the landing gear to reduce drag, but it did not seem like the engine was producing power. The pilot then extended the landing gear and decided to land the airplane in a field off the end of the runway. The landing gear, which was not locked down, collapsed during the landing and the left wing was substantially damaged when it contacted a runway end identifier light. The probable cause of the accident was found to be a failure of the carburetor heat cable attach bracket, which resulted in the inadvertent activation of carburetor heat and the subsequent loss of engine power during takeoff.

== See also ==
- List of airports in Ohio
