= Armstrong Air & Space Museum =

Museum in Wapakoneta, Ohio, United States

Coordinates: 40°33′50″N 84°10′16″W

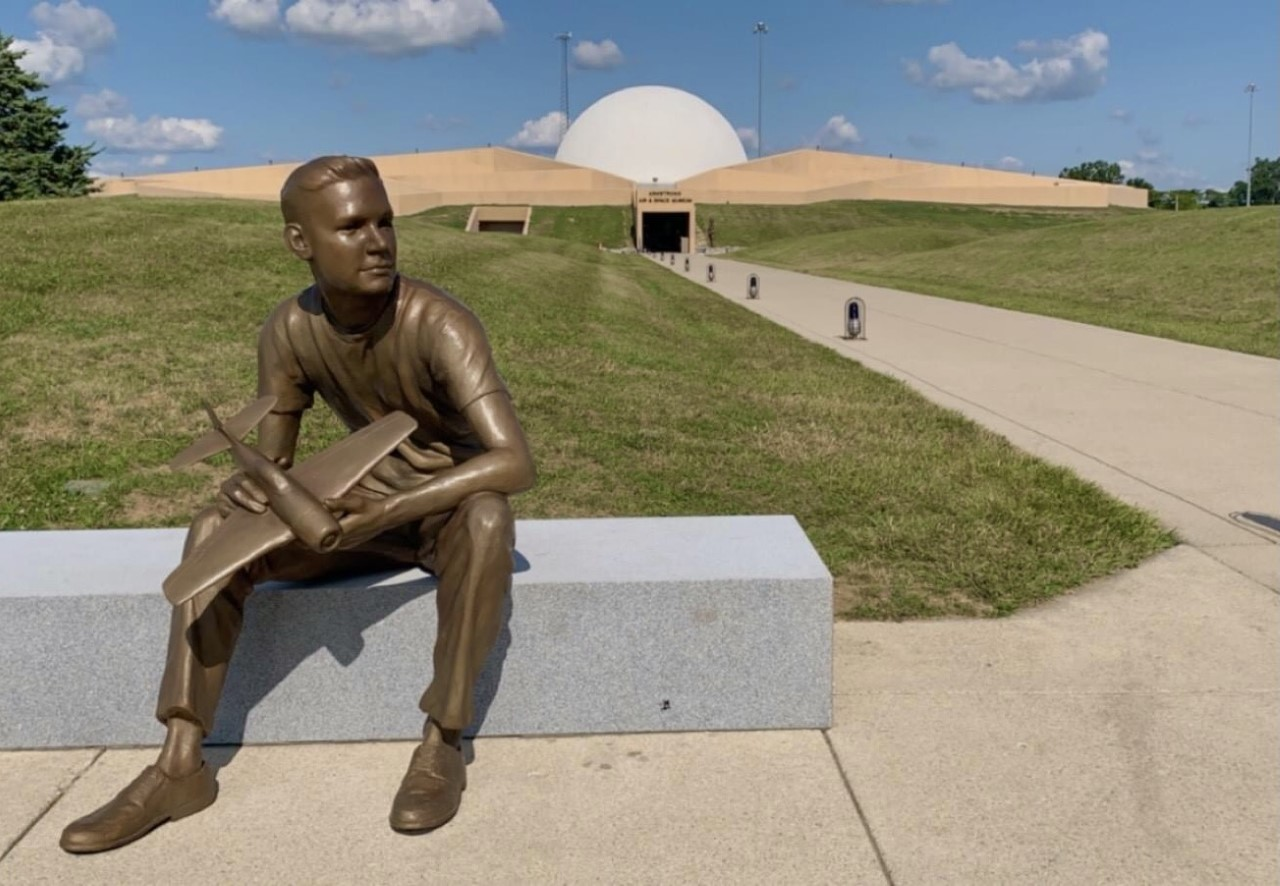
- Armstrong Air & Space Museum with statue in 2019
- Former name: Neil Armstrong Air & Space Museum
- Established: 20 July 1972
- Location: Wapakoneta, Ohio
- Type: History/science museum
- Accreditation: American Alliance of Museums
- Visitors: > 40,000
- Executive director: Dante Centuori
- President: Kraig Noble
- Curator: Logan Rex
- Historian: Greg Brown
- Website: www.armstrongmuseum.org

The Armstrong Air & Space Museum is a museum in Wapakoneta, Ohio, the hometown of aviator and astronaut Neil Armstrong, the first man to set foot on the Moon. Opened in 1972, the museum chronicles Ohio's contributions to the history of aeronautics and space flight. The museum is home to the original Gemini 8 spacecraft piloted by Armstrong to perform the world's first space docking, two of Armstrong's space suits, multiple items from the Apollo Program missions, a Moon rock brought back during the Apollo 11 mission, and an F5D Skylancer. The museum has several main galleries that cover spaceflight history from the early beginnings of the Space Race to the end of the Space Shuttle era. In the museum's Astro-theater, multimedia presentations and documentaries are cast upon the interior of the dome.

The Armstrong Museum is a member site in a larger network of museums and destinations owned by the Ohio History Connection. The National Aviation Heritage Area (NAHA) lists the Armstrong Air & Space Museum as one of its partner organizations, citing its preservation of historically relevant material related to the history of aerospace. While the museum bears the name of the famed Apollo 11 astronaut, Armstrong had no formal connection with the museum nor did he benefit from the organization in any way.

== Neil Armstrong's early years ==
Neil Alden Armstrong was born on August 5, 1930, on his grandparents' farm, in Washington Township, Auglaize County, near Wapakoneta to Stephen and Viola Armstrong. Neil was the oldest of the Armstrong's three children. Stephen Armstrong was an auditor and was tasked with examining the books from different Ohio counties. The family moved over thirteen times during Neil's childhood, eventually settling back down in Wapakoneta in the mid-1940s. During Armstrong's life in Wapakoneta, he graduated high school and received his pilots license from the now defunct Port Koneta Airfields located on the North end of Wapakoneta. After graduation, Neil went to college at Purdue University to study aeronautical engineering. His schooling was interrupted when the Navy called upon Armstrong to fight in the Korean War conflict.

== History ==
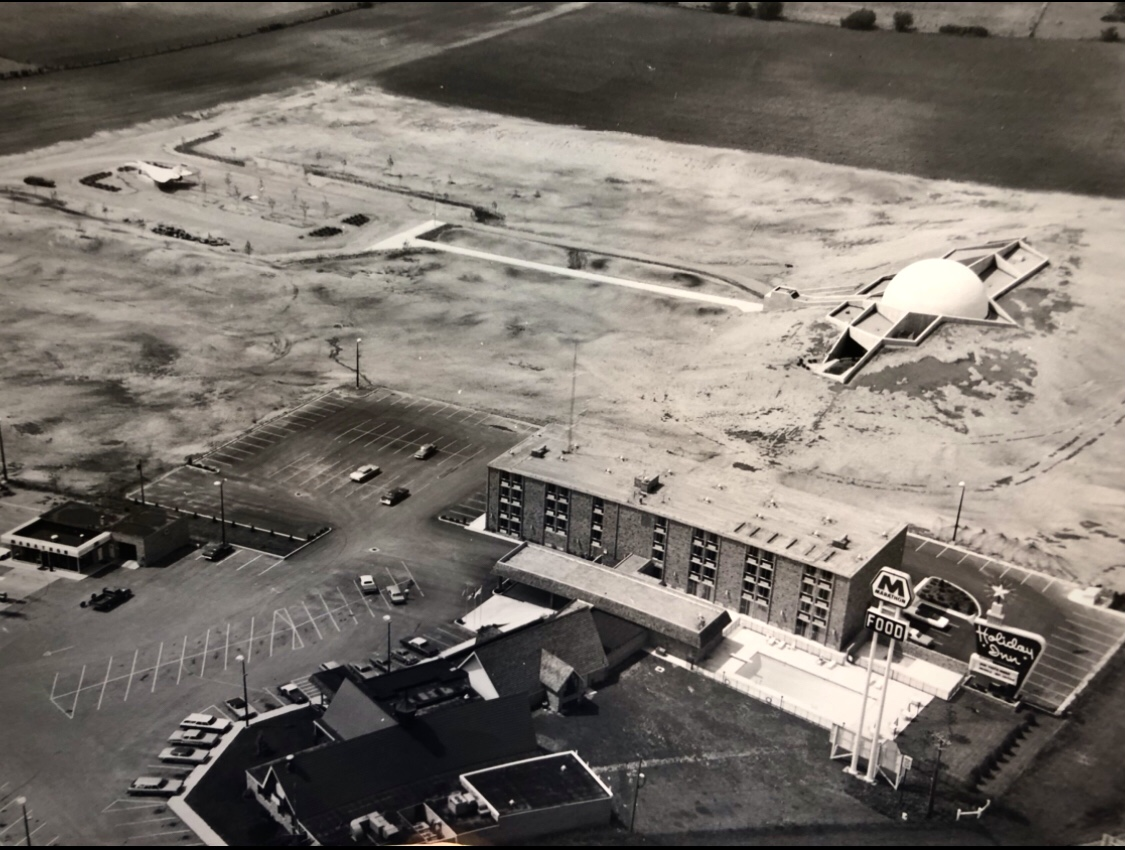
Aerial view of the Armstrong Museum looking north in 1972.

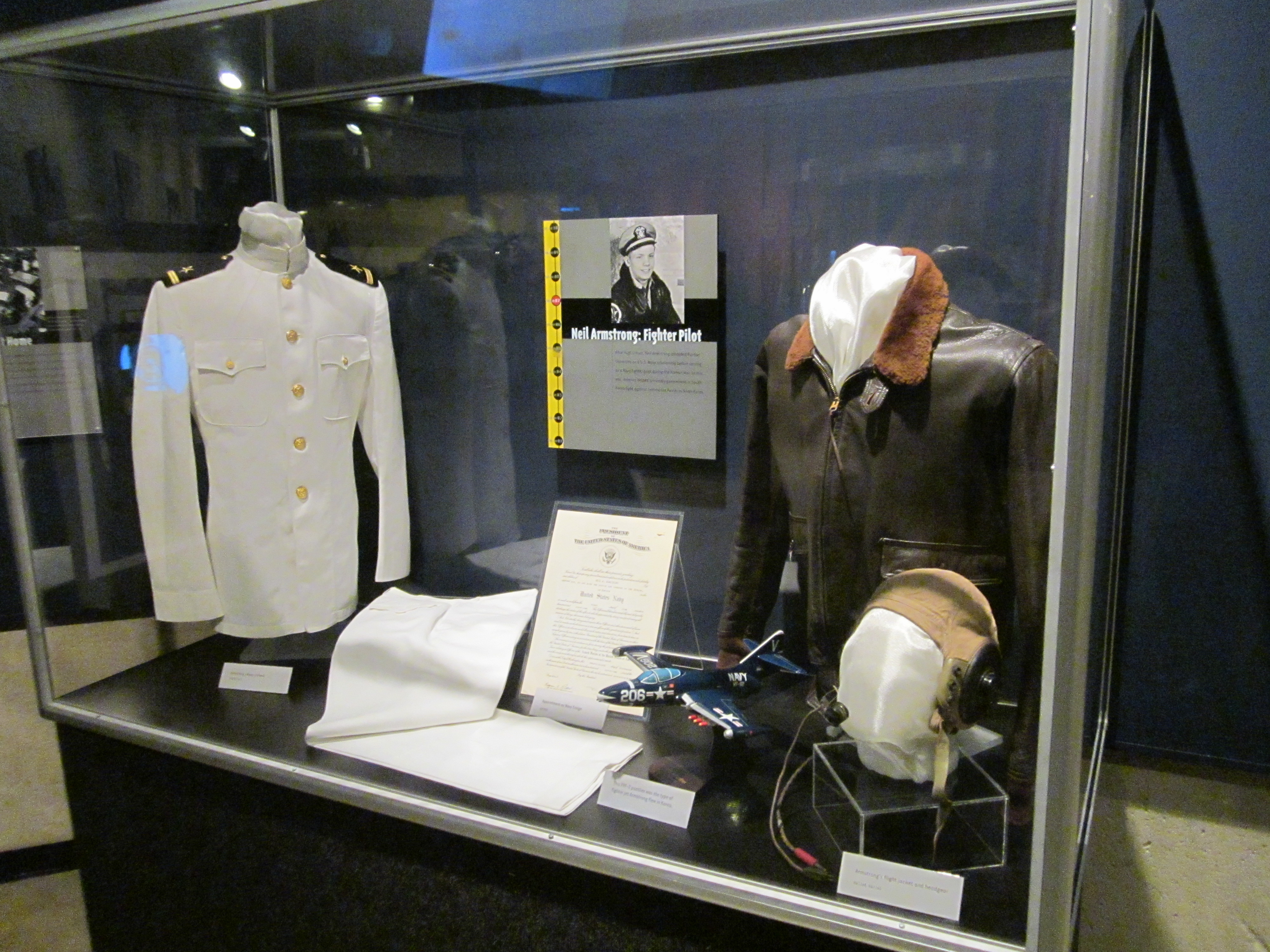
Artifacts related to Armstrong's Naval service

On July 21, 1969, with Neil Armstrong and Buzz Aldrin still on the lunar surface, then Ohio Governor James Rhodes proposed to build a museum in Armstrong's hometown of Wapakoneta in his honor. Rhodes declared that the facility would honor "all Ohioans who attempted to defy gravity." The governor pledged that the State of Ohio would contribute $500,000 to the project if the community could provide matching funds. Local efforts to raise the necessary money began immediately after the announcement, with a number of Wapakoneta residents forming a centralized fundraising committee. Over 9,000 people in the area donated to cause within the first year, surpassing the governor's request and raising $528,313.55.

=== Construction ===
Governor Rhodes appointed Dan Porter of the Ohio Historical Society to head the overall project. A committee was formed soon after to share ideas, accept bids, and collect relevant artifacts. The museum's winning design was an architectural first, with officials choosing a simulated lunar base layout. The design was a geometric, steel-reinforced concrete building with large earth mounds surrounding the structure to resemble being underground." On the Moon, these mounds would have protected the base from micro-meteorites and the harsh radiation from space. The building's most noticeable feature is its large white dome placed in the center of the structure, which would have been used as a pressure dome if on the lunar surface. Because of its white appearance and the museum's association with the Apollo 11 mission, the dome has also become known to symbolize the Moon. A large straight walkway with airport landing lights guides visitors to the front entrance, with the original concept representing a lunar landing strip.

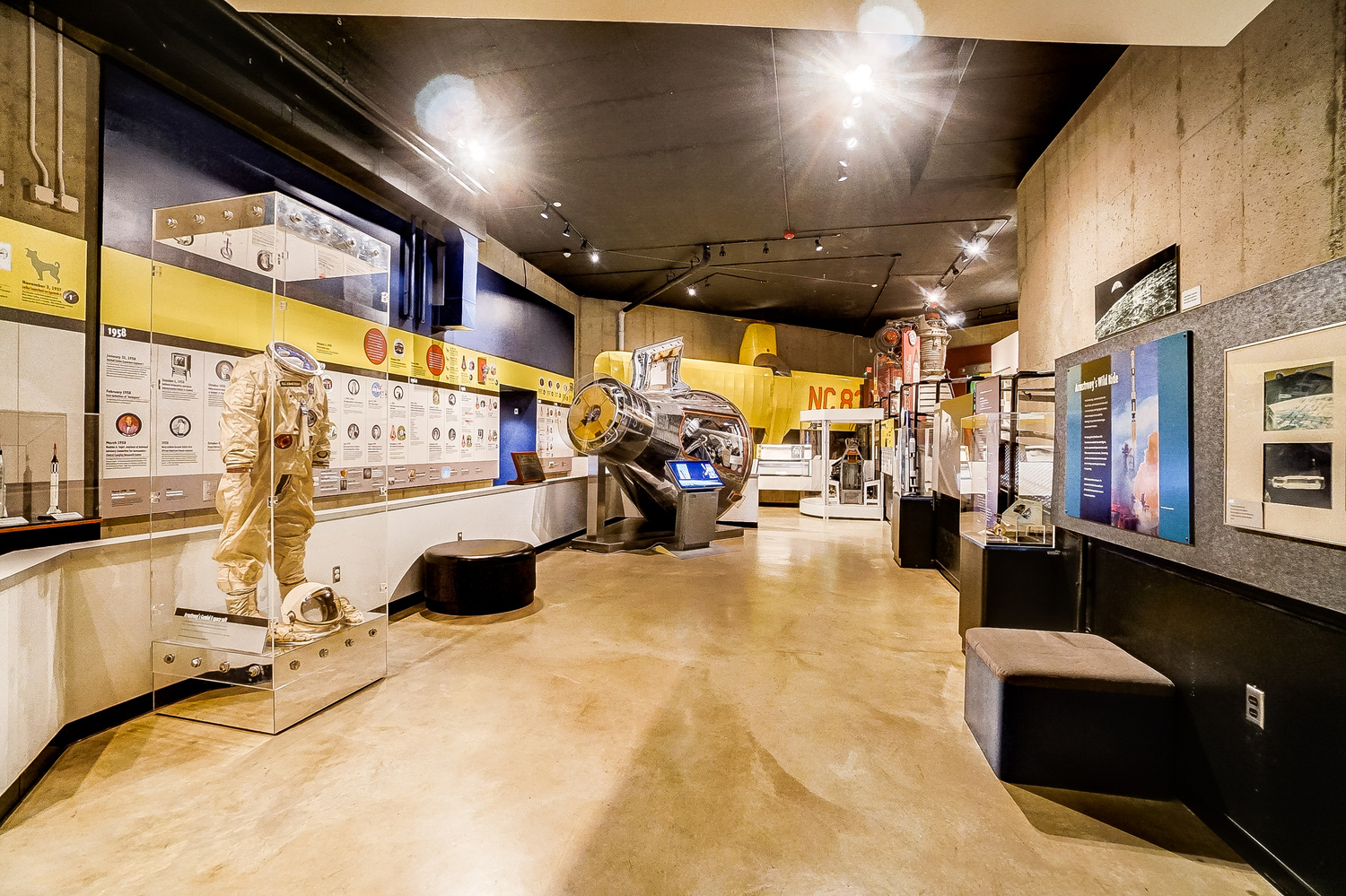
Armstrong Museum Early Gallery, Aug 2021.

The groundbreaking took place on April 16, 1970 in a 16 acre plot of farmland on the east-end of city. The creation of inside exhibits was given to Tom Crouch of the Ohio Historical Society. Years later, Crouch was named as a Curator for the National Air and Space Museum in Washington DC. Many of the museum's inaugural artifacts included the Gemini VIII spacecraft, an H-1 rocket engine, and Armstrong's spacesuits.

On July 20, 1972, three years after the historic Moon landing, the museum held its grand opening, honored by the attendance of Armstrong, his family, and Tricia Nixon Cox, standing in for her father, Richard M. Nixon, President of the United States." Tricia Nixon Cox also had the distinction of transporting an Apollo 11 lunar sample to the museum for display. An estimated 10,000 people attended the opening, with doors unlocking at precisely 2:00 pm.

=== Expansions ===
The first major expansion for the museum occurred in the late 1990s, which removed a garden on the museum's south wing and constructed the Modern Space Gallery in its place. The gallery tells the story of space after the Apollo Program with an emphasis on the Space Shuttle Program and the overall progress of space travel. The area includes two interactive simulators that allows visitors to land a Lunar Module on the Moon or land the Space Shuttle on a runway.

Another major expansion occurred in 2019, which included adding the Neil Armstrong STEM Inspiration Center, a classroom space that allows schools groups to conduct hands-on programming and experiments. The center is also used for a number of events the museum hosts over the course of the year.

Late at night on July 28, 2017, a solid gold replica of an Apollo Lunar Module was stolen.

In August 2020, the first production Learjet 28, which was used by Neil Armstrong to set five aerospace records, was donated to the museum.

The museum completed a renovation of its lobby in January 2024.

== Museum exhibits ==
=== Craft ===
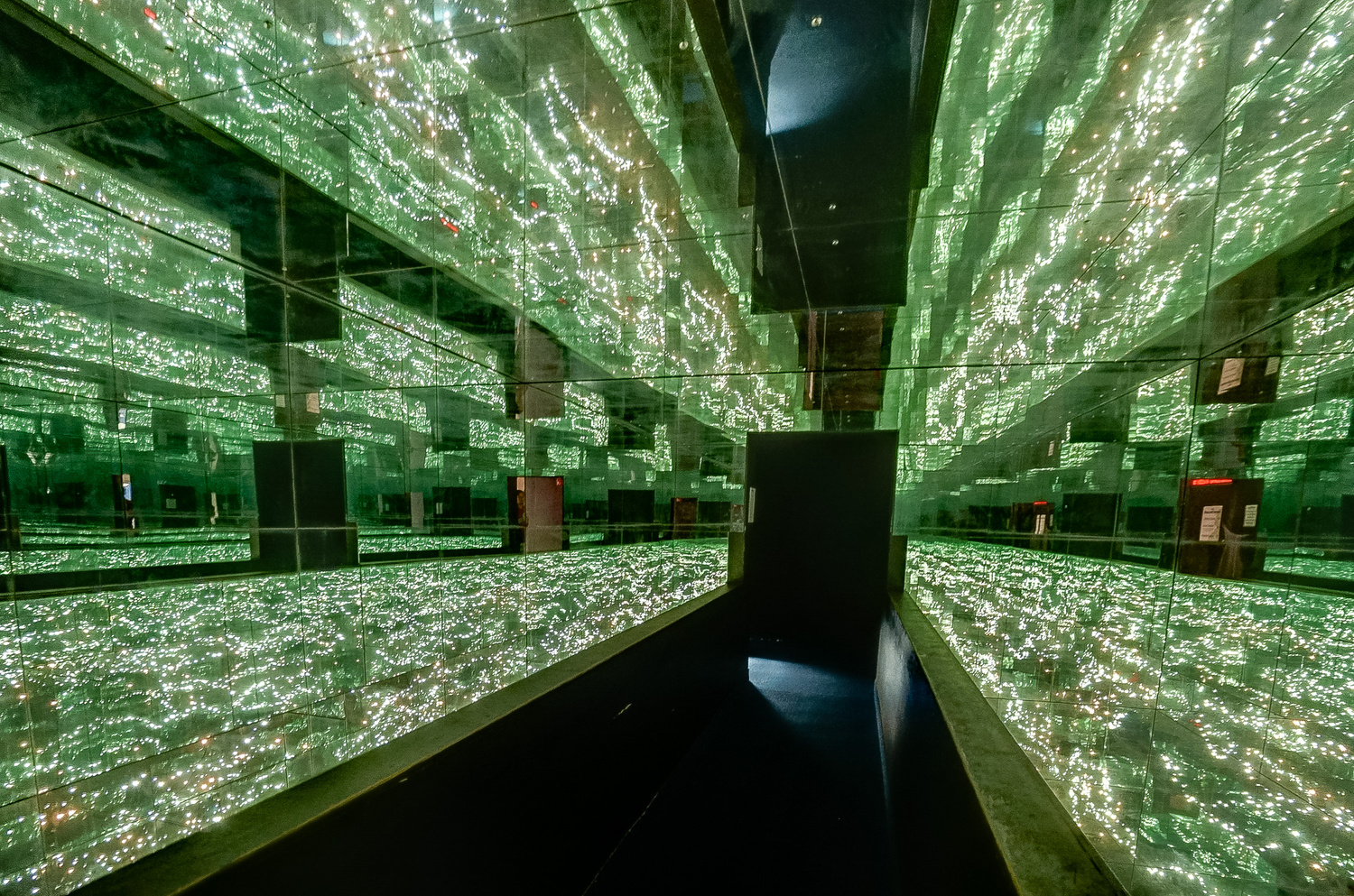
The Infinity Room, an exhibit at the museum since 1972.

- Gemini 8 spacecraft, flown by Neil Armstrong and David Scott in 1966
- Douglas F5D Skylancer
- Aeronca Champion, the first plane Neil Armstrong learned how to fly
- Learjet 28 Longhorn, only aircraft Neil Armstrong set aviation world records in
- Gemini spacecraft mockup (outdoor; visitors can sit inside)
- Apollo spacecraft mockup (outdoor)

=== Suits/garments ===
- Neil Armstrong's Gemini 8 spacesuit
- Neil Armstrong's Apollo 11 backup spacesuit
- In-flight suit worn by astronaut Eugene Cernan, who later became the last man on the Moon
- Constant wear garment worn by astronaut Jim Lovell
- Flight garment worn by Ohio astronaut Terence T. Henricks on STS-70
- Replica pressure suit worn by Space Shuttle Program astronauts
- Soviet hydrosuit used in 1978 on Salyut 6
- Soviet flight suit used during Mir space station

=== Aerospace ===
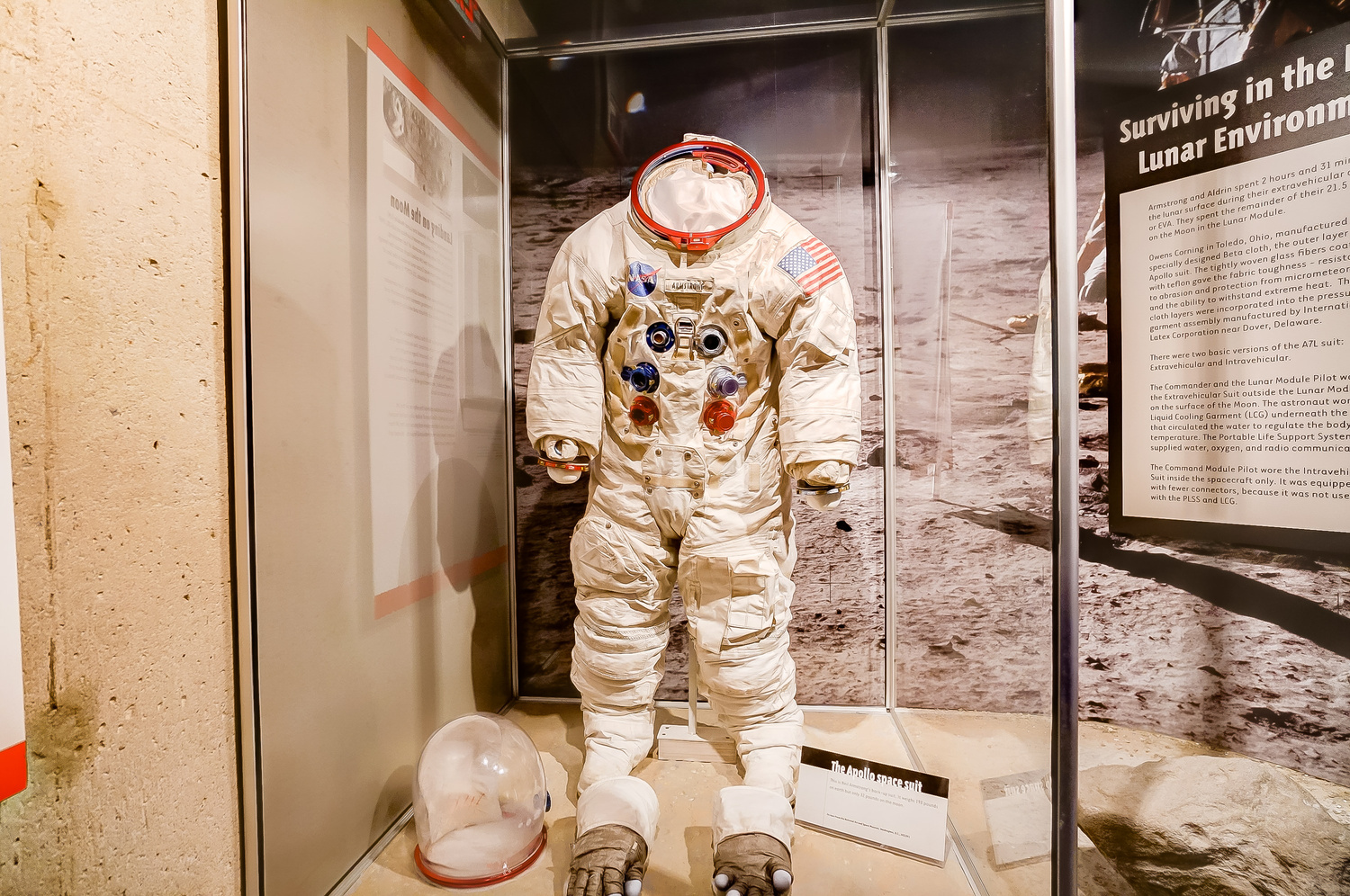
One of Neil Armstrong's Apollo A7L backup spacesuits

- United States flag taken on the Apollo 11 mission by Neil Armstrong
- Heel restraints on board the Command Module Columbia during Apollo 11 mission
- A lunar sample - the NASA term for a Moon rock
- Apollo 11 heat shield fragment
- A replica Sputnik I
- Early space food, hygiene equipment, and sleeping bags
- Personal items from Ohio astronaut Judith Resnik
- Shuttle tire from the Space Shuttle Endeavour.

== See also ==
- United States Astronaut Hall of Fame
