= Aviation Trail =

- Location within Ohio
- Established: 3 August 1981
- Founders: Mary Ann Johnson; Jerry Sharkey
- Type: Nonprofit
- Coordinates: 39.7560°N 84.2117°W
- Website: www.aviationtrailinc.org

The Aviation Trail is a non-profit organization and heritage trail located in Dayton, Ohio focused on Ohio aviation history.

== History ==
The Aviation Trail was founded by a group of individuals including Jerry Sharkey and Mary Ann Johnson on 3 August 1981. The organization acquired one of the Wright Brothers' bicycle shops located at 22 South Williams Street and the nearby Hoover Block, where they operated a print shop, in 1982. A booklet of 45 sites was published in 1986 and, following restoration, the bicycle shop opened to the public in 1988. After the Dayton Aviation Heritage National Historical Park was established in 1992, the Hoover Block was sold to the National Park Service and opened in 2003 as its visitors center.

== Exhibits ==
The organization also operates the Parachute Museum located on the second floor of the visitor center. The museum acquired two adjacent buildings in 2016 and announced plans for its expansion.

== Programs ==
The Aviation Trail provides a brochure with a list of 16 sites. Visiting 8 of the sites on the trail allows visitors to exchange their brochure for a "Wilbear Wright" teddy bear.

=== Sites ===
Number	Name
1a	Wright-Dunbar Interpretive Center and Aviation Trail Visitor Center
1b	Parachute Museum
1c	Wright Cycle Company
2	Paul Laurence Dunbar House
3a	Wright Brothers Memorial
3b	Huffman Prairie Flying Field Interpretive Center
3c	Huffman Prairie Flying Field
4	Carillon Historical Park
5	National Museum of the United States Air Force
6	National Aviation Hall of Fame
7	Hawthorn Hill
8	Woodland Cemetery and Arboretum
9	Wright "B" Flyer
10	Wright State University
11	WACO Air Museum
12	Armstrong Air & Space Museum
13	Champaign Aviation Museum
14	Grimes Flying Lab
15	Tri-State Warbird Museum
16	Butler County Warbirds

== See also ==
- Dayton Aviation Heritage National Historical Park
