= Daniel C. Cooper =

American politician

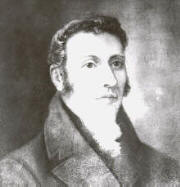
Daniel C. Cooper (1773-1818)

Daniel C. Cooper (November 21, 1773 — July 13, 1818) was an American surveyor, farmer, miller and political leader.

== Biography ==
He was born in the Passaic Valley at Long Hill, Morris County, New Jersey, the son of wealthy farmer George Cooper (20 August 1745 — 20 September 1801) and Margaret Lafferty. George’s father Daniel was born at sea on the voyage from Holland about 1695.

Educated as a surveyor, when Daniel C. Cooper was about twenty years old, he went west to Fort Washington near Cincinnati, Ohio to look after the interests of Jonathan Dayton, who owned lands and was otherwise interested in the "Symmes Purchase." This gave Cooper employment in his occupation as surveyor, and was also a favorable opportunity for observation and selection of lands for himself.

Judge John Cleves Symmes, a land speculator from New Jersey, initiated much of southwestern Ohio's settlement and in late 1795, he sold Arthur St. Clair, Governor of the Northwest Territory, General James Wilkinson, Israel Ludlow and New Jersey Congressman Jonathan Dayton the land that became known as the "Dayton Purchase." The four men paid $0.83 an acre for 60,000 acres (240 km²) at the confluence of the Great Miami and Mad rivers. Israel Ludlow named the village after his friend Jonathan Dayton, who ironically never set foot in the town. Ludlow also laid out the streets, which at four poles (66 ft) were wide enough to "turn a coach and four." Daniel Cooper headed the team that surveyed the land and laid out the town site in 1795.

In 1796, Dayton Township, a large area containing parts of current Montgomery, Greene, Miami, Clark, Champaign, Logan, and Shelby Counties, was formed. Daniel Cooper was appointed tax assessor. The highest tax assessed was Daniel Cooper's $6.25, which included the gristmill he operated.

In 1797, Daniel Cooper laid out the Mad River Road, the first overland connection between Cincinnati and Dayton. This opened up the "Mad River Country" at Dayton and the upper Miami Valley to settlement.

When Symmes later failed to meet his financial obligations to the federal government, Ludlow, St. Clair, Wilkinson, and Dayton waived their right to purchase the property from the government. In 1800, the United States Government offered to sell the property to the residents at the rate of $2.00 an acre, but this was far beyond the means of the inhabitants - and at a higher price than they had already paid Symmes. Some families left instead of paying the fee, and many potential settlers migrated to other locations. By the time the matter was settled in 1802, only five families resided in Dayton.

Daniel Cooper petitioned the United States Congress, describing the town's land-title plight: Would it be right, he asked, to dispossess these settlers after they had worked so hard clearing land and raising cabins? The government named Cooper proprietor of the town. He paid the federal asking price of $2 an acre purchasing more than 3,000 acres (12 km²) of the land, including the town site. He replatted the town using the original survey with minimal alterations. Clear titles were passed to the original settlers who were once again given an "inlot" within the city and an "outlot." When original owners left the property, new settlers were required to pay $2.00 an acre and $1.00 for the city lot.

In addition, Cooper donated properties for two churches to be built at Third and Main Streets, a cemetery on the block along Fifth Street between Ludlow and Wilkinson Streets, and the block known as Cooper Park bounded by Third, St. Clair, and Second Streets "to be an open walk forever." He also donated the land at Third and Main for a county courthouse to be built. The original two-story brick courthouse was replaced in 1850 by the limestone structure that rests there today.

Daniel Cooper had a 1,000 acre (4 km²) farm south of the town. He brought an African American female servant to his farm in 1802, the first African-American woman of record in the area. In the Population of Record, the woman was recorded as "Black Girl." While her name is not known, her children, Harry Cooper, born in 1803, and Polly Cooper, born in 1805, were documented. The children became indentured servants to Cooper until they were twenty-one and eighteen, respectively. Harry learned farming and milling while Polly trained in housekeeping. In 1803, Cooper resolved to marry and live in town. He sold his farm to Robert Patterson, a Revolutionary War veteran and founder of Lexington, Kentucky and grandfather of John H. Patterson, founder of the National Cash Register Company. The land was incorporated into Patterson’s farm, "Rubicon."

In 1803, Mr. Cooper married a woman in Cincinnati, whose maiden name was Sophia Greene (August 25, 1780 — May 11, 1826), the young widow of G. W. Burnet, a young lawyer of Cincinnati. Sophia was born in Rhode Island, the daughter of Charles Greene, a member of the Ohio Company who had removed to Marietta in 1788.

Daniel Cooper built his "elegant mansion" of hewn logs and lined with cherry planks on the southwest corner of Ludlow and First streets in Dayton, and there he lived with his family until his death. After Daniel Cooper's death, Mrs. Cooper married Gen. Fielding Lowry. Daniel and Sophia Cooper had six children, all of them dying in childhood except David Zeigler Cooper, who was born November 8, 1812, married Miss Letitia Smith in Philadelphia, and died in Dayton, December 4, 1836.

Cooper helped found the Dayton Academy, Dayton's first school to educate the boys of the town, by donating the land and bell in 1807. He operated a general store, and, when troops were stationed in Dayton during the War of 1812, organized the idle soldiers to build a levee at the turn of the Great Miami River to protect the village from flooding. From about 1805 and for many years, he operated gristmills, sawmills and a carding and fulling mill in Dayton. He donated the land for the Dayton Hydraulic, which became the waterpower source for early manufacturing in the town.

Daniel C. Cooper was politically active from the time he became Proprietor until his death. Cooper represented Montgomery County in the Third General Assembly of Ohio convened at Chillicothe the first Monday in December 1804. He was elected to the Sixth Assembly convened at Chillicothe December 7, 1807, was elected to the Ohio State Senate from the district composed of Miami, Montgomery and Preble Counties to the Seventh General Assembly, convened at Chillicothe December 5, 1808, and was re-elected Senator to the Eighth Assembly, convened at Chillicothe the first Monday in December 1809. In 1810, he was President of the Select Council of Dayton. As representative of the county, he was a member of the Twelfth Assembly, convened at Chillicothe December 6, 1813. He was Senator in the Fourteenth Assembly, convened at Chillicothe December 4, 1815, and was re elected to the Fifteenth General Assembly, convened at Columbus the then-new capital of the State December 2, 1816.

In May 1815, Daniel Cooper laid out the lots to the east of Dayton, including today’s Oregon District. He was appointed a Trustee of Miami University on February 15, 1815. In June 1818, Daniel Cooper and John Piatt, of Cincinnati, developed an overland freight line running between Cincinnati and Dayton with various stops. The first bell for the First Presbyterian Church arrived in Dayton in July 1818. Daniel Cooper loaded it on a wheelbarrow and wheeled it to the church. The exertion was too much for him; he ruptured a blood vessel and died July 13, 1818. He is buried in Woodland Cemetery, Dayton, Ohio.

Ohio House of Representatives
| New district | Representative from Montgomery County; 1804–1805 | Succeeded by William Robinson |
| Preceded by Philip Gunckel | Representative from Montgomery County; 1807–1808 | Succeeded by Philip Gunckel; Edmund Munger as Representatives from Montgomery and Preble Counties |
| Preceded by Benjamin Archer; Joseph Pierce | Representative from Montgomery County; 1813–1814; Served alongside: George Newcome | Succeeded by John H. Williams; Daniel Yount |
Ohio Senate
| New district | Senator from Montgomery, Miami, and Preble Counties; 1808–1810 | Succeeded by David Purviance |
| Preceded by George Newcome | Senator from Montgomery County; 1815–1817 | Succeeded by George Newcome |
