= Montgomery County Historical Society =

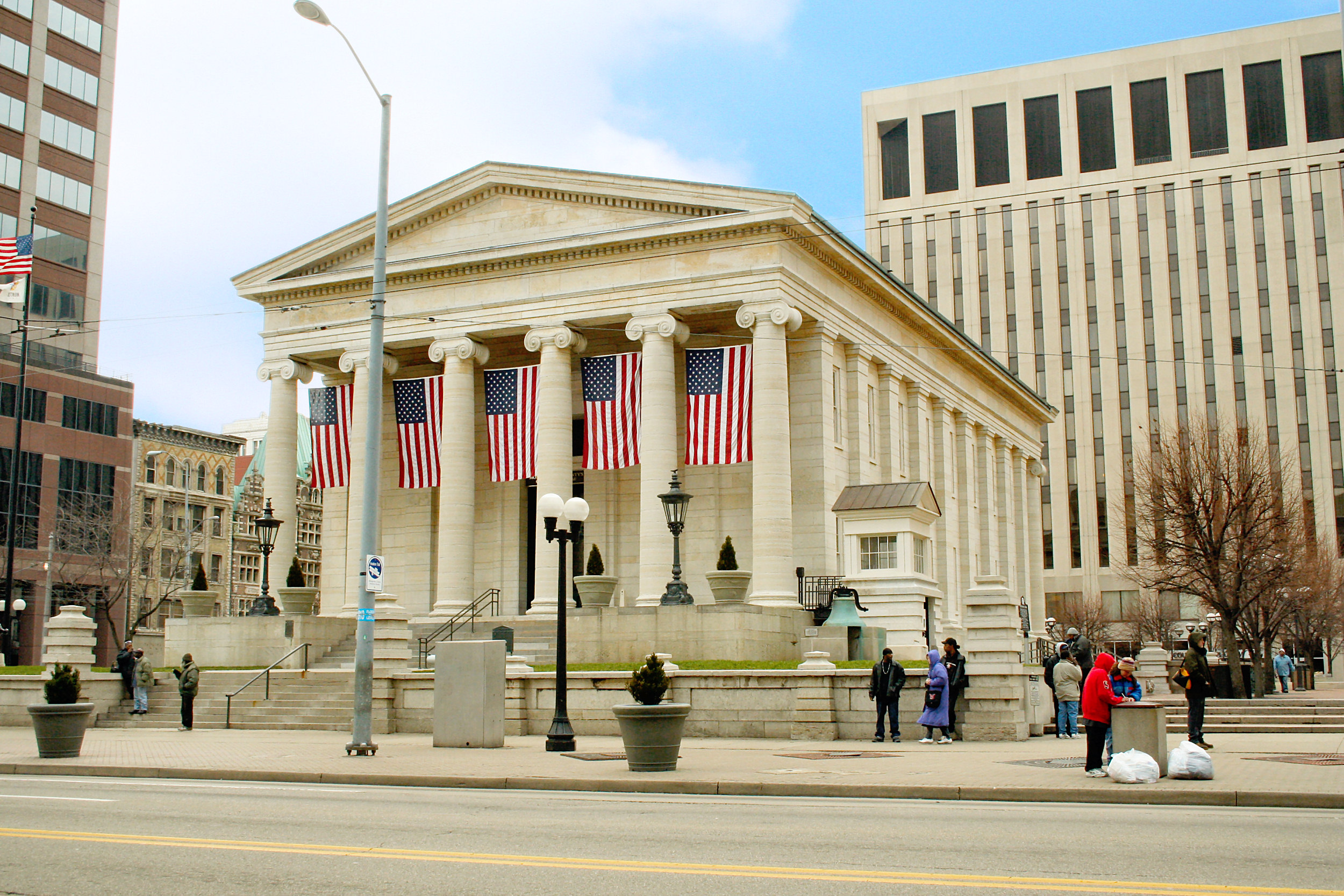
Old Greek Revival county courthouse in Dayton, Ohio, completed 1850.

The Montgomery County Historical Society, located in Dayton, Ohio, USA, was designated as official historian of Montgomery County, Ohio, and of the cultural heritage of Ohio's Miami Valley. In 2005, the Society merged with Dayton's Carillon Historical Park to form Dayton History.

In 1896, a group of citizens gathered at the Old Court House in Dayton, Ohio to create an organization dedicated to collecting and preserving the history of the Miami Valley. Their goal was to celebrate the city's centennial by saving and converting Newcom's Tavern, Dayton's oldest building (ca. 1796), into the community's first history museum. They called their organization the Dayton Historical Society. The society remained headquartered in Newcom's Tavern for seventy-five years. Newcom's Tavern is now located on the grounds of the Carillon Historical Park in Dayton.

In 1968, the society's volunteers took a leadership role in the preservation of another outstanding Dayton landmark, the 1850 Montgomery County Courthouse, the nation's best surviving example of a Greek Revival style courthouse. The Dayton Historical Society became The Montgomery County Historical Society and relocated to the Old Court House.

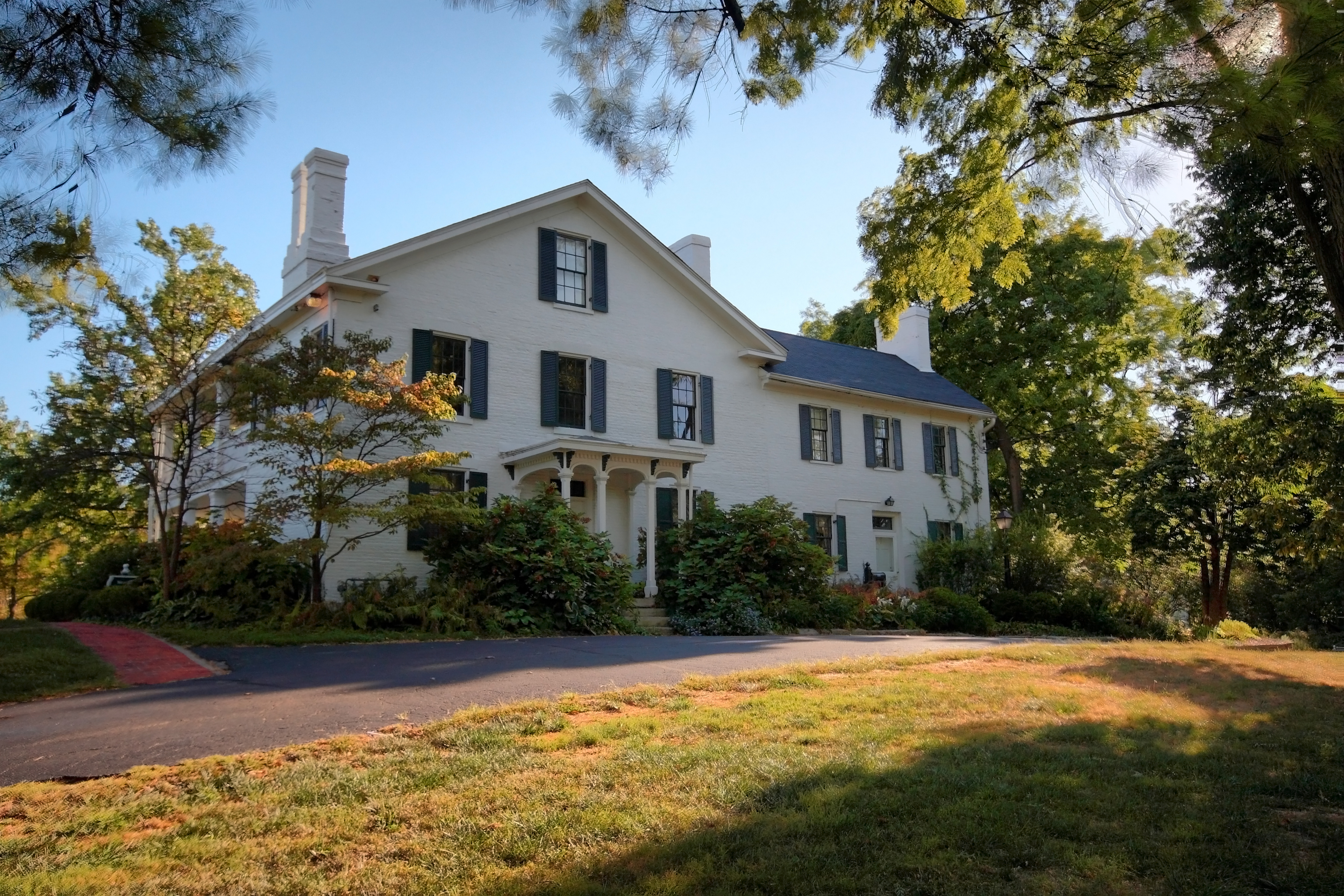
Patterson Homestead in Dayton, Ohio

In 1977, the City of Dayton asked the society to provide management and museum services for the 1816 Patterson Homestead (Rubicon Farm), home of Dayton's prominent Patterson family and birthplace of John H. Patterson, founder of the National Cash Register Company (now NCR Corporation). Today, the Patterson Homestead is used for educational programming on life in early Dayton.

In 1998, the society began management of the NCR Archive, a collection of over three million historic documents, photographs, and objects of local, national and international significance, making the society one of the largest historical organizations in the Midwest. The new Miami Valley History Research Center, featuring the NCR Archive, opened in Dayton in 2001.
