= Roy G. Fitzgerald =

American politician

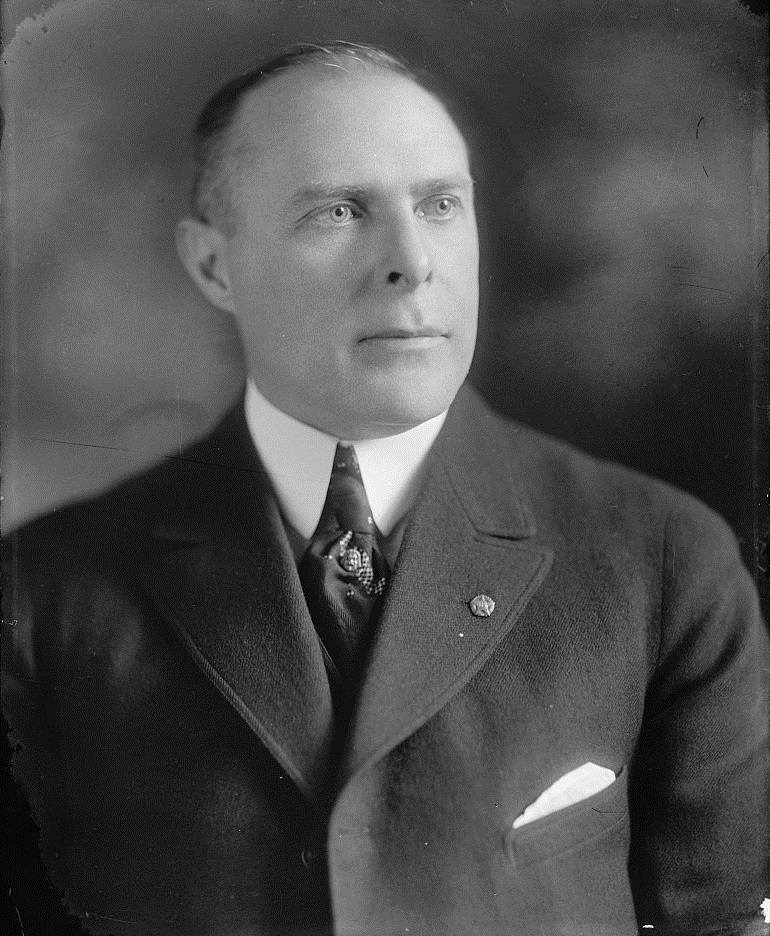

Member of the U.S. House of Representatives from Ohio's 3rd district
- In office March 4, 1921 – March 3, 1931
- Preceded by: Warren Gard
- Succeeded by: Byron B. Harlan

Personal details
- Born: Roy Gerald Fitzgerald; August 25, 1875 Watertown, New York
- Died: November 16, 1962 (aged 87) Dayton, Ohio
- Resting place: Woodland Cemetery, Dayton, Ohio
- Party: Republican
- Spouse(s): Caroline V. Wetecamp; Alverda J. Sinks
- Children: three

Military service
- Allegiance: United States
- Branch/service: U. S. Army
- Battles/wars: World War I

Roy Gerald Fitzgerald (August 25, 1875 – November 16, 1962) was an attorney, soldier, preservationist, and a member of the United States House of Representatives from Ohio, serving five terms from 1921 to 1931.

== Birth and early life ==
He was born in Watertown, New York, and moved to Dayton, Ohio, with his parents, Michael Gerald and Cornelia Maria (née Avery) Fitzgerald, in 1890 when his father's employer, the Davis Sewing Machine Company, was purchased by George P. Huffman and relocated from Watertown to Dayton.

He attended the public schools, read law in the office of John M. Sprigg and was admitted to the bar in 1896. He commenced practice in Dayton as a partner in the law firm of Sprigg & Fitzgerald that later became Fitzgerald & Sprigg.

== Personal life ==
In 1900, Fitzgerald married Caroline L. Wetecamp of Greenville, Ohio with whom he had two daughters and a son. Their son, Roy Jr., was a major in World War II, survived the Battle of the Bulge but died five months after VJ Day. Caroline Fitzgerald was a sickly woman, in the later years of her husband's Congressional service. She died in 1935. Fitzgerald married, secondly, to Alverda J. Sinks of Miami County, Ohio.

== Military service ==
During World War I, he enlisted in the Army and was later commissioned a captain of infantry and was the commanding officer of Headquarters Company, 329th Infantry Regiment, American Expeditionary Force in France. He was commissioned lieutenant colonel of Infantry, United States Army Reserve Corps, in 1928.

== Congressional service ==
Fitzgerald was elected as a Republican from Ohio's Third District to the Sixty-seventh Congress and to the four succeeding Congresses. He was chairman of the Committee on Expenditures in the Department of Commerce in the Sixty-eighth Congress. He served on the Committee on Revision of the Laws in the Seventieth and Seventy-first Congresses, during which time he authored a cumulative codification system for statutory law of the United States and the District of Columbia. He was defeated for reelection in 1930 to the Seventy-second Congress.

During his decade in Congress, Fitzgerald fought for a number of causes that dismayed his more conservative colleagues, including child labor laws, reorganization of the U.S. Army Air Corps as an independent body and Federal care of the needy aged. The latter anticipated Social Security.

In 1922, Fitzgerald introduced a constitutional amendment to allow Congress to control the labor and working hours of children under 18 which was passed by Congress in 1924. By 1938, only 28 states had ratified it when Congress passed the Fair Labor Standards Act (29 U.S. Code Chapter 8), incorporating many of the child labor provisions of the amendment.

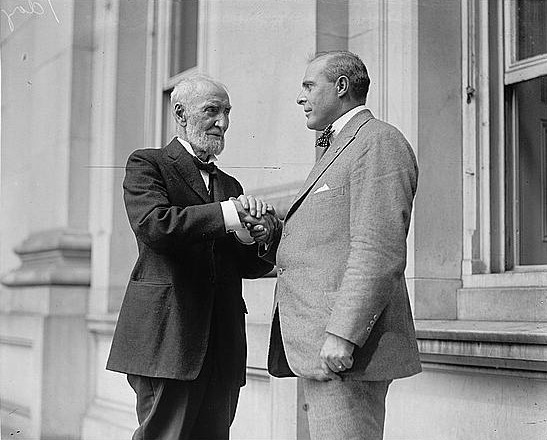
Joseph Gurney Cannon (left) and Roy G. Fitzgerald (right)

== Fitzgerald and flight ==
A licensed pilot and early advocate of flying, Fitzgerald was acquainted with Wright brothers. Rep. Fitzgerald was called an "aerial daredevil" of Congress by The New York Times for flying the 500-odd miles from Dayton to Washington for the reconvening of the lame duck session of Congress in 1922 (though that flight was piloted by someone else). In Dayton, he secured the location of Wright Field (now part of Wright-Patterson Air Force Base). His interest in flying led him, in 1927, to urge that the Air Force be reorganized as an independent department of the national defense. "The recent oceanic flights", he said at the time, "coupled with the preliminary tests of heavy bombing planes, have startled the world with the tremendous power of aviation. Aircraft have generally appeared to be the cheapest instruments of defense. Now they prove themselves to be one of the most powerful."

== Later life ==
After his Congressional service, he resumed the independent practice of law in Dayton, with partners Thomas H. Ford, and Wayne F. Lee.

From 1927 to 1930, he was a delegate to the Carnegie Foundation's Inter-Parliamentary Union at Paris, Berlin, Geneva, and London to study methods of classifying international law.

An active man, Roy Fitzgerald climbed Mount Rainier in 1925 and four years later swam the Bosphorus from Europe to Asia in a cold rain. The swim took him 30 minutes.

In June 1934, Congressman Fitzgerald purchased a Dayton-area farm from Frederick B. Patterson, president of National Cash Register Corp. The farm was 133 acres (0.54 km^{2}) located on Rural Road 11, one and a half miles south of Alexandersville, and three miles (5 km) east of Miamisburg.

Fitzgerald was a director of the Merchants National Bank & Trust Company in Dayton for more than 50 years, and president of the Montgomery County Historical Society for 22 years. Although he was not a Dayton native, he enthusiastically led in helping to preserve many Dayton landmarks, notably Newcom Tavern and the Old Court House. During his presidency, a six million dollar bond was issued to build a new Court House with the condition that the Old Court House building be kept intact. The Court House later became the headquarters of the Historical Society. He oversaw the conservation of the Tavern and began deliberations about its relocation to Carillon Historical Park.

Roy Gerald Fitzgerald died in Dayton in 1962 after a long illness and is interred with his family at Woodland Cemetery, Dayton, Ohio.

== Primary sources ==
- "Roy Fitzgerald, Legislator, Dies." New York Times, 17 November 1962, page 25.
- Bambakidis, Elli. Dayton Collection, Manuscripts Section Dayton & Montgomery County Public Library. Box 4: Newcom Tavern - Old Court House - Correspondence 1921-1958, Legal documents 1933-1954, Record of relics 1902-1942, Newspaper clippings 1894-1969, Financial statement 1933-1956, and miscellaneous material. Inventory compiled 1994.
- Roy G. Fitzgerald Collection (MS-008). Dayton Metro Library, Dayton, Ohio. "View online finding aid".

U.S. House of Representatives
Preceded by Warren Gard	U.S. Representative from Ohio's 3rd district 1921 - 1931	Succeeded by Byron B. Harlan
