= Dayton Aviation Heritage National Historical Park =

National Historical Park of the United States

- U.S. National Register of Historic Places
- U.S. National Historical Park
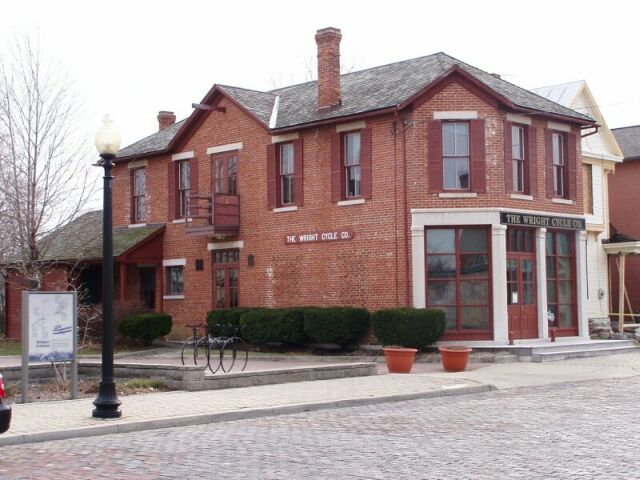
- Wright Brothers Fourth Bicycle Shop, Dayton, Ohio

- Location within Ohio Location within the United States
- Location: Montgomery and Greene counties, Ohio, U.S.
- Nearest city: Dayton, Ohio
- Coordinates: 39°47′41″N 84°05′20″W
- Area: 86 acres (35 ha)
- Visitation: 79,760 (2025)
- Website: www.nps.gov/daav
- NRHP reference No.: 01000227

Significant dates
- Added to NRHP: September 8, 1988
- Designated NHP: October 16, 1992

Dayton Aviation Heritage National Historical Park is a United States National Historical Park in Dayton, Ohio, that commemorates three important historical figures—Wilbur Wright, Orville Wright, and poet Paul Laurence Dunbar—and their work in the Miami Valley.

== Park history ==
The idea for the present-day Dayton Aviation Heritage National Historical Park was first conceived by Jerry Sharkey. Much of the Dayton neighborhood where Orville and Wilbur Wright had lived and worked had already been destroyed by the 1970s. Neglect, riots during the 1960s, and a highway project through the city had leveled much of the neighborhood. Decades earlier, Henry Ford had also relocated one of the Wrights' bicycle shops from Dayton to its present location in Greenfield Village, Michigan, for display.

Sharkey's quest to preserve the Wright brothers' legacy began when he purchased their last surviving bicycle shop in Dayton for just $10,000, which saved the building from demolition. He also founded the Aviation Trail Inc., a nonprofit group dedicated to the creation of a potential national park or historic district encompassing the Wright brothers' buildings. Sharkey enlisted the help of local political and media figures to lobby for the creation of the park. Notable figures who supported its creation included the descendants of the Wright brothers, aviation historian Tom Crouch, U.S. District Judge Walter H. Rice, then-U.S. Rep. Dave Hobson, Dayton Daily News publisher Brad Tillson, and Michael Gessel, an aide to former U.S. Rep. Tony P. Hall. The group lobbied federal officials and the National Park Service to incorporate the landmarks related to the Wright brothers, which are scattered throughout the city, into a new historic trail.

The U.S. Congress passed legislation to establish the new park. In 1992, President George H. W. Bush signed the bill which created the Dayton Aviation Heritage National Historical Park into law. In addition to the Wright brothers' sites, the new park also preserved the home of Paul Laurence Dunbar, an acclaimed African-American poet and friend of the Wright brothers. Jerry Sharkey donated the Wright brothers' bicycle shop, which he had saved from demolition, to the National Park Service as part of the agreement to create the park.

A new visitor center was constructed in 2003 in time for the centennial of the Wright brothers' first flight. Jerry Sharkey, who had first conceived of the future historic park, died in April 2014.

== Biographical backgrounds ==
=== The Wright Brothers ===
Through the invention of powered flight, Wilbur and Orville Wright made significant contributions to human history. In their Dayton, Ohio, bicycle shops, the Wright brothers, who self-trained in the science and art of aviation, researched and built the world's first power-driven, heavier-than-air machine capable of free, controlled, and sustained flight. The Wrights also perfected their invention during 1904 and 1905 at the Huffman Prairie Flying Field near their hometown of Dayton.

=== Paul Laurence Dunbar ===
Paul Laurence Dunbar achieved national and international acclaim in a literary world that was almost exclusively reserved for whites, producing a body of work that included novels, plays, short stories, lyrics, and over 400 published poems. His work, which reflected much of the African American experience in the United States, contributed to a growing social consciousness and cultural identity for African Americans. Although he died in 1906, his writings contributed to later developments in African American history, such as the Harlem Renaissance and the early Civil Rights Movement. He was a neighbor and lifelong friend of Wilbur and Orville Wright.

== Landmarks ==
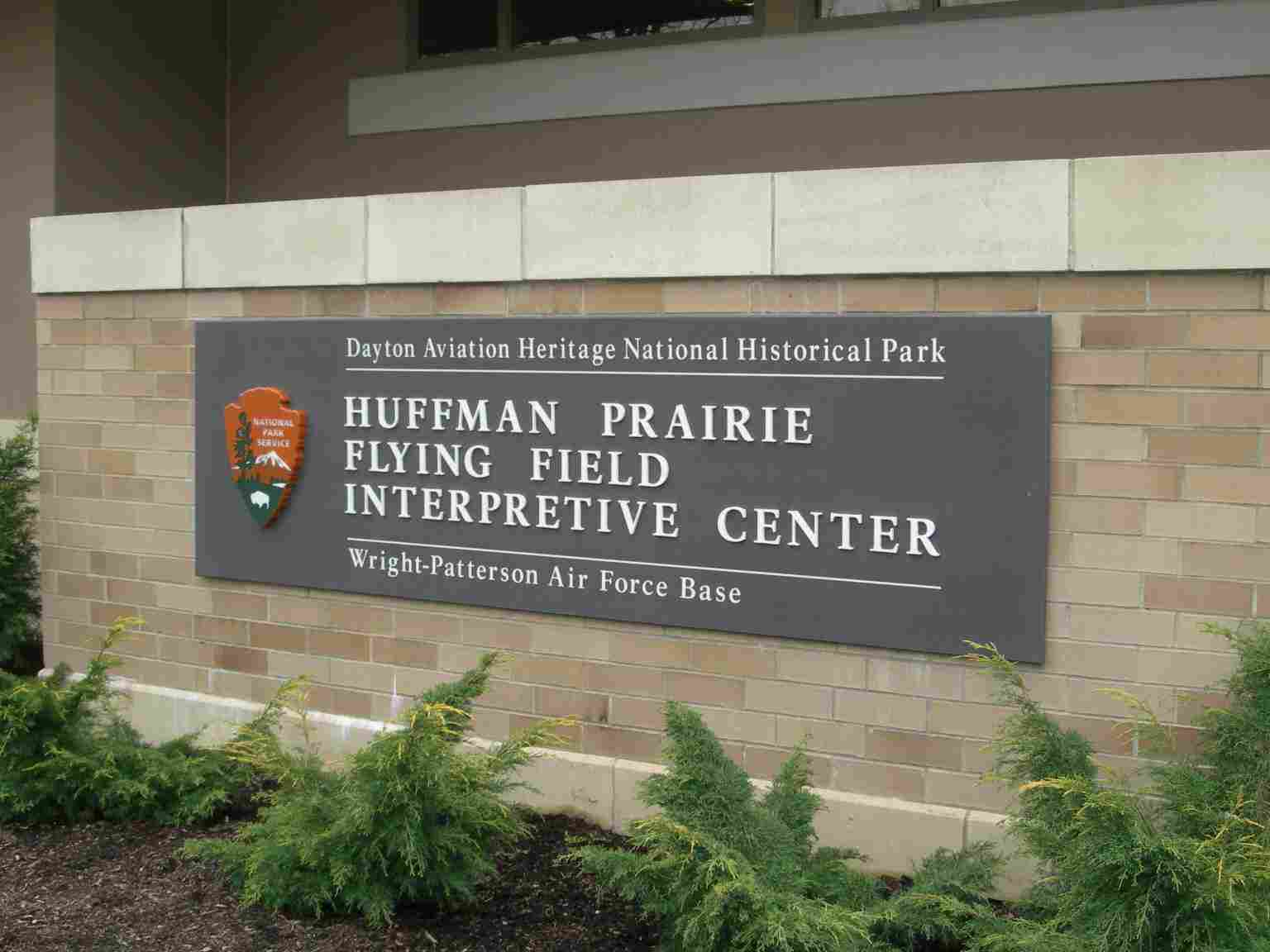
Sign for the Huffman Prairie Flying Field Interpretive Center at the Wright Memorial

The park is a cooperative effort between the National Park Service and several partners. The sites are:

- The Wright Cycle Company Complex in Dayton, which includes the Wright Cycle Company building, the Wright-Dunbar Interpretive Center and the Aviation Trail Visitor Center and Museum
- Huffman Prairie Flying Field and the Huffman Prairie Flying Field Interpretive Center, both located within Wright-Patterson Air Force Base just northeast of Dayton in Fairborn, Ohio, but operated by the National Park Service and open to the public.
- Wright Company factory, opened in 1910 as the first airplane factory and school
- The Wright Brothers Aviation Center at Carillon Historical Park in Dayton, operated by Dayton History
- The Paul Laurence Dunbar State Memorial in Dayton, operated by Dayton History on behalf of Ohio History Connection
- Hawthorn Hill, the 1914-1948 residence of Orville Wright, located just south of Dayton in Oakwood, Ohio.

Dayton Aviation Heritage National Historical Park is located within the National Aviation Heritage Area, an eight-county region in Ohio established as a National Heritage Area by Congress in 2004. The U.S. Department of the Interior listed three units of the park (Huffman Prairie Flying Field, Wright Hall and the 1905 Wright Flyer, and the Wright Cycle Company and Wright and Wright Printing building) on the 2008 U.S. World Heritage Tentative List as part of the Dayton Aviation Sites listing. The park is a central component of the National Aviation Heritage Area.

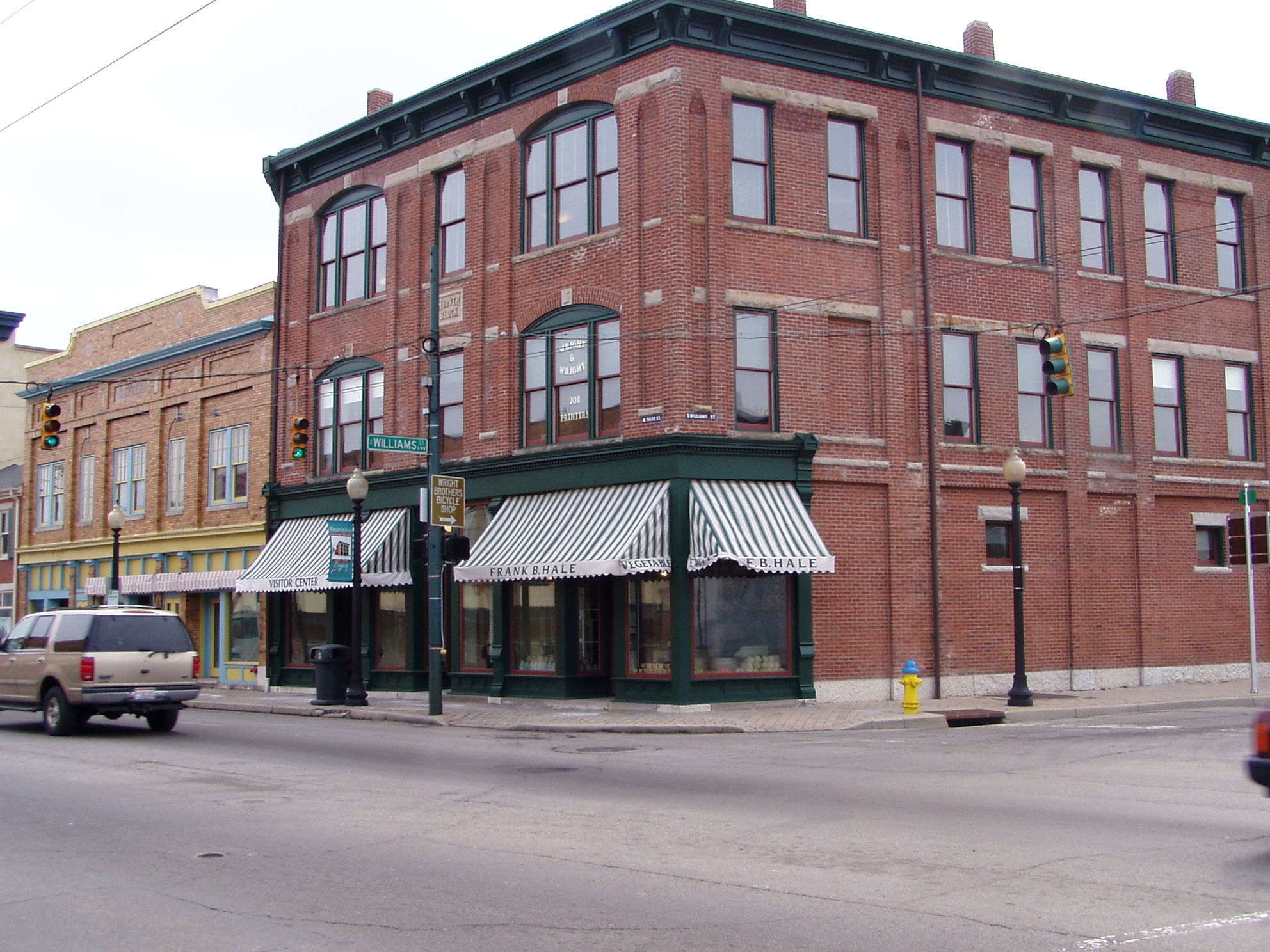
Hoover Block, where the Wright Brothers had their printing shop.

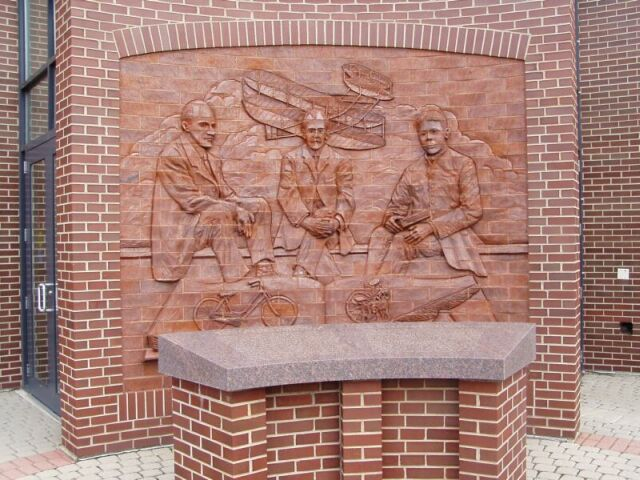
Entry frieze to Dayton Aviation Heritage National Historical Park visitor center.

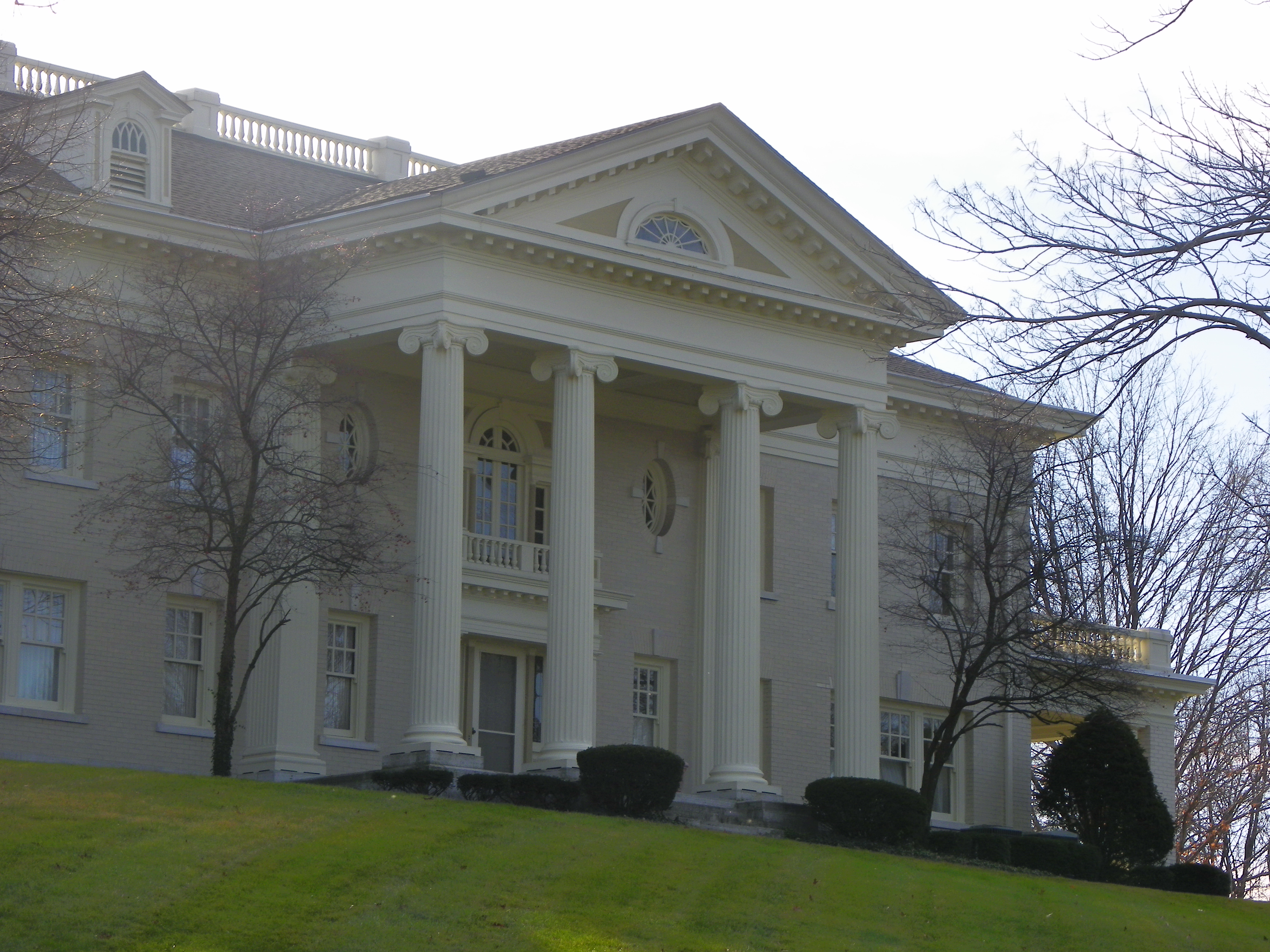
Hawthorn Hill, Orville Wright's home in Oakwood, Ohio

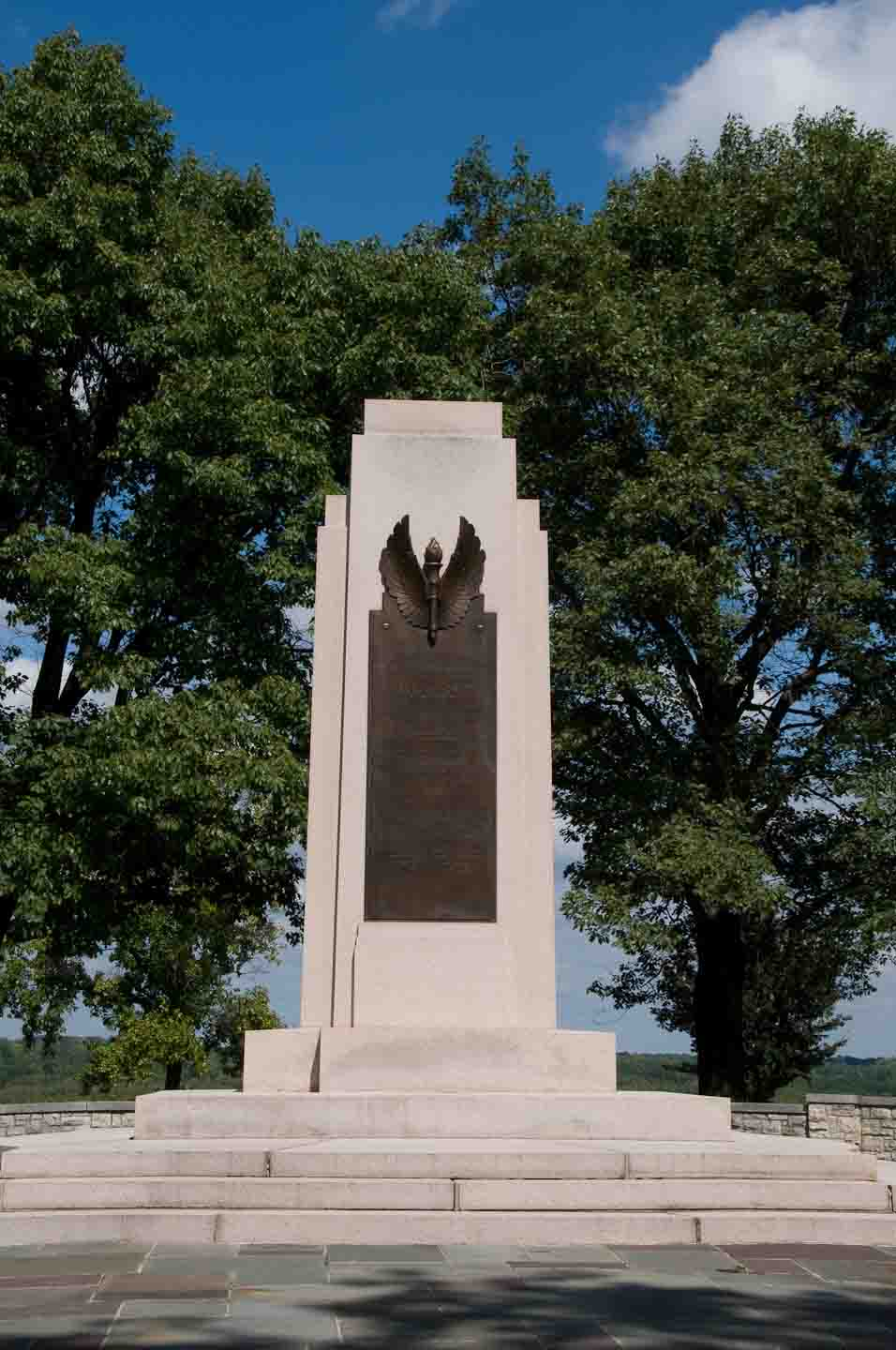
Wright Memorial, on a hill overlooking Huffman Prairie, by the Huffman Prairie Flying Field Interpretive Center

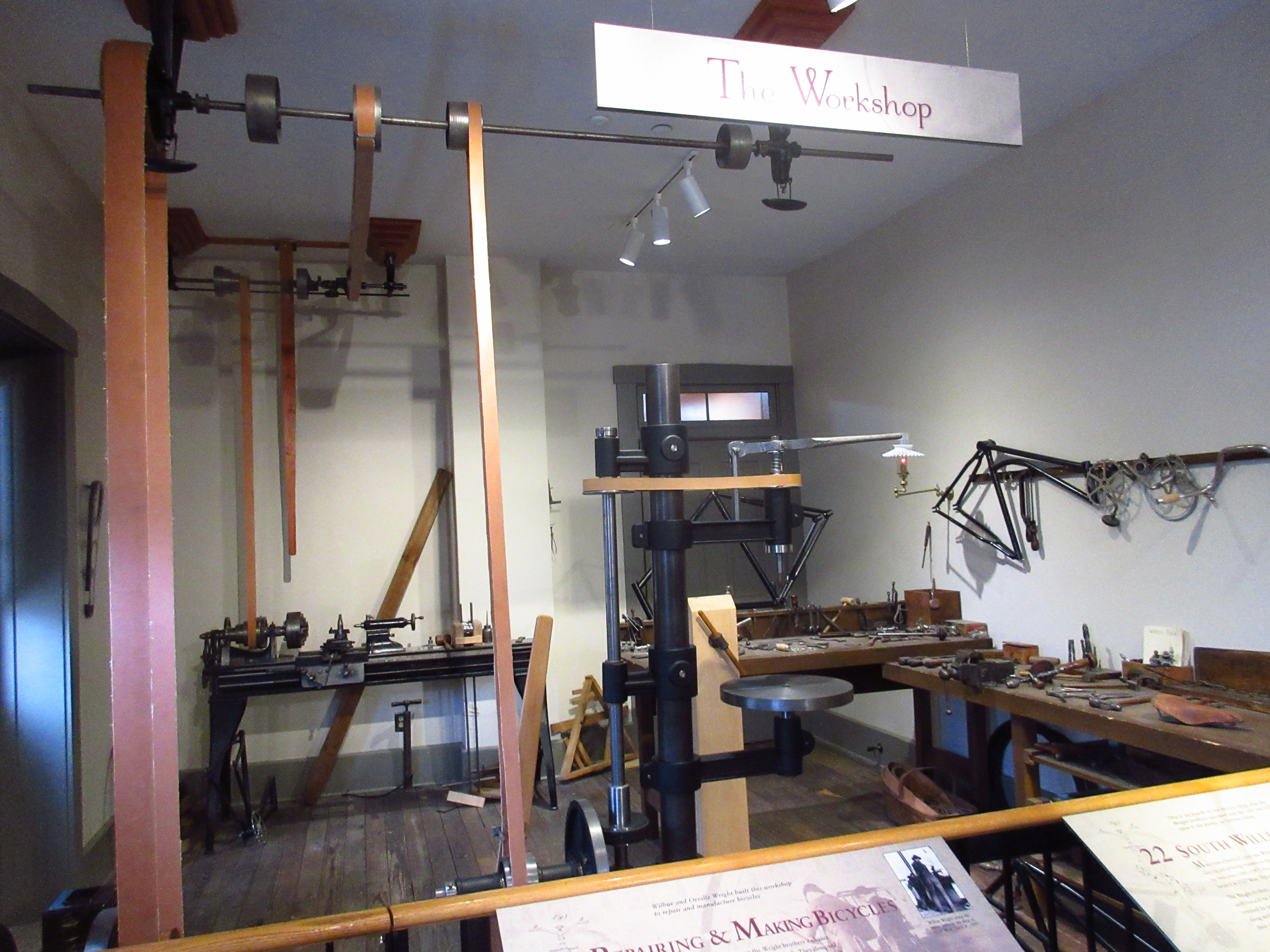
Recreated workshop from the Wright Bicycle Shop where the brothers conducted research into aviation.

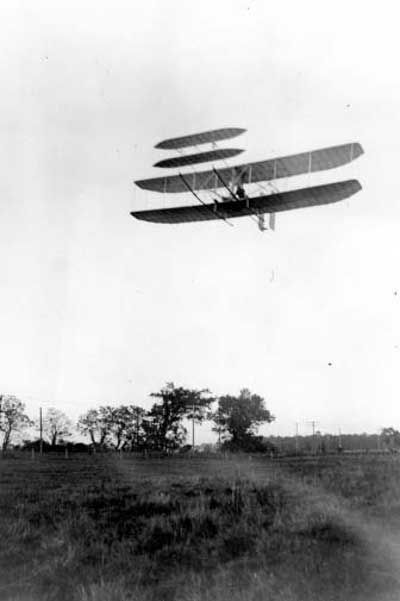
The Wright Flyer III, now in Carillon Historical Park, shown being flown by Orville Wright on October 4, 1905, over Huffman Prairie near Dayton

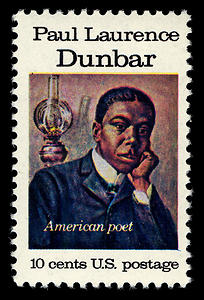
Dunbar on 1975 U.S. postage stamp

== See also ==
- Aviation Trail
- Wright Brothers National Memorial in Kitty Hawk, North Carolina
- National Register of Historic Places listings in Dayton, Ohio
