= Congressman Fitzgerald =

Congressman Fitzgerald may refer to:

- Roy Gerald Fitzgerald (1875–1962)
- John Joseph Fitzgerald
