= Westminster Presbyterian Church (Dayton) =

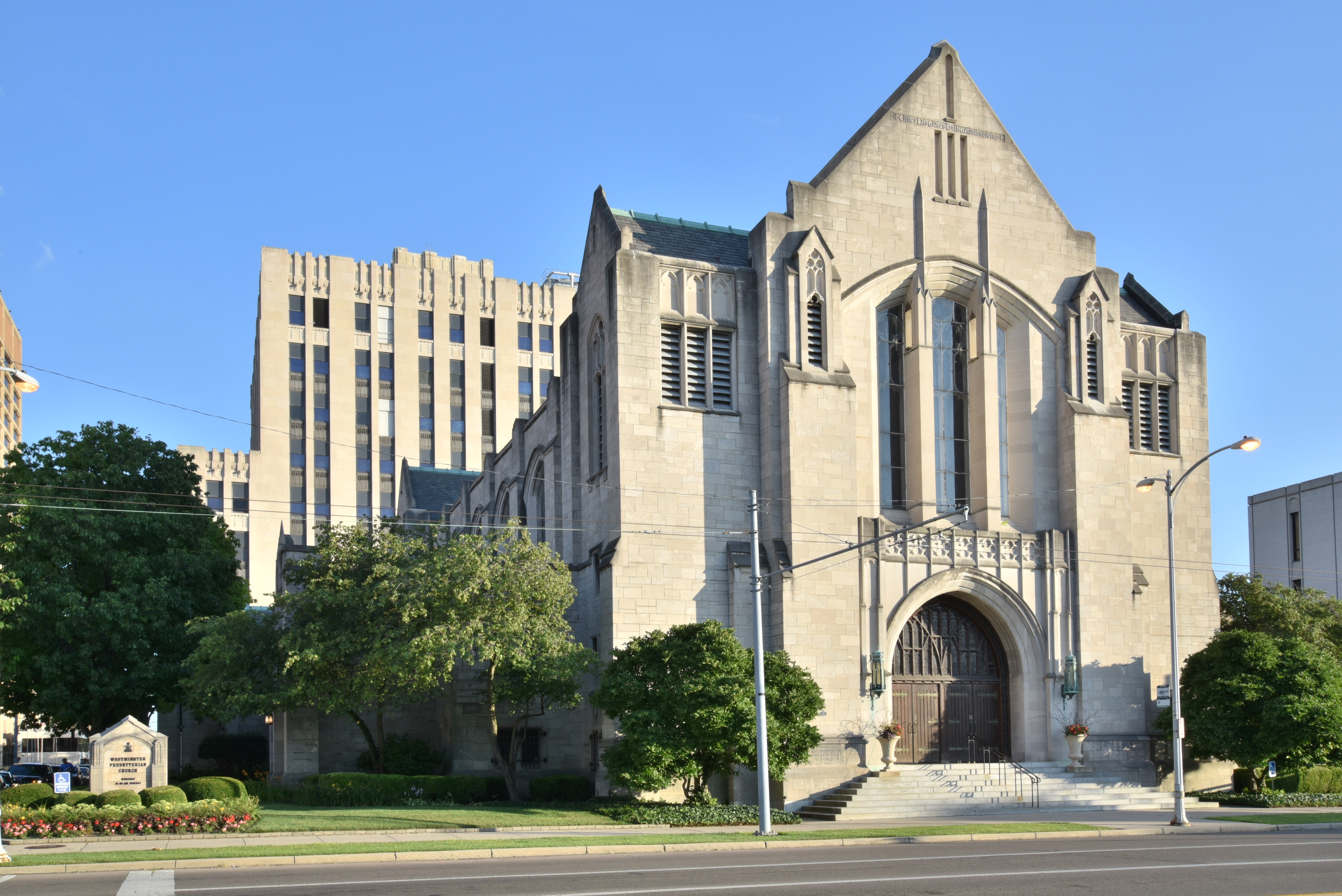
- View from northeast
- Westminster Presbyterian Church
- 39°45′41″N 84°11′47″W
- Country: United States
- Denomination: Presbyterian- PC(USA)

History
- Founded: 1799

Architecture
- Heritage designation: NRHP, 2021
- Architect: Ralph Adams Cram
- Style: Neo-Gothic
- Completed: 1926

Westminster Presbyterian Church is a congregation and building in Dayton, Ohio. The 1926 building was designed by Ralph Adams Cram and was added to the National Register of Historic Places in 2021. The congregation was established in 1799 and was the first church formed in Dayton. Today the congregation boasts over 1000 members and holds regular services each Sunday along with many additional musical and religious events throughout the year.

== Congregation ==
Dayton, Ohio, was first settled shortly after the 1795 Treaty of Greenville by a small group who travelled ten days from Cincinnati. In 1798 a member of the Transylvania Presbytery of the Presbyterian Church, William Robinson, came to Dayton to establish a church. In 1799 the congregation was established as the First Presbyterian Church under the Washington Presbytery of the Synod of Kentucky and met in Newcom Tavern, which at the time also served as the settlement's courthouse, jail, post office, and general store. Services were held in Newcom Tavern for three years until 1799, when a blockhouse was built, after which services were held in the blockhouse.

In 1800 a log cabin was built at the northeast corner of 3rd and Main to house the congregation and named First Presbyterian. The congregation donated $412 toward construction of a courthouse with the understanding that church services would be held in the courthouse. By 1806 the courthouse was built and services were held there. In 1817 a dedicated church building was completed at 2nd Street and Ludlow. The church bell was delivered in a wheelbarrow by congregant Daniel Cooper, who ruptured a blood vessel while delivering the bell and died.

In the 1830s the Presbyterian Church nationally experienced a schism over its approach to the institution of slavery, and the Dayton congregation split into two churches. The "New School" proponents, those who wanted the Presbyterian church to oppose slavery, left First Presbyterian and formed a new church, the Third Street Presbyterian Church, which was built at 3rd Street and Ludlow. In 1919 the two churches merged into one and chose the name Westminster Presbyterian, with E. W. Clippinger, who had been minister at the Third Street church, leading the congregation. In 1923 he was succeeded by Hugh Ivan Evans, the building was sold, plans were put in place to build a new church, and services moved to Memorial Hall, from where they were nationally broadcast. In 1926 the new building was opened.

== Building ==
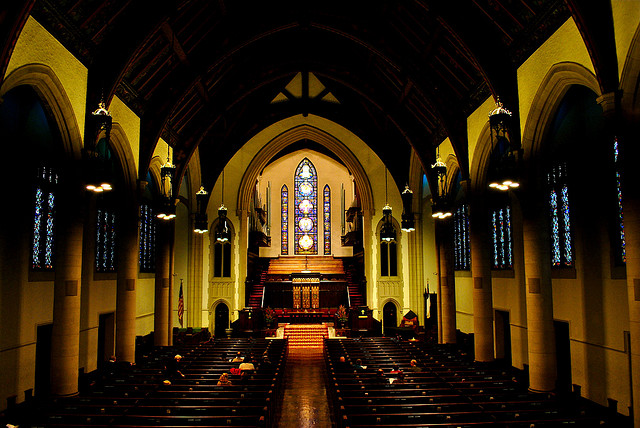
Interior

The 1926 building was designed by Ralph Adams Cram. A commenter writing in the Oakland Tribune called the interior exceptional for its "sense of intimacy and sheer eloquent beauty."

=== Casavant Frères Organ (Opus 2670) ===
The Casavant Organ (Opus 2670) was dedicated in January 1963. The organ replaced an original organ installed during the 1924 construction of the church's building that was in need of extensive repairs. It is one of the largest Casavant organs in world and among the largest pipe organs in the United States.

== Notable people ==
- Phineas Gurley (pastor 1849-1854)
