= Paul Laurence Dunbar House =

Historic house in Ohio, United States

- U.S. National Register of Historic Places
- U.S. National Historic Landmark
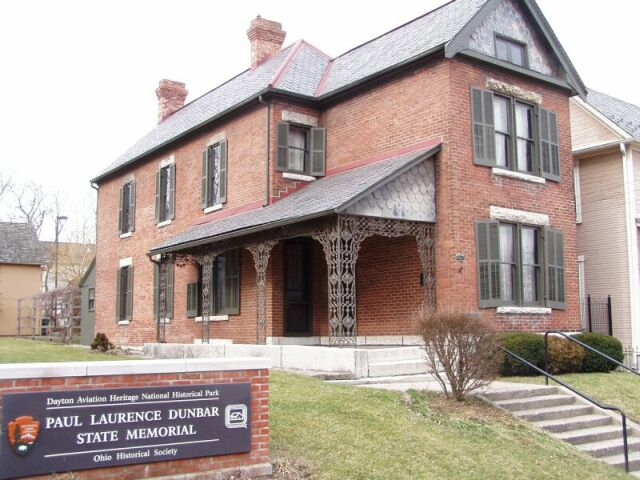
- Paul Laurence Dunbar Home

- Location within Ohio Location within the United States
- Location: 219 Paul Laurence Dunbar Street, Dayton, Ohio
- Coordinates: 39°45′27.6″N 84°13′8.2″W
- Built: 1894
- NRHP reference No.: 66000619

Significant dates
- Added to NRHP: October 15, 1966
- Designated NHL: December 29, 1962

The Paul Laurence Dunbar House was the 1904–1906 home of poet Paul Laurence Dunbar in Dayton, Ohio. It is a historic house museum owned by the state of Ohio and operated by Dayton History on behalf of the Ohio History Connection; it is also part of Dayton Aviation Heritage National Historical Park. It is located at 219 Paul Laurence Dunbar Street (formerly called North Summit Street) in Dayton.

== History ==
Dunbar had a long association with Dayton. He was born there in 1872, the son of former slaves, and his first poems were printed in the Dayton Herald in 1888. His first book, Oak and Ivy (1892) was published in Dayton by the United Brethren Publishing House as well.

After serving as an elevator operator in Dayton and meeting some success for his writings, Dunbar took a job in Washington, D.C., at the Library of Congress.

Dunbar purchased the home for his mother, Matilda Dunbar, in June 1904. The house is an eight-room brick structure on a quiet street. When Dunbar separated from his wife Alice Ruth Moore in 1902, he moved in as well.

By the time Dunbar moved into the house, he was sick with tuberculosis and struggling with alcoholism. It was in this home that Dunbar died in 1906. His death that February was signified by a black wreath which hung on the front door of the home.

After Dunbar's death, his mother Matilda lived here for the remainder of her life and kept his books, manuscripts, and study as he left them. In 1932, it was reported that Matilda held an open house every year on June 27, the anniversary of her son's birth. She died on February 24, 1934.

== Modern history ==
The home was purchased by the state of Ohio in 1936; that same year it was dedicated as the first state memorial to an African-American. It was declared a National Historic Landmark in 1962 and became part of Dayton Aviation Heritage National Historical Park in 1992. It is a component of the National Aviation Heritage Area.

A visitors center includes displays memorabilia relating to Dunbar's life and work. The visitors center is housed in a neighboring building. The property includes an old barn.

== See also ==
- National Register of Historic Places listings in Dayton, Ohio
