= Waco 9 =

1925 American biplane

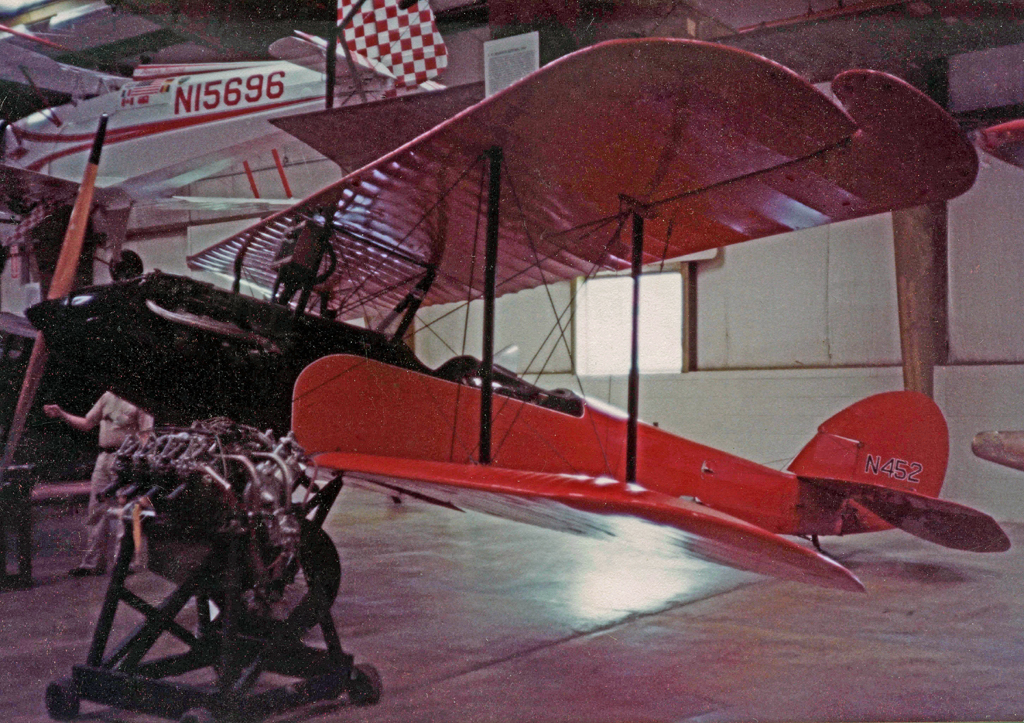
- Waco 9 of 1925 exhibited in 1982 at the NASM storage and restoration facility at Silver Hill, Maryland in the outskirts of Washington DC.

General information
- Type: three seat open cockpit biplane
- National origin: United States
- Manufacturer: Advance Aircraft Company
- Status: about 10 survivors in 2007
- Primary user: barnstorming
- Number built: about 270

History
- First flight: 1925

The Waco 9 is an American-built three-seat biplane design that first flew in 1925.

== Development ==
The Waco 9 was the first of the steel-tubed fuselage aircraft designs to be built by the Advance Aircraft Company, which became the Waco Aircraft Company circa 1929. The Model 9 was a three-seat open cockpit biplane with the ailerons on the upper wings extending outboard of the main wing surfaces.

About 270 Model 9 aircraft were built during 1925 and 1926.

== Operational history ==
The Model 9 was of rugged construction to meet the barnstorming requirements of the period. The cost when new was between $2,025 and $2,500. A Waco 9 was flown in the 1926 Ford National Reliability Air Tour.

The Model 9 was the first aircraft type to be fitted with aluminum floats (by the EDO Corporation in 1928). By 2007, a few examples remained airworthy in the US and five aircraft were held by museums.

== Variants ==
Model 9s were fitted with a variety of engines including the 90 hp (67 kW) Curtiss OX-5, the 100 hp (75 kW) Curtiss OXX-6, 100 hp (75 kW) Curtiss C-6 and the 150 hp (112 kW) Wright-Hisso A. Fitment of the various engines did not change the model number.

== Aircraft on display ==
A Waco 9, C116, "Miss McKeesport" is a part of the Ohio History Connection permanent collection. The airplane is currently on loan to the WACO Air Museum in Troy, Ohio. The airplane was constructed in 1927 and restored in 1985. It still retains its original Curtiss OX-5 engine.

A Waco 9, C218, is on display at the Western Antique Aeroplane & Automobile Museum located in Hood River, Oregon. It is displayed in the Pacific Air Transport Air Mail livery.

== Specifications (Model 9 with Curtiss OX-5 engine) ==
Data from U.S. Civil Aircraft Vol. I

General characteristics

- Crew: 1
- Capacity: 2 passengers
- Length: 23 ft 3 in (7.09 m)
- Wingspan: 31 ft 7 in (9.63 m)
- Height: 9 ft 3 in (2.82 m)
- Wing area: 290 sq ft (27 m^{2})
- Empty weight: 1,320 lb (599 kg)
- Gross weight: 2,100 lb (953 kg)
- Fuel capacity: 37 US gal (31 imp gal; 140 L)
- Powerplant: 1 × Curtiss OX-5 liquid-cooled V8 engine, 90 hp (67 kW)

Performance

- Maximum speed: 92 mph (148 km/h, 80 kn)
- Cruise speed: 79 mph (127 km/h, 69 kn)
- Stall speed: 35 mph (56 km/h, 30 kn) (landing speed)
- Range: 375 mi (604 km, 326 nmi)
- Service ceiling: 12,000 ft (3,700 m)
- Rate of climb: 500 ft/min (2.5 m/s)
