= Xenia (automobile) =

Defunct American motor vehicle manufacturer

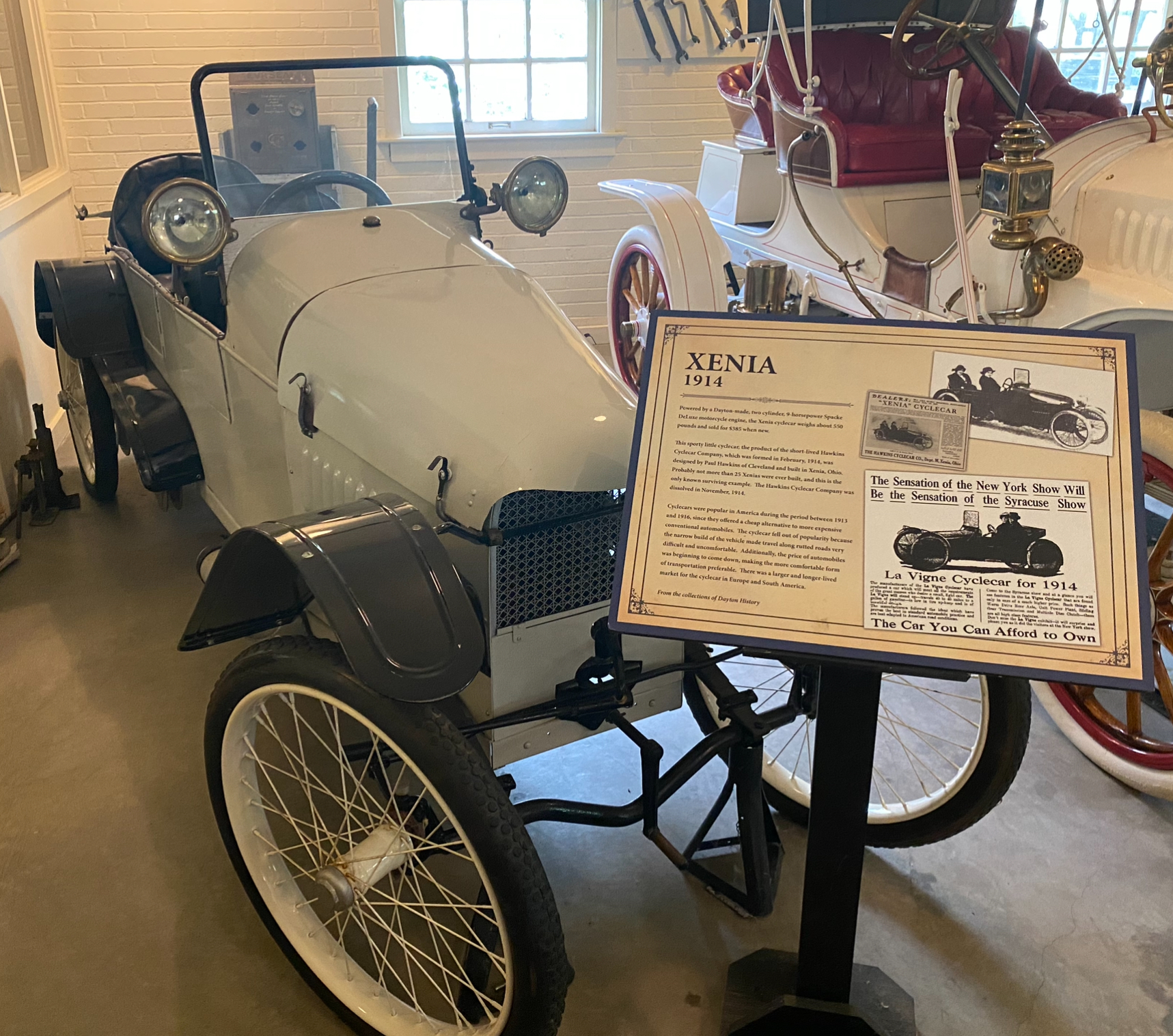
Xenia Cyclecar at Carillon Historical Park in Dayton, Ohio (2023)

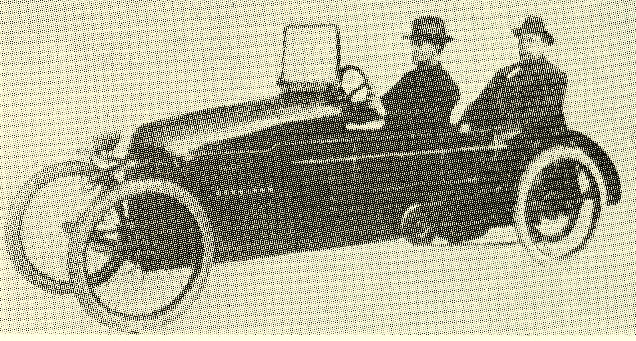
1914 Xenia

The Xenia was an American cyclecar designed by P. E. Hawkins of Cleveland and manufactured in Xenia, Ohio in 1914. The factory was Fred Baldner's machine shop, in which Baldner manufactured his own car from 1900 to 1903.

The Model 14A was built with the odd combination of an epicyclic gearbox and belt final drive, and was powered by an 1164 cc vee-twin Deluxe engine. The body seated two passengers in a tandem arrangement, and the car sold for $395. A Xenia was driven from Ohio all the way to San Francisco without problems, while another Xenia finished first in the cyclecar races held in Columbus, Ohio in August 1914.

The Hawkins Cyclecar Company went out of business in October 1914, with total production of the Xenia being approximately 25 cars.
