= Warren Gard =

American politician (1873–1929)

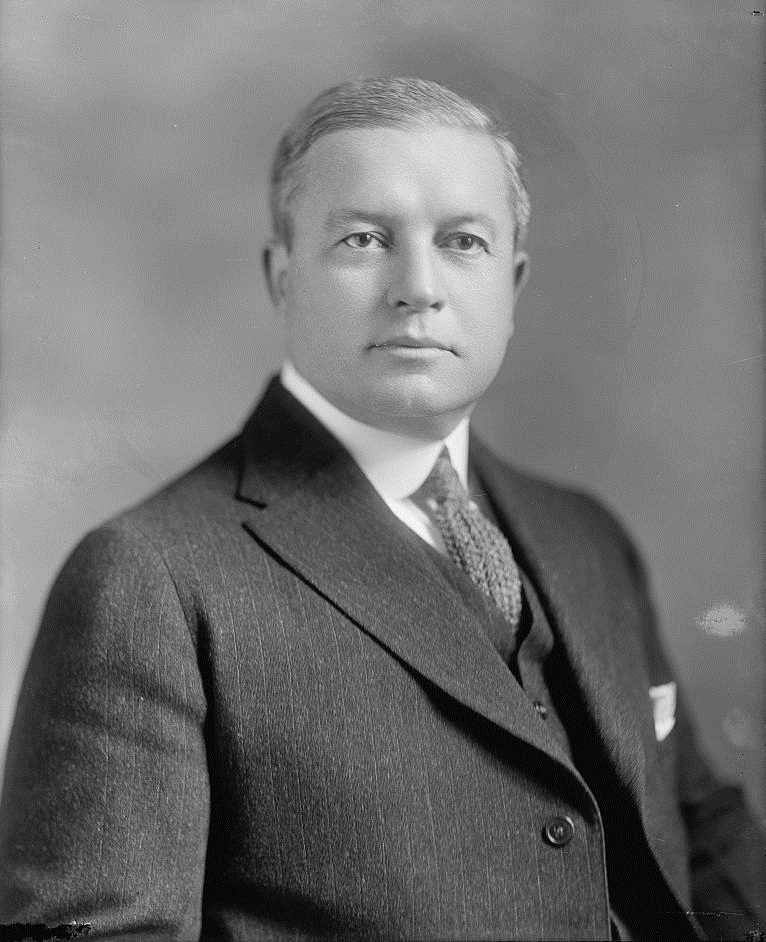

Member of the U.S. House of Representatives from Ohio's 3rd district
- In office March 4, 1913 – March 3, 1921
- Preceded by: James M. Cox
- Succeeded by: Roy G. Fitzgerald

Personal details
- Born: July 2, 1873 Hamilton, Ohio
- Died: November 1, 1929 (aged 56) Hamilton, Ohio
- Resting place: Greenwood Cemetery (Hamilton, Ohio)
- Party: Democratic
- Spouse: Pearl Woods
- Education: Cincinnati Law School

Warren Gard (July 2, 1873 – November 1, 1929) was an attorney, prosecutor, jurist and member of the United States House of Representatives from Ohio for four terms from 1913 to 1921.

== Early life and career ==
Warren Gard was born in Hamilton, Ohio, son of Samuel Zearly Gard and Mary Duke. His father was also an attorney, prosecutor and newspaper publisher. S. Z. Gard served as Butler County, Ohio prosecuting attorney from 1862 to 1866 and again from 1871 to 1872, being one of the prosecutors in the murder case in which Clement Vallandigham, acting for the defense, accidentally shot himself. Samuel Gard also published the True Telegraph newspaper which became the Butler County Democrat. His son Homer Gard, Warren's brother, later owned several newspapers in Ohio, including the Hamilton Evening Journal and Hamilton Daily News.

Warren Gard attended the public schools in Hamilton, attended the University of Cincinnati and graduated from the Cincinnati Law School in 1894. He was admitted to the bar in 1894 and commenced practice in Hamilton. For thirty-five years he was an honored member of the Hamilton bar.

=== Marriage ===
On June 22, 1910, Warren Gard married Pearl Woods (1875-1946) of Hamilton. She was the daughter of Jennie Zuver (1848-1921) and John Robeson Woods (1844-1918) and taught art in the Hamilton Public School System. She is buried beside her husband in Greenwood Cemetery.

Warren Gard was elected county prosecutor in 1894, the youngest in the history of the county, holding the office for 10 years. During this period he prosecuted some outstanding criminal cases, notably that of the State of Ohio versus Alfred A. Knapp, several murder cases, the Bishop faith-cure case, and the Spivey risk cases. He was elected Court of Common Pleas judge in 1907 and held the office for one term until 1912.

== Congress ==
In 1912, Warren Gard was elected as a Democrat from Ohio's Third District to the Sixty-third Congress. He was re-elected in 1914, 1916 and 1918, one of the ablest members of the Ohio delegation during the First World War period. He was a member of the House Judiciary Committee, sustaining the reputation during his years in the House as the most dignified member. In the summer of 1919 he led the fight in Congress for the repeal of wartime prohibition and for a more liberal definition of an "intoxicant." In 1920, Warren Gard was one of two Congressmen chosen from Ohio, the other being Frank Murphy, who were asked by President Woodrow Wilson to take a diplomatic tour to the Philippines. There were over twenty congressmen and their families who took the trip which began on July 27, and ended on August 5, 1920. Warren's wife, Pearl, and any children were allowed to accompany him. Because Pearl and Warren had no children, they asked their niece, Kathleen Neilan (1908-1973), to go with them; she was twelve at the time and was the daughter of Lydia Marie Woods (1883-1952), Pearl's sister, and Judge John F. Neilan II (1881-1945).

Warren was not a candidate for renomination in 1920, but in 1922, ran unsuccessfully for the House seat he had held for four terms.

== Later career and death ==
After his political career, he resumed the practice of law in Hamilton where he died. He is interred in Greenwood Cemetery.

== Sources ==
- United States Congress. "Warren Gard (id: G000048)". Biographical Directory of the United States Congress.
- Ohio : a four-volume reference library on the history of a great state. Chicago: Lewis Publishing Co., 1937, 2520 pgs.
- "Warren Gard Dies." New York Times, 2 November 1929, page 13.

U.S. House of Representatives
Preceded by James M. Cox	Member of the U.S. House of Representatives from Ohio's 3rd congressional district 1913-1921	Succeeded by Roy G. Fitzgerald
