= Mad River Road =

Overland route

Mad River Road was the first overland route between Dayton, Ohio and Cincinnati, Ohio. It was cut by Daniel C. Cooper in 1795 to provide access to the new town of Dayton and the "Mad River Country" northeast, and north of Dayton. It was located at the mouth of the Mad River in the Symmes Purchase. The survey, entered into the record by Cooper and Dr. John Hole, extended Harmer's Trace north from near Cunningham's Station on the Mill Creek to the mouth of the Mad River, establishing the earliest road between Cincinnati and Dayton. Cooper, a surveyor and miller, was instrumental in the early settlement of Dayton, and Dr. Hole, the first physician in Montgomery County, established his cabin in 1796 near the now-extinct town of Woodburne on Mad River Road.

"Be it remembered that pursuant to an order of Court to Daniel Cooper, Daniel Griffing and John Hole on a petition of more than twelve citizens of the County aforesaid, the following survey of a road in the said County was made and reported, to wit: Beginning at Cunningham's Station, thence along the old road four miles and a half, thence North eleven miles, thence North twenty-five degrees East thirteen miles; thence North forty degrees East three miles and a quarter, thence North three miles and a half, thence North ten degrees West one mile and a quarter to the road leading from Hamilton to Dayton town, at the mouth of Mad river, the whole distance being thirty eight miles and three fourths of a mile." (1797 Survey for part of Mad River Road recorded in the Hamilton County, Ohio, Road Book B-1.)

The five-mile segment between David Road in Kettering, Ohio and State Route 725 in Centerville, Ohio that runs through Washington Township is the last remaining traceable portion retaining the original name and following the original route. It is still in daily use more than 200 years later.
