= Patterson Homestead =

Historic house in Ohio, United States

- Rubicon Farm
- U.S. National Register of Historic Places
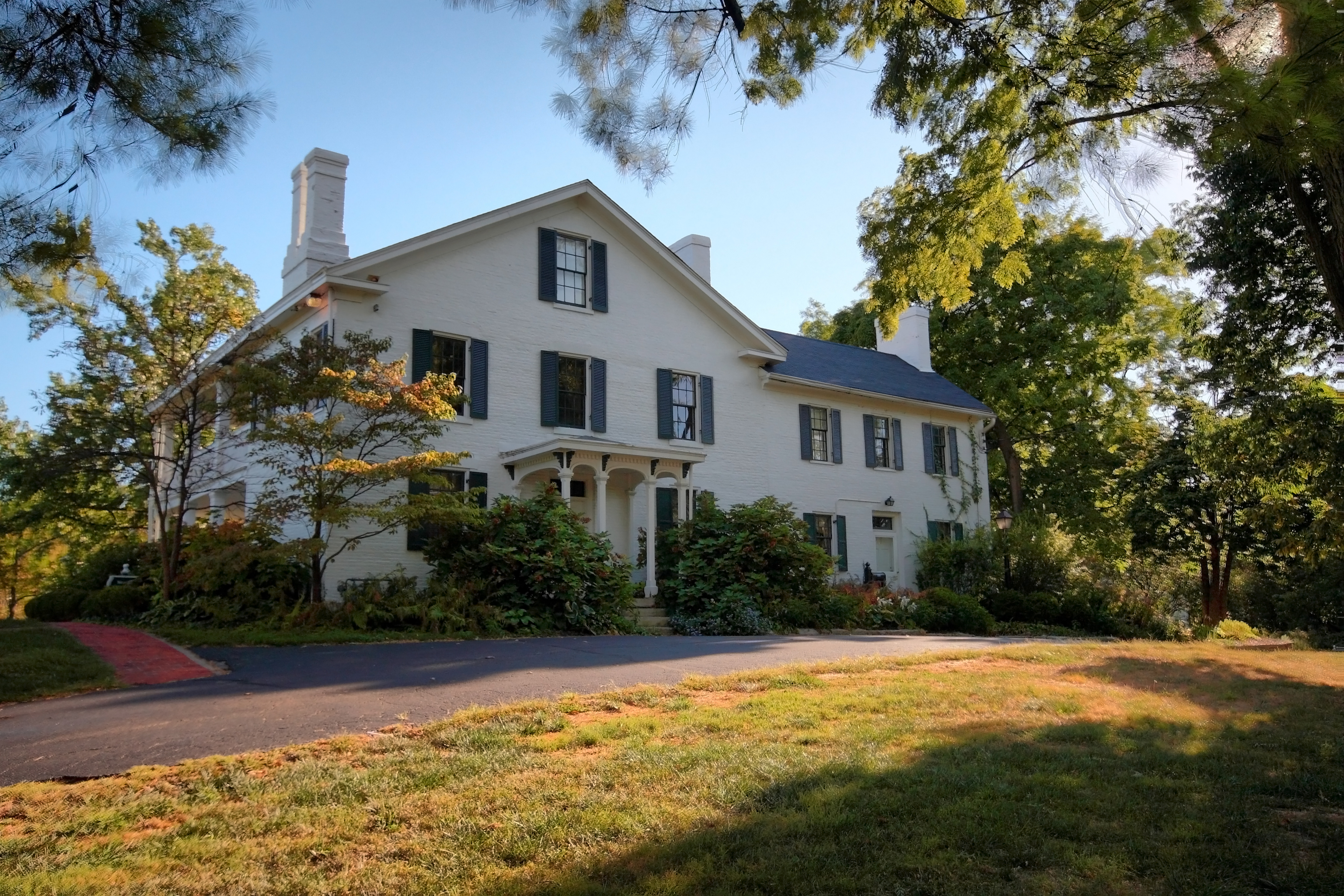
- Patterson Homestead

- Location within Ohio Location within the United States
- Location: 1815 Brown St., Dayton, Ohio
- Coordinates: 39°44′4″N 84°10′56″W
- Built: 1816
- Architect: Robert Patterson
- Architectural style: Federal
- NRHP reference No.: 76001500
- Added to NRHP: September 29, 1976

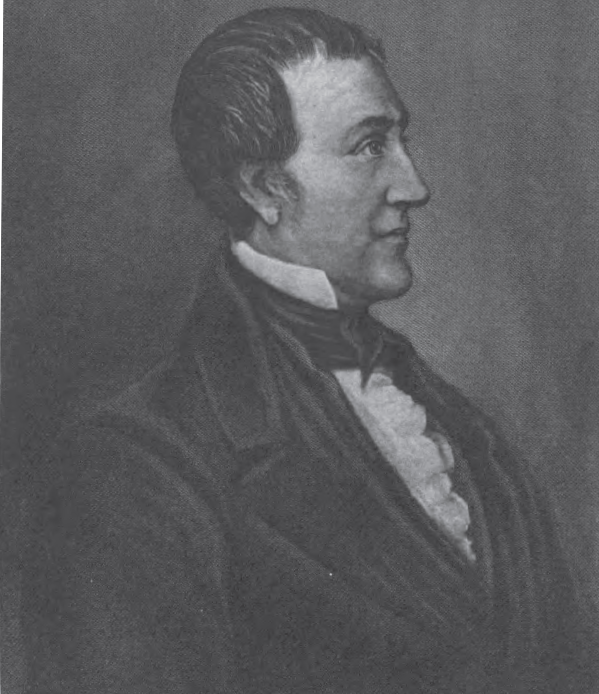

The Patterson Homestead is a historic house museum located at 1815 Brown Street in Dayton, Ohio, United States. It was built in 1816 by American Revolutionary War veteran Colonel Robert Patterson.

The house was built using Federal architecture in several sections over forty years. In 1953, the house was donated to the city of Dayton and has been used for a variety of purposes. At present time, the museum has six rooms containing period artifacts and original Patterson family artifacts.

Robert Patterson's grandsons, John Henry Patterson and Frank Jefferson Patterson lived in the house as young children, and would eventually go on to found the National Cash Register Company (now NCR Corporation) in 1884.

The home is listed on the National Register of Historic Places in 1976 and is currently operated by Dayton History.
