= Jerry Sharkey =

American historian

Gerald Shea "Jerry" Sharkey (April 18, 1942 – April 7, 2014) was an American historic preservationist and historian of the Wright brothers, who conceived the idea for the Dayton Aviation Heritage National Historical Park in Dayton, Ohio. The Dayton Aviation Heritage National Historical Park, which preserves historic sites used by the Wright Brothers throughout Dayton, was established in 1992. Sharkey had led an alliance of the Wright family, members of the U.S. House of Representatives, the local media and U.S. Federal Judge Walter H. Rice to create the national historical park. Many of the sites associated with the Wright brothers (as well as the surrounding buildings) would likely have been demolished if not for the preservation efforts spearheaded by Sharkey. According to Tom Crouch, a senior curator of aeronautics at the National Air and Space Museum in Washington, D.C., Sharkey's efforts helped to "ensure that what the Wright brothers achieved wouldn't be forgotten." Despite his enthusiasm for the Wright brothers and their work, Sharkey was reportedly afraid of flying.

== Biography ==
=== Early life and career ===
Sharkey was born in Dayton, Ohio, on April 18, 1942. His mother was a teacher, and his father was a history book author. He was a 1960 graduate of Chaminade High School and received a bachelor's degree in history from the University of Dayton in 1965. Sharkey spent a brief period as a high school math teacher. He spent the majority of his career as a Montgomery County government employee and official, including a tenure as the superintendent of the county's public nursing home.

=== Dayton Aviation Heritage National Historical Park ===
Sharkey worked for the preservation of historic sites and other places of interest in the Dayton area. City and state officials did not prioritize historic preservation in Dayton at the time. Sharkey did not initially have a passion for aviation history, but noticed that city officials badly neglected buildings associated with some of Dayton's most famous residents, Orville and Wilbur Wright. The city government did little to publicize or celebrate its place in the history of aviation, and Sharkey wished to change that. According to his sister, Mary Anne Sharkey, former journalist with the Dayton Daily News, Sharkey, "He felt that the Wright brothers did not get their due in their own town. He was upset that Kitty Hawk, North Carolina took all the credit for the location of the first flight...They were the first aeronautical engineers and the first test pilots yet Dayton seemed to largely ignore them over the years." Sharkey noted that the Wrights had designed their airplane in Dayton.

Jerry Sharkey's first priority was the Wrights brothers' last remaining bicycle shop in city of Dayton. (Another of the Wrights' bicycle shops had been relocated from Dayton to Greenfield Village in Michigan by Henry Ford decades earlier). The shop, which still stood on Williams Street near West Third Street, was slated for demolition as part of an urban renewal campaign meant to level the surrounding neighborhood as well. Sharkey pleaded with the city to save the bicycle shop, along with some surrounding buildings, going as far as to stand in front of a bulldozer to stop the work. He managed to purchase the Wrights' last bicycle shop for just $10,000. (He later reluctantly donated the same bicycle shop to the National Park Service as a precondition for the creation of the Dayton Aviation Heritage National Historical Park.)

Sharkey soon conceived the idea of a potential national park to protect and preserve what remained of the Dayton city landmarks associated with the Wright brothers. However, he needed to overcome decades of local disinterest and opposition to the preservation the buildings. The construction of a highway and riots during the 1960s had leveled much of the neighborhood had already destroyed much of the Dayton neighborhood where the Wright brothers had lived by the 1970s.

Jerry Sharkey founded the Aviation Trail Inc., a nonprofit group dedicated to the creation of a potential national park trail focusing on the Wright brothers and their work in Dayton. Sharkey recruited a group of prominent figures associated with Dayton to lobby the federal government and the National Park Service to create a new national park in the city. Noted politicians and journalists who joined with Sharkey's campaign included Dayton Daily News publisher Brad Tillson, U.S. Rep. Dave Hobson, Michael Gessel (an aide to U.S. Rep. Tony P. Hall), and U.S. District Judge Walter H. Rice. Sharkey also persuaded historian Tom D. Crouch to join the movement to create the historic district. In 2014, Michael Gessel, now vice president of federal programs for the Dayton Development Corporation, fully credited Sharkey with creating the park, "The idea advanced because (Sharkey) pushed it," said Gessel, now Dayton Development Coalition vice president of federal programs. "He was instrumental in saving the buildings that became the fabric of the park." Members of the U.S. Congress passed legislation leading to the creation of the park because of the lobbying efforts.

President George H. W. Bush signed the bill which established the Dayton Aviation Heritage National Historical Park in 1992. The new park also preserved the home of poet, Paul Laurence Dunbar, a friend of the Wright Brothers. A new visitors center and other facilities were opened by 2003, in time for the centennial of the first flight.

Jerry Sharkey died from heart failure at his home in Oakwood, Ohio, on April 7, 2014, at the age of 71. He was survived by his second wife of twenty-two years, Claire Martin Sharkey, and their two children, Kevin and Cory, and two children from his marriage to his first wife, MaryLou Benjock: Jeff Sharkey and Lisa Parilo.

== See also ==
- Dayton Aviation Heritage National Historical Park
