= Israel Ludlow =

American government surveyor

- Born: 1765; Morristown, New Jersey
- Died: January 1804 (aged 38–39); Cincinnati, Ohio
- Resting place: Spring Grove Cemetery
- Spouse: Charlotte (Chambers) Ludlow

Israel Ludlow (1765 – January 1804) was a government surveyor who helped found Cincinnati, Dayton and Hamilton in southwest Ohio.

== Early life ==
Israel Ludlow was born near Morristown, New Jersey in 1765. In 1786, each of the thirteen states was to appoint a man to help survey the Seven Ranges in the easternmost portion of the Northwest Territory under the Land Ordinance of 1785. Ludlow was appointed to fill the vacant South Carolina surveyorship. Ludlow was one of two surveyors to stay in settlements near the Ohio River the winter of 1786–1787, and completed the survey of the seventh range, plats, and notes by August 1787.

== Career ==
Later in 1787, a land company called the Ohio Company of Associates contracted with the Congress of the Confederation to buy a 1,500,000-acre tract along the Ohio River to the west of the Seven Ranges. Ludlow surveyed the north line of this tract that is known as Israel Ludlow's Survey.

Virginia was granted lands between the Scioto River and Little Miami River in Ohio for bounties for its war veterans in a tract called the Virginia Military District. John Cleves Symmes purchased a large tract between the Little Miami River and the Great Miami River called the Symmes Purchase. Symmes had Ludlow survey a line between the sources of the Scioto and Little Miami to determine the boundary between the tracts, afterwards known as the Ludlow Line, the subject of decades of legislation and court action due to the difficulty in determining the source of the Scioto River.

On August 25, 1788, Matthias Denman, Robert Patterson, and John Filson entered an agreement to found Cincinnati, with Ludlow taking Filson's place upon his death. The town was settled December 28, 1788 by Ludlow and twenty-six other people. He surveyed the town by January 1789.

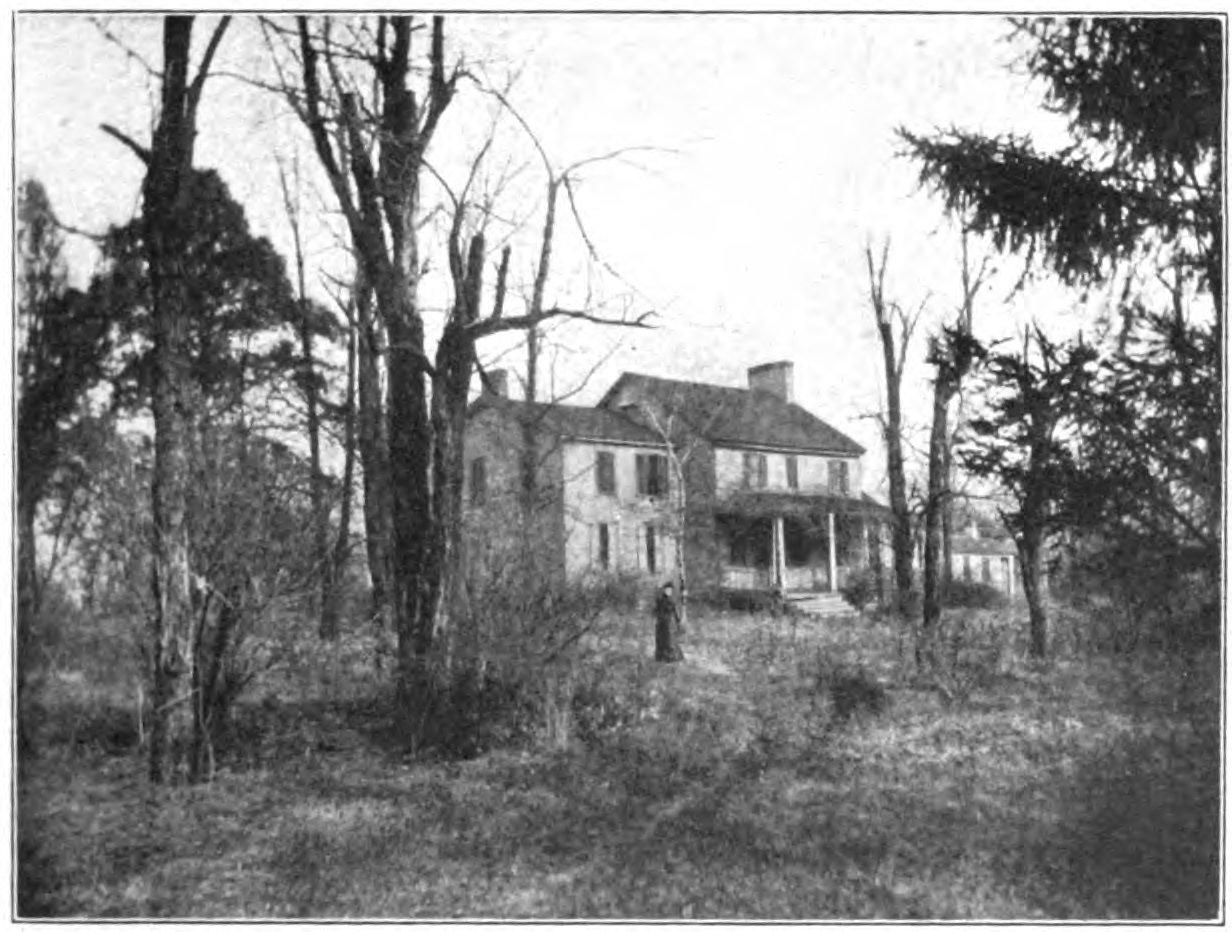
The Ludlow Mansion, located near Spring Grove Cemetery, in Cincinnati, at the time known as Ludlow's Station. Israel Ludlow had it built around 1800. After Ludlow's death, Jared Mansfield lived there. The home was demolished in 1891, and this drawing comes from a photograph taken shortly before demolition.

When Hamilton County, Ohio was formed January 2, 1790, Ludlow was named clerk. In 1790, Ludlow established the community of Ludlow's Station. In 1794, as proprietor, he laid out Hamilton, Ohio, and in 1795, with Governor Arthur St. Clair, Jonathan Dayton, and William McMillan, he planned Dayton, Ohio.

== Personal life ==
In 1796, Ludlow married Charlotte Chambers of Chambersburg, Pennsylvania. That year he built the largest house in Cincinnati, known as the "Ludlow mansion". Israel and Charlotte had four children: James Chambers Ludlow (1797–1841), Martha Catharine Ludlow (1799–1834), Sarah Bella Ludlow (1802–1882), and Israel L. Ludlow (1804–1846).

One of Ludlow's granddaughters married Salmon P. Chase, another married Randall Hunt, and his daughter, Sarah Bella Ludlow married John McLean.

== Death ==
He died on January 21, 1804, after a 4 day illness and was buried with Masonic honors in the Presbyterian Graveyard in Cincinnati.

== Legacy ==
One historian said: "By the time of his death in the early 1800s he had surveyed more land in the Ohio Country than any other federal surveyor." His remains were later moved to Cincinnati's Spring Grove Cemetery. Hamilton, Dayton, and Cincinnati each have a street named after Ludlow. Ludlow Falls near Dayton is also named after him. Two streams named Ludlow Creek are in Miami County, Ohio and Greene County, Ohio. Ludlow, Kentucky, directly across from Cincinnati, Ohio, also bears his name.
