= WACO Air Museum =

- Location within Ohio
- Location: Troy, Ohio
- Coordinates: 40.0126°N 84.199°W
- Type: Aviation museum
- Director: Nancy Royer
- Website: www.wacoairmuseum.org

The WACO Air Museum is an aviation museum located in Troy, Ohio focused on the history of the Waco Aircraft Company.

== History ==
In 1997, WACO Field opened and a historic barn was raised on the property. A second building was completed in 2009.

The museum received two airplanes, two land vehicles and other objects on loan from the Ohio Historical Society in 2009.

A theater made from a replica CG-4A glider was completed in 2015.

The museum broke ground on a new Learning Center in September 2017.

The museum acquired the prototype RPT in 2018.

The museum restarted work to complete the interior of the learning center in 2024. The center, renamed the Robinson Wing, opened in February 2026.

== Facilities ==
The museum is located on Waco Field Airport (FAA LID: 1WF), which features a 2,385 ft (727 m) grass runway.

== Collection ==
- Waco 4 – replica
- Waco 9
- Waco ATO
- Waco Cootie – replica
- Waco GXE
- Waco RPT
- Waco UMF
- Waco YKS-6
- Waco YMF-5C
