= Carillon Historical Park =

- Deeds Carillon
- U.S. National Register of Historic Places
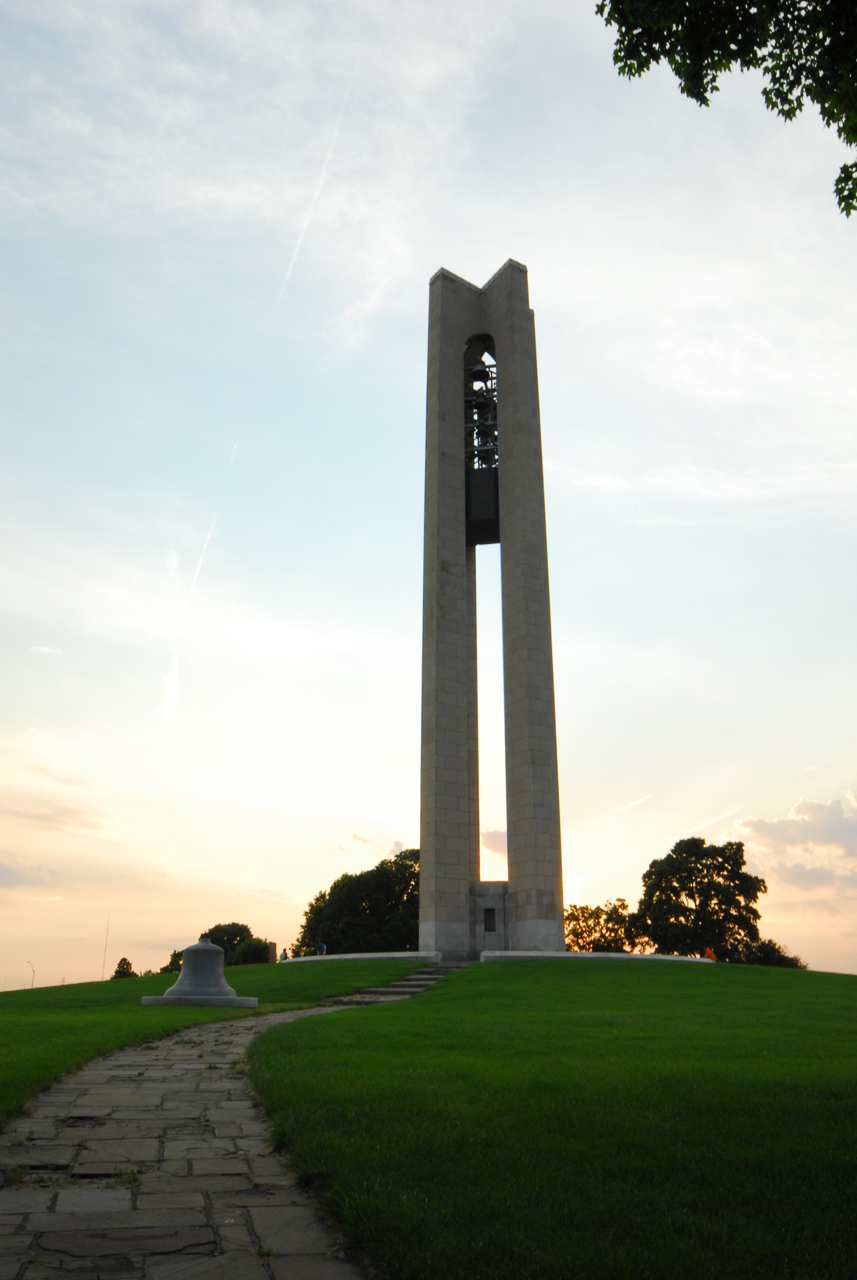
- Deeds Carillon at dusk

- Location within Ohio Location within the United States
- Location: Dayton, Ohio
- Coordinates: 39°43′51″N 84°11′51″W
- Built: 1940
- Architect: Reinhard and Hofmeister; Olmstead Bros.
- Architectural style: Moderne
- NRHP reference No.: 05000756
- Added to NRHP: July 27, 2005

Carillon Historical Park is a 65-acre (26 ha) park and museum in Dayton, Ohio, which contains historic buildings and exhibits concerning the history of technology, as well as the history of Dayton and its residents from 1796 to present. As a part of the University of Dayton, the historical elements of the park were the brainchild of Colonel Edward Deeds. The park contains sections for settlement, transportation, invention, and industry, as well as a small assortment of attractions. In 2005, Carillon Historical Park merged with the Montgomery County Historical Society to form Dayton History.

== Deeds Carillon ==
The park is named for the 151-foot-tall (46 m) Deeds Carillon. Colonel Edward Deeds, in whose name the bell tower was built, was a Dayton industrialist and innovator. The art moderne-style tower was built in 1942 and designed by New York architects Reinhard & Hofmeister. It was funded by Edward Deeds' wife Edith Walton Deeds and was designed to commemorate the Deeds family. When the tower was built, each of 23 bells was inscribed with the name of a family member, with the "silent" bells bearing the names of deceased family members and ringing bells cast with the names of family members then living. Today, with 57 bells, the carillon is Ohio's largest. The National Park Service listed the Deeds Carillon on the National Register of Historic Places in 2005.

Carillon Park refurbished the carillon in 1988, converting it from an electric keyboard controlled instrument to a traditional, baton-keyboard mechanical carillon. The Park's carillonneur, Allan Bowman, performs live carillon concerts every Sunday at 3:00 pm from May to October.

== Kettering Family Education Center ==
The Kettering Family Education Center anchors the park and features changing exhibits in the National City Exhibit Gallery, a video about the park, and gift and snack shops. There are also rooms for education presentations.

== Wright Brothers Aviation Center ==
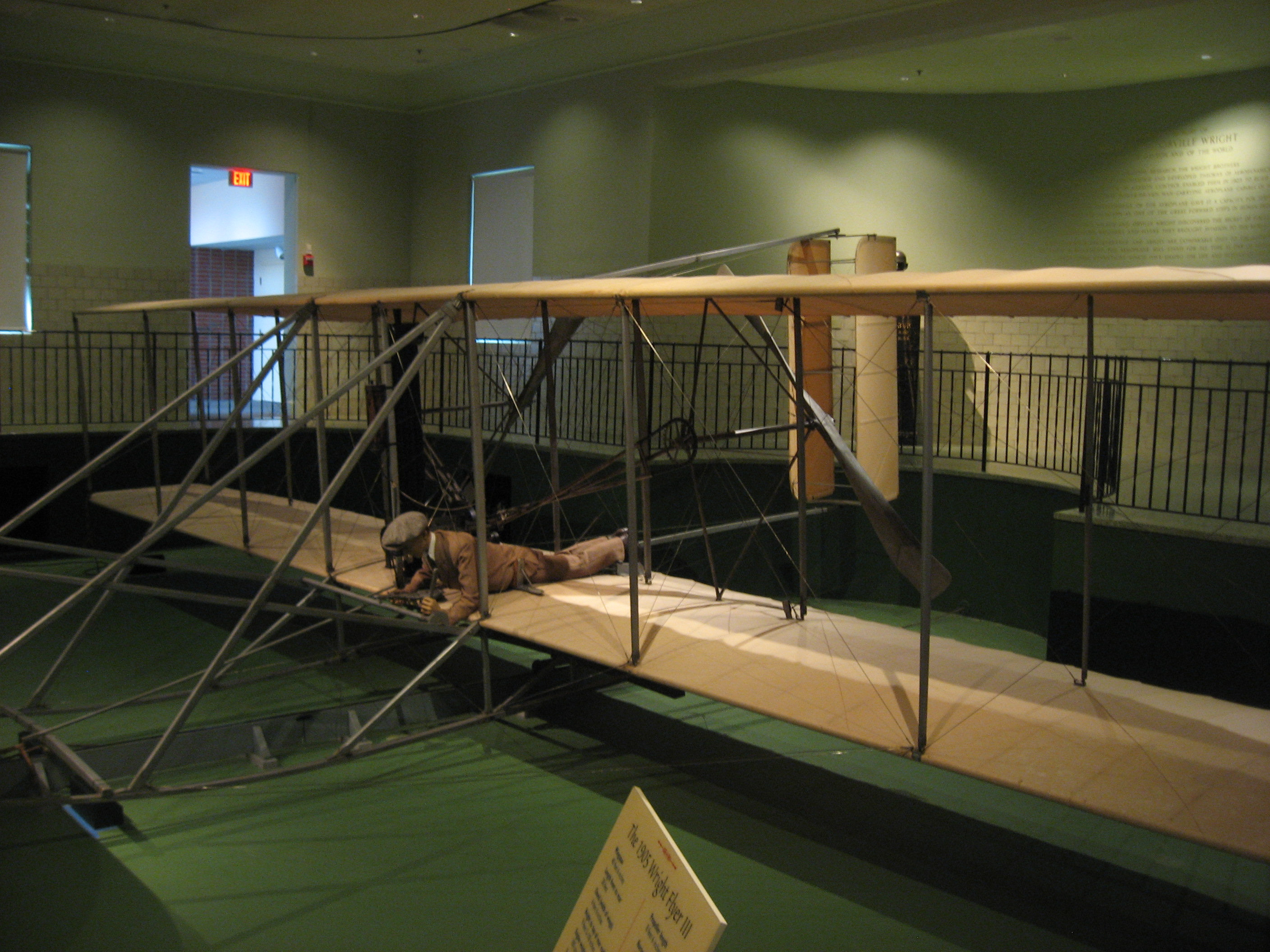
Wright Flyer III

The John W. Berry Sr. Wright Brothers Aviation Center houses the 1905 Wright Flyer III, the world's first practical airplane. The airplane, a unit of Dayton Aviation Heritage National Historical Park, was restored from 1948 to 1950 with the initial consultation of Orville Wright before his 1948 death.

== Settlement exhibits ==
- Newcom Tavern - 1796 home of Col. George Newcom and family, oldest building in Dayton
- William Morris House - 1815 stone cottage
- Locust Grove School - 1896 one-room schoolhouse used for over 30 years

== Transportation exhibits ==
An original lock of the Miami and Erie Canal is located on the grounds, as is a canal toll office. The transportation center vehicles include the John Quincy Adams steam locomotive (built in 1835 by the B&O Railroad and is the oldest US-built locomotive that still exists), a Barney and Smith passenger car built in Dayton, a Conestoga wagon, a 1908 Stoddard-Dayton automobile, a 1915 Xenia cyclecar, an interurban railcar, and other vehicles associated with Dayton. Among the latter, added to the collection in 1988, is a 1949-built Marmon-Herrington trolley bus, which was number 515 in the fleet of the City Transit Company and provided service on the Dayton trolley bus system from 1949 until about 1982. It arrived at the museum in August 1988 and replaced a similar Marmon-Herrington trolley bus, ex-Dayton 501, that had been on display there since April 1988 but was then donated to the Cincinnati Transit Historical Association under an agreement in which Carillon Park received No. 515 from the Miami Valley Regional Transit Authority in exchange. The center also displays the final SUV made at the former General Motors Moraine Assembly, next to the first windshield made by Fuyao Glass America, which redeveloped the factory.

== Invention and industry ==
- Deeds Barn - features such inventions as a Liberty aircraft engine, early Frigidaire refrigerator, 1912 Cadillac with the Delco automobile electric system.
- Print Shop - working 1930s print shop
- Corliss Engine Building - houses the Corliss Engine that provided both electrical power and steam heat for the National Cash Register Company from 1902 to 1948.

== Attractions ==
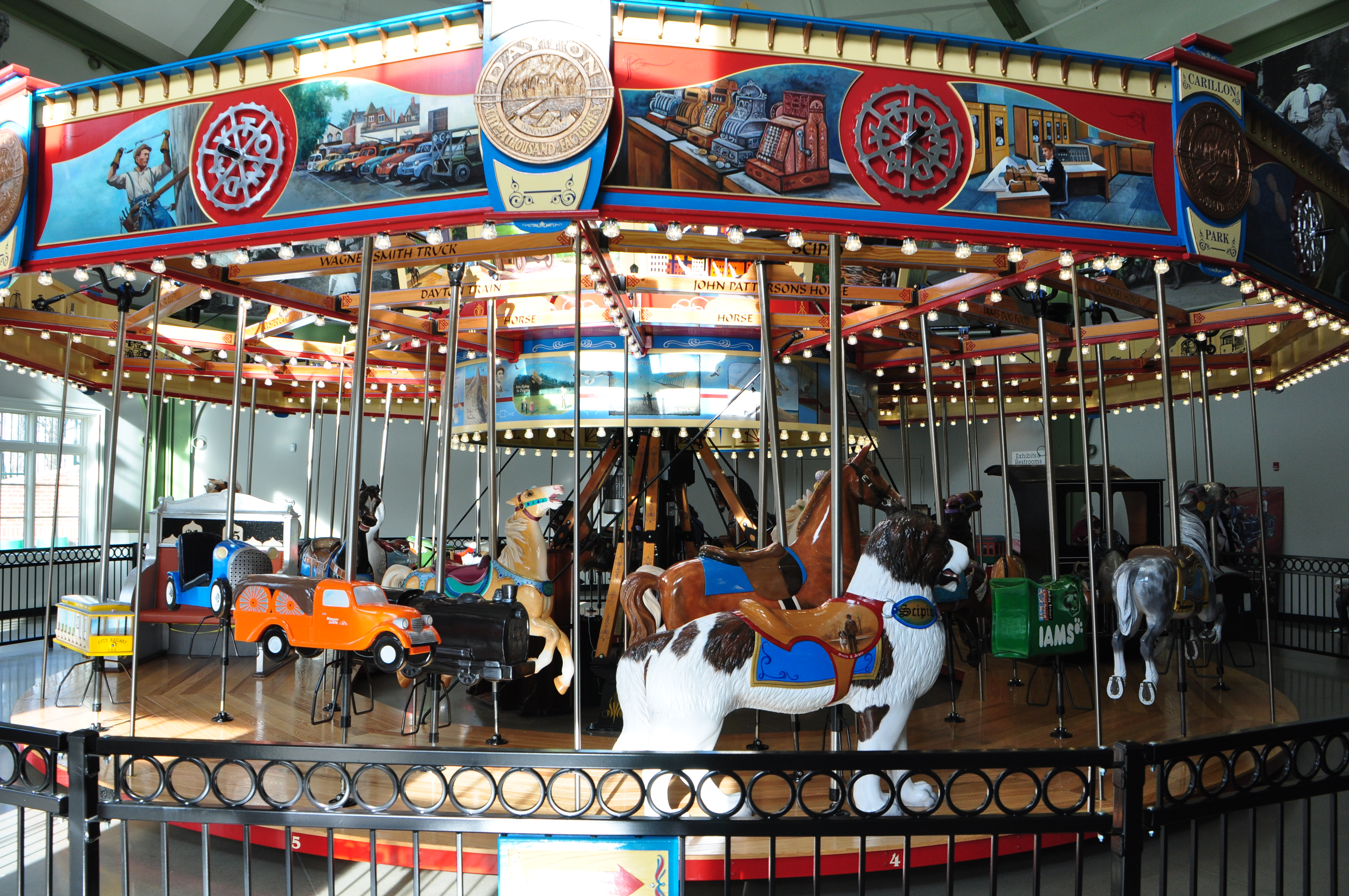
The Carousel of Dayton Innovation

Carillon Historical Park contains a 7 1/2 in (190.5 mm) gauge miniature railroad operated by the Carillon Park Rail & Steam Society, which has provided intermittent train rides for park guests since 1985. In 2011, the Carousel of Dayton Innovation, a brand-new wood-carved carousel built by the Carousel Works, was installed in the park's Heritage Center of Manufacturing and Entrepreneurship building. The 3 ft (914 mm) narrow-gauge Carillon Park Railroad, built by Severn Lamb in 2023, utilizes an electric locomotive with the façade of a steam locomotive that pulls a two-car train along a loop of track around the park.

== See also ==
- The Henry Ford
- National Register of Historic Places listings in Dayton, Ohio
- Thomas Rees Memorial Carillon
