= Newcom Tavern =

Coordinates: 39°43′43″N 84°12′01″W

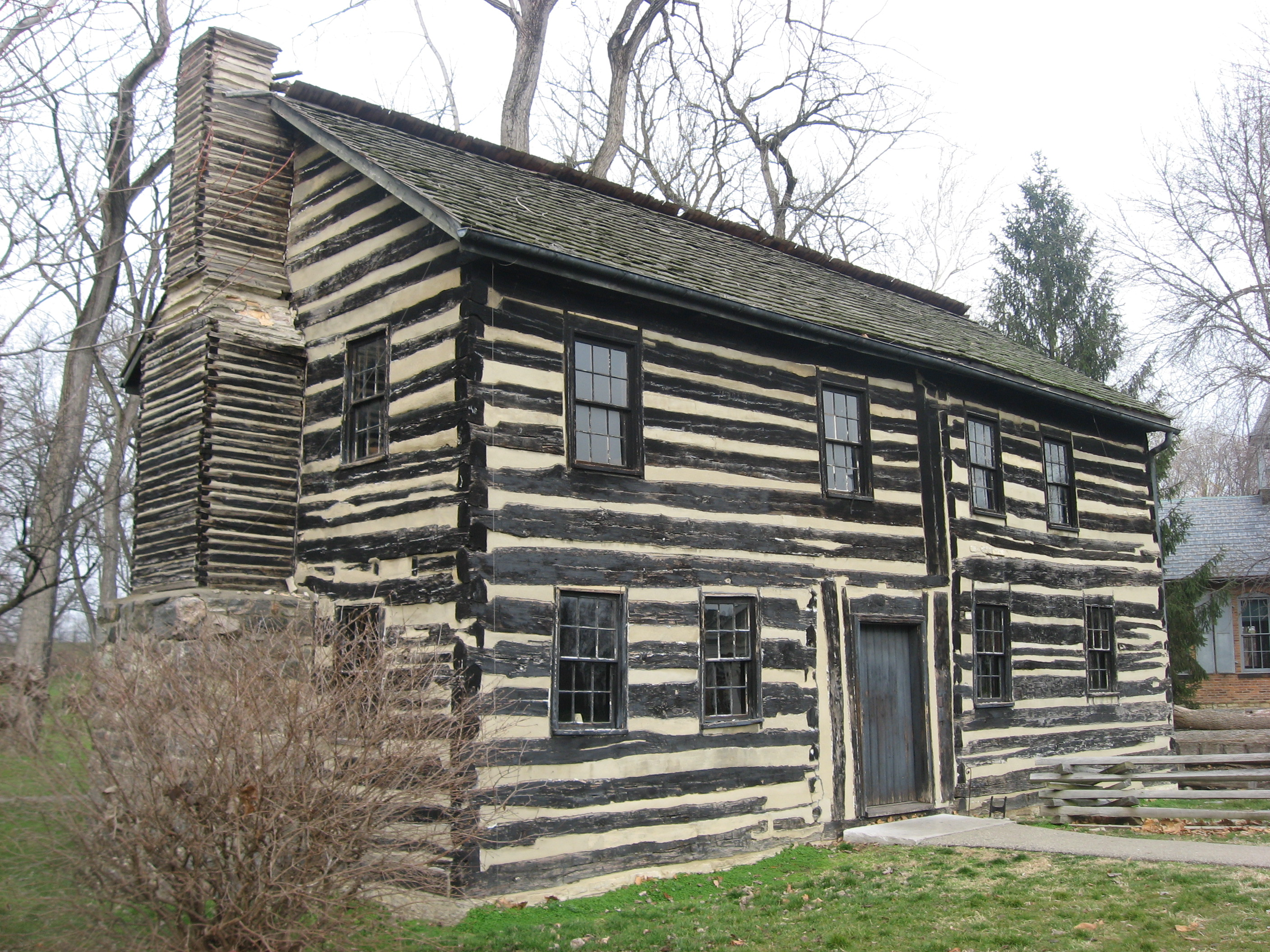
Newcom Tavern at Carillon Historical Park

Newcom Tavern, also known as the "Old Cabin", is a historic structure in Dayton, Ohio and is the city's oldest existing building. It was built in 1796 for Colonel George Newcom and his wife Mary, who ran it as a tavern and hostel. The building passed through several owners, and its historical significance was forgotten until planned construction revealed the original log structure. The building was moved twice and now located in Dayton's Carillon Historical Park and operated as a museum.

== Settlement of the area ==
Dayton was first established as the New Jersey Land Company, under the leadership of Jonathan Dayton, with partners General Wilkinson, General St. Clair and Colonel Ludlow, employed surveyors to lay out a town site between the two Miami rivers.

== Construction and early use ==
The original structure was built in 1796 for Colonel George Newcom, one of the first settlers in Dayton after the Treaty of Greenville (1795) and Dayton's first sheriff, state senator, clerk of courts, and bank president, and his wife Mary. It was built by millwright Robert Edgar and was one of the first structures built in the area. Edgar received seventy-five cents a day for its construction. Edgar lodged at the Newcoms' one room cabin while working, paying one deer a week for room and board.

The house originally consisted of two rooms: one upstairs and one downstairs, with a ladder to access the upstairs room, and was located at what became the southwest corner of Main and Water (later renamed Monument) Streets. The size of the cabin was doubled two years after it was built when the Newcoms added a tavern to generate income; food and lodging for one person and a horse cost 65 cents. The building served as Dayton's first school, first church, courthouse, council chamber and store. Church services were held in the building for three years until 1799, when a blockhouse was built, after which services were held in the blockhouse.

It was best known as a crossroads tavern in the Northwest Territory for pioneers and drovers. During the War of 1812 it was used by Colonel Robert Patterson as his headquarters. In 1815 the Newcoms sold the tavern, which passed through other owners until purchased by Joseph Shaffer, who used it as a general store until 1894. In 1881 the upper floor was rented by Frederick Husson and his wife, who delivered a baby girl in a second floor bedroom in 1883.

== Move to Van Cleve Park ==
The building had been covered in clapboards, which disguised the log structure, and the historical significance of it had been forgotten, and in 1894, architect Charles Insco Williams planned to raze the structure to make room for an apartment building. Removal of the clapboards revealed the log structure, and the tavern was rediscovered. The building's owner donated it to the city, and John Patterson, owner of National Cash Register (now NCR) donated funds to move it to Van Cleve Park, now RiverScape MetroPark. In 1896 the Centennial Celebration Committee helped move the structure to the park on Monument Avenue and the Daughters of the American Revolution raised money to restore it. In 1896 it was opened as a public museum and held relics donated by Daytonians. The building was flooded during the 1913 Great Dayton Flood but survived. Civil War veteran Frederick Phillip Beaver, who owned Dayton's Beaver Power Company, left $10,000 for the building's preservation in his 1936 will.

== Move to Carillon Park ==
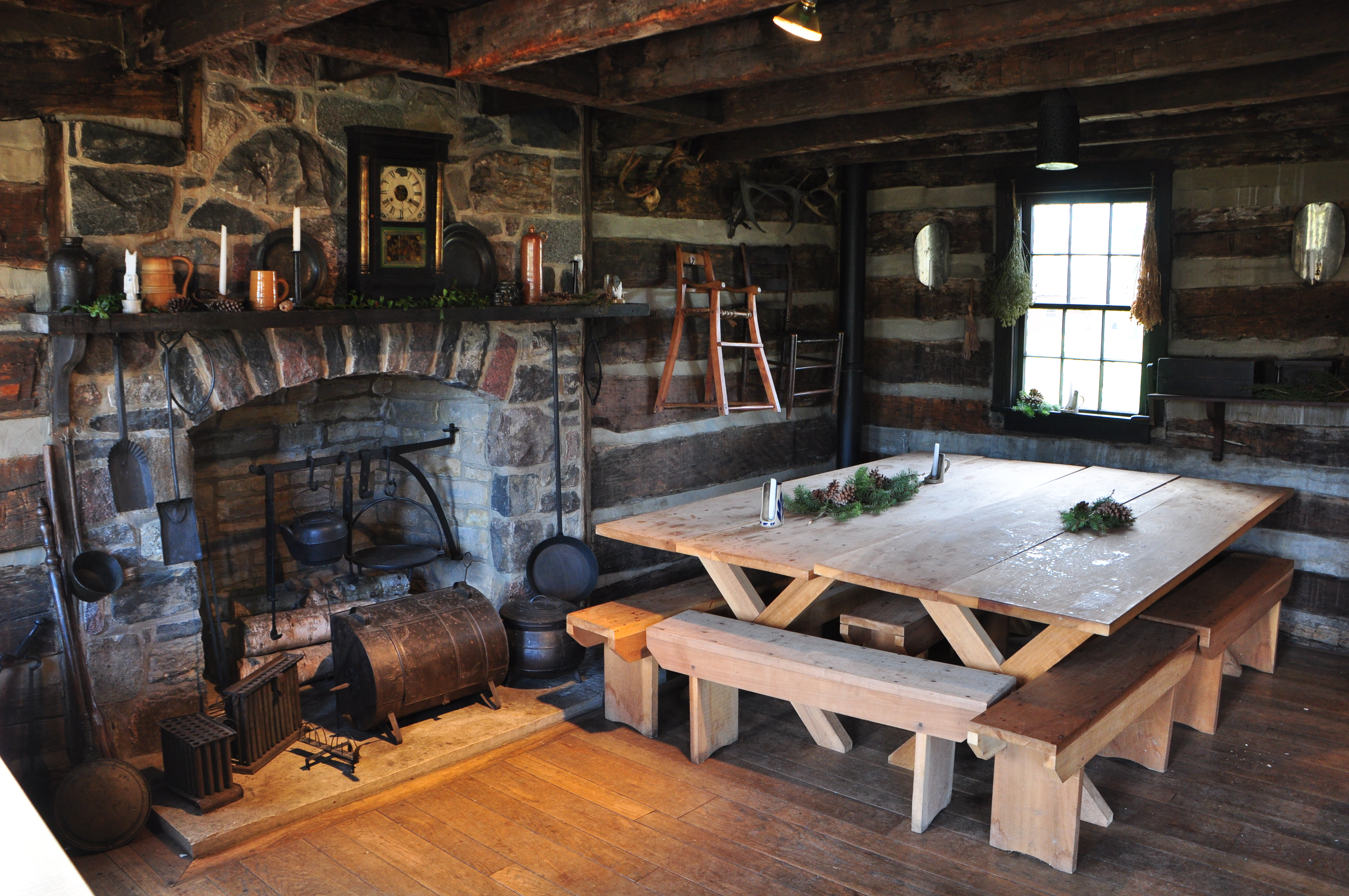
Interior of Newcom Tavern in Dayton, Ohio's Carillon Historic Park

In 1962 the Dayton and Montgomery County Historical Society, which owned the building, decided it should be moved to more accessible site, as the Van Cleve site did not have adjacent parking. In October 1964, the Tavern was relocated to Carillon Historical Park (then Carillon Park) where it joined the Pioneer House as part of the Settlement Exhibit. The move took twelve hours, requiring a circuitous five-mile route and two crossings of the Great Miami River to move the building two miles. Negotiating Mound Street as it crosses West Fifth Street took an hour and a half. The building was reopened in May 1965 and its ownership transferred to Educational and Music Arts, Inc., the managers of Carillon Park and the Deeds Carillon. Present at the ceremony were several members of the Newcom family and the woman who had been born in the building in 1883.

The lower level of the tavern is open to the public, but the upper level is no longer open.
