= Dayton History =

Dayton History is an organization located in Dayton, Ohio, USA, formed in 2005 by the merger of the Montgomery County Historical Society (originally the Dayton Historical Society) and Dayton's Carillon Historical Park.

The private non-profit (501c3) organization was established to acknowledge the history of Dayton, Ohio. The following sites are under Dayton History’s care:

- Carillon Historical Park: 30 historic structures and over three million artifacts
- Carillon Brewing Company: The only fully operational production brewery in a U.S. museum.
- Hawthorn Hill: Orville Wright’s success mansion, est. 1914.
- Patterson Homestead: Originally the home of Colonel Robert Patterson, a Revolutionary War soldier and founder of Lexington, Kentucky, and Cincinnati, Ohio, est. 1816.
- The Archive Center: A 100+ year-old collection of millions of the Dayton region’s artifacts, originally managed by the Montgomery County Historical Society, est. 1896.
- The Mound Cold War Discovery Center: Top-secret, scientific work of Mound Laboratory used during the Cold War, Atomic Age, and the Space Race, 1948–2003.
