= Robert Patterson (pioneer) =

American pioneer (1753–1827)

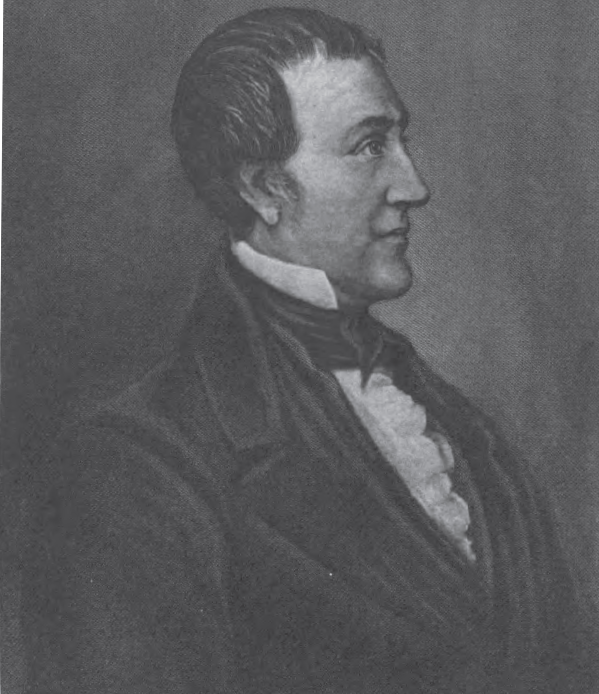
An illustration of Patterson

Colonel Robert Patterson (1753 – 1827) was an American soldier and settler who helped found the cities of Lexington, Kentucky and Cincinnati, Ohio.

== Early life ==
Born in Pennsylvania, Patterson migrated to Kentucky in 1775. He served in the Kentucky militia in the western theater of the American Revolutionary War. He took part in George Rogers Clark's celebrated Illinois campaign in 1778, and fought in many other actions during the war. He was a captain of the Fayette County militia in the Battle of Blue Licks, the last major battle of the war in the west. He was, along with Daniel Boone, one of the few senior officers to survive that disastrous battle.

In 1786 he was severely injured in Logan's Raid in the Northwest Indian War. Patterson moved north from Kentucky into the Northwest Territory in 1788, and was one of the three founders of Cincinnati, a river port along the north side of the Ohio River across from Kentucky.

== Later life ==
Patterson then moved to Dayton, Ohio, in 1802 and continued his military service as a quartermaster during the War of 1812. Patterson's farm, Rubicon, was located two miles south of Dayton where he and his wife Elizabeth (Lindsay) raised eight children. Their land is currently part of the University of Dayton and stretched from there west to the Old soldiers' home (presently the Dayton VA Medical Center).

== Personal life ==
One of Patterson's grandchildren, John H. Patterson, became a prominent Dayton citizen and founded the National Cash Register Company (now NCR Corporation) in 1884.

Patterson's granddaughter Eliza Jane (Brown) Anderson was the First Lady of Ohio 1865–1866. Her husband was Governor Charles Anderson.

== Legacy ==
Patterson's home, known as the Patterson Homestead, is now a historic house museum operated by Dayton History.

== Sources ==
- Ohio Historical Society. "Robert Patterson" in Ohio History Central: An Online Encyclopedia of Ohio History, 2005.
- State Library of Ohio. "Patterson Family Papers".
- Entry from the New International Encyclopedia
- Hammon, Neal O. Daniel Boone and the Defeat at Blue Licks. Minneapolis: The Boone Society, 2005.

=== Primary sources ===
- Brown-Patterson Papers (MS-015). Dayton Metro Library, Dayton, Ohio. "View online finding aid".
- Patterson Family Papers (MS-236). Wright State University Special Collections and Archives, Dayton, Ohio. "View online finding aid".
