= National Register of Historic Places listings in Dayton, Ohio =

This is a list of the National Register of Historic Places listings in Dayton, Ohio.

== Current listings ==
	Name on the Register	Image	Date listed	Location	Description
1	Antioch Temple	Antioch Temple	January 14, 2013 (#12001182)	107 E. 1st St. 39°45′47″N 84°11′26″W	
2	Biltmore Hotel	Biltmore Hotel	February 3, 1982 (#82003616)	210 N. Main St. 39°45′46″N 84°11′32″W	
3	Bimm Fireproof Warehouse	Bimm Fireproof Warehouse	July 18, 2016 (#16000461)	315 E. 1st St. 39°45′49″N 84°11′13″W	
4	Marcus Bossler House	Marcus Bossler House	September 27, 1980 (#80003170)	136 S. Dutoit St. 39°45′44″N 84°10′25″W	
5	O. P. Boyer's and Sons Funeral Home		June 23, 2022 (#100007812)	609 West Riverview Ave. 39°45′49″N 84°12′13″W	
6	James Brooks House	James Brooks House	May 29, 1975 (#75001495)	41 E. 1st St. 39°45′46″N 84°11′28″W	
7	Samuel N. Brown House	Samuel N. Brown House	April 11, 1977 (#77001075)	1633 Wayne Ave. 39°44′42″N 84°10′12″W	
8	Jonah Bull House	Jonah Bull House	December 19, 2008 (#08001198)	2233 Wayne Ave. 39°44′22″N 84°09′47″W	
9	Central Avenue Historic District	Central Avenue Historic District	December 16, 1982 (#82001476)	201-338 Central Ave. 39°46′02″N 84°12′27″W	
10	Central Branch, National Home for Disabled Volunteer Soldiers	Central Branch, National Home for Disabled Volunteer Soldiers	January 15, 2004 (#03001412)	4100 W. 3rd St. 39°44′35″N 84°15′39″W	National Historic Landmark designation October 16, 2012
11	College Hill Historic District		June 20, 2023 (#100009040)	Roughly bound by Philadelphia Dr., Wesleyan Rd., alley south of Salem Ave., and Cornell Dr. 39°46′44″N 84°14′28″W	
12	Commercial Building	Commercial Building	December 2, 1982 (#82001477)	44 S. Ludlow St. 39°45′29″N 84°11′36″W	
13	Conover Building	Conover Building	October 14, 1975 (#75001497)	4 S. Main St. 39°45′33″N 84°11′29″W	
14	Dayton Arcade	Dayton Arcade	June 18, 1975 (#75001498)	From Ludlow to Main St. between 3rd and 4th Sts. 39°45′30″N 84°11′33″W	
15	Dayton Art Institute	Dayton Art Institute	November 19, 1974 (#74001579)	Forest and Riverview Aves. 39°45′57″N 84°12′04″W	
16	Dayton Aviation Heritage National Historical Park	Dayton Aviation Heritage National Historical Park	September 8, 1988 (#01000227)	16 South Williams Street; 39°45′21″N 84°12′42″W	
17	Dayton Canoe Club	Dayton Canoe Club	July 2, 2008 (#08000591)	1020 Riverside Dr. 39°46′32″N 84°11′48″W	
18	Dayton Country Club		February 20, 2024 (#100009927)	555 Kramer Road; 39°43′34″N 84°11′09″W	
19	Dayton Daily News Building	Dayton Daily News Building	November 30, 1978 (#78002144)	4th and Ludlow Sts. 39°45′28″N 84°11′37″W	
20	Dayton Fire Department Station No. 16	Dayton Fire Department Station No. 16	May 23, 1980 (#80003171)	31 S. Jersey St. 39°45′53″N 84°09′12″W	
21	Dayton Fire Station No. 14	Dayton Fire Station No. 14	September 27, 1980 (#80003172)	1422 N. Main St. 39°46′38″N 84°12′09″W	
22	Dayton Motor Car Company Historic District	Dayton Motor Car Company Historic District	May 31, 1984 (#84003785)	15, 101, 123-5 Bainbridge; 9-111 and 122-124 McDonough; 39°45′34″N 84°10′50″W	
23	Dayton Power and Light Building Group	Dayton Power and Light Building Group	April 12, 2006 (#06000273)	601, 607-609, 613-645 E. 3rd St. 39°45′40″N 84°10′57″W	
24	Dayton Stove and Cornice Works	Dayton Stove and Cornice Works	November 26, 1980 (#80003173)	24-28 N. Patterson Boulevard; 39°45′39″N 84°11′12″W	Demolished
25	Dayton Terra-Cotta Historic District	Dayton Terra-Cotta Historic District	May 31, 1984 (#84003789)	S. Ludlow and W. 5th Sts. 39°45′23″N 84°11′32″W	
26	Dayton View Historic District	Dayton View Historic District	July 19, 1984 (#84003787)	Roughly bounded by Broadway, Harvard Boulevard, and Superior and Salem Aves. 39°46′04″N 84°12′59″W	
27	Dayton View Triangle Historic District		August 1, 2022 (#100007950)	Bounded by Salem Ave., Cornell, and Philadelphia Drs. 39°46′48″N 84°13′40″W	
28	Dayton Women's Club	Dayton Women's Club	February 24, 1975 (#75001499)	225 N. Ludlow St. 39°45′46″N 84°11′42″W	
29	Dayton Young Men's Christian Association Building	Dayton Young Men's Christian Association Building	August 25, 1988 (#88001299)	117 W. Monument Ave. 39°45′49″N 84°11′45″W	
30	Deeds' Barn	Deeds' Barn	December 4, 1979 (#79001904)	Carillon Historical Park; 39°43′42″N 84°12′03″W	Moved in 2009 from its previous location at 35 Moraine Circle in Kettering
31	Deeds Carillon	Deeds Carillon	July 27, 2005 (#05000756)	1000 Carillon Boulevard; 39°43′51″N 84°11′51″W	
32	Delco Building	Delco Building	July 14, 2016 (#16000462)	329 E. 1st St. 39°45′49″N 84°11′11″W	
33	Downtown Dayton Historic District		August 29, 2019 (#100004316)	Roughly bounded by I 75, St. Clair St., west face of Patterson Blvd., Monument Ave., and Sixth St./Norfolk Southern Railroad line 39°45′39″N 84°11′32″W	
34	Dunbar Historic District	Dunbar Historic District	June 30, 1980 (#80003174)	N. Summit St. 39°45′23″N 84°13′08″W	
35	Paul Laurence Dunbar House	Paul Laurence Dunbar House	October 15, 1966 (#66000619)	219 N. Summit St. 39°45′20″N 84°13′08″W	
36	Duncarrick	Duncarrick	June 30, 1983 (#83002010)	Webster and Keowee Sts. 39°46′44″N 84°11′03″W	
37	Eagles Building	Eagles Building	November 4, 1982 (#82001478)	320 S. Main St. 39°45′17″N 84°11′24″W	
38	East Second Street District	East Second Street District	March 7, 1979 (#79001898)	3-27 E. 2nd St. 39°45′40″N 84°11′30″W	Consisted of 6 buildings, all of which have been demolished
39	East Third Street Historic District	East Third Street Historic District	February 2, 2001 (#01000049)	424-520 East 3rd St. (southern side only); 39°45′37″N 84°11′08″W	
40	Engineers Club of Dayton	Engineers Club of Dayton	October 17, 2007 (#07001091)	110 E. Monument Ave. 39°45′49″N 84°11′27″W	
41	Exposition Hall, Montgomery County Fairgrounds	Exposition Hall, Montgomery County Fairgrounds	December 10, 2003 (#03001287)	Montgomery County Fairgrounds, 1043 S. Main St. 39°44′38″N 84°11′20″W	
42	Fifth Street Branch Young Men's Christian Association (YMCA)		May 22, 2026 (#100013041)	907 W. Fifth Street; 39°45′12″N 84°12′33″W	
43	Fire Blocks Historic District	Fire Blocks Historic District	October 15, 1992 (#92001374)	Roughly bounded by Jefferson, 4th, St. Clair, and 2nd Sts. 39°45′30″N 84°11′20″W	
44	First Lutheran Church	First Lutheran Church	March 29, 1983 (#83002011)	138 W. 1st St. 39°45′41″N 84°11′45″W	
45	Philip E. Gilbert Houses	Philip E. Gilbert Houses	August 3, 1979 (#79001899)	1012 Huffman Ave. and 18-30 Belpre Pl. 39°45′27″N 84°09′05″W	
46	Oscar M. Gottschall House	Oscar M. Gottschall House	April 11, 1977 (#77001076)	20 Livingston Ave. 39°45′27″N 84°08′54″W	
47	Grafton-Rockwood Historic District	Grafton-Rockwood Historic District	March 22, 2010 (#10000084)	Parts of Grafton, Homewood, Rockwood Ave, Oaks Ave, Old Orchard Ave. 39°46′24″N 84°12′23″W	
48	Grant-Deneau Tower	Grant-Deneau Tower	February 23, 2016 (#16000044)	40 W. 4th St. 39°45′27″N 84°11′34″W	
49	Graphic Arts Building	Graphic Arts Building	November 12, 2009 (#09000911)	221-223 S. Ludlow St. 39°45′21″N 84°11′35″W	
50	Gummer House	Gummer House	February 17, 1978 (#78002145)	1428 Huffman Ave. 39°45′26″N 84°08′35″W	
51	Hanitch-Huffman House	Hanitch-Huffman House	March 29, 1982 (#82003617)	139 W. Monument Ave. 39°45′47″N 84°11′46″W	Moved in 1982 to 214 W. Monument Ave next to Isaac Pollack House.
52	Holy Cross Lithuanian Roman Catholic Church	Holy Cross Lithuanian Roman Catholic Church	November 5, 1991 (#91001582)	1924 Leo St. 39°46′53″N 84°10′04″W	
53	Huffman Historic District	Huffman Historic District	August 24, 1982 (#82003618)	Roughly bounded by E. 3rd, Hamilton, Van Lear, and Beckel Sts. 39°45′41″N 84°09′59″W	
54	Incinerator Site	Incinerator Site	April 1, 1975 (#75001500)	2301 W. River Rd. 39°42′48″N 84°13′56″W	Also known as SunWatch Indian Village
55	Independent Order of Oddfellows, Dayton Lodge No. 273	Independent Order of Oddfellows, Dayton Lodge No. 273	October 25, 1984 (#84000109)	8 LaBelle St. 39°45′30″N 84°10′23″W	Demolished in 2014
56	Insco Apartments Building	Insco Apartments Building	February 18, 1994 (#93001390)	255 N. Main St. 39°45′48″N 84°11′37″W	
57	Jacob O. Joyce House	Jacob O. Joyce House	November 25, 1983 (#83004321)	6 Josie St. 39°45′21″N 84°10′33″W	
58	Julienne Girls Catholic High School	Julienne Girls Catholic High School	January 8, 2009 (#08001297)	325 Homewood Ave. 39°46′34″N 84°12′17″W	Demolished in 2012.
59	Kelly Family Home	Kelly Family Home	June 30, 1975 (#75001501)	657 S. Main St. 39°44′58″N 84°11′21″W	
60	Lewis Kemp House	Lewis Kemp House	January 23, 1975 (#75001502)	4800 Burkhardt Ave. 39°45′37″N 84°07′33″W	
61	Kenilworth Avenue Historic District	Kenilworth Avenue Historic District	August 9, 2006 (#06000695)	1131-1203 Salem Ave., 701-761 Kenilworth; 39°46′33″N 84°12′58″W	
62	Kossuth Colony Historic District	Kossuth Colony Historic District	December 21, 1979 (#79001900)	Baltimore St., Mack and Notre Dame Aves. 39°47′00″N 84°10′17″W	
63	Benjamin F. Kuhns Building	Benjamin F. Kuhns Building	April 24, 1978 (#78002146)	43 S. Main St. 39°45′29″N 84°11′31″W	
64	Lafee Building	Lafee Building	November 25, 1980 (#80003175)	22 E. 3rd St. 39°45′34″N 84°11′28″W	Facade was dismantled and stored. Later resurrected on S. Main Street as part of the RTA transit hub/American Building
65	Lichliter Mound and Village Site	Lichliter Mound and Village Site	June 4, 1973 (#73001510)	Fields on the northern side of an intermittent stream, 1 mile (1.6 km) above Wolf Creek and 6 miles (9.7 km) above the Great Miami River; 39°46′46″N 84°17′08″W	
66	Linden Recreation and Community Center	Linden Recreation and Community Center	March 26, 2014 (#14000082)	334 Norwood Ave. 39°45′09″N 84°12′26″W	
67	Lindsey Building	Lindsey Building	March 14, 1985 (#85000564)	25 S. Main St. 39°45′31″N 84°11′31″W	
68	McCormick Manufacturing Company Building	McCormick Manufacturing Company Building	February 2, 2001 (#01000050)	434-438 E. 1st St. 39°45′49″N 84°11′03″W	
69	McPherson Town Historic District	McPherson Town Historic District	September 29, 1988 (#88001712)	Roughly bounded by Main St., the Great Miami River, and Interstate 75; 39°46′03″N 84°11′46″W	
70	Memorial Hall	Memorial Hall	July 14, 1988 (#88001062)	125 E. 1st St. 39°45′51″N 84°11′23″W	
71	Miami Valley Golf Course and Clubhouse	Miami Valley Golf Course and Clubhouse	June 30, 2015 (#15000372)	3311 Salem Ave. 39°47′30″N 84°14′15″W	Extends into Harrison Township, elsewhere in Montgomery County
72	Daniel Miller House	Daniel Miller House	May 29, 1975 (#75001504)	3525 Dandridge Ave. 39°45′59″N 84°14′49″W	
73	Montgomery County Courthouse	Montgomery County Courthouse	January 26, 1970 (#70000510)	Northwestern corner of 3rd and Main Sts. 39°45′33″N 84°11′33″W	
74	Jacob H.W. Mumma House	Jacob H.W. Mumma House	May 29, 1980 (#80003176)	2239 Kipling Dr. 39°47′24″N 84°14′37″W	
75	Mutual Home & Savings Association Building	Mutual Home & Savings Association Building	December 16, 1982 (#82001480)	120 W. 2nd St. 39°45′37″N 84°11′43″W	
76	Newcom House	Newcom House	July 21, 1980 (#80003177)	Carillon Historical Park; 39°43′42″N 84°12′02″W	Moved in 2009 from its previous location at 35 Moraine Circle in Kettering
77	Nicholas Ohmer House	Nicholas Ohmer House	October 16, 1974 (#74001580)	1350 Creighton St. 39°44′26″N 84°09′14″W	
78	Old Post Office And Federal Building	Old Post Office And Federal Building	March 10, 1975 (#75001505)	120 W. 3rd St. 39°45′30″N 84°11′41″W	
79	Oregon Historic District	Oregon Historic District	March 27, 1975 (#75001506)	Between Patterson Boulevard and Wayne Ave., north to Gates St. and south to U.S. Route 35; 39°45′19″N 84°11′04″W	
80	Isaac Pollack House	Isaac Pollack House	December 16, 1974 (#74001581)	208 W. Monument Ave. 39°45′46″N 84°11′48″W	
81	Rudolph Pretzinger House	Rudolph Pretzinger House	August 24, 1979 (#79001901)	908 S. Main St; 39°44′45″N 84°11′16″W	
82	Red Oak-William C. Sherman House	Red Oak-William C. Sherman House	September 8, 2000 (#00001064)	1231 Hook Estates Dr. 39°47′43″N 84°14′00″W	
83	John R. Reynolds House	John R. Reynolds House	November 21, 1976 (#76001499)	24 Klee St. 39°45′27″N 84°08′58″W	
84	Rubicon Farm	Rubicon Farm	September 29, 1976 (#76001500)	1815 Brown St. 39°44′04″N 84°10′56″W	
85	Sachs and Pruden Ale Company Building	Sachs and Pruden Ale Company Building	August 12, 1991 (#91000973)	127 Wyandot St. 39°45′30″N 84°11′15″W	Currently houses the Dayton Metro Library's Operations Center. From the 1980s through 2014 it was the long-time home of Hauer Music.
86	Sacred Heart Church	Sacred Heart Church	October 22, 1987 (#87001885)	217 W. 4th St. 39°45′28″N 84°11′43″W	
87	St. Adalbert Polish Catholic Church	St. Adalbert Polish Catholic Church	November 7, 1991 (#91001581)	1511 Valley St. 39°47′01″N 84°09′22″W	
88	Saint Anne's Hill Historic District	Saint Anne's Hill Historic District	June 5, 1986 (#86001214)	Roughly bounded by 4th, McClure, Josie, High, and Dutoit Sts. 39°45′24″N 84°10′23″W	
89	St. Mary Roman Catholic Church	St. Mary Roman Catholic Church	April 21, 1983 (#83002012)	543 Xenia Ave. 39°45′10″N 84°10′04″W	
90	St. Mary's Hall, University of Dayton	St. Mary's Hall, University of Dayton	May 25, 1973 (#73001508)	300 College Park; 39°44′22″N 84°10′41″W	
91	St. Paul Evangelical Lutheran Church and Parish Hall		August 14, 2023 (#100009223)	239 Wayne Ave. 39°45′28″N 84°10′59″W	
92	Santa Clara Business Historic District		December 6, 2024 (#100011127)	1846-1976 N. Main Street, inclusive (both sides of street); 39°46′50″N 84°12′26″W	
93	Hyman Schriber Building	Hyman Schriber Building	May 26, 1988 (#88000667)	306-308 Washington St. 39°45′06″N 84°11′41″W	
94	Shawen Acres	Shawen Acres	October 9, 1991 (#91001487)	3304 N. Main St. 39°47′47″N 84°12′53″W	
95	Sig's General Store	Sig's General Store	August 12, 1991 (#91000974)	1400 Valley St. 39°46′54″N 84°09′30″W	
96	Edwin Smith House	Edwin Smith House	August 13, 1974 (#74001582)	131 W. 3rd St. 39°45′32″N 84°11′42″W	
97	South Park Historic District	South Park Historic District	August 23, 1984 (#84003794)	Roughly bounded by Park, Morton, Hickory, and Wayne Ave.; also roughly bounded by Wayne, Wyoming, Nathan, Oak, Alberta and Blaine; 39°44′56″N 84°10′43″W	Second set of boundaries represents a boundary increase of June 16, 1988
98	Southern Ohio Lunatic Asylum	Southern Ohio Lunatic Asylum	November 15, 1979 (#79001902)	2335 Wayne Ave. 39°44′16″N 84°09′40″W	
99	Squirrel-Forest Historic District	Squirrel-Forest Historic District	October 14, 2010 (#10000827)	North of Homewood Ave. and along the west side of Forest Ave. 39°46′27″N 84°12′08″W	
100	Steele's Hill-Grafton Hill Historic District	Steele's Hill-Grafton Hill Historic District	June 5, 1986 (#86001237)	Roughly bounded by Grand, Plymouth, Forest, and Salem; 39°45′59″N 84°12′15″W	A boundary increase was approved December 18, 2023.
101	John S. Stengel House	John S. Stengel House	April 21, 1983 (#83002013)	325 W. 2nd St. 39°45′37″N 84°11′52″W	Demolished
102	Stivers High School	Stivers High School	August 17, 2001 (#01000896)	1313 E. 5th St. 39°45′31″N 84°10′32″W	
103	Summit Street Young Women's Christian Association (YWCA)		January 16, 2020 (#100004870)	236 South Paul Laurence Dunbar St. 39°45′08″N 84°13′05″W	
104	Traxler Mansion	Traxler Mansion	April 24, 1979 (#79001903)	42 Yale Ave. 39°46′14″N 84°12′54″W	Demolished in 2023
105	Underwood-Talmage Company		September 8, 2025 (#100012208)	620 Geyer Street; 39°46′27″N 84°12′01″W	
106	Unit III, Dayton Project	Unit III, Dayton Project	June 7, 2006 (#06000480)	1601 W. 1st St. 39°45′25″N 84°13′19″W	
107	United Brethren Publishing House	United Brethren Publishing House	December 10, 1993 (#93001391)	40-46 S. Main St. (7-21 E. 4th St.); 39°45′30″N 84°11′29″W	
108	Victory Theater Building	Victory Theater Building	June 22, 1972 (#72001037)	138 N. Main St. 39°45′42″N 84°11′32″W	
109	Dr. Jefferson A. Walters House	Dr. Jefferson A. Walters House	November 20, 1974 (#74001583)	35 E. 1st St. 39°45′46″N 84°11′29″W	
110	West Third Street Historic District	West Third Street Historic District	January 25, 1989 (#88003194)	Roughly W. 3rd St. between Broadway and Shannon St. 39°45′21″N 84°12′43″W	
111	Westbrock Funeral Home	Westbrock Funeral Home	March 10, 1988 (#88000205)	1712 Wayne Ave. 39°44′41″N 84°10′06″W	
112	Weustoff and Getz Company	Weustoff and Getz Company	September 3, 2014 (#14000547)	210 Wayne Ave. 39°45′31″N 84°11′00″W	
113	Women's Christian Association	Women's Christian Association	May 13, 1976 (#76001501)	800 W. 5th St. 39°45′11″N 84°12′28″W	Razed in November 2007
114	Woodland Cemetery Association of Dayton Historic District	Woodland Cemetery Association of Dayton Historic District	November 22, 2011 (#11000855)	118 Woodland Ave. 39°44′38″N 84°10′30″W	
115	Woodland Cemetery Gateway, Chapel and Office	Woodland Cemetery Gateway, Chapel and Office	November 30, 1978 (#78002147)	118 Woodland Ave. 39°44′34″N 84°10′45″W	
116	Wright Company Factory	Wright Company Factory	September 9, 2019 (#100004355)	2701 Home Ave., Dayton Aviation Heritage National Historical Park; 39°44′50″N 84°14′20″W	
117	Wright Cycle Company-Wright and Wright Printing Offices	Wright Cycle Company-Wright and Wright Printing Offices	February 13, 1986 (#86000236)	22 S. Williams St. 39°45′13″N 84°12′43″W	
118	Wright Flyer III	Wright Flyer III	June 21, 1990 (#90001747)	Carillon Park, 2001 S. Patterson Boulevard; 39°43′40″N 84°12′07″W	

== Former listings ==
	Name on the Register	Image	Date listed	Date removed	Location	Description
1	Classic Theater	Classic Theater	February 10, 1975 (#75001496)	January 31, 1995	815 W. 5th St. 39°45′12″N 84°12′30″W	Demolished in October 1991.
2	Orville Wright Laboratory		April 13, 1973 (#73001509)	February 20, 1980	15 N. Broadway	

== See also ==
- List of National Historic Landmarks in Ohio
- National Register of Historic Places listings in Ohio
