= Central Avenue Historic District (Dayton, Ohio) =

Historic district in Ohio, United States

- U.S. National Register of Historic Places
- U.S. Historic district
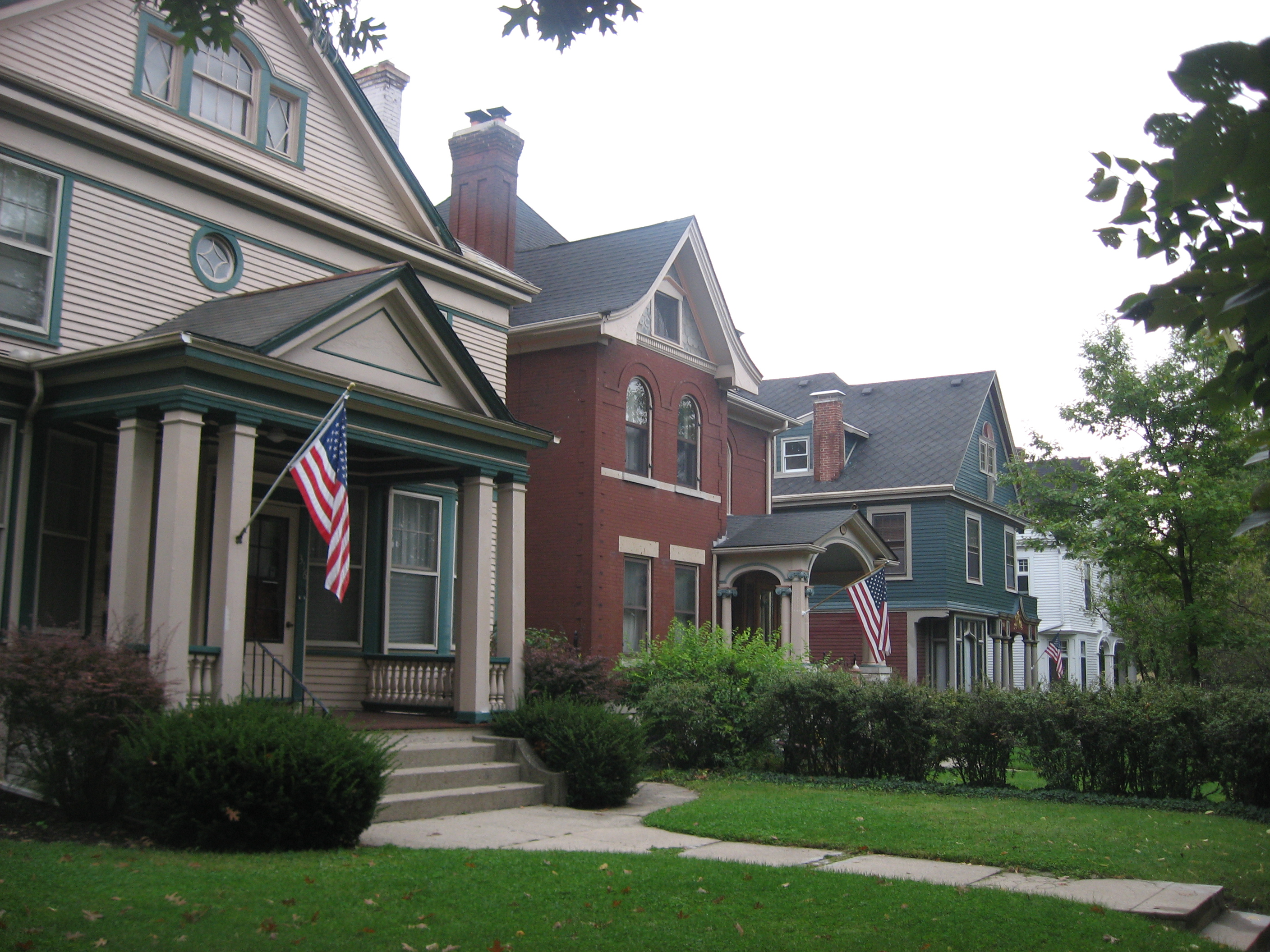
- Houses in the district

- Location within Ohio Location within the United States
- Location: 201-338 Central Ave., Dayton, Ohio
- Coordinates: 39°46′2″N 84°12′27″W
- Area: 8 acres (3.2 ha)
- Architectural style: Late 19th And 20th Century Revivals, Late Victorian
- NRHP reference No.: 82001476
- Added to NRHP: December 16, 1982

The Central Avenue Historic District is a small segment of the larger Grafton Hill neighborhood of Dayton, Ohio, United States. Composed of just two blocks near the border between Grafton Hill and Dayton View, the historic district comprises a cohesive collection of houses dating primarily from the turn of the 20th century, and it has been named a historic site.

Central Avenue is a prominent example of Dayton's earliest suburbanizing trends, having been built for people who were leaving the original boundaries of the city in and around what is now downtown, along the Great Miami River. At this time, around the end of the 19th century and the beginning of the 20th, Dayton was undergoing rapid increases in population and commerce, due to unprecedented industrial growth. As a result, those who were leaving the older parts of the city and moving to Central Avenue were the nouveau riche, who were becoming rich for the first time as a result of wise investment in the city's booming industries.

The historic district comprises nineteen buildings: eighteen contributing and one non-contributing. Primarily built as single-family houses, the buildings in the district lie along both sides of Central Avenue both north and south of its intersection with Federal Street, but in no direction does the district extend more than one block from the Federal-Central intersection: parts of Central in these two blocks, as well as all territory to the north, east, and south, comprise Grafton Hill's historic district, and a small non-historic strip is located along Salem Avenue, separating Grafton Hill from the larger Dayton View Historic District farther west. Its identity is not always kept separate from Grafton Hill; some community events, such as walking tours, lump these two blocks of Central Avenue with the surrounding neighborhood.

Central Avenue was built at the height of the Victorian era in architecture, and many of the houses display Victorian styles such as Queen Anne, although later modes such as bungalows can also be found. The district's most prominent houses, located at 240 and 338 Central, are both Queen Annes. The built environment on Central Avenue has been well preserved to the point that the neighborhood was designated a historic district and listed on the National Register of Historic Places one week before Christmas 1982. Since that time, the neighborhood has gained further recognition via community-organized walking tours and from Preservation Dayton, which recognized two homeowners for their restoration of the house at 330 Central Avenue.

== See also ==
- National Register of Historic Places listings in Dayton, Ohio
