= Kenilworth Avenue Historic District =

Historic district in Ohio, United States

- U.S. National Register of Historic Places
- U.S. Historic district
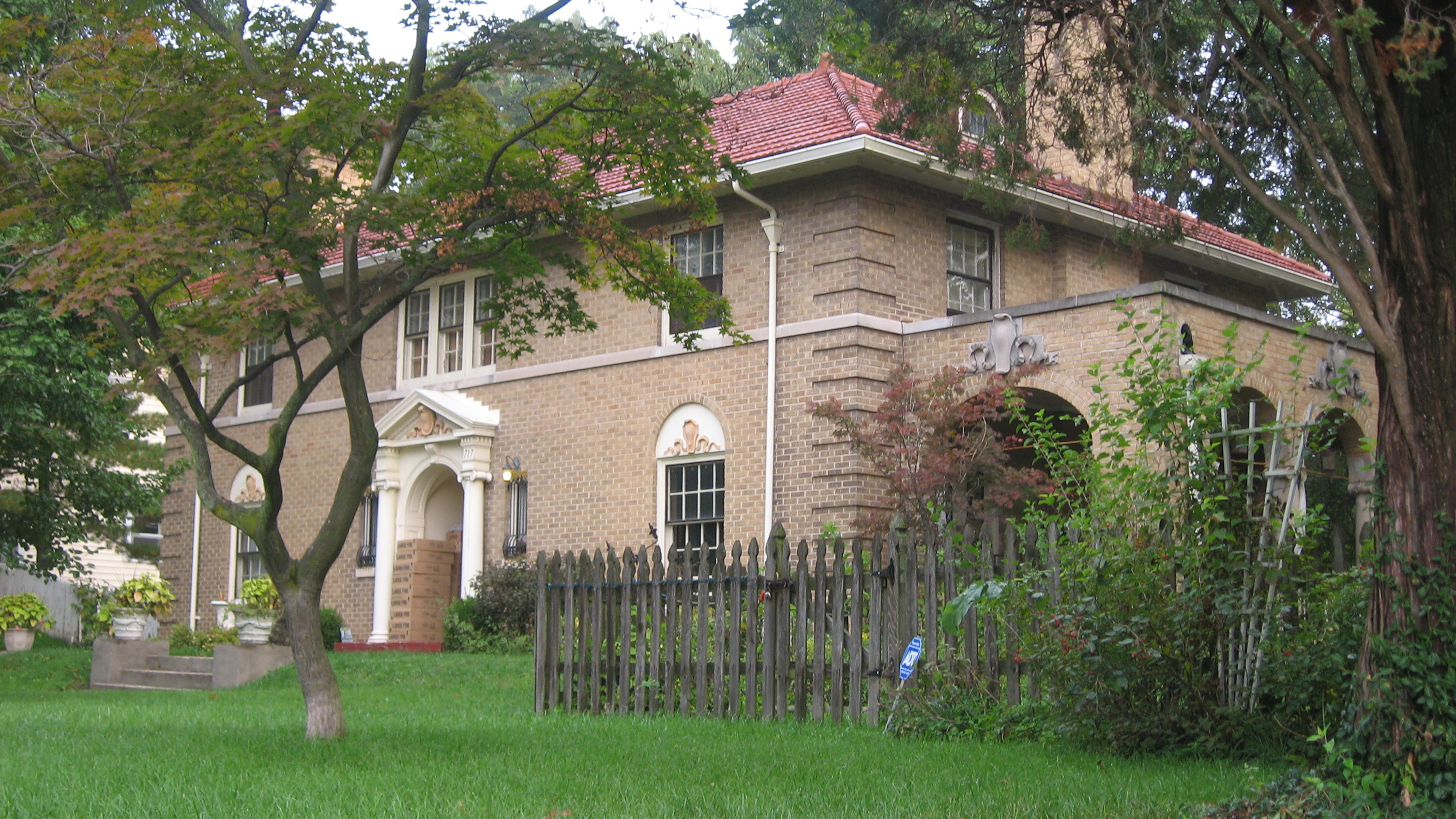
- A house in the district

- Location within Ohio Location within the United States
- Location: 1131-1203 Salem Ave. and 701-761 Kenilworth, Dayton, Ohio
- Coordinates: 39°46′33″N 84°12′58″W
- Area: 6.5 acres (2.6 ha)
- Built: 1903
- Architectural style: Tudor Revival, Neoclassical
- NRHP reference No.: 06000695
- Added to NRHP: August 9, 2006

The Kenilworth Avenue Historic District is a historic district in the northwestern portion of Dayton, Ohio, United States. Composed largely of houses constructed after the Great Flood of 1913, the district features examples of several prominent architectural styles, and it has received both local and federal recognition.

Following the 1913 flood, many wealthy residents decided to flee the older parts of the city, located in the floodplain along the Great Miami River. The result was the development of Kenilworth Avenue, whose houses feature a range of design modes, including the Italianate, Tudor Revival, Colonial Revival, and Neoclassical styles. Also known as "Dayton View Heights" (the district is just three blocks north of the larger Dayton View Historic District), the Kenilworth Avenue development includes twenty separate buildings, located on both sides of the street from Redfern Avenue west to its end at Salem Avenue. Seventeen of these buildings qualified as contributing properties to the district, while three were considered non-contributing: the district's period of significance was held to have ended in 1949, and some of the buildings were constructed in the 1950s and 1960s. Among the oldest properties in the district is the house at the corner of Kenilworth and Salem, which was constructed in 1906. When the street was developed, many of the new residents desired to live in a park-like setting, and as a result, the street's well-preserved landscaping is itself a significant part of the historic district.

On March 1, 2006, Dayton City Commission modified the neighborhood's zoning classification by designating the area a local historic district, and it was subsequently added to the National Register of Historic Places five months later. Federal designation places no restrictions on the residents' abilities to modify or destroy buildings in the district, but local designation means that local authorities must approve changes to the district's properties. When designated, Kenilworth Avenue was the city's twelfth official historic district, and its eighteenth National Register district. It is one of six northwest-side historic districts, along with Dayton View, Grafton-Rockwood, Squirrel-Forest, McPherson Town, and Steele's Hill-Grafton Hill.

== See also ==
- National Register of Historic Places listings in Dayton, Ohio
