= Kenilworth Avenue =

Kenilworth Avenue may refer to:

== Canada ==
- Kenilworth Avenue (Hamilton, Ontario)

== United States ==
- Maryland Route 201, also known as Kenilworth Avenue
- District of Columbia Route 295, also known as the Kenilworth Avenue Freeway
- Kenilworth Avenue Historic District, Dayton, Ohio
