= Kelly Family (disambiguation) =

The Kelly Family is an American-European music group.

Kelly Family may also refer to:

- The Kelly Family (serial killers), an American family of serial killers
- Kelly Family Home, a house in Ohio, United States
- The Kelly Family, a prominent family in Philadelphia, Pennsylvania, United States:
  - Walter C. Kelly (1873–1938)
  - George Kelly (playwright) (1887–1974)
  - Jack Kelly Sr. (rower) (1889–1960)
  - Jack Kelly Jr. (rower) (1927–1985)
  - Grace Kelly (1929–1982)
- The Irish-Australian Kelly family, originally from County Tipperary:
  - Ned Kelly
  - Dan Kelly (brother)
  - Kate Kelly (sister)
  - Canon Edmond Kelly (cousin)
