= Isaac Pollack House =

- U.S. National Register of Historic Places
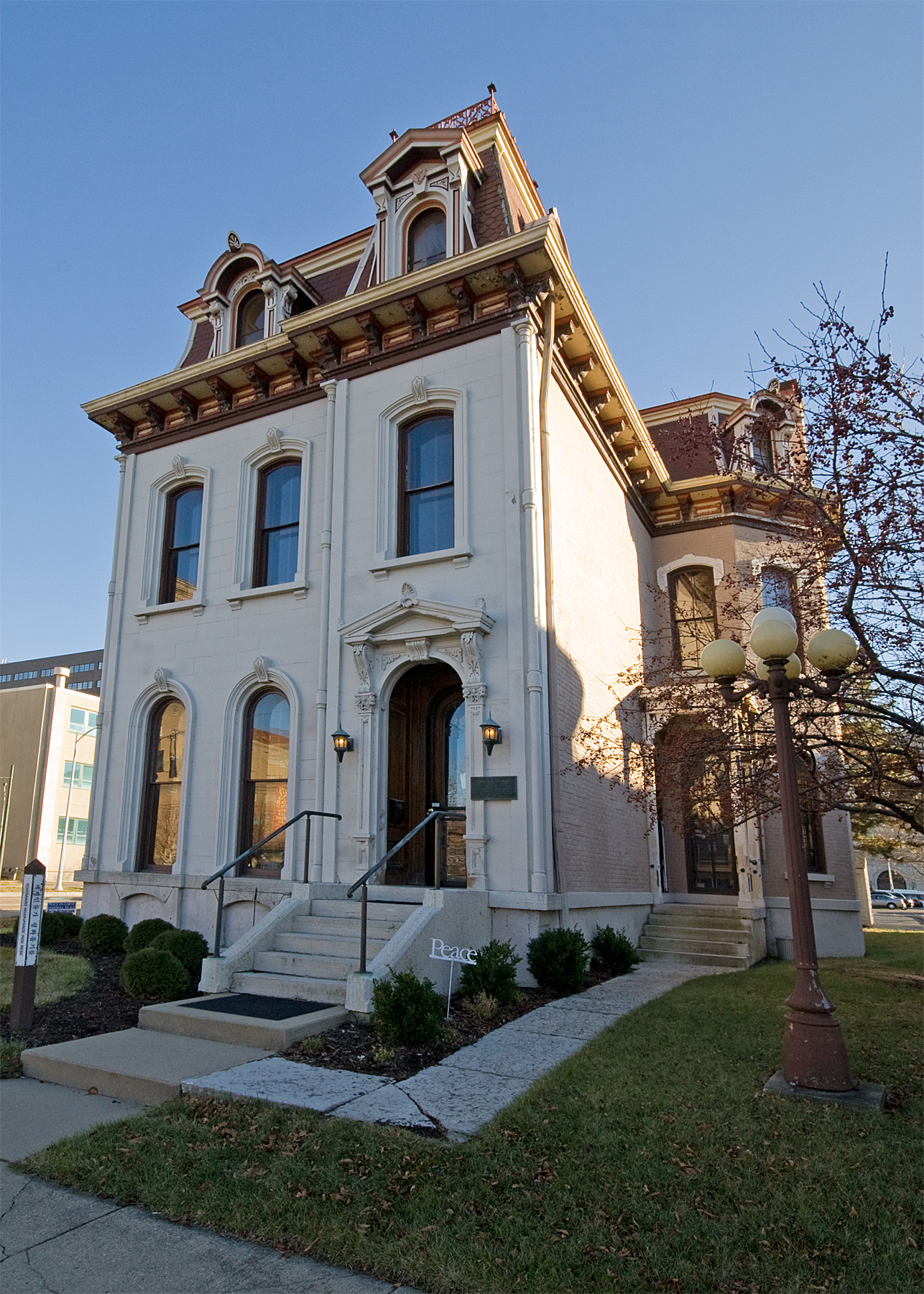
- Front in 2008

- Location within Ohio Location within the United States
- Location: 208 W. Monument Ave., Dayton, Ohio
- Coordinates: 39°45′46″N 84°11′48″W
- Area: Less than 1 acre (0.40 ha)
- Built: 1876
- Architectural style: Second Empire
- NRHP reference No.: 74001581
- Added to NRHP: December 16, 1974

The Isaac Pollack House is a historic structure now located at 208 West Monument Avenue in Dayton, Ohio, United States. Built in 1876, this Second Empire house was originally home to the family of Isaac Pollack, a prominent Dayton businessman involved in the liqueur trade. The walls are composed of a mixture of stone and brick with some wooden elements, resting on a stone foundation and covered with a slate roof.

The house ceased to be used primarily as a residence in 1913. In that year, Fenton T. Bott purchased the house and began using it as the home of his Bott Dancing Academy, as well as his residence; he remained in business until 1941. Fifteen years later, the Montgomery County Board of Elections began a twenty-year period of using the property as their offices. In 1979, the house was moved from its previous location at 319 West Third Street to a new location at the intersection of Wilkinson Street and Monument Avenue. Its new location places it on the northern edge of downtown, just one block from the Great Miami River, across from McPherson Town, and near Interstate 75. From October 14, 2005, to September 2021, the structure was the home of the Dayton International Peace Museum.

Two weeks before Christmas 1974, the Pollack House was listed on the National Register of Historic Places, qualifying both because of its architecture and because of its place as the residence of a prominent local citizen. It is one of approximately one hundred National Register-listed locations citywide and one of four on Monument Avenue, along with the old YMCA, the Engineers Club of Dayton, and neighboring Hanitch-Huffman House moved in 1982.

== See also ==
- National Register of Historic Places listings in Dayton, Ohio
