= McCormick Manufacturing Company Building =

- U.S. National Register of Historic Places
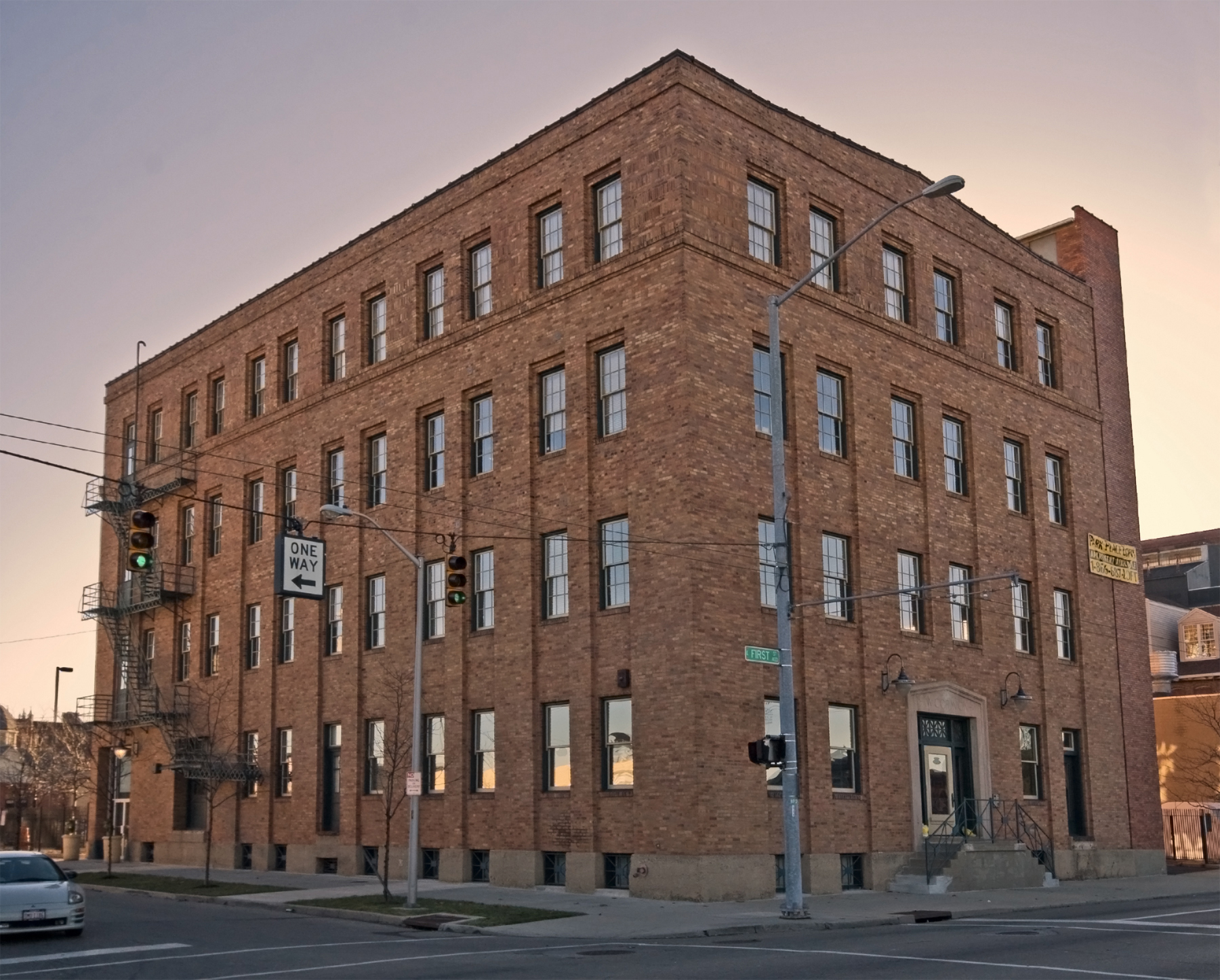

- Location within Ohio Location within the United States
- Location: 434–438 E. First St., Dayton, Ohio
- Coordinates: 39°45′49″N 84°11′3″W
- Architectural style: Early Commercial
- NRHP reference No.: 01000050
- Added to NRHP: February 2, 2001

The McCormick Manufacturing Company Building is a historic structure located in Dayton, Ohio, USA. It was added to the National Register of Historic Places on February 2, 2001.

== See also ==
- National Register of Historic Places listings in Dayton, Ohio
