= Benjamin F. Kuhns Building =

- U.S. National Register of Historic Places
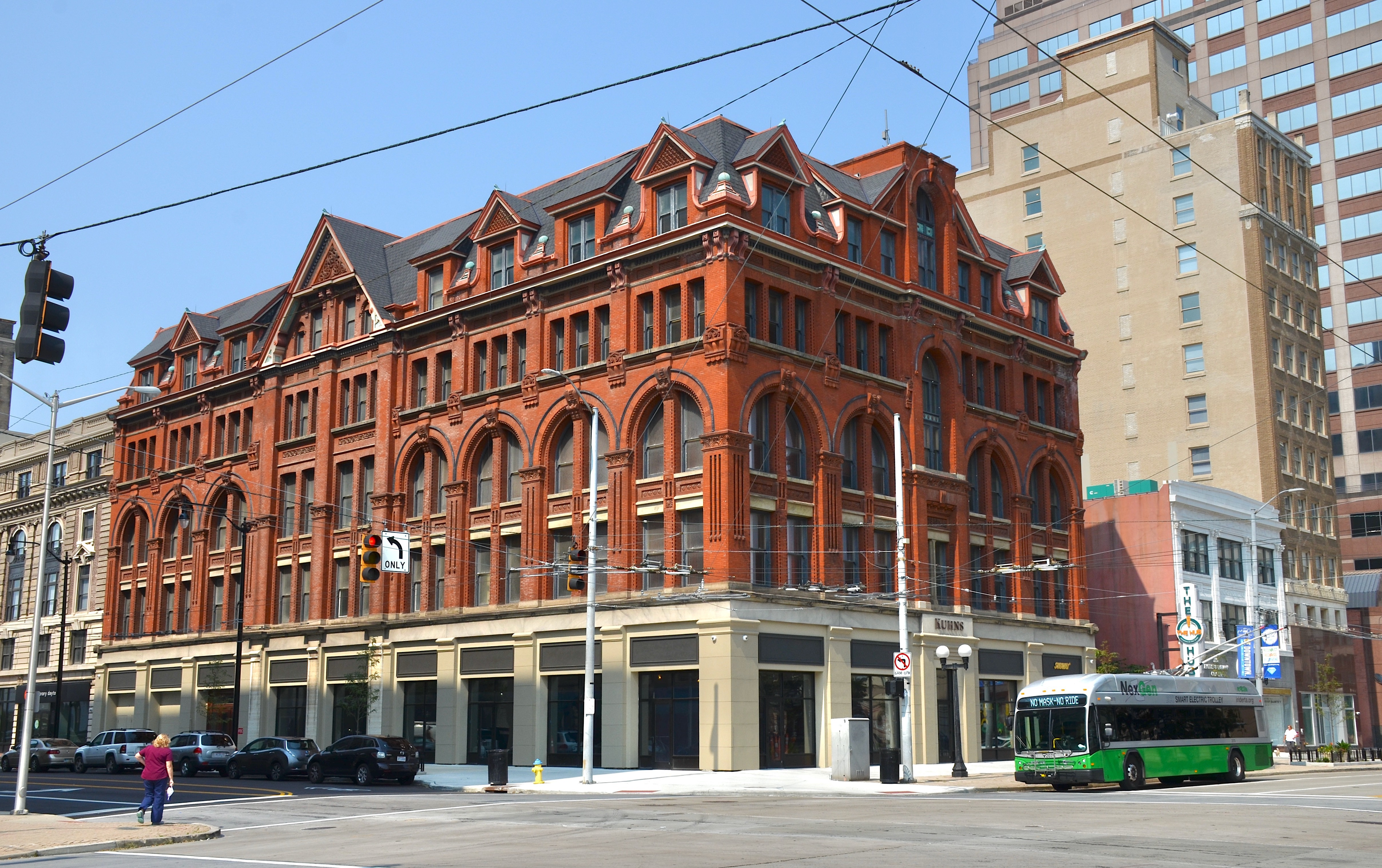
- Viewed from the southeast in 2021

- Location within Ohio Location within the United States
- Location: 43 S. Main St., Dayton, Ohio
- Coordinates: 39°45′30″N 84°11′31″W
- Area: 1 acre (0.40 ha)
- Built: 1883
- Architect: Peters & Burns; Beaver & Butt
- Architectural style: Romanesque Revival
- NRHP reference No.: 78002146
- Added to NRHP: April 24, 1978

The Benjamin F. Kuhns Building is a historic commercial building on Main Street in downtown Dayton, Ohio, United States. Distinguished by its little-modified late nineteenth-century architecture, it has been named a historic site.

Built of brick covered with a slate roof, the Romanesque Revival building features elements of stone and terracotta. Its facade is divided into five bays, each of which features a large arch, while the street-facing southern side is functionally a larger form of the facade. The building was designed by Peters and Burns, a Dayton-based architectural company, and constructed under the direction of Dayton contractors Beaver and Butt. During the building's early years, it was home to companies such as the Manhattan Clothing Store and Oleman's Department Store, which maintained premises there in the 1890s and 1910s respectively. However, the building was not always used for commercial purposes; an arts school operated in the building during the 1888-1889 schoolyear. Among the building's interior features is a mail chute, which according to local lore is one of the earliest installed in any building nationwide.

Benjamin Kuhns, the building's namesake, moved from Lancaster, Pennsylvania to Dayton in 1855 at the age of thirty. By his fiftieth birthday, Kuhns was a prominent industrialist, having taken a small Dayton firm and turned it into a prominent manufacturer of agricultural equipment. He was also a prominent philanthropist, having been one of the primary founders of Miami Valley Hospital.

The Benjamin Kuhns Building was listed on the National Register of Historic Places in April 1978, qualifying because of its historically significant architecture. By the early twenty-first century, the Kuhns Building had undergone a highly successful redevelopment process, but like the Kettering Tower and several other downtown buildings, it experienced foreclosure in 2010 after the corporation that owned it fell behind on the mortgage and on property taxes. In 2019, it was sold by the city of Dayton to a developer.

== See also ==
- National Register of Historic Places listings in Dayton, Ohio
