= Shawen Acres =

- U.S. National Register of Historic Places
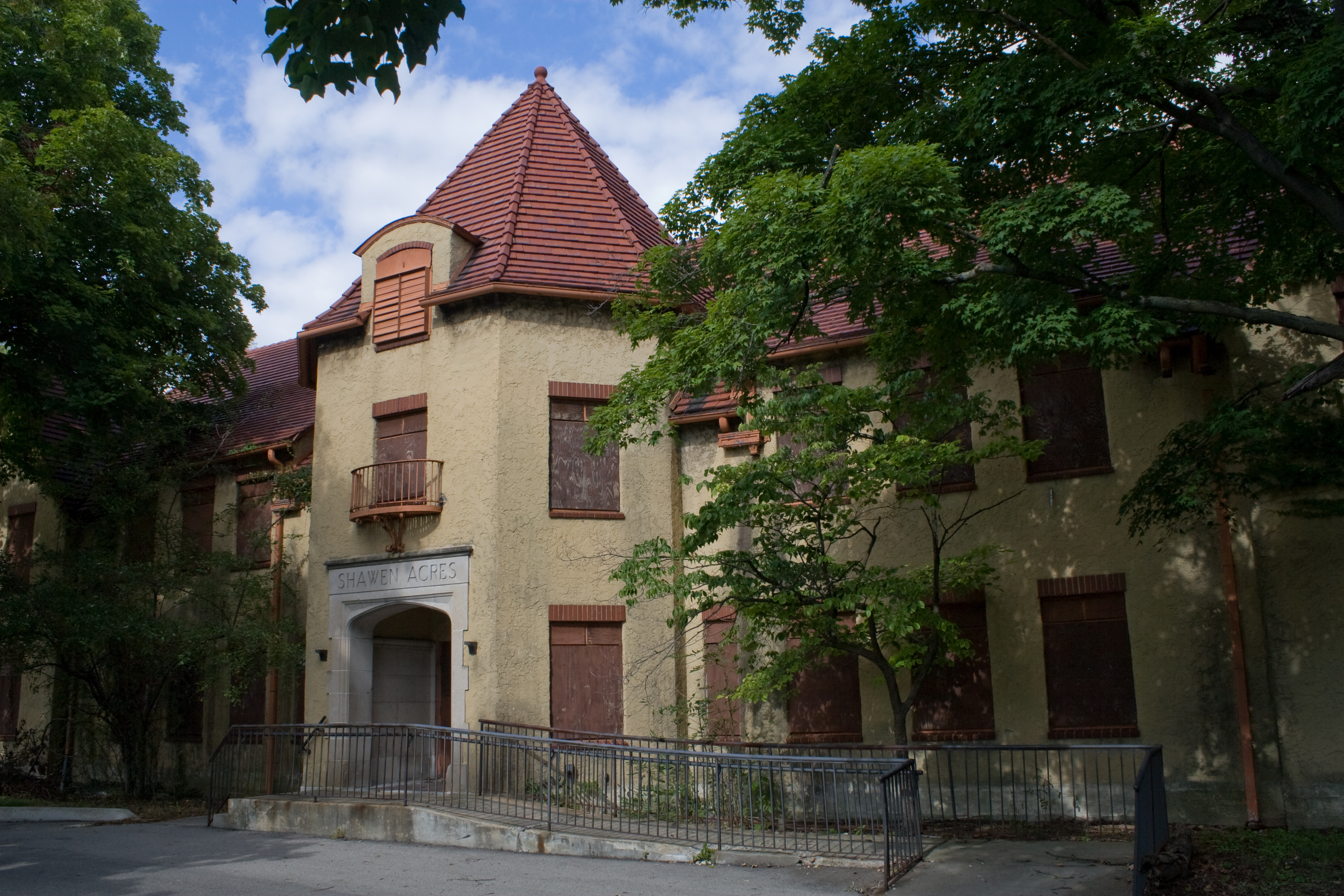

- Location within Ohio Location within the United States
- Location: 3304 N. Main St., Dayton, Ohio
- Coordinates: 39°47′47″N 84°12′53″W
- Built: 1926–1927
- Architectural style: Tudor Revival
- NRHP reference No.: 91001487
- Added to NRHP: October 9, 1991

Shawen Acres, also known as the Montgomery County Children's Home, is a historic complex in Dayton, Ohio. It was added to the National Register of Historic Places on October 9, 1991.

It was originally designed as an orphans home. Dr. Charles Shawen donated 19 acres (77,000 m^{2}) to the county March 21, 1926 for "wayward and homeless children." The complex comprises a main building, annex, gym, and 10 English-style cottages in a park-like setting.

== See also ==
- National Register of Historic Places listings in Dayton, Ohio
