= Lindsey Building =

- U.S. National Register of Historic Places
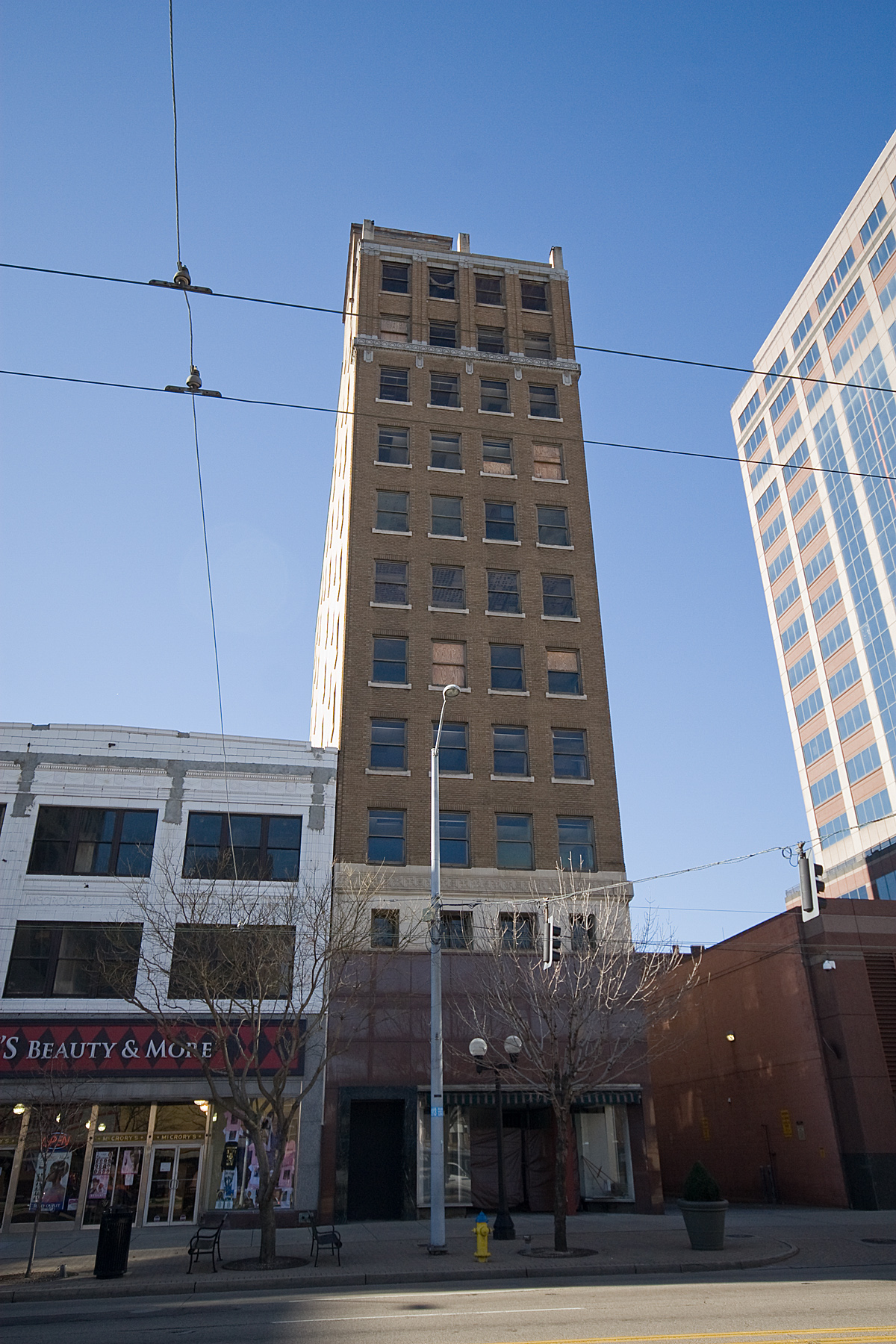
- Front of the building on an afternoon in the winter

- Location within Ohio Location within the United States
- Location: 25 S. Main St., Dayton, Ohio
- Coordinates: 39°45′31.3″N 84°11′31.1″W
- Area: Less than 1 acre (0.40 ha)
- Built: 1917
- Architectural style: Chicago, The Commercial Style
- NRHP reference No.: 85000564
- Added to NRHP: March 14, 1985

The Lindsey Building is a historic commercial building in the downtown section of the city of Dayton, Ohio, United States. Built in the early twentieth century, the Lindsey has been named a historic site.

Constructed of brick on a stone foundation, the Lindsey Building's architecture is typical of commercial buildings erected in the early twentieth century. Some of its more distinctive components are Neoclassical, including its three-part facade and some of its smaller details. Twelve stories tall, the building has been modified to include room for modern-styled shops on its first two floors; the main entrance is located in a recessed area to the right (from the perspective of someone inside the building) of the shop space. It was renovated to new apartments as part of the city block revitialation of the Dayton Arcade.

Built for Theodore Lindsey, the Lindsey Building was constructed in 1917 at a time when Dayton was highly prosperous. During the late 1910s, the downtown was experiencing sustained growth, and numerous commercial buildings such as the Lindsey were being constructed. For much of its history, it has housed financial institutions, including the Miami Savings and Loan Company and the Mutual Home and Savings Association.

In 1985, the Lindsey Building was listed on the National Register of Historic Places; by the early 2010s, it was one of approximately one hundred such locations in the city of Dayton. It qualified for designation in two separate ways: because of its architecture, and because of its place in local history, for it was deemed a leading example of the downtown's expansion in the early twentieth century.

== See also ==
- National Register of Historic Places listings in Dayton, Ohio
