= Lewis Kemp House =

Historic house in Ohio, United States

- U.S. National Register of Historic Places
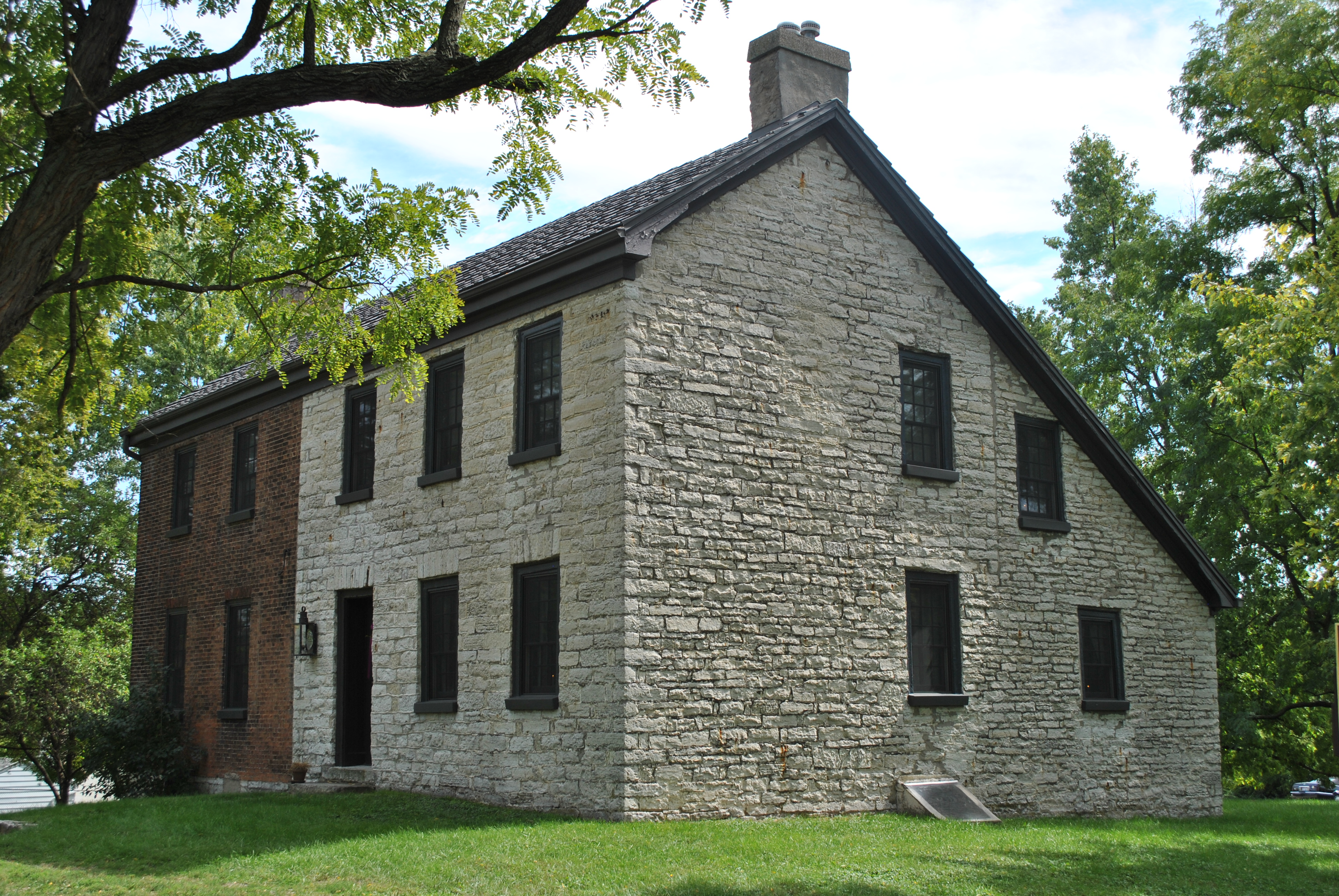
- View of the house from the west

- Location within Ohio Location within the United States
- Location: 4800 Burkhardt Ave., Dayton, Ohio
- Coordinates: 39°45′36.5″N 84°7′33″W
- Area: Less than 1 acre (0.40 ha)
- Built: 1806
- Architectural style: Saltbox
- NRHP reference No.: 75001502
- Added to NRHP: January 23, 1975

The Lewis Kemp House is a historic pioneer farmstead in the city of Dayton, Ohio, United States. Built for one of the area's earliest residents, it was a religious center in its first years, while later years saw its expansion to its present form. Now located among much newer houses, it is Dayton's oldest surviving residence, and it has been named a historic site.

== Kemp family ==
In 1805, a large colony from Frederick County, Maryland settled within Mad River Township; among the ninety-six individuals was Lewis Kemp, who purchased land near the center of the township and in its southwestern region. Within a few years, Kemp relinquished some portions of his property, conveying a piece of land via general warranty deed to local school trustees for the construction of a schoolhouse in 1815, and another 1 acre (0.40 ha) he donated for cemetery purposes in 1815, but on the residue he continue to reside on the old homestead until his death at the age of 88. Kemp was an active member of the United Brethren Church; starting in 1810, Brethren minister Christian Newcomer would hold meetings on Kemp's farm whenever he visited the Dayton area.

== House ==
Kemp's house is built of brick and limestone with a stone foundation; it is covered with an asphalt roof, and peripheral elements are made of wood and stone. The original portion of the house was constructed in 1806, almost as soon as Kemp and his family reached their new farm, while the brick section was constructed in approximately 1832. Although built of stone, the house is a saltbox and displays the characteristics of the style, including the long sloping rear roof.

== Preservation ==
Today, the Kemp House sits in a suburban neighborhood at the junction of Burkhardt Avenue with Meyers Avenue; it is within the city of Dayton, although the city limits of Riverside include some of the adjacent properties. As the oldest house in Dayton, it was added to the National Register of Historic Places in early 1975, qualifying both because of its architecture and because it was the home of a leading local citizen. When it was given this designation, it was one of 11 such locations within Dayton, but the city's National Register list now embraces over 100 different places.

== See also ==
- National Register of Historic Places listings in Dayton, Ohio
