= Dayton Woman's Club =

- Dayton Women's Club
- U.S. National Register of Historic Places
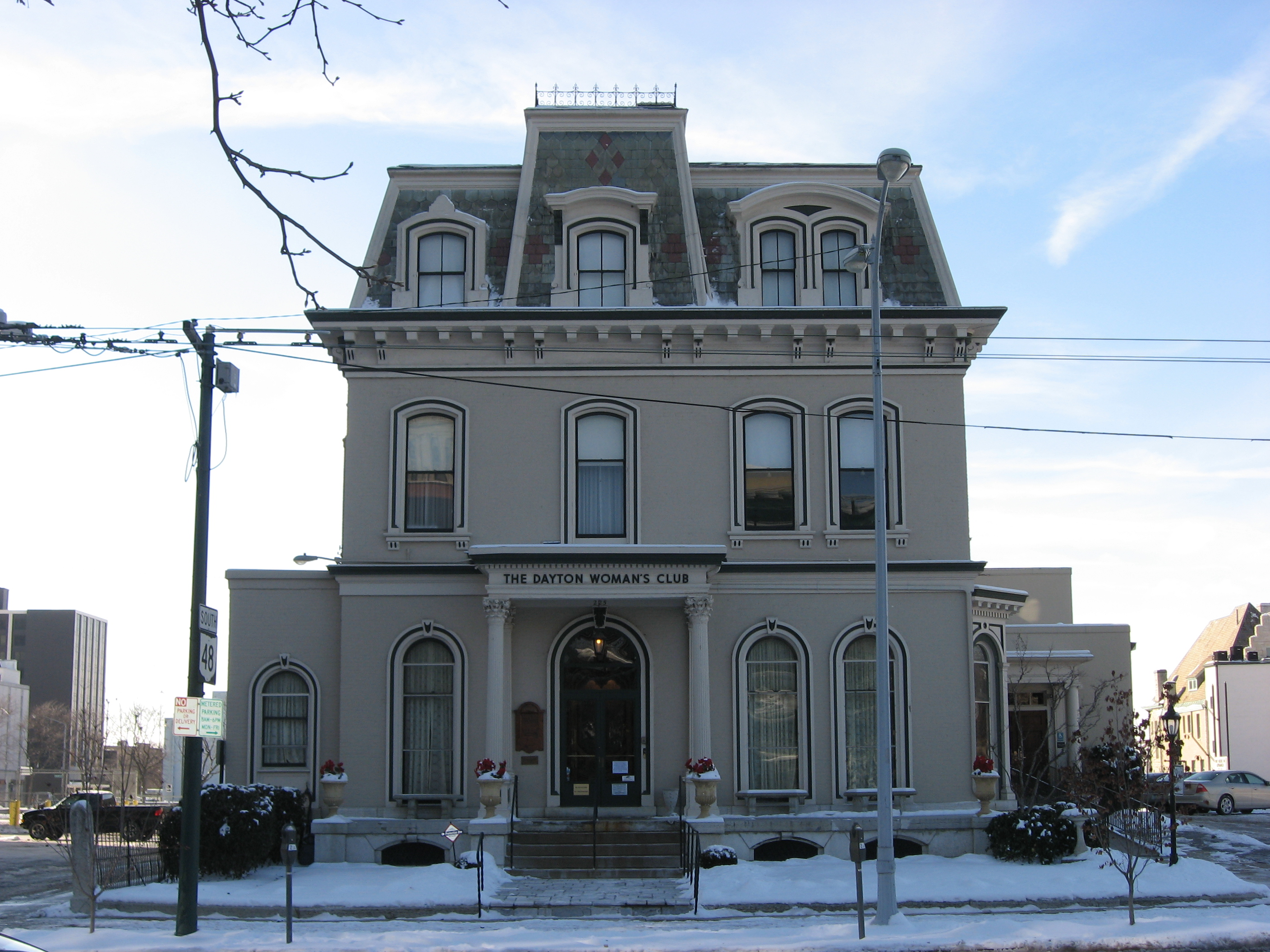

- Location within Ohio
- Location: 225 N. Ludlow Street, Dayton, Ohio
- Coordinates: 39.762778°N 84.195°W
- Architectural style: Classic Revival
- NRHP reference No.: 75001499
- Added to NRHP: February 24, 1975

The Dayton Woman's Club refers to a women's club founded in 1916 and a landmark building on 225 North Ludlow Street in Dayton, Ohio, United States.

== Dayton Woman's Club ==
The Dayton Woman's Club was founded and incorporated in 1916. The club provided a social center for women and one of its first tasks was to raise funds to purchase the mansion on 225 North Ludlow Street as a clubhouse. The club is involved with philanthropic and educational work as well as the preservation of the property. In 2006, the Dayton Woman's Club began admitting men into its organization.

== Building ==
The Dayton Woman's Club building was built in the 1840s for Robert W. Steele, who subsequently sold the house to Napoleon Bonapart Darst in the 1860s. At that time the building underwent extensive renovations, changing the style from Classic Revival to Second Empire style. The Dayton Woman's Club began its fundraising campaign to purchase the building in 1916, raising the $5,000 down payment. In 1918 an addition of 21 rooms was constructed which provided housing for "ladies of good character." In the early 1980s the last tenant left and the space was once again reconfigured.

The Dayton Woman's Club building was added to the list of National Register of Historic Places in 1975, using the spelling "Dayton Women's Club".

== See also ==
- National Register of Historic Places listings in Dayton, Ohio
