= Samuel N. Brown House =

Historic house in Ohio, United States

- U.S. National Register of Historic Places
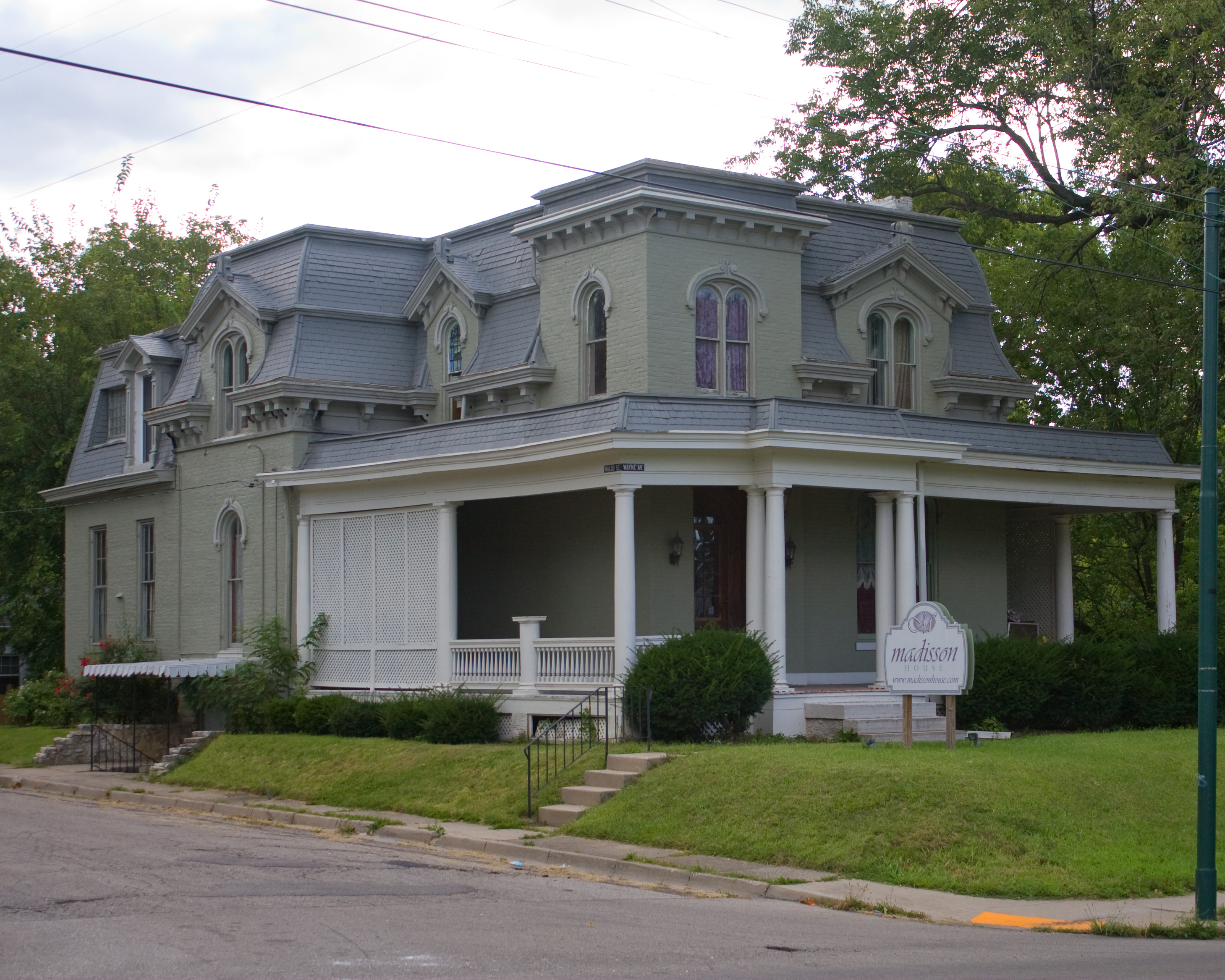
- Front and southern side

- Location within Ohio Location within the United States
- Location: 1633 Wayne Ave., Dayton, Ohio
- Coordinates: 39°44′42″N 84°10′11″W
- Area: Less than 1 acre (0.40 ha)
- Built: 1875
- Architectural style: Second Empire
- NRHP reference No.: 77001075
- Added to NRHP: April 11, 1977

The Samuel N. Brown House is a historic residence in southern Dayton, Ohio, United States. Constructed in the 1870s for a prominent industrialist, it has been used for commercial purposes since the 1920s, and it has been named a historic site.

Samuel N. Brown, the original resident, was the owner of the Dayton-based firm of S.N. Brown and Company. Founded in 1847, it produced parts for horse-drawn vehicles including wheels. Brown arranged in 1875 for the construction of the house, which was sold to a local hospital in 1920 and operated it until their bankruptcy in 1923. Much of its history has been spent as the location of an antique shop, although for a time in the 2000s it was used by Madisson House, a garment shop.

The Brown House rests on a stone foundation and is covered with an asphalt roof; some sections of the walls are weatherboarded. Built in the shape of the letter "T", the house features components such as a tower at the left of the facade, a prominent mansard roof, and a veranda placed around the whole facade. Under the roof, the eaves feature a cornice composed of brackets with frieze. The house is a two-story structure with numerous dormer windows piercing the roof, most of them arched, while the first floor includes tall rectangular windows and some smaller square windows along with arches. Among the smaller details, yet still prominent, is the railing surrounding the top of the tower. Together, these elements produce the appearance of a Second Empire residence.

In 1977, the Brown House was listed on the National Register of Historic Places, qualifying because of its historically significant architecture and because of its connection to Samuel Brown. Another National Register-listed property, the Westbrock Funeral Home, is located across the street.

== See also ==
- National Register of Historic Places listings in Dayton, Ohio
