= St. Adalbert Polish Catholic Church =

Historic church in Ohio, United States

- U.S. National Register of Historic Places
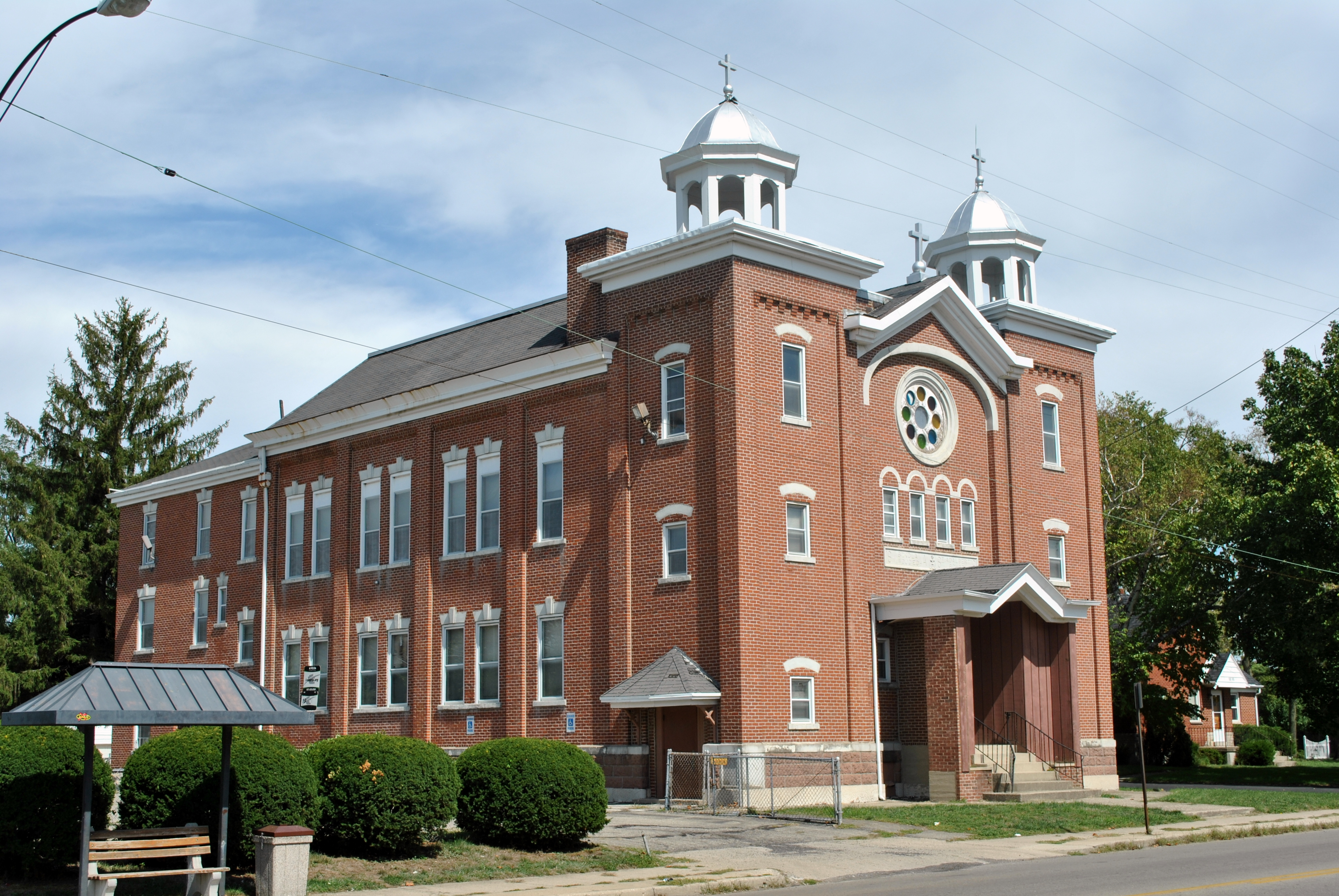

- Location within Ohio Location within the United States
- Location: 1511 Valley St., Dayton, Ohio
- Coordinates: 39°47′1″N 84°9′22″W
- Area: less than one acre
- Built: 1904
- Architect: Frank Sutter
- Architectural style: Classical Revival, Romanesque
- MPS: European Ethnic Communities, Dayton MPS
- NRHP reference No.: 91001581
- Added to NRHP: November 7, 1991

St. Adalbert Polish Catholic Church is a historic church at 1511 Valley Street in Dayton, Ohio.

On Sunday, April 30, 1905,St. Adalbert Church was dedicated by Archbishop Henry K. Moeller of Cincinnati.

In 1954, parishioners build a new rectory and grotto shrine at the church.

In 1961, preparations began for the building of a new St. Adalbert's church. On Holy Thursday, March 23, 1967, the first mass was held at the new church. It was dedicated on the Feast of St. Adalbert, April 23, 1967.

In 2016, the old church building was sold by the Archdiocese of Cincinnati and converted into a madrasah for the neighboring Diyanet mosque

== See also ==
- National Register of Historic Places listings in Dayton, Ohio
