= Montgomery County Courthouse (Ohio) =

Historic courthouse in Ohio, US

- U.S. National Register of Historic Places
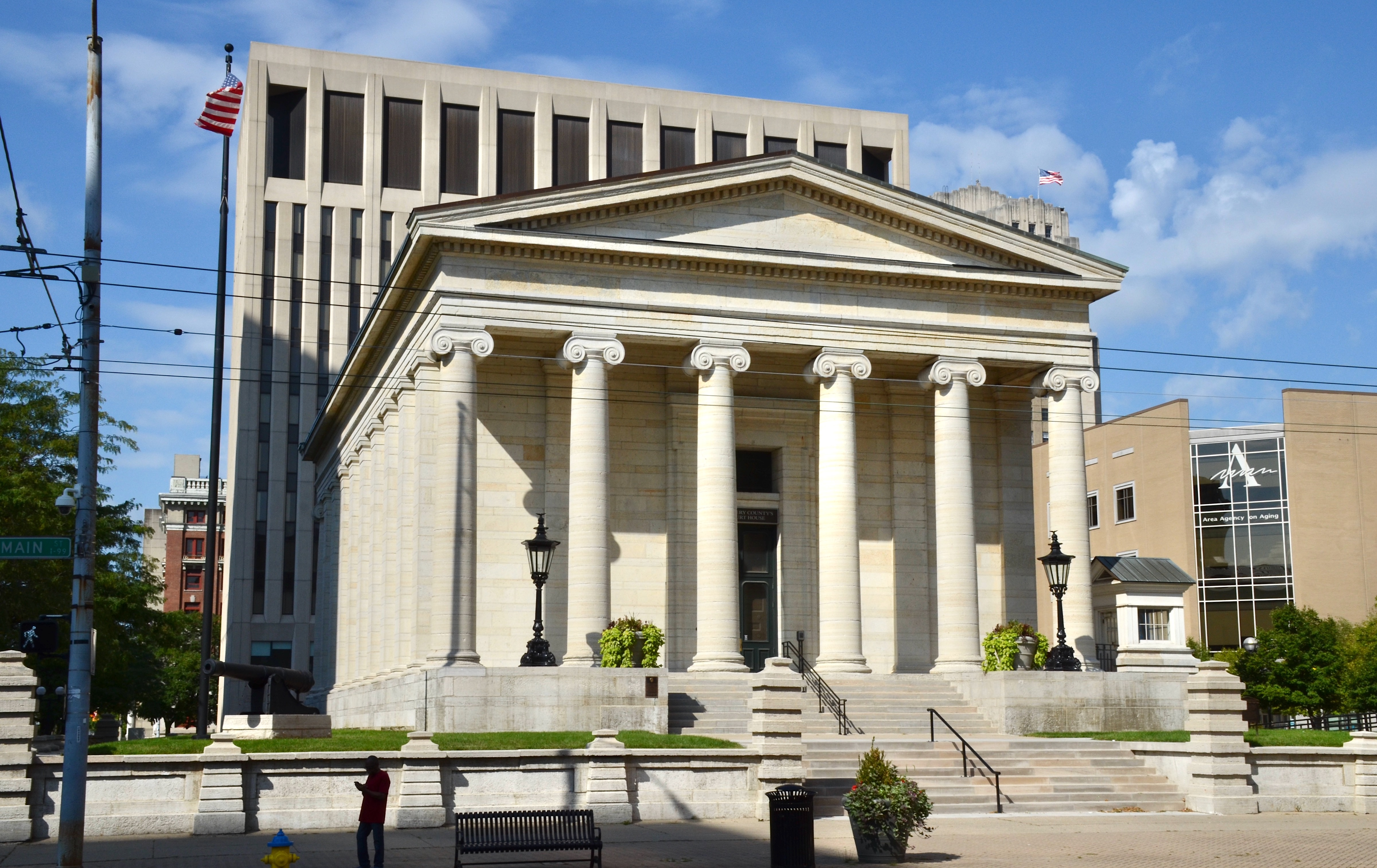
- Montgomery County Courthouse built in 1847

- Location within Ohio Location within the United States
- Location: 21 N. Main St., Dayton, Ohio
- Coordinates: 39.7598°N 84.1923°W
- Built: 1847
- Architect: Howard Daniels
- Architectural style: Greek Revival
- NRHP reference No.: 70000510
- Added to NRHP: January 26, 1970

The Montgomery County Courthouse (MCC), built in 1847, is a historic Greek Revival building located in Dayton, Ohio. It is referred to locally as the Old Courthouse. The limestone building, modeled on the 5th century BC Temple of Hephaestus in Athens, Greece, is the nation's best surviving example of a Greek Revival-style courthouse.

The design was suggested by Dayton citizen Horace Pease, who had a book of sketches of the Acropolis in Athens which showed the Temple of Theseus, which he admired. Pease showed it to the Montgomery County Commissioners, who also were favorably impressed, and agreed it would be a good model for their new Courthouse. They hired architect Howard Daniels of New York to draw the plans in which he captured the form and beauty of the ancient Greek temple.

The building, now restored, stands as a tribute to the leaders of old Dayton and to the artisans of the Miami Valley who built it. The courthouse was added to the National Register of Historic Places on January 26, 1970.

== See also ==
- National Register of Historic Places listings in Dayton, Ohio
