= Dayton Masonic Center =

- U.S. Historic district – Contributing property
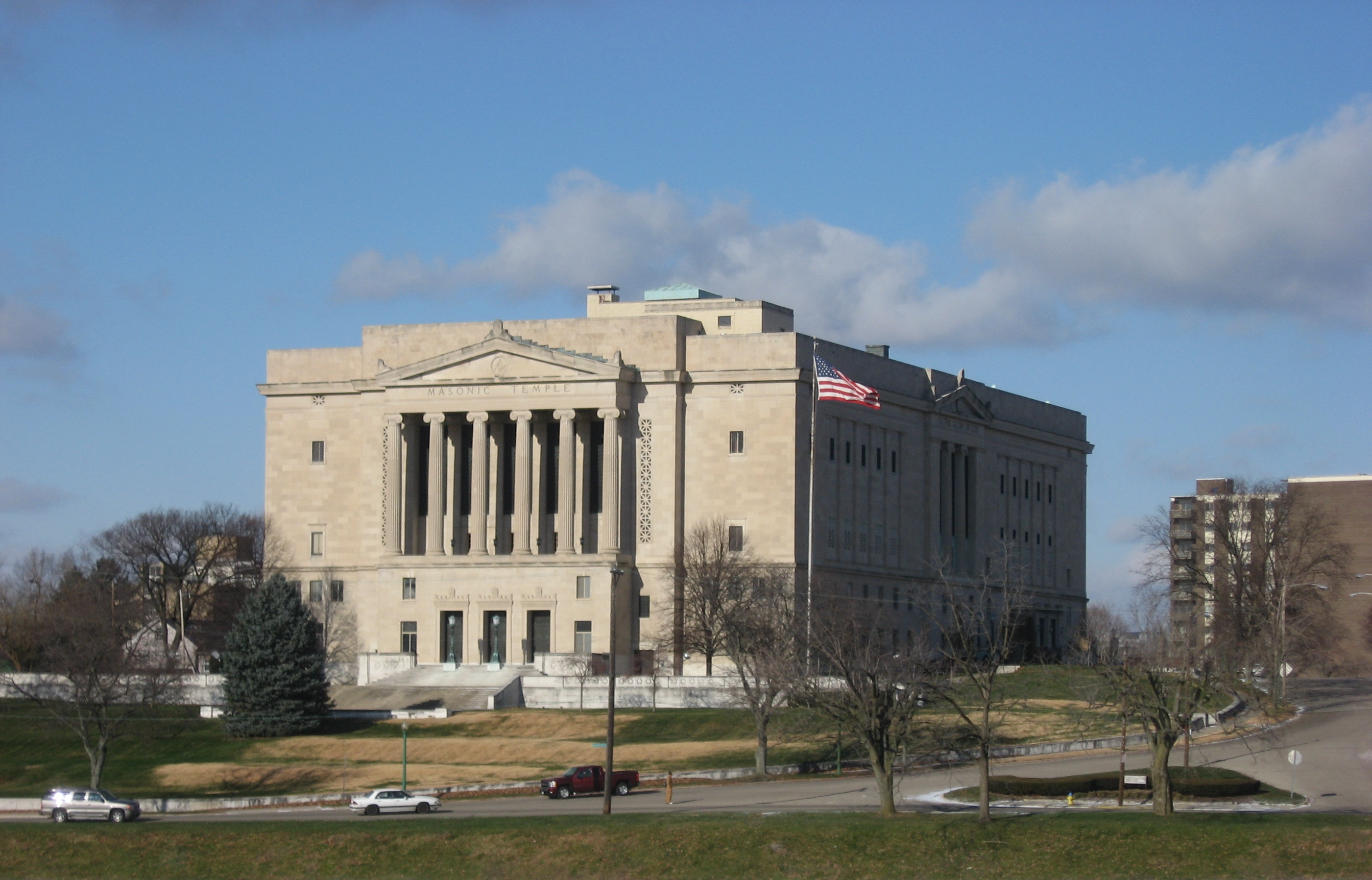

- Location within Ohio Location within the United States
- Location: 573 W. Riverview Avenue, Dayton, Ohio
- Coordinates: 39°45′55.56″N 84°12′10.94″W
- Area: 8.5 acres (34,000 m^{2})
- Built: 1925-1928
- Architectural style: Classical Revival
- Part of: Steele's Hill-Grafton Hill Historic District (ID86001237)
- Added to NRHP: June 5, 1986

The Dayton Masonic Center, formerly the Dayton Masonic Temple, is a significant building in Dayton, Ohio.

It was built by a Masonic Temple Association formed from 14 Masonic groups. The building was finished in 2 years and 9 months, by 450 workers, most of whom were Masonic Brethren, of whom it was said "Without thought of honor or gain, these men gave unstintingly of their time, abilities and means, sparing neither themselves nor their personal interests to advance this building project to its happy fulfillment."

The building is 265 feet (81 m) long by 190 feet (58 m) wide by 80 feet (24 m) high, and encloses 5,000,000 cubic feet (140,000 m^{3}). It is made of steel, cement, and stone, including 55,000 cubic feet (1,600 m^{3}) of Bedford stone and 15,000 cubic feet (420 m^{3}) hard limestone and marble from Vermont, Alabama, and Tennessee.

It is a contributing property in the Steele's Hill-Grafton Hill Historic District, which was added to the National Register of Historic Places in 1986. The building is also included in a locally designated historic district.

== See also ==
- List of Masonic buildings
