= Southern Ohio Lunatic Asylum =

- U.S. National Register of Historic Places
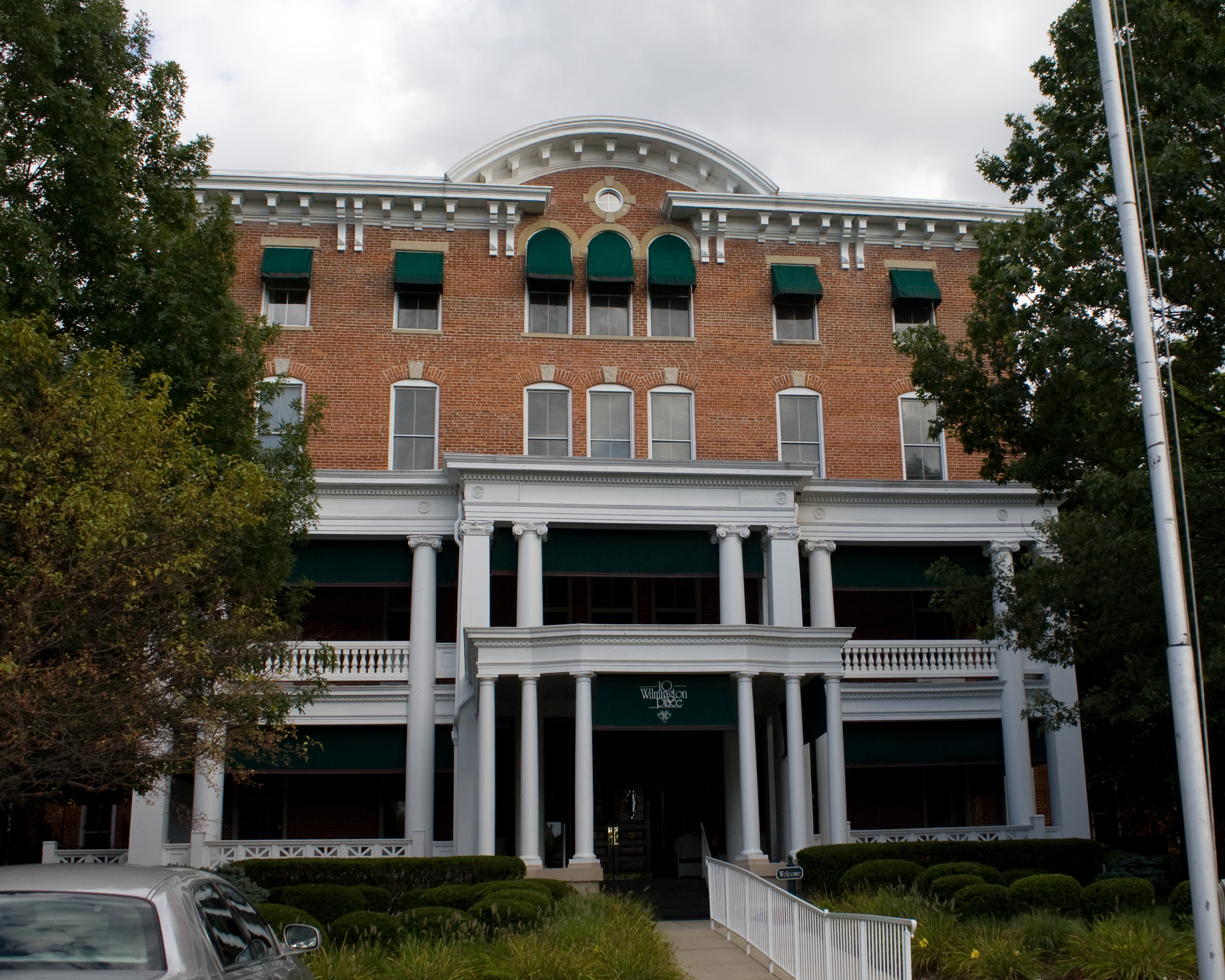

- Location within Ohio Location within the United States
- Location: Dayton, Ohio
- Coordinates: 39°44′16″N 84°9′40″W
- Architect: Dr. Kirkbride
- Architectural style: Italianate
- NRHP reference No.: 79001902
- Added to NRHP: November 15, 1979

The Southern Ohio Lunatic Asylum is an historic structure at 2335 Wayne Ave. in Dayton, Ohio. It was added to the National Register of Historic Places on November 15, 1979.

The 300-acre (120 ha) complex was designed as a mental asylum in accordance with principles advocated by Philadelphia psychiatrist Thomas Story Kirkbride in the mid-19th century. It was renamed the Dayton State Hospital and later the Dayton Mental Health Center.

The distinctive main building at the intersection of Wayne and Wilmington avenues is now a retirement center, the hospital farm is now Kettering's Miami Valley Research Park, and other hospital land is now the site of private homes and Hospice of Dayton.

== Historic uses ==
- Health care

== See also ==
- National Register of Historic Places listings in Dayton, Ohio
