= Kelly Family Home =

Historic house in Ohio, United States

- U.S. National Register of Historic Places
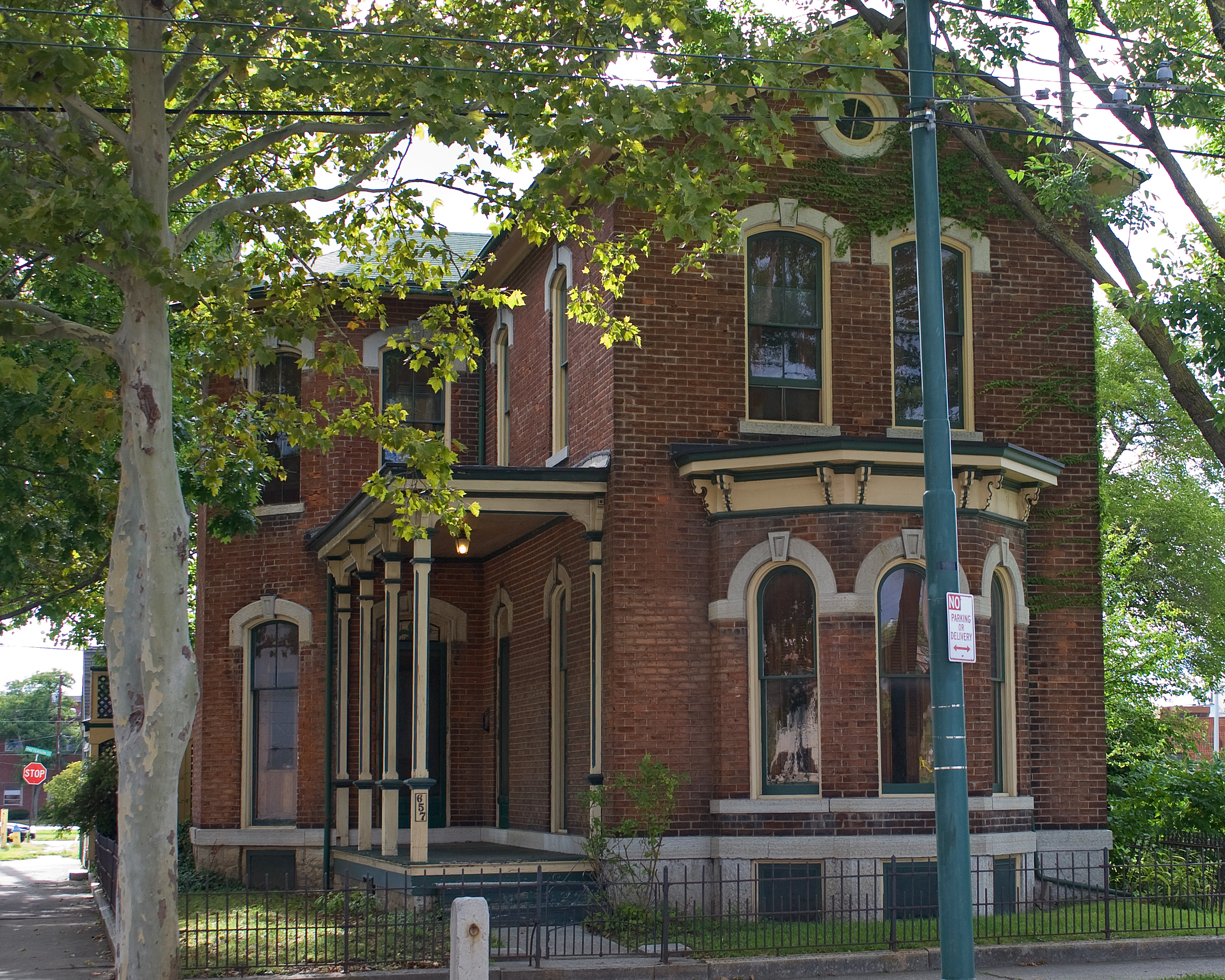

- Location within Ohio Location within the United States
- Location: Dayton, Ohio
- Coordinates: 39°44′58″N 84°11′21″W
- Built: 1876
- Architect: Andrew Kinninger
- Architectural style: Italianate
- NRHP reference No.: 75001501
- Added to NRHP: June 30, 1975

The Kelly Family Home is a historic structure at 657 S. Main St. in Dayton, Ohio. It was added to the National Register of Historic Places on June 30, 1975.

== Historic uses ==
The house at 657 South Main Street was originally the home of John S. Kelly. The home was built by Kelley's father in law, Andrew Kinninger who was a local contractor.

Kelly was born in Maryland in 1840 and moved to Dayton in 1856. Kelly had been a managing partner of a local bakery and opened his own grocery store. John Kelly died in 1910 and his widow continued living in the house until she died in 1924.

== See also ==
- National Register of Historic Places listings in Dayton, Ohio
