= Dayton Motor Car Company Historic District =

- U.S. National Register of Historic Places
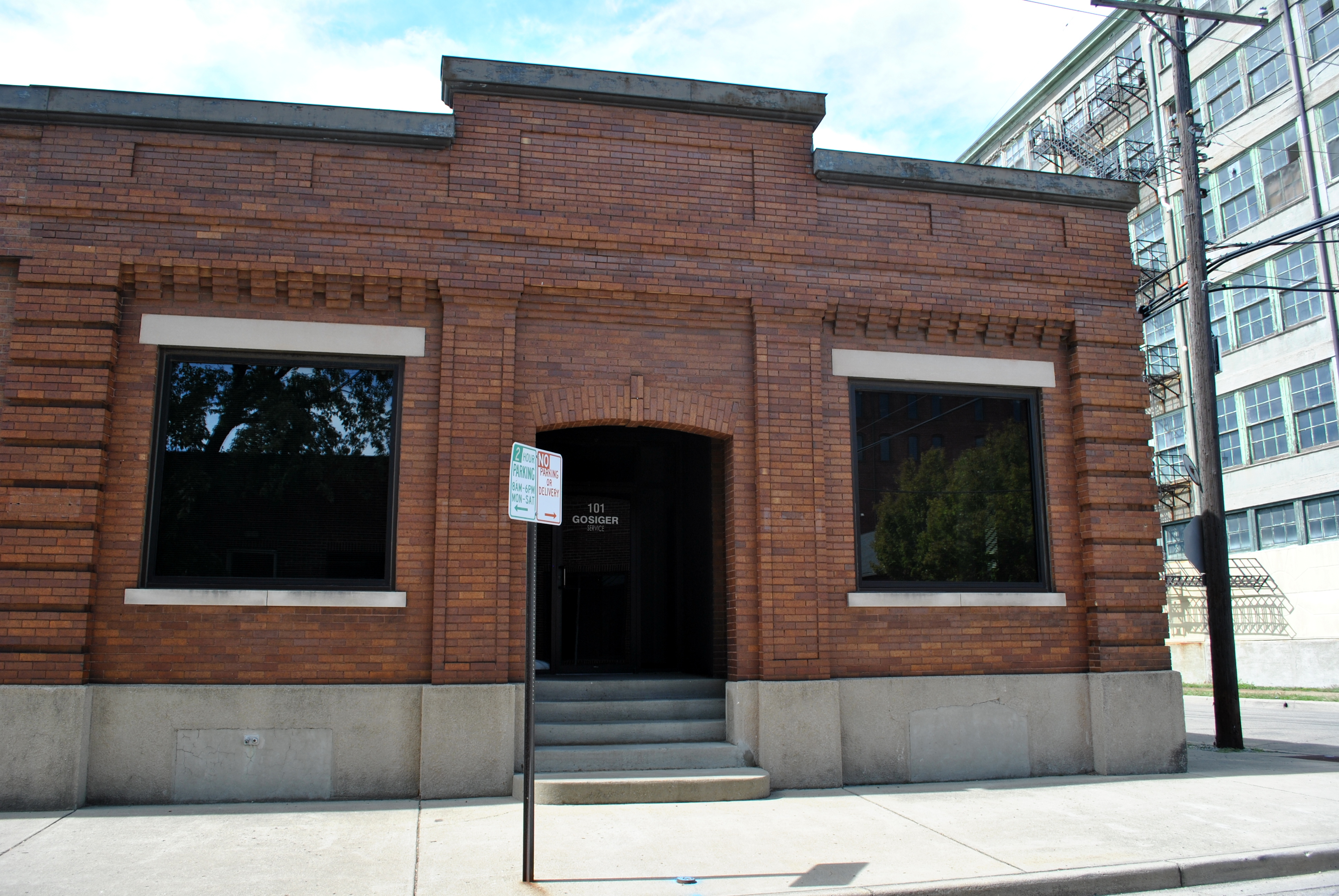

- Location within Ohio
- Location: 15, 101,123-5 Bainbridge; 9-111 and 122-124 McDonough, Dayton, Ohio
- Coordinates: 39°45′34″N 84°10′50″W
- Area: 12 acres (4.9 ha)
- Built: 1873
- NRHP reference No.: 84003785
- Added to NRHP: May 31, 1984

The Dayton Motor Car Company Historic District, in Dayton, Ohio, is a 12-acre (4.9 ha) historic district which was listed on the National Register of Historic Places in 1984. The listing included 12 contributing buildings.

It includes properties at 15, 101,123-5 Bainbridge; 9-111 and 122-124 McDonough, in Dayton, including at least one dating back to 1873.
