= Nicholas Ohmer House =

- U.S. National Register of Historic Places
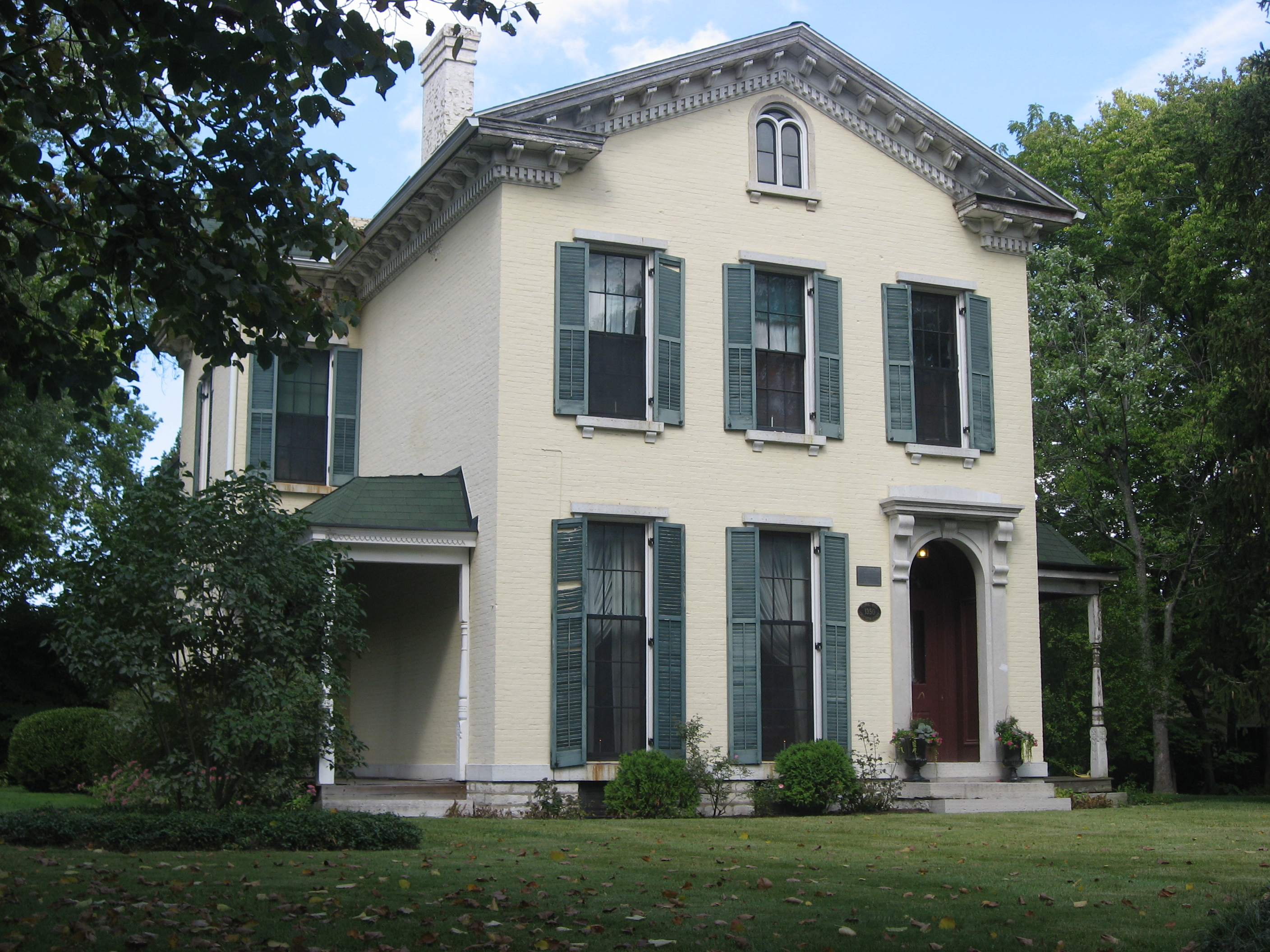

- Location within Ohio Location within the United States
- Location: 1350 Creighton St. Dayton, Ohio
- Coordinates: 39°44′26″N 84°09′14″W
- Area: 3,996 square feet (371.2 m^{2})
- Built: 1864
- NRHP reference No.: 74001580
- Added to NRHP: October 16, 1974

The Nicholas Ohmer House is a house in Walnut Hills, Dayton, Ohio that is listed on the National Register of Historic Places.

The home, also known as Floral Hill, has 5 bedrooms, 3 full baths, 1 half bath, and 7 decorative marble fireplaces.

Nicholas Ohmer (1823–1909) was born in the province of Lorraine, France and immigrated with his family to Dayton, Ohio in 1837. Nicholas had been trained as a confectioner and the family soon opened a restaurant and confectionary on Second Street near Main.

Excerpt from Allen's Strawberry Catalogue (1900) describing the Nick Ohmer strawberry.

Successful in business, Ohmer also had a passion for growing fruits and flowers. He purchased a 108 acres (44 ha) fruit farm and erected his home there in 1864. An ardent horticulturist, he marketed wholesale fruit and nursery stock, developing the Nick Ohmer Strawberry strain which is still used as a basic stock for developing modern varieties.
