= Lichliter Mound and Village Site =

- U.S. National Register of Historic Places
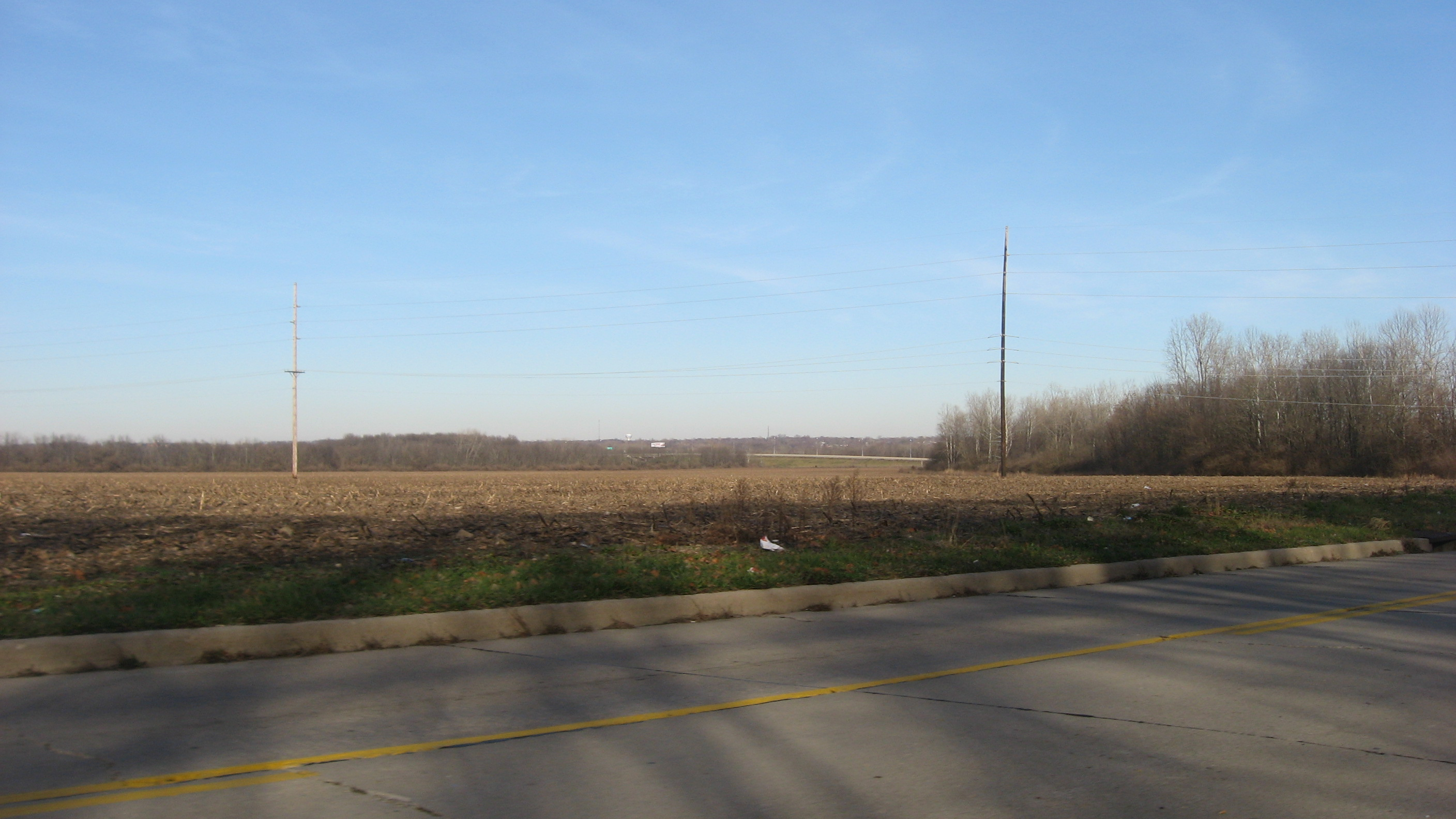

- Location within Ohio Location within the United States
- Location: Dayton, Ohio
- Coordinates: 39°46′46″N 84°17′08″W
- Area: 8 acres (3.2 ha)
- Built: 680
- NRHP reference No.: 73001510
- Added to NRHP: June 4, 1973

The Lichliter Mount and Village Site is a historic archeologic site in western Dayton, Montgomery County, Ohio, in fields on the northern side of an intermittent stream, 1 mile (1.6 km) above Wolf Creek and 6 miles (9.7 km) above the Great Miami River

The village was established around A.D. 680 during the Woodland period and is associated with the Cole culture.

The site was discovered in 1953. From 1962 to 1970 the Dayton Society of Natural History (DSNH) conducted major academic and institutional excavations, uncovering house structures, pits, and thousands of artifacts. The site was added to the National Register of Historic Places on June 4, 1973.

In April 2025, the City of Dayton completed a two-year archaeological investigation on the 126-acre (51 ha) property to evaluate future development suitability. The assessment recovered more than 2,000 smaller cultural items — including pottery, flint stones, charcoal, animal bone, and debitage — and delivered to the Boonshoft Museum of Discovery. No human or ancestral Native American remains were found during this study. The site also revealed a 19th-century dairy farm history.

An undisturbed eight-acre portion of the ancient village area is preserved, while the surrounding acreage has been cleared by the State Historic Preservation Office for potential light industrial or R&D development.
