= Steele's Hill–Grafton Hill Historic District =

Historic district in Ohio, United States

- U.S. National Register of Historic Places
- U.S. Historic district
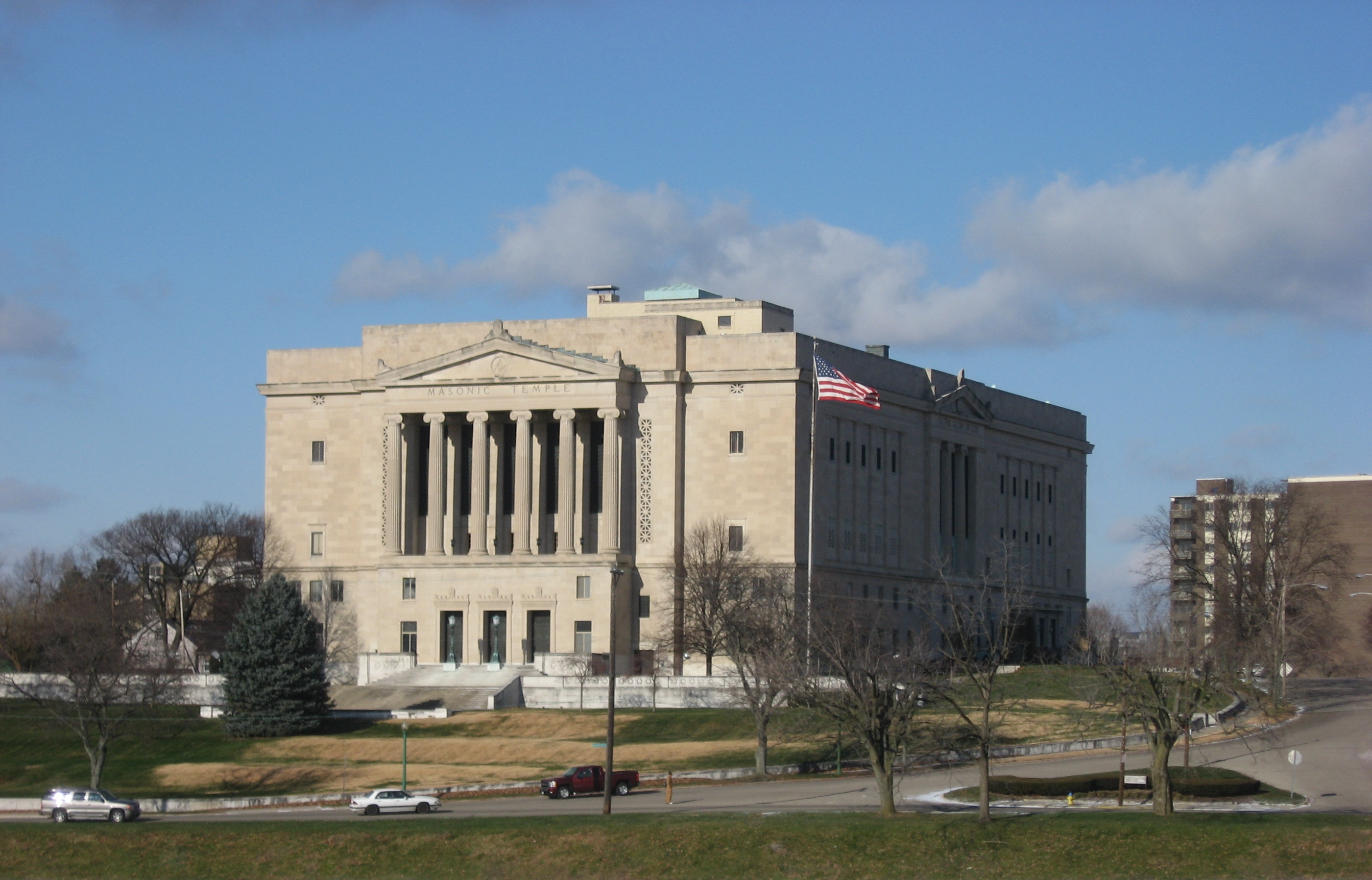
- The Dayton Masonic Center, a part of the district

- Location within Ohio Location within the United States
- Location: Roughly bounded by Grand, Plymouth, Forest, and Salem, Dayton, Ohio
- Coordinates: 39°45′59″N 84°12′15″W
- Area: 70 acres (28 ha)
- Built: 1880
- Architectural style: Classical Revival, Bungalow/Craftsman, Queen Anne
- NRHP reference No.: 86001237 (original); 100009613 (increase)

Significant dates
- Added to NRHP: June 5, 1986
- Boundary increase: December 18, 2023

The Steele's Hill–Grafton Hill Historic District, or simply known locally as Grafton Hill, is a small 18-block sector of Dayton, Ohio, United States that was developed in the late 19th century.

== Historic district ==
In 1986, Steele's Hill–Grafton Hill was added to the National Register of Historic Places. It is also a locally designated historic district.

== History ==
Although sometimes considered part of Dayton View, Grafton Hill has its own separate and important existence and history. It was developed at a time when Dayton's population was moving from the center of the city outward, north of the Miami River. Grafton Hill was enlarged and enriched in 1875 when John Stoddard, a wealthy and prominent farm implement manufacturer, developed the exclusive Belmonte Park residential area. The construction of the Dayton Art Institute and the Dayton Masonic Temple added to the affluent aura of the community. Today, Grafton Hill is known for the depth of its economic and cultural diversity. The fashionable nature of Grafton Hill remains intact and continues to be celebrated.

== Architecture ==
The architecture of Steele Hill–Grafton Hill Historic District include Jacobeathan style but also contains Queen Anne, Victorian, Craftsman, Classical Revival and Tudor style homes.

== See also ==
- National Register of Historic Places listings in Dayton, Ohio
