= Dayton View Triangle Historic District =

- U.S. National Register of Historic Places
- U.S. Historic district
- Location within Ohio
- Interactive map of Dayton View Triangle Historic District
- Location: Bounded by Salem Ave, Cornell Dr, and Philadelphia Dr, Dayton, Ohio
- Nearest city: Dayton, Ohio
- Coordinates: 39°46′48″N 84°13′40″W
- Area: 240 acres (97 ha)
- Built: 1904–1976
- Architectural style: Tudor Revival, Colonial Revival, Craftsman, Prairie School, Spanish Colonial Revival, Italian Renaissance, Modernist, Cape Cod
- Website: https://www.daytonviewtriangle.com/
- NRHP reference No.: 100007950
- Added to NRHP: August 1, 2022

The Dayton View Triangle Historic District (also historically known as the Upper Dayton View) is a historically significant residential neighborhood located in Dayton, Ohio. Recognized for its unique social history and variety of architectural styles from the early to mid-20th century, the district was officially added to the National Register of Historic Places on August 1, 2022.

== History ==
The Dayton View Triangle (DVT) is known for its social and architectural history during the period of 1904–1976. This period includes its entire development, from initial platting and construction phases to the formation of its neighborhood association and creation of its boundaries.

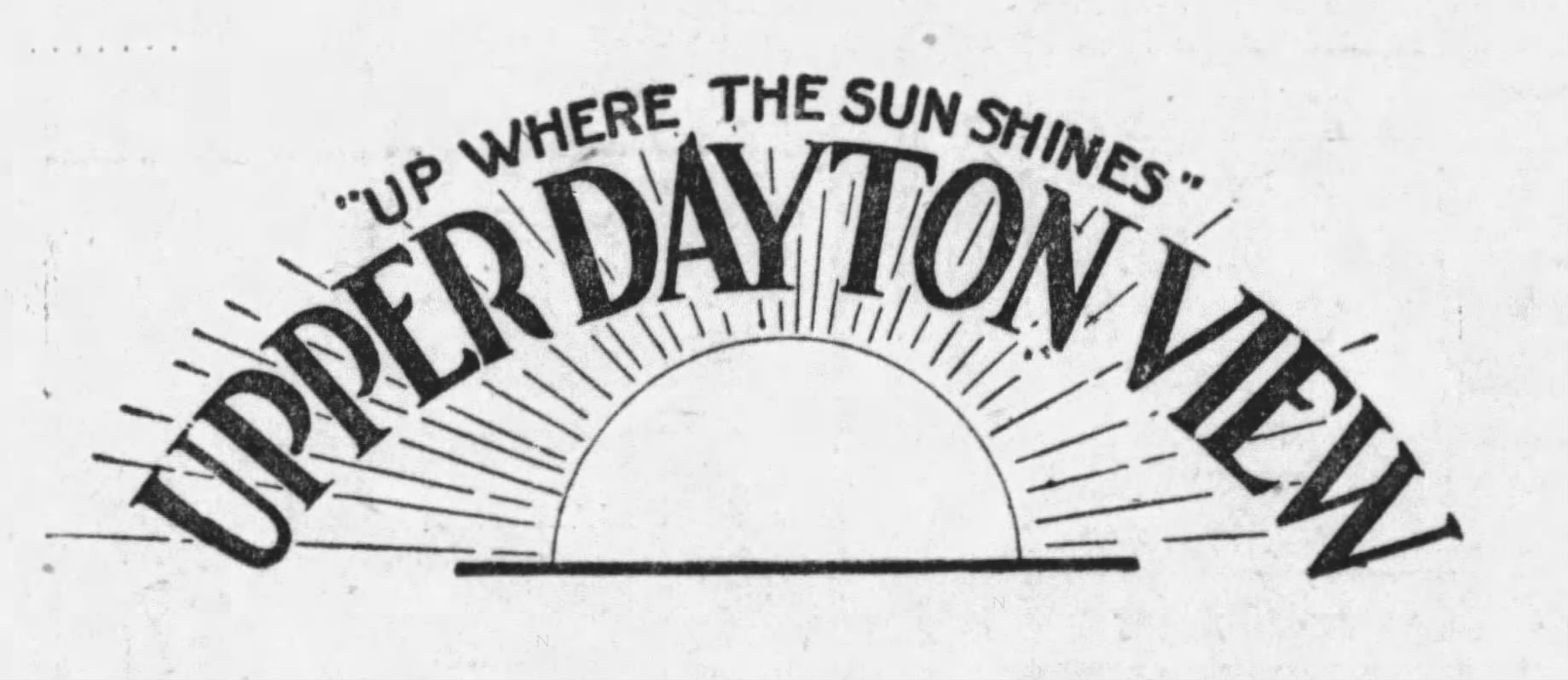
Upper Dayton View "Where the Sun Shines" illustrated advertisement logo from 1923

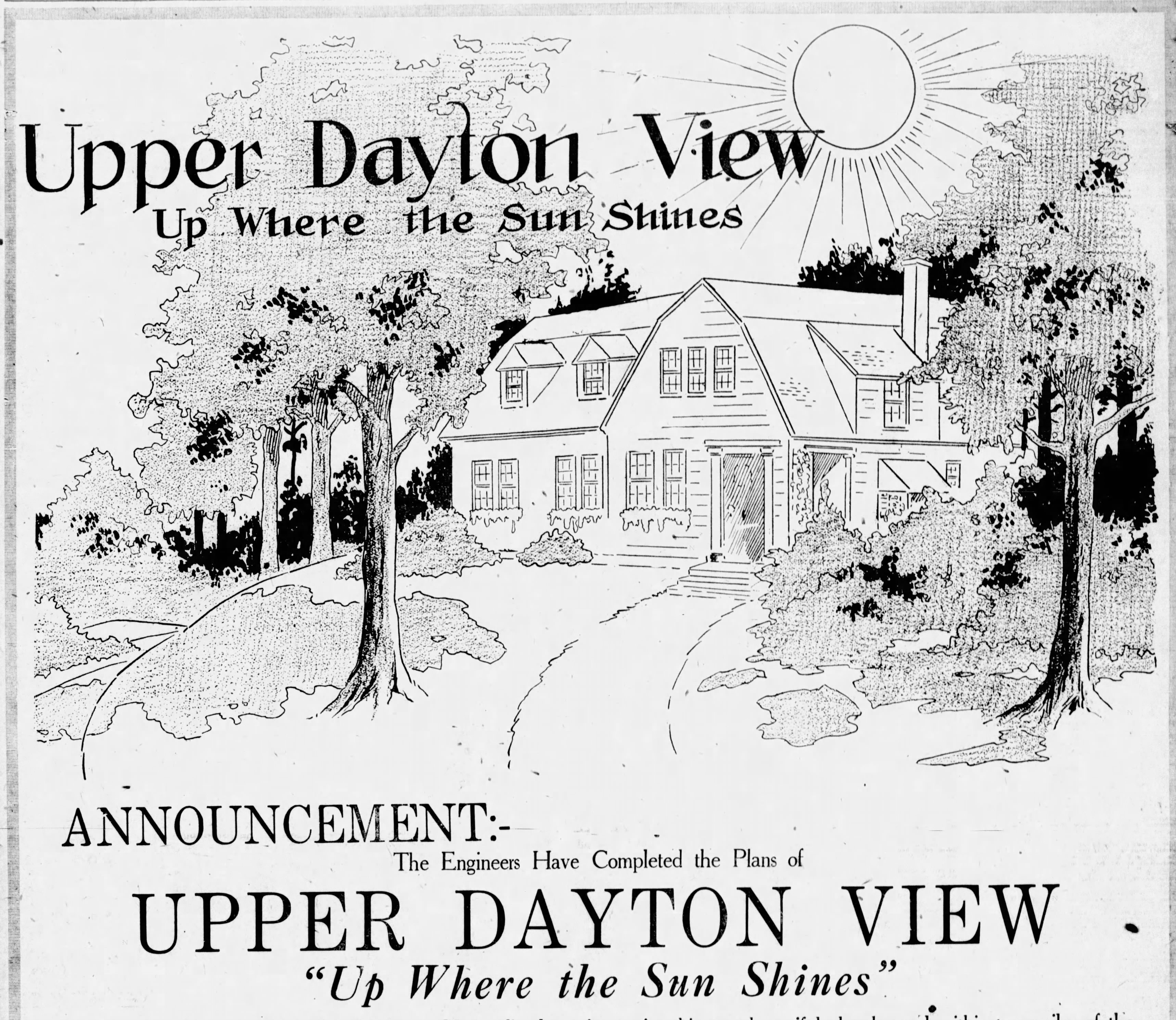
Illustrated advertisement for the Upper Dayton View from 1919

==== 1904–1919 ====
Before its suburban development, the DVT area was mostly agricultural or land that was farmed or wooded within Harrison Township, near Dayton's municipal boundary. The Great Miami River, about one mile south, and the higher elevation of the DVT made it a desirable location for development, particularly after the Great Flood of 1913. The flood affected much of downtown Dayton and surrounding areas, making higher ground attractive for residential development. Many Daytonians who had suffered through the flood wanted high ground and attractive housing in the area.

Notable groups influenced this early phase of devlopment:

- Dayton View Improvement Company: Formed in 1904 by prominent Dayton developers, this company created the Mt. Auburn plat which was drawn in September 1904. This subdivision followed a grid-iron pattern typical of streetcar suburbs in Midwestern industrial cities of the era. Only 27 of the district's surviving buildings were bult before 1919.
- Bonebrake Theological Seminary: In 1911, the seminary acquired about 269 acres of land south and west of the Mt. Auburn plat, parts of which would become DVT, with plans for a large campus. After the 1913 flood, the seminary opted for a smaller campus and planned to sell its remaining unplatted land for residential development under the condition that new construction be "in harmony with the general plan of the [seminary] buildings."
- Schwind Realty Company: In 1907, this company likely acquired 30 acres of land south of the Mt. Auburn subdivision. The company then obtained 250 acres of undeveloped land from the seminary in 1919 and formed the Upper Dayton View Improvement Company to plat the residential subdivisions.

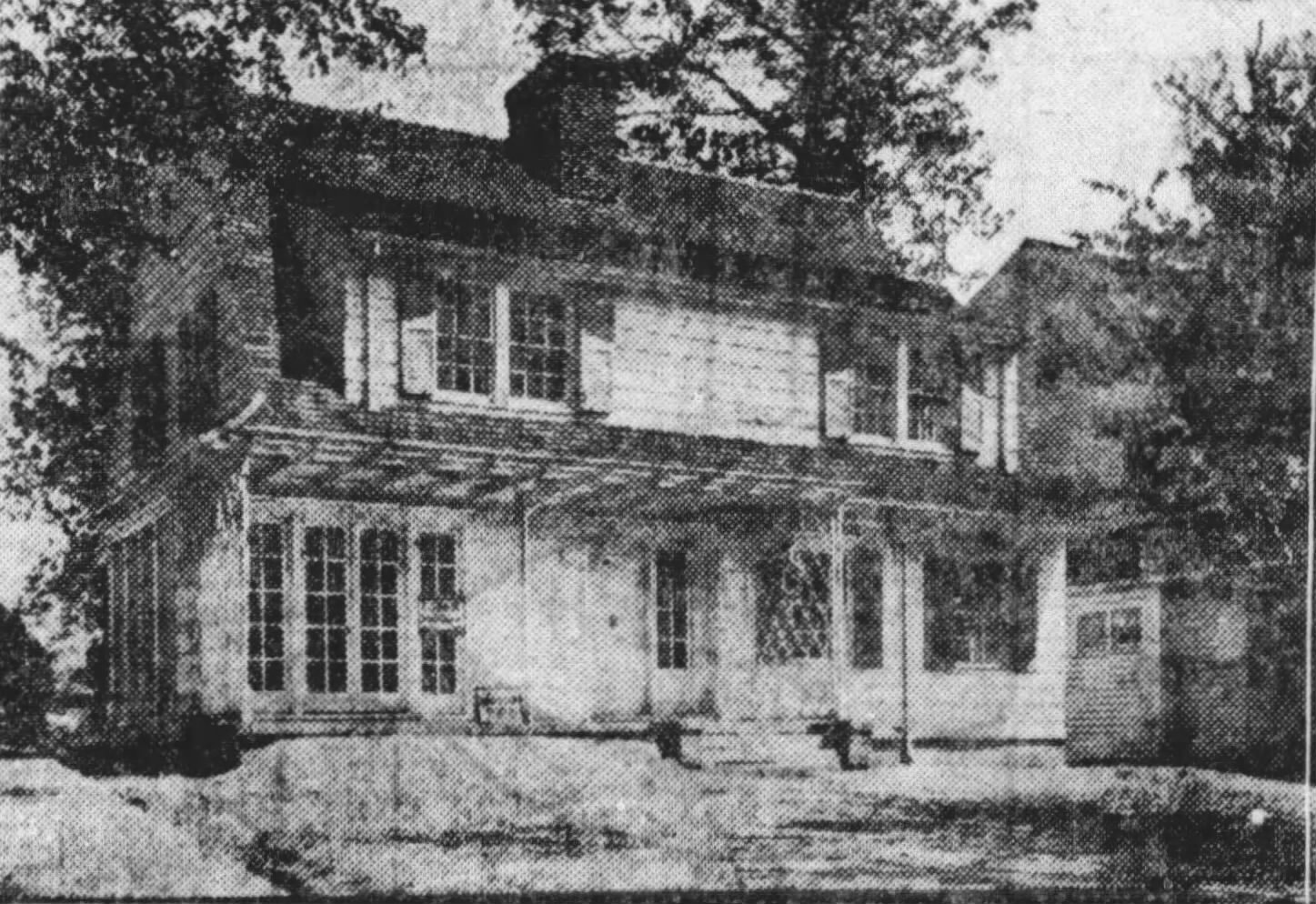
Photo of 213 Otterbein Ave in 1923, a part of the DVT

==== 1920–1929 ====
The 1920s marked a period of rapid development in DVT, with nearly half of the properties constructed during this decade. The Upper Dayton View subdivisions (Sections 1–4, platted between 1920 and 1926) were designed by Charlton Putnam, an engineer and landscape architect. These subdivisions featured "warped grid" patterns with curvilinear streets, wider sidewalks, and tree-lined buffers, contrasting with the earlier grid-iron layout.

==== 1930–1945 ====
The neighborhood was annexed to the City of Dayton in 1930. The city's 1928 building code, which did not reference racial covenants, did not supersede existing restrictions, grandfathering in segregation clauses. These segregation clauses were prepared in 1927 and in deeds in Upper Dayton View, they stated that properties "shall not be sold, transferred, leased, rented or permitted to be occupied by any person or persons other than members of the white race." Older plats in the DVT area also had restrictions towards "undesirable persons". Despite these restrictions, Dayton's Jewish community found acceptance in Upper Dayton View, due to the thriving Jewish community in the older Dayton View area to the south and the impact of the 1913 flood.

Construction slowed significantly during the Great Depression, particularly after 1932. The housing market suffered from bank failures and foreclosures. Federal legislation like the Federal Home Loan Act, Home Owners Loan Act, and National Housing Act were introduced to stabilize the market. However, these policies, especially the Home Owners' Loan Corporation (HOLC) and Federal Housing Administration (FHA), actively promoted racial segregation through practices like redlining. The DVT was classified as a Grade A (most desirable) area in Dayton's 1937 HOLC Residential Security Map, which made it easier for residents to obtain loans and incentivized the neighborhood to remain homogenous. By the end of World War II, DVT was about 80% developed.

==== 1946–1976 ====
Post-WWII, an influx of veterans and the Second Great Black Migration fueled rapid population growth in Dayton, leading to a high demand for housing. The FHA and the 1944 GI Bill of Rights insured loans, further boosting construction. Vacant lots in DVT, especially in Upper Dayton View Section 4, were quickly developed, leading to the near completion of the district's development by the early 1960s.

In 1976, DVT residents formed the Dayton View Triangle Federation of Homeowners to create a sense of community, address challenges like vacant dwellings, and promote diversity. This organization formally recognized the neighborhood's identity and ratified the neighborhood's boundary. In 1992, the Federation revised its articles of incorporation to explicitly promote the elimination of prejudice and discrimination.

== Boundaries ==
The Dayton View Triangle neighborhood was added to the National Register of Historic Places (No. SG100007950) on August 1, 2022. The designated area is bounded by Salem Avenue to the northeast, Cornell Drive to the south, and Philadelphia Drive to the west, encompassing an area of approximately 240 acres. Its southern border lies about one mile north of the Great Miami River, at an elevation of roughly 850–950 feet above sea level, placing it over 100 feet higher than the riverbanks.

The district's boundaries were selected to reflect a shared significance among its resources, its defined geography, and the historically established identity of the neighborhood, which was formally recognized by the city of Dayton and community in the mid-1970s. The district contains a total of 1,194 contributing resources and 46 non-contributing resources, including two sites. The contributing resources primarily consist of buildings (1,193) and one site, while non-contributing resources include 45 buildings and one site.

== Architecture ==
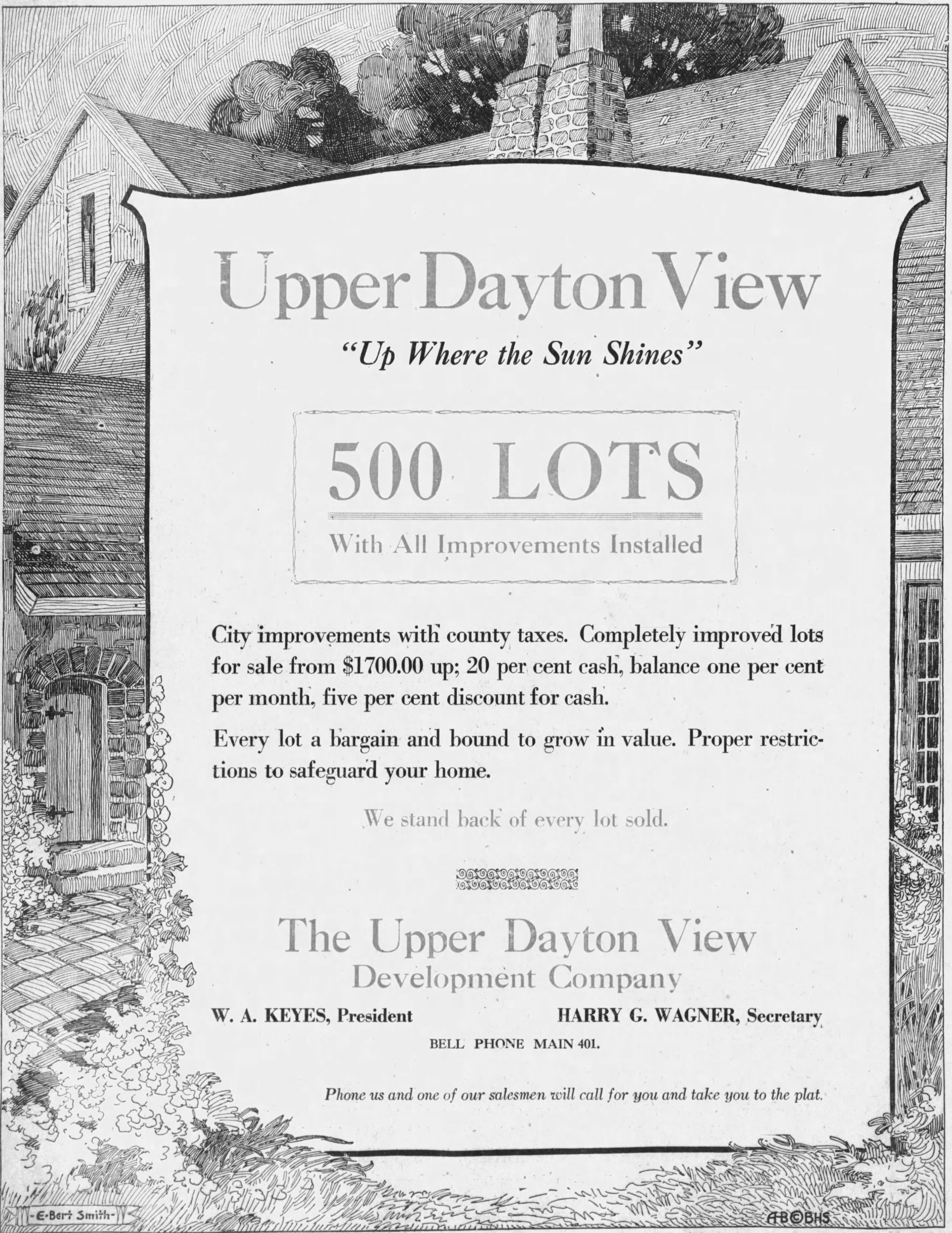
Upper Dayton View advertisement illustration from 1923

The Dayton View Triangle Historic District has a variety of architectural styles, reflecting its extended period of development from the early 20th century through the mid-20th century. The district comprises 764 main buildings, primarily residential, including 682 single dwellings, 43 duplexes, and 30 apartment buildings, along with institutional, religious, and commercial structures.

==== Predominant architectural styles ====
- Tudor Revival: The most prevalent style in DVT, with over 240 examples. With homes sometimes exhibiting prominent chimney stacks.
- Colonial Revival: The second most common style, with over 230 English Colonial examples. Typically two-storied, symmetrical, side-gabled facades with central doorways.
- Craftsman/Prairie: Common in the earliest plats and along Salem Avenue, these homes are typically one to two stories. Examples include American Foursquare and Bungalow types, sometimes incorporating Prairie style elements.
- Spanish Revival: Less common (12 homes), characterized by asymmetrical plans, stucco exterior walls, low-pitched red-tiled roofs, arched entrances and windows, and decorative tile work.
- Neoclassical Revival: 16 dwellings are constructed in the style, with most being apartment buildings.
- Italian Renaissance Revival: 12 dwellings are in this style.
- French Eclectic: The three homes featuring this style in the DVT are all asymmetrical with towers and steeply pitched roofs.
- Cape Cod/Minimal Traditional: One or one and a half storied homes, typically with cross-gable or gable roofs. These were influenced by FHA guidelines for affordability and were constructed through the mid 1950s.
- Ranch: Ranch homes in the DVT invariably feature attached garages.

Many homes were constructed by local builders and developers, often inspired by mail-order home catalogues like those from Sears Roebuck & Company, and Lewis Homes. Three homes in the district are Sears kit homes. The homes incorporated technological advances such as central heating, indoor plumbing, and electricity.

The home on 104 Otterbein Ave, built in 1922 is particularly notable for being the first electric home in Dayton, attracting over 50,000 people to view the home.

== Parks ==
The DVT neighborhood features a notable park area, known as the Omega Lofts (formerly Bonebrake Theological Seminary Campus). This area is roughly nineteen-acres, and originally served as the Bonebrake Seminary campus which had land set aside in 1919 before opening in 1923. This area essentially functions as the park and playground for the DVT.

The landscaping for the original seminary campus was laid out by the Olmsted Brothers firm in 1919, known for designing New York City's Central Park. While some original buildings have been removed, the original seminary building (Fout Hall/Omega Lofts) and an associated church remain. The site has been redeveloped to include new Omega Loft apartment buildings and the Hope Center for Family Life.
