= McPherson Town Historic District =

Historic district in Ohio, United States

- U.S. National Register of Historic Places
- U.S. Historic district
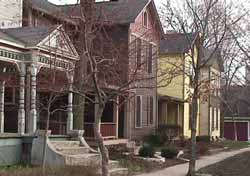
- Houses along McDaniel Street.

- Location within Ohio Location within the United States
- Location: Roughly bounded by Main St., Great Miami River, and I-75, Dayton, Ohio
- Coordinates: 39°46′3″N 84°11′46″W
- Built: February 1, 1845
- Architectural style: Stick/Eastlake, Queen Anne and others.
- NRHP reference No.: 88001712
- Added to NRHP: September 29, 1988

The McPherson Town Historic District of Dayton, Ohio, contains roughly 90 structures north of downtown Dayton, across the Great Miami River.

== History ==
Tucked into a corner of the horseshoe area formed by a bend in the Great Miami River, McPherson Town was founded on February 1, 1845. On this date, an Irishman named Samuel McPherson filed a plat consisting of 34 swampy, wooded lots on both sides of Dayton and Covington Turnpike. The center of this plat was located at the present-day North Main Street. and McPherson Street.

McPherson Town and much of Dayton were devastated by the flood of 1897 and the Great Dayton Flood of 1913. Many homes were destroyed or badly damaged. Current residents still find pounds of flood mud in walls and ceilings during renovation projects.

In the years following World War II, many Dayton residents moved to the suburbs. After years of neglect, the McPherson Town area was slated for bulldozing and urban renewal. Residential property was purchased for speculative purposes, including commercial development, highrise condominiums and an interstate highway. But in the early 1970s, a few key private investors recognized the unique historical significance of the neighborhood and began to renovate several old homes. With this, a move to obtain historic district status began.

In August, 1977 Dayton declared McPherson Town its third historic neighborhood and structures were protected from future urban renewal efforts. In 1988, McPherson Town was registered on the National Register of Historic Places, bounded by Main Street, the Great Miami River, I-75 and Downtown Dayton (No. 88001712). City of Dayton Ordinance #25363.

== Architecture ==
Most of the structures still in existence today in McPherson Town were built between 1880 and 1900. The architecture of McPherson Town Historic District includes examples Stick/Eastlake, Queen Anne and others. Since 1995, several modern infill houses have been constructed to replace structures that had been lost to fire or decay, and repair the streetscape of the neighborhood. These new construction homes are designed to look period with modern conveniences.

== See also ==
- National Register of Historic Places listings in Dayton, Ohio
