= Dayton View Historic District =

Historic district in Ohio, United States

- U.S. National Register of Historic Places
- U.S. Historic district
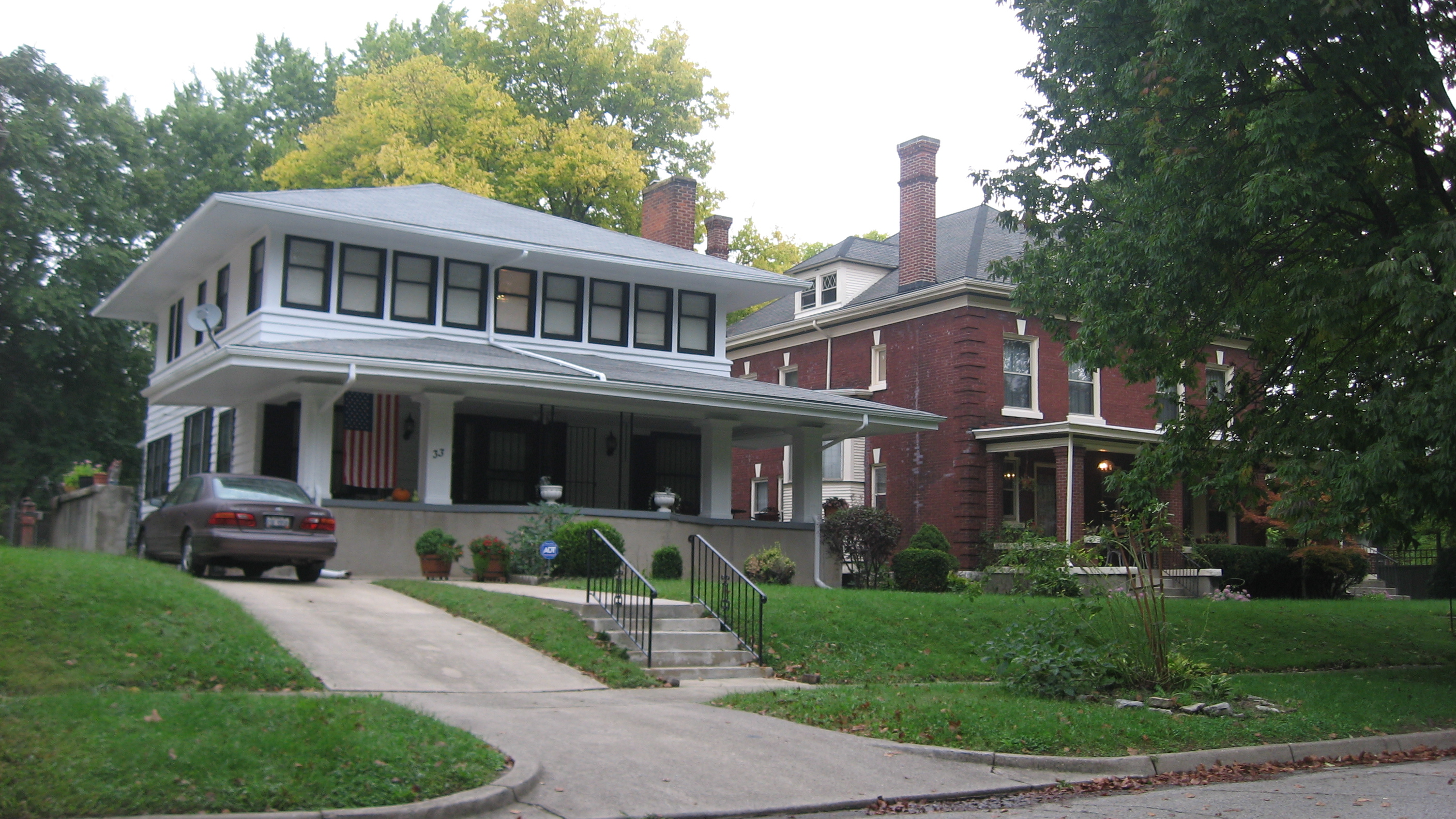
- Houses in the northern part of the district

- Location within Ohio Location within the United States
- Location: Roughly bounded by Broadway, Harvard Blvd., Superior and Salem Aves., Dayton, Ohio
- Coordinates: 39°46′4″N 84°12′59″W
- Built: 1880
- Architect: Multiple
- Architectural style: Colonial Revival, Late Victorian
- NRHP reference No.: 84003787
- Added to NRHP: July 19, 1984

The Dayton View Historic District is a 680-acre (2.8 km^{2}) sector of Dayton, Ohio, United States, developed in the late 19th century and consisting of 219 structures, that is listed on the National Register of Historic Places.

== Historic district ==
In 1984, Dayton View was registered on the National Register of Historic Places, Broadway, Harvard Blvd., Superior and Salem Aves. (No. 84003787). City of Dayton Ordinance #25552.

== History ==
The area's style and layout should be credited to the vision of James Oliver Arnold, whose farm house still stands at the northwest corner of Superior and Arnold. The original portion of the farmhouse dates to 1832. James Arnold envisioned a grand neighborhood of broad, tree-lined streets graced with large, impressive homes set back comfortably from the street. Reforestation efforts following the loss of Arnold's distinctive elm trees are reviving Arnold's dream. Dayton View was historically one of Dayton's most prominent neighborhoods.

== Architecture ==
Dayton View includes houses of many architectural styles, such as Victorian, Jacobethan, Chateauesque, American Foursquare, and Prairie School architecture. The timeline of the architecture style is dated from the late 1880s through the 1930s. Dayton View, however, is listed on the National Register for Late Victorian and Colonial Revival styles.

== See also ==
- National Register of Historic Places listings in Dayton, Ohio
