= Jenet-Roetter House =

House in Dayton, Ohio

Coordinates: 39°46′19″N 84°12′10″W

The Jenet-Roetter House was designed by Dayton architectural firm Schenck and Williams.

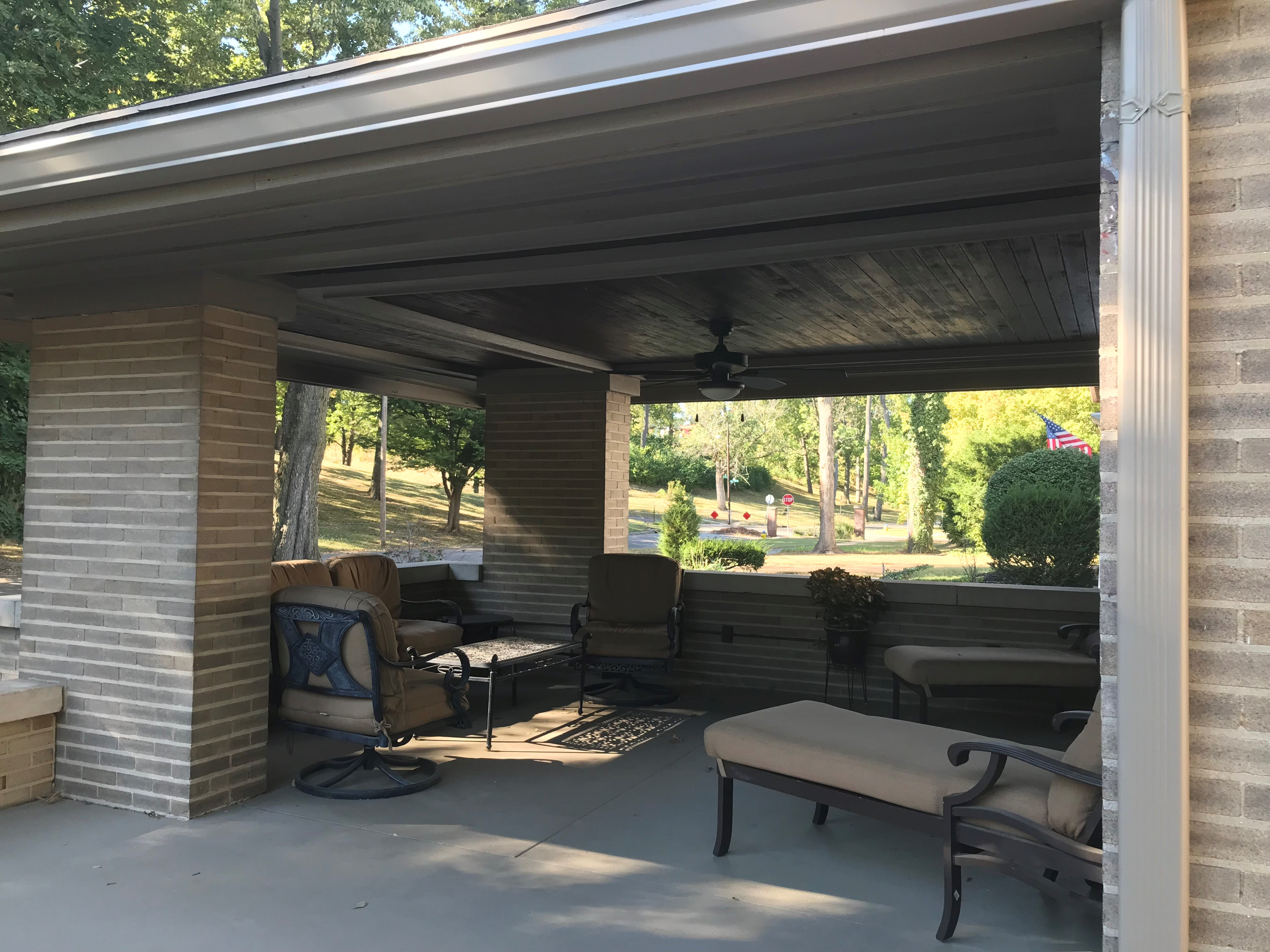
The front porch evokes the Prairie School style that features a connection to the outdoors.

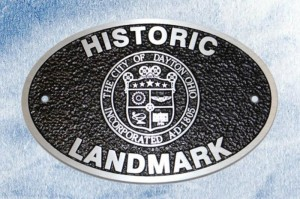
The Jenet-Roetter House was designated as a Dayton Historic Landmark in 2019 after receiving unanimous votes by the city's Landmarks Commission, Plan Board, and Mayor/Commission.

The Jenet-Roetter House at 148 Squirrel Road in the Five Oaks District of Dayton, Ohio is a private home known as a notable example of Prairie School architecture made popular by famous American architect Frank Lloyd Wright. It was designed by the Dayton architectural firm Schenck and Williams, which also designed the Wright Brothers home Hawthorn Hill, which is a National Historic Landmark open to the public.

The house, built in 1913, is included as a full page in the City of Dayton’s Blueprint for Preservation handbook, and in 2019 with the help of Dayton Historic Preservation Officer Rachel Bankowitz and Chief Planner/Plan Board Secretary Ann Schenking was designated as a Dayton Historic Landmark following unanimous approval by the Dayton Landmarks Commission, Dayton Plan Board, and the Dayton City Commission.

According to research by writer and academic librarian Andrew Walsh, author of "Lost Dayton" and the Dayton Vistas blog, Carrie E. Jenet was born circa 1861 in Illinois to German parents. She is recorded as acquiring the 8,735 square foot lot in 1911. Carrie Jenet and her sister Elizabeth Jenet were sisters-in-law to the head of household William J. Roetter.

Roetter spent 47 years as a buyer for the linen and white goods department of the Rike-Kumler Co. and was also a Mason and member of the First Lutheran Church. It is likely that Roetter made a significant financial contribution to purchase the lot for $1,200, hire the architectural firm of Schenck and Williams, and construct the house for $7,500. A garage was later added at a cost of about $300.

A 1917 "Dayton Herald" article identified Carrie Jenet as a “modiste,” or dressmaker, who dealt in high-end fashion by “enchanting the color, style, and fabric of garments.” She traveled to Cuba, Panama, Peru, Bolivia, Chile, Argentina, Brazil and the Barbados for her business. She never married and died on July 5, 1938.

According to Walsh, the researcher, in the 1950s the house was owned by Charles W. Danis Sr. and his wife Elizabeth S. Danis. Charles Danis was chairman of the preeminent building and highway construction company Danis Industries, founded by his father B.G. Danis. His company was the contractor for many buildings in the region and in Dayton, including several designed by Schenck and Williams, such as Hawthorn Hill and the Engineers Club of Dayton. He received the Spirit of America Heritage Award in 1975 from Junior Achievement of Dayton and Miami Valley at a dinner attended by 1,200, according to a page-21 article in The Journal Herald on May 1, 1975. He retired from the company in 1983 and died in 1996 at the age of 80. According to an Aug. 5, 2003 Dayton Daily News page-10 article by Sean Strader, Elizabeth Danis, a teacher for many years, was a member of the Dayton Catholic Women’s Club, Dayton Garden Club, and the Dayton Women’s Club. She died in 2003 at the age of 85.

In the 1970s, according to researcher Walsh, the house was owned by John H. Dirck. Dirck was assistant vice president of data processing programming at Citizens Federal Savings and Loan Association. A 1987 Dayton Daily News article said he performed on weekends in the Columbus area with Columbus WCMH-TV Channel 4 newscaster Joe Dirck in a group called The Pink Flamingoes.

Inside, the house has 11 rooms, which include five bedrooms and three bathrooms, a great room with a large fireplace, an office with built-in book shelves, a dining room with built-in display and storage cabinets, a breakfast room, a sunroom, and a full kitchen with a butler's nook.

In 1978 the house was listed on the Ohio Historic Inventory maintained by the Ohio Historic Preservation Office.

The house had a number of owners over the years, fell into disrepair, was cosmetically rehabbed by house flippers who purchased it after foreclosure, and today is owned by Steven and Mary Solomon.

Due to the restoration efforts of the Solomons, the house was selected by Preservation Dayton Inc. for its Excellence in Historic Preservation Award in 2020. The house and the Solomons were featured as the cover story on six pages in the May 5, 2021 Distinctive Homes supplement of The Oakwood Register.
