= OKL =

OKL may refer to:

- Oakleigh Park railway station, London, National Rail station code
- Oberkommando der Luftwaffe, the air force High Command of the Third Reich
- Olive Kettering Library, the library of Antioch College, Ohio
- Oberste Kriegsleitung (Supreme War Command), the supreme command of the Central Powers in the latter part of the First World War
- Old Kentish Sign Language (ISO 639 code okl)
