= Kettering Library =

Kettering Library may refer to:

- Kettering Library, Northamptonshire, public library in Kettering, England, United Kingdom
- Olive Kettering Library, library of Antioch College in Yellow Springs, Ohio, United States
