= Jenet =

Jenet is a surname. Notable people with the surname include:

- Dafna Michaelson Jenet (born 1972), American politician from Colorado
- Veronika Jenet, Australian film editor

Other

- B. Jenet, a character in the Fatal Fury fighting game series
- Jenet Sarsfield (c. 1528–1598), Anglo-Irish noblewoman
- Jenet-Roetter House in Dayton, Ohio, US
