= Charles F. Kettering =

American inventor, engineer and businessman (1876–1958)

Charles Franklin Kettering
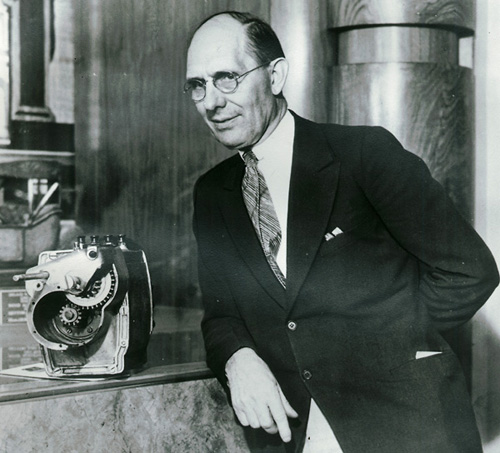
- Kettering circa 1934
- Born: August 29, 1876; Loudonville, Ohio, U.S.
- Died: November 25, 1958 (aged 82); Dayton, Ohio, U.S.
- Education: Ohio State University
- Spouse: Olive Leora Williams (m. 1905)
- Children: Eugene Kettering
- Parent(s): Jacob and Martha Kettering
- Awards: Franklin Medal (1936); Hoover Medal (1955); IEEE Edison Medal (1958)

Charles Franklin Kettering (August 29, 1876 – November 25, 1958) sometimes known as Charles Fredrick Kettering was an American inventor, engineer, businessman, and the holder of 186 patents. He was a founder of Delco, and was head of research at General Motors from 1920 to 1947. Among his most widely used automotive developments were the electrical starting motor and leaded gasoline.

At DuPont, Kettering was also responsible for the development of Duco lacquers and enamels, the first practical colored paints for mass-produced automobiles. While working with the Dayton-Wright Company, he developed the "Bug" aerial torpedo, considered the world's first aerial missile. Kettering led the advancement of practical, lightweight two-stroke diesel engines, revolutionizing the locomotive and heavy equipment industries. In 1927, he founded the Kettering Foundation and was featured on the cover of Time magazine in January 1933.

== Early life ==
Charles was born in Loudonville, Ohio, United States, the fourth of five children of Jacob Henry Kettering and Martha (Hunter) Kettering. Poor eyesight gave him headaches in school. After graduation he followed his sister Emma into a teaching position at Bunker Hill School. By all accounts he was an engaging and innovative teacher. He attracted students to evening scientific demonstrations on electricity, heat, magnetism, and gravity.

He took classes at the College of Wooster, before transferring to Ohio State University. He was a member of the Delta Upsilon fraternity. Eye problems forced him to withdraw, and he took a job as foreman of a telephone line crew. At first, the termination of his studies caused him to be depressed. Then he found ways to apply his electrical engineering skills on the job, and his spirits revived. He also met his future wife, Olive Williams. When his eye condition improved, he was able to return to his studies and graduated from OSU in 1904 with an electrical engineering degree.

== Career ==
=== NCR ===
Kettering was hired directly out of school to head the research laboratory at National Cash Register (later known as NCR Corporation). Kettering invented an easy credit approval system, a precursor to today's credit cards, and the electric cash register in 1906, which made ringing up sales physically much easier for sales clerks. Kettering distinguished himself as a practical inventor. As he said, "I didn't hang around much with other inventors and the executive fellows. I lived with the sales gang. They had some real notion of what people wanted." During his five years at NCR, from 1904 to 1909, Kettering secured 23 patents for NCR. He attributed his success to a good amount of luck but added, "I notice the harder I work, the luckier I get."

=== The Barn Gang ===
Beginning in 1907, his NCR colleague Edward A. Deeds convinced Kettering to develop improvements for the automobile. Deeds and Kettering invited other NCR engineers, including Harold E. Talbott, to join them nights and weekends in their tinkering at Deeds's barn. They became known as the "Barn Gang," and Kettering was called Boss Ket. Their first goal was to find a replacement for the magneto.

=== Delco ===
In 1909, Kettering resigned from NCR to work full-time on automotive developments, and the group incorporated as Dayton Engineering Laboratories Company, or Delco.

==== The self-starter ====
The hand crank used to start early automobiles could kick back under some circumstances. Byron Carter, founder of Cartercar, died from complications after such an accident in Detroit's Belle Isle park. Henry M. Leland – the head of Cadillac – became determined to develop an electric self-starting device. When Leland's engineers failed to develop a self-starter small enough to be practical he consulted Kettering, and Delco developed a practical model by February 1911.

==== Automobile electrical system ====
Kettering's key insight lay in devising an electrical system performing the three functions it still serves in modern cars: starter; producer of spark for ignition; and source of current for lighting. Leland ordered 12,000 self-starters for his 1912 models; Delco had to then transition from its research and development activities to production. The invention won a Dewar Trophy in 1913.

Kettering helped found the Engineers Club of Dayton in 1914.

=== Flxible ===
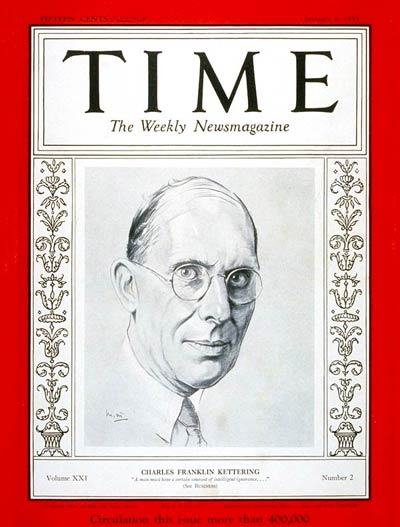
Kettering on the cover of Time magazine in 1933

In 1914, Flxible Sidecar Company was incorporated with the help of Kettering, who then became president of the company and joined the board of directors. Kettering provided significant funding for the company in its early years, particularly after 1916, when Kettering sold his firm, the Dayton Engineering Laboratories Company (Delco), to United Motors Company for $2.5 million. Kettering continued to serve as president of Flxible until he became chairman of the board in 1940, a position that he held until his death in 1958.

=== General Motors ===
Delco was sold to General Motors in 1918, as part of United Motors. Delco became the foundation for the General Motors Research Corporation and Delco Electronics. Kettering became vice-president of General Motors Research Corporation in 1920 and held the position for 27 years.

Between 1918 and 1923, he led the research and development at GM's Dayton research laboratories to commercialize air-cooled engines for cars and trucks. The GM "copper-cooled" automotive engine used fans forcing air across copper fins for heat dissipation. The commercialization, attempted between 1921 and 1923, was unsuccessful due to a combination of factors, nontechnical and technical. Air-cooled engines have had commercial success before and since, used widely in such applications as lawnmowers, small aircraft, and automobiles - notably the Volkswagen Beetle and many generations of Porsche sports cars.

=== Leaded gas ===
Kettering's research in fuel was based on his belief that oil would be in short supply and additives would allow more efficient engines with higher compression. His "high percentage" solution was to mix ethanol with gasoline, while his "low percentage solution" looked for additives that would be added in small quantities to increase what later would be called the octane rating of gasoline. Thomas Midgley Jr. and Kettering identified tetraethyllead (TEL) in December 1921 as an additive that would eliminate engine knocking at a dilution of one thousand to one. While use of ethanol could not be patented, TEL's use as an additive could. Kettering and Midgley secured its patent and proceeded to promote the use of TEL as an additive instead of other options. Kettering became the first president of the newly founded Ethyl Corporation that started to produce TEL in 1923. One year later, he hired Robert A. Kehoe as the medical expert to proclaim that leaded gasoline was safe for humans. That its use was an ecological disaster leading to a global lead contamination was not acknowledged until many decades later.

== Personal life ==
Kettering married Olive Williams of Ashland, Ohio, on August 1, 1905. Their only child, Eugene Williams Kettering, was born on April 20, 1908. Eugene joined Winton Engine in 1930, which was acquired by General Motors and was eventually incorporated into the General Motors Electro-Motive Division (EMD). He became a central figure in the development of the EMD 567 locomotive engine and the Detroit Diesel 6-71 engine, serving at EMD until his retirement in 1960.

Charles Kettering built a house, "Ridgeleigh Terrace", in 1914. According to local sources, it was the first in the United States to have electric air conditioning using freon. Ridgeleigh Terrace was the home of his son, Eugene, until his death. Eugene's wife, Virginia, lived in the house for many years, restoring and redecorating it. In the late 1990s, the house largely destroyed in a fire, and was rebuilt with serious deviation from the original blueprints to accommodate its current use as a conference center.

Some of Charles' memorable quotations are: "It doesn't matter if you try and try and try again, and fail. It does matter if you try and fail, and fail to try again.", "Failures are finger posts on the road to achievement.", "My interest is in the future because I am going to spend the rest of my life there." .

Kettering died on November 25, 1958. After his death, his body lay in honor at the Engineers Club and then was interred in the mausoleum at Woodland Cemetery, Dayton, Ohio.

== Legacy ==
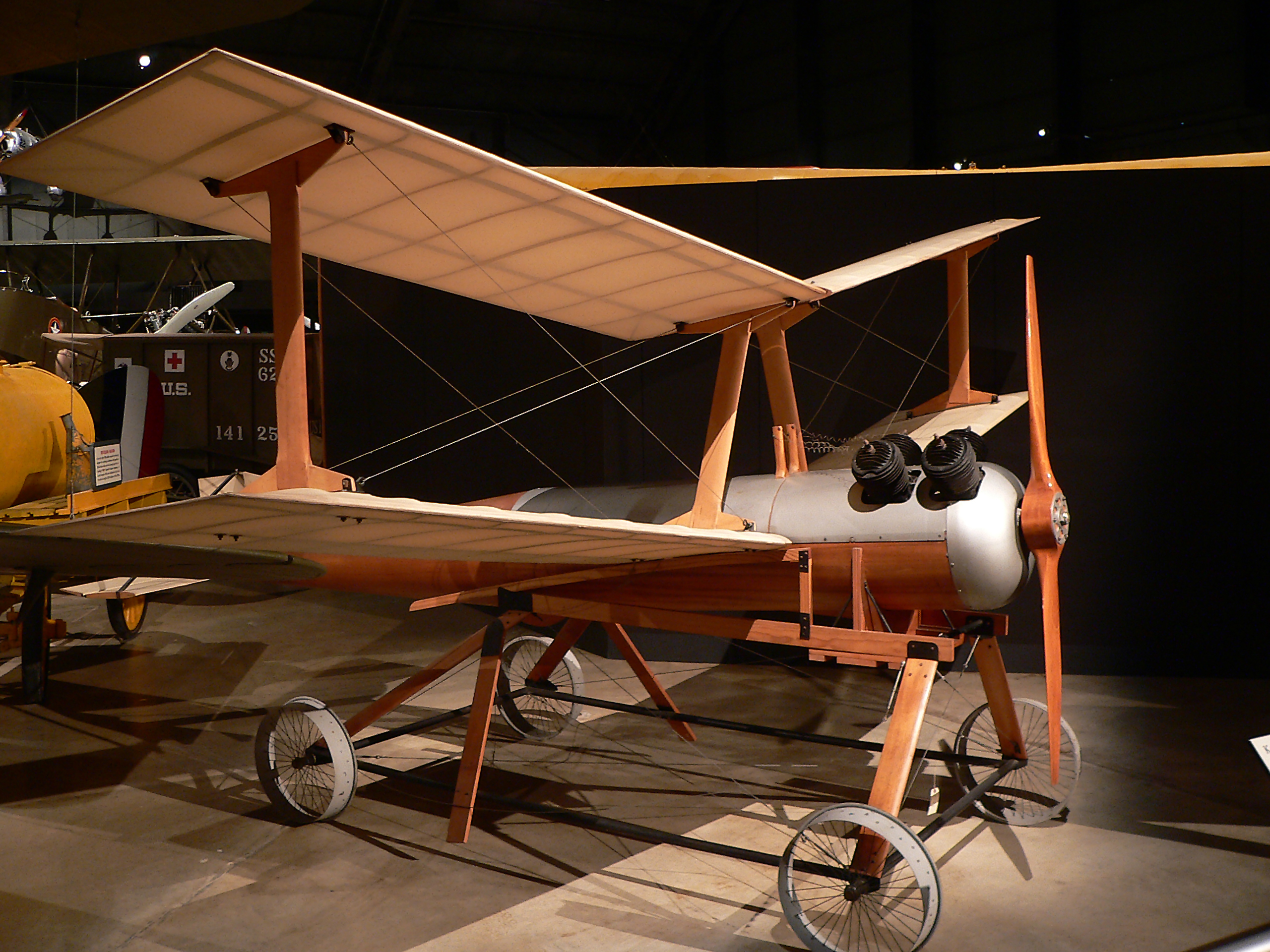
Model of Kettering aerial torpedo on display at National Museum of the United States Air Force in Dayton, Ohio

Max D. Liston, one of Kettering's co-workers at GM, described him "one of the gods of the automotive field, particularly from an inventive standpoint." Liston quoted Kettering as advising him, "People won't ever remember how many failures you've had, but they will remember how well it worked the last time you tried it."

Kettering and Deeds had a lifelong business, professional and personal relationship. In 1914, recognizing that Dayton was among the leading industrial cities in the US because of the skilled engineers and technicians in the city, they founded the Engineers Club of Dayton and the Foreman's Club of Dayton, which later on became the National Management Association.

Kettering held 186 U.S. patents. He invented the all-electric starting, ignition, and lighting system for automobiles. Electric starters replaced crank (manual) starting of automobiles. First incorporated in the 1912 Cadillac, all-electric starting aided in the growth of the US auto industry by making the automobile easy for anyone to start. Other patents included a portable lighting system and an incubator for premature infants. His engine-driven generator was combined with storage batteries to form a "Delco Plant", providing electrical power for farmsteads and other locations far from the power grid.

In 1918 Kettering designed the "aerial torpedo", nicknamed the Kettering Bug.

Kettering and colleagues' development of leaded gasoline ultimately caused the release of large quantities of lead into the atmosphere as a result of the combustion of leaded gasoline all over the world. Due to the neurotoxic effects of lead, leaded gasoline has been widely banned since the late 1990s. The development of Freon using CFCs has been implicated in the depletion of the ozone layer.

He developed the idea of Duco paint and helped develop diesel engines and ways to harness solar energy. He was a pioneer in the application of magnetism to medical diagnostic techniques.

His inventions, especially the electric automobile starter, made him wealthy. In 1945, he helped found what became the Memorial Sloan Kettering Cancer Center, based on the premise that American industrial research techniques could be applied to cancer research.. His son and daughter-in-law, Eugene and Virginia, created Kettering Medical Center in Ohio, as a tribute to Charles Kettering's life and his work in healthcare research.

On January 1, 1998, the former General Motors Institute changed its name to Kettering University to honor Kettering as a founder.

=== Awards ===
- He was awarded the Franklin Medal in 1936.
- He was awarded the Hoover Medal in 1955.
- He was awarded the IEEE Edison Medal in 1958.

=== Honors ===
- He was elected to the United States National Academy of Sciences in 1928.
- He was elected to the American Philosophical Society in 1930.

=== Memorials ===
In 1998, GMI Engineering and Management Institute (formerly General Motors Institute), of Flint, Michigan, changed its name to Kettering University in honor of Kettering. His ideals, prowess, and belief in co-operative education continue there. Kettering is also remembered through the Memorial Sloan-Kettering Cancer Center, a cancer research and treatment center in New York City, and through the Kettering Health Network, which includes several hospitals and medical center campuses as well as Kettering College in Kettering, Ohio.

The city of Kettering, Ohio, a suburb of Dayton, was named after him when it was incorporated in 1955.

The former U.S. Army Air Service testing field, McCook Field, is now a Dayton park called Kettering Field.

Several U.S. public schools are named after him:

- Charles F. Kettering Sr. High School in Detroit, Michigan
- Charles F. Kettering High School in Waterford, Michigan
- Charles F. Kettering Elementary School in Ypsilanti, Michigan
- Charles F. Kettering Elementary School in Long Beach, California
- Kettering Fairmont High School in Kettering, Ohio
- Kettering Elementary School in Westland, Michigan (now closed and demolished)
- The Department of Environmental Health at the University of Cincinnati is housed in the Kettering Lab

The endowed Olive Williams Kettering Chair of The College of Wooster Department of Music is named in honor of his wife.

The University of Dayton's engineering building, Kettering Labs, is named after him.

The Kettering Science center on the Ashland University campus in Ohio is named for him.

Kettering Hall at Wilmington College is named for him, also Kettering Hall of Science at Oberlin College.

At Antioch College, the 1929 Science Building he donated was not named after him (it is now the Arts and Science Building), but the school's 33.000-square-foot Charles F. Kettering Building was (the same being originally a research facility, now home to campus radio station WYSO), while the college's Olive Kettering Library was named after his wife.

== Patents ==
Patents Listing Charles F. Kettering as an Inventor
| Patent ID | Title | Inventors | Location |
| US-1760845-A | Drive-shaft connection for motor-driven vehicles | Charles F Kettering, Charles R Short | https://patents.google.com/patent/US1760845A/en |
| US-2688056-A | Humidistat | Charles F Kettering, Frank J Roselandt | https://patents.google.com/patent/US2688056A/en |
| CA-168156-A | Electric system for engines | Charles F. Kettering, Filliam A. Chryst | https://patents.google.com/patent/CA168156A/en |
| US-1552170-A | Weighing machine | Charles F Kettering, Charles L Lee | https://patents.google.com/patent/US1552170A/en |
| US-1707732-A | Frame construction for automobile chassis | Charles F Kettering, Charles R Short | https://patents.google.com/patent/US1707732A/en |
| US-1607200-A | Fuel-supply system | Charles F Kettering, Charles L Lee | https://patents.google.com/patent/US1607200A/en |
| US-1644731-A | Internal-combustion engine | Charles F Kettering, Charles R Short | https://patents.google.com/patent/US1644731A/en |
| AU-656306-A | Improvements in electric driving devices for cash registers | Davion Montgomery Chio U. SA Charles F. Kettering | https://patents.google.com/patent/AU656306A/en |
| US-1561083-A | Vehicle frame | Charles F Kettering | https://patents.google.com/patent/US1561083A/en |
| US-1599899-A | Diaphragm pump | Charles F Kettering, George A Buvinger | https://patents.google.com/patent/US1599899A/en |
| US-1718238-A | System of gas control | Charles F Kettering, William A Chryst | https://patents.google.com/patent/US1718238A/en |
| US-1404152-A | Fuel-supply system | Charles F Kettering | https://patents.google.com/patent/US1404152A/en |
| US-2417112-A | Electrical control system | Charles F Kettering | https://patents.google.com/patent/US2417112A/en |
| US-1978463-A | Refrigeration | Charles F Kettering | https://patents.google.com/patent/US1978463A/en |
| US-1721808-A | Heat-exchange apparatus | Charles F Kettering | https://patents.google.com/patent/US1721808A/en |
| US-1453358-A | Process of joining metals | Charles F Kettering | https://patents.google.com/patent/US1453358A/en |
| US-1795865-A | Hydraulic slack adjuster | Charles F Kettering | https://patents.google.com/patent/US1795865A/en |
| US-1605663-A | Motor fuel | Charles F Kettering Jr Thomas Midgley | https://patents.google.com/patent/US1605663A/en |
| US-2159741-A | Bed air conditioning apparatus | Charles F Kettering, Edwin C Sittler | https://patents.google.com/patent/US2159741A/en |
| US-2130092-A | Refrigerating apparatus | Charles F Kettering | https://patents.google.com/patent/US2130092A/en |
| US-2543500-A | Means for suppressing transverse modes of oscillation in a piezoelectric crystal | Charles F Kettering, Wesley S Erwin | https://patents.google.com/patent/US2543500A/en |
| US-2093968-A | Refrigerating apparatus | Charles F Kettering | https://patents.google.com/patent/US2093968A/en |
| US-1430524-A | Engine | Charles F Kettering | https://patents.google.com/patent/US1430524A/en |
| US-1624139-A | Fuel-supply device | Charles F Kettering | https://patents.google.com/patent/US1624139A/en |
| US-1331649-A | Ventilating system | Charles F Kettering | https://patents.google.com/patent/US1331649A/en |
| US-1668508-A | Process of making air-cooled cylinders | Charles F Kettering | https://patents.google.com/patent/US1668508A/en |
| US-975533-A | Store-service credit-system apparatus. | Charles F Kettering | https://patents.google.com/patent/US975533A/en |
| US-1529190-A | Condenser | Charles F Kettering | https://patents.google.com/patent/US1529190A/en |
| US-2130093-A | Refrigerating apparatus | Charles F Kettering | https://patents.google.com/patent/US2130093A/en |
| US-2399640-A | Temperature sensitive means | Charles F Kettering | https://patents.google.com/patent/US2399640A/en |
| US-1122605-A | Store-service credit-system apparatus. | Charles F Kettering | https://patents.google.com/patent/US1122605A/en |
| US-2563341-A | Humidity control | Charles F Kettering | https://patents.google.com/patent/US2563341A/en |
| US-2760023-A | Humidistat | Charles F Kettering, Kauno E Sihvonen, Thomas C Van Degrift | https://patents.google.com/patent/US2760023A/en |
| US-2432667-A | Automatic control | Charles F Kettering, Albert W Fischer | https://patents.google.com/patent/US2432667A/en |
| US-2377633-A | Variable pitch propeller control | Charles F Kettering | https://patents.google.com/patent/US2377633A/en |
| US-1137061-A | Cash-register. | Charles F Kettering, William A Chryst | https://patents.google.com/patent/US1137061A/en |
| US-1463958-A | Magneto ignition system | Charles F Kettering | https://patents.google.com/patent/US1463958A/en |
| US-2080487-A | Synchronous control of clutch servos | Charles F Kettering | https://patents.google.com/patent/US2080487A/en |
| US-2007608-A | Two cycle engine | Charles F Kettering | https://patents.google.com/patent/US2007608A/en |
| US-1948818-A | Method and means for making air cooled cylinders | Charles F Kettering | https://patents.google.com/patent/US1948818A/en |
| US-1464908-A | Steering-post lock | Charles F Kettering | https://patents.google.com/patent/US1464908A/en |
| US-1293468-A | Engine starting device. | Charles F Kettering | https://patents.google.com/patent/US1293468A/en |
| US-1231266-A | Engine-starting device. | Charles F Kettering | https://patents.google.com/patent/US1231266A/en |
| US-1223180-A | Ignition system. | Charles F Kettering | https://patents.google.com/patent/US1223180A/en |
| US-959548-A | Electric driving device for registering-machines. | Charles F Kettering | https://patents.google.com/patent/US959548A/en |
| US-1191976-A | Current-interrupter. | Charles F Kettering | https://patents.google.com/patent/US1191976A/en |
| US-1635216-A | Method and means for using low-compression fuels | Charles F Kettering Jr Thomas Midgley | https://patents.google.com/patent/US1635216A/en |
| US-2377698-A | Automatic control | Charles F Kettering, Albert W Fischer | https://patents.google.com/patent/US2377698A/en |
| US-1529191-A | Magnetic clutch | Charles F Kettering | https://patents.google.com/patent/US1529191A/en |
| US-910690-A | Driving mechanism for registering-machines. | Charles F Kettering | https://patents.google.com/patent/US910690A/en |
| US-1338987-A | System of electrical generation and control | Charles F Kettering | https://patents.google.com/patent/US1338987A/en |
| US-1663709-A | Cooling device for valves and the like | Charles F Kettering | https://patents.google.com/patent/US1663709A/en |
| US-1066432-A | Control for electric-lighting systems. | Charles F Kettering | https://patents.google.com/patent/US1066432A/en |
| US-2098295-A | Method of and apparatus for creating an artificial fever | Charles F Kettering, Edwin C Sittler | https://patents.google.com/patent/US2098295A/en |
| US-1231264-A | Ignition device. | Charles F Kettering | https://patents.google.com/patent/US1231264A/en |
| US-1623121-A | Control apparatus | Charles F Kettering | https://patents.google.com/patent/US1623121A/en |
| US-1037492-A | Ignition system. | Charles F Kettering | https://patents.google.com/patent/US1037492A/en |
| US-1664366-A | Fuel-supply system | Charles F Kettering | https://patents.google.com/patent/US1664366A/en |
| US-1167762-A | Ignition system. | Charles F Kettering | https://patents.google.com/patent/US1167762A/en |
| US-1150523-A | Engine-starting device. | Charles F Kettering | https://patents.google.com/patent/US1150523A/en |
| US-2407555-A | Automatic control | Charles F Kettering | https://patents.google.com/patent/US2407555A/en |
| US-1710991-A | Automatically controlled transmission for motor vehicles | Charles F Kettering | https://patents.google.com/patent/US1710991A/en |
| US-1144418-A | Cash-register. | Charles F Kettering, William A Chryst | https://patents.google.com/patent/US1144418A/en |
| US-2458784-A | Automatic control | Charles F Kettering, Albert W Fischer | https://patents.google.com/patent/US2458784A/en |
| US-1650524-A | Electrical apparatus | Charles F Kettering | https://patents.google.com/patent/US1650524A/en |
| US-923857-A | Mechanical clutch. | Charles F Kettering | https://patents.google.com/patent/US923857A/en |
| US-1380974-A | Internal-combustion engine | Charles F Kettering | https://patents.google.com/patent/US1380974A/en |
| US-1507293-A | Cylinder construction | Charles F Kettering, William B Earnshaw | https://patents.google.com/patent/US1507293A/en |
| US-1815315-A | Refrigerating apparatus | Charles F Kettering | https://patents.google.com/patent/US1815315A/en |
| US-1886339-A | Refrigerating apparatus | Charles F Kettering | https://patents.google.com/patent/US1886339A/en |
| US-1410682-A | Fuel-supply device | Charles F Kettering | https://patents.google.com/patent/US1410682A/en |
| US-1793857-A | Refrigerating apparatus | Charles F Kettering, Otto M Summers | https://patents.google.com/patent/US1793857A/en |
| US-1512029-A | Water system | Charles F Kettering, George A Buvinger | https://patents.google.com/patent/US1512029A/en |
| US-1243422-A | Engine-starting system. | Charles F Kettering, William A Chryst | https://patents.google.com/patent/US1243422A/en |
| US-1511201-A | Internal-combustion engine | Charles F Kettering | https://patents.google.com/patent/US1511201A/en |
| US-1170275-A | Ignition system. | Charles F Kettering | https://patents.google.com/patent/US1170275A/en |
| US-1650523-A | Electrical apparatus | Charles F Kettering, Joseph C Federle | https://patents.google.com/patent/US1650523A/en |
| US-1557206-A | Fuel-supply device | Charles F Kettering | https://patents.google.com/patent/US1557206A/en |
| US-1255177-A | Ignition system for combustion-engines. | Charles F Kettering | https://patents.google.com/patent/US1255177A/en |
| US-1434013-A | Engine-control system | Charles F Kettering | https://patents.google.com/patent/US1434013A/en |
| US-1116440-A | Indicating mechanism. | Charles F Kettering | https://patents.google.com/patent/US1116440A/en |
| US-2456198-A | Control | Charles F Kettering, Albert W Fischer | https://patents.google.com/patent/US2456198A/en |
| US-1046605-A | Electric railway-gate. | Charles F Kettering | https://patents.google.com/patent/US1046605A/en |
| US-1508700-A | Protecting device | Charles F Kettering | https://patents.google.com/patent/US1508700A/en |
| US-1507292-A | System of gas control | Charles F Kettering, William A Chryst | https://patents.google.com/patent/US1507292A/en |
| US-1183074-A | Engine-starting device. | Charles F Kettering | https://patents.google.com/patent/US1183074A/en |
| US-1783921-A | Container for removing carbon | Charles F Kettering | https://patents.google.com/patent/US1783921A/en |
| US-1336143-A | Circuit-breaker indicating device | Charles F Kettering | https://patents.google.com/patent/US1336143A/en |
| US-1272056-A | Ignition system. | Charles F Kettering | https://patents.google.com/patent/US1272056A/en |
| US-1168314-A | Ignition system. | Charles F Kettering | https://patents.google.com/patent/US1168314A/en |
| US-1004881-A | Cash-register. | Charles F Kettering | https://patents.google.com/patent/US1004881A/en |
| US-1697818-A | Air-cooled engine | Charles F Kettering | https://patents.google.com/patent/US1697818A/en |
| US-1142102-A | Store-service credit-system apparatus. | Charles F Kettering | https://patents.google.com/patent/US1142102A/en |
| US-1089771-A | Binding-post. | Charles F Kettering | https://patents.google.com/patent/US1089771A/en |
| US-1913887-A | Motor starting device | Charles F Kettering, Orin E Marvel | https://patents.google.com/patent/US1913887A/en |
| US-1605664-A | Motor fuel | Charles F Kettering Jr Thomas Midgley | https://patents.google.com/patent/US1605664A/en |
| US-1529188-A | Internal-combustion engine | Charles F Kettering | https://patents.google.com/patent/US1529188A/en |
| US-1258785-A | Engine-starting system. | Charles F Kettering, William A Chryst | https://patents.google.com/patent/US1258785A/en |
| US-1665307-A | Cooling system for internal-combustion engines | Charles F Kettering | https://patents.google.com/patent/US1665307A/en |
| US-1448749-A | Electrical system | Charles F Kettering | https://patents.google.com/patent/US1448749A/en |
| US-1041802-A | Recording-key. | Charles F Kettering | https://patents.google.com/patent/US1041802A/en |
| US-924616-A | Driving mechanism for cash-registers. | Charles F Kettering | https://patents.google.com/patent/US924616A/en |
| US-1254811-A | Engine starting, lighting, and ignition system. | Charles F Kettering | https://patents.google.com/patent/US1254811A/en |
| US-1284365-A | Electric machine. | Charles F Kettering, William A Chryst | https://patents.google.com/patent/US1284365A/en |
| US-1259995-A | System of selective electrical distribution. | Charles F Kettering, William A Chryst | https://patents.google.com/patent/US1259995A/en |
| US-1102593-A | Ignition system. | Charles F Kettering | https://patents.google.com/patent/US1102593A/en |
| US-1005555-A | Cash-register. | Charles F Kettering | https://patents.google.com/patent/US1005555A/en |
| US-1163092-A | Timer or current-interrupter. | Charles F Kettering | https://patents.google.com/patent/US1163092A/en |
| US-1108185-A | Store-service-credit-system apparatus. | Charles F Kettering | https://patents.google.com/patent/US1108185A/en |
| US-1040349-A | Ignition system. | Charles F Kettering | https://patents.google.com/patent/US1040349A/en |
| US-1233370-A | Control for electrical systems. | Charles F Kettering | https://patents.google.com/patent/US1233370A/en |
| US-1225820-A | Electric switch. | Charles F Kettering, Robert S De Maree | https://patents.google.com/patent/US1225820A/en |
| US-1501853-A | System of electrical generation | Charles F Kettering, William A Chryst | https://patents.google.com/patent/US1501853A/en |
| US-1265454-A | Ignition system. | Charles F Kettering, William A Chryst | https://patents.google.com/patent/US1265454A/en |
| US-1501561-A | Engine construction | Charles F Kettering | https://patents.google.com/patent/US1501561A/en |
| US-1131246-A | Illuminated cash-register indicator. | Charles F Kettering, William A Chryst | https://patents.google.com/patent/US1131246A/en |
| US-1110392-A | Cash-register. | Charles F Kettering, William A Chryst | https://patents.google.com/patent/US1110392A/en |
| US-1196243-A | Engine-starting device. | Charles F Kettering | https://patents.google.com/patent/US1196243A/en |
| US-1109763-A | Registering mechanism. | Charles F Kettering | https://patents.google.com/patent/US1109763A/en |
| US-1405519-A | Brush mounting | Charles F Kettering, William A Chryst | https://patents.google.com/patent/US1405519A/en |
| US-1514970-A | Hydrometer | Charles F Kettering | https://patents.google.com/patent/US1514970A/en |
| US-1337363-A | System of electrical distribution and control | Charles F Kettering | https://patents.google.com/patent/US1337363A/en |
| US-1690341-A | Air cleaner | Charles F Kettering | https://patents.google.com/patent/US1690341A/en |
| US-2150880-A | Control means for refrigerating apparatus | Charles F Kettering | https://patents.google.com/patent/US2150880A/en |
| US-1241990-A | Engine-starting device. | Charles F Kettering, William A Chryst | https://patents.google.com/patent/US1241990A/en |
| US-1151190-A | Multiple cash register and recorder. | Charles F Kettering, William A Chryst | https://patents.google.com/patent/US1151190A/en |
| US-1622154-A | Electrical system for automotive vehicles | Charles F Kettering, John H Hunt | https://patents.google.com/patent/US1622154A/en |
| CA-131319-A | Cash register | William A. Chryst, Charles F. Kettering | https://patents.google.com/patent/CA131319A/en |
| US-1211378-A | System of selective electrical distribution. | Charles F Kettering, William A Chryst | https://patents.google.com/patent/US1211378A/en |
| US-1253389-A | Ignition system. | Charles F Kettering, William A Chryst | https://patents.google.com/patent/US1253389A/en |
| US-1585994-A | Water system | Charles F Kettering, George A Buvinger | https://patents.google.com/patent/US1585994A/en |
| US-1231265-A | Control for electrical systems. | Charles F Kettering | https://patents.google.com/patent/US1231265A/en |
| US-1025277-A | Cash-register. | Charles F Kettering, William A Chryst | https://patents.google.com/patent/US1025277A/en |
| US-1642034-A | System of electrical distribution and control | Charles F Kettering, William A Chryst | https://patents.google.com/patent/US1642034A/en |
| US-1190175-A | Ignition system. | Charles F Kettering | https://patents.google.com/patent/US1190175A/en |
| US-1698265-A | Water system | Charles F Kettering, George A Buvinger | https://patents.google.com/patent/US1698265A/en |
| US-1435966-A | Ignition system | Charles F Kettering | https://patents.google.com/patent/US1435966A/en |
| US-1192906-A | Current-interrupter. | Charles F Kettering | https://patents.google.com/patent/US1192906A/en |
| US-1162073-A | Current-interrupter. | Charles F Kettering | https://patents.google.com/patent/US1162073A/en |
| US-1465644-A | Ignition apparatus | Charles F Kettering, William A Chryst | https://patents.google.com/patent/US1465644A/en |
| US-1441430-A | Hydrometer circuit closer | Charles F Kettering | https://patents.google.com/patent/US1441430A/en |
| US-1273870-A | Engine starting device. | Charles F Kettering, William A Chryst | https://patents.google.com/patent/US1273870A/en |
| US-1240348-A | Engine-starting device. | Charles F Kettering | https://patents.google.com/patent/US1240348A/en |
| US-1557205-A | Automatic switch | Charles F Kettering | https://patents.google.com/patent/US1557205A/en |
| US-939267-A | Store-service credit-system apparatus. | Charles F Kettering | https://patents.google.com/patent/US939267A/en |
| US-1401337-A | Electrical system for engines | Charles F Kettering, William A Chryst | https://patents.google.com/patent/US1401337A/en |
| US-959059-A | Adding and subtracting machine. | Charles F Kettering | https://patents.google.com/patent/US959059A/en |
| US-1011966-A | Cash-register. | Charles F Kettering, William A Chryst | https://patents.google.com/patent/US1011966A/en |
| US-1166527-A | Registering mechanism. | Charles F Kettering | https://patents.google.com/patent/US1166527A/en |
| US-1336142-A | Circuit-breaker indicating device | Charles F Kettering | https://patents.google.com/patent/US1336142A/en |
| US-1233369-A | Ignition system. | Charles F Kettering | https://patents.google.com/patent/US1233369A/en |
| US-1273871-A | Engine starting system. | Charles F Kettering, William A Chryst | https://patents.google.com/patent/US1273871A/en |
| US-1284707-A | Electrical storage system. | Charles F Kettering | https://patents.google.com/patent/US1284707A/en |
| US-1501491-A | Spark plug | Charles F Kettering | https://patents.google.com/patent/US1501491A/en |
| US-1250188-A | Engine-starting system. | Charles F Kettering, William A Chryst | https://patents.google.com/patent/US1250188A/en |
| US-1272055-A | Electrical system for engines. | Charles F Kettering, William A Chryst | https://patents.google.com/patent/US1272055A/en |
| US-1489324-A | Internal-combustion engine | Charles F Kettering | https://patents.google.com/patent/US1489324A/en |
| US-1137062-A | Cash and autographic register. | Charles F Kettering, William A Chryst | https://patents.google.com/patent/US1137062A/en |
| CA-169225-A | Ignition system | Charles F. Kettering | https://patents.google.com/patent/CA169225A/en |
| US-1293467-A | System of selective electrical distribution. | Charles F Kettering, William A Chryst | https://patents.google.com/patent/US1293467A/en |
| US-1501852-A | Engine-starting system | Charles F Kettering | https://patents.google.com/patent/US1501852A/en |
| US-1184858-A | Engine-starting device. | Charles F Kettering | https://patents.google.com/patent/US1184858A/en |
| US-1644732-A | Internal-combustion engine | Charles F Kettering | https://patents.google.com/patent/US1644732A/en |
| US-976577-A | Driving device for registering-machines. | Charles F Kettering | https://patents.google.com/patent/US976577A/en |
| US-1337364-A | System of electrical generation and control | Charles F Kettering | https://patents.google.com/patent/US1337364A/en |
| US-1154025-A | Electric meter. | Charles F Kettering | https://patents.google.com/patent/US1154025A/en |
| US-1037491-A | Ignition apparatus for explosion-motors. | Charles F Kettering | https://patents.google.com/patent/US1037491A/en |
| US-1301851-A | Ignition system. | Charles F Kettering | https://patents.google.com/patent/US1301851A/en |
| US-1529189-A | Internal-combustion engine | Charles F Kettering | https://patents.google.com/patent/US1529189A/en |
| US-1229754-A | Electric machine. | Charles F Kettering, William A Chryst | https://patents.google.com/patent/US1229754A/en |
| CA-168155-A | Electric starting system for engines | William A. Chryst, Charles F. Kettering | https://patents.google.com/patent/CA168155A/en |
| CA-157952-A | Engine starting system | Charles F. Kettering, William A. Chryst | https://patents.google.com/patent/CA157952A/en |
| CA-157951-A | Engine starter | Charles F. Kettering, William A. Chryst | https://patents.google.com/patent/CA157951A/en |
| CA-169991-A | Engine starting system | Charles F. Kettering, William A. Chryst | https://patents.google.com/patent/CA169991A/en |
| CA-160277-A | Control for electrical systems | Charles F. Kettering | https://patents.google.com/patent/CA160277A/en |
| CA-160276-A | Control for electrical systems | Charles F. Kettering | https://patents.google.com/patent/CA160276A/en |
| CA-155575-A | Starterm for electric machines | William A. Chryst, Charles F. Kettering | https://patents.google.com/patent/CA155575A/en |
| CA-146550-A | Engine starting device | Charles F. Kettering | https://patents.google.com/patent/CA146550A/en |
| CA-143409-A | Engine starting device | Charles F. Kettering | https://patents.google.com/patent/CA143409A/en |
| CA-188336-A | Electrical power system | Charles F. Kettering | https://patents.google.com/patent/CA188336A/en |
| CA-172616-A | Engine starting system | William A. Chryst, Charles F. Kettering | https://patents.google.com/patent/CA172616A/en |
| CA-143408-A | Engine starting device | Charles F. Kettering | https://patents.google.com/patent/CA143408A/en |
| CA-162212-A | Electrical distribution for engines | William A. Chryst, Charles F. Kettering | https://patents.google.com/patent/CA162212A/en |
| CA-109012-A | Store service system | Charles F. Kettering | https://patents.google.com/patent/CA109012A/en |
| CA-146144-A | Cash register | William A. Chryst, Charles F. Kettering | https://patents.google.com/patent/CA146144A/en |
| CA-143406-A | Engine starting device | Charles F. Kettering | https://patents.google.com/patent/CA143406A/en |
| CA-143407-A | Engine starting and lighting system | Charles F. Kettering | https://patents.google.com/patent/CA143407A/en |
| CA-146549-A | Engine starting device | Charles F. Kettering | https://patents.google.com/patent/CA146549A/en |
| CA-162268-A | Ignition system | Charles F. Kettering | https://patents.google.com/patent/CA162268A/en |
| CA-188335-A | Electrical power system | Charles F. Kettering | https://patents.google.com/patent/CA188335A/en |
| CA-170373-A | Registering mechanism | Charles F. Kettering | https://patents.google.com/patent/CA170373A/en |
| CA-123235-A | Cash register | William A. Chryst, Charles F. Kettering | https://patents.google.com/patent/CA123235A/en |
| US-1454644-A | Electric speedometer | Charles F Kettering | https://patents.google.com/patent/US1454644A/en |
| CA-168863-A | Cash register | Charles F. Kettering, William A. Chryst | https://patents.google.com/patent/CA168863A/en |
| US-1191083-A | Electric machine. | Charles F Kettering | https://patents.google.com/patent/US1191083A/en |
| CA-150641-A | Ignition system | Charles F. Kettering | https://patents.google.com/patent/CA150641A/en |
| CA-226877-A | Electric speedometer | F. Kettering Charles | https://patents.google.com/patent/CA226877A/en |
| CA-216052-A | Engine starting system | F. Kettering Charles | https://patents.google.com/patent/CA216052A/en |
| CA-297618-A | Refrigerating apparatus | F. Kettering Charles | https://patents.google.com/patent/CA297618A/en |
| CA-216053-A | Cooling device for valves | F. Kettering Charles | https://patents.google.com/patent/CA216053A/en |
| CA-241995-A | Electrical distribution | F. Kettering Charles, A. Chryst William | https://patents.google.com/patent/CA241995A/en |
| CA-216050-A | Cooling device for valves | F. Kettering Charles | https://patents.google.com/patent/CA216050A/en |
| CA-242144-A | Automatic switch | F. Kettering Charles | https://patents.google.com/patent/CA242144A/en |
| CA-235636-A | Battery charging system | F. Kettering Charles | https://patents.google.com/patent/CA235636A/en |
| CA-235440-A | System of electrical generation | F. Kettering Charles | https://patents.google.com/patent/CA235440A/en |
| CA-251507-A | Water system | F. Kettering Charles, A. Buvinger George | https://patents.google.com/patent/CA251507A/en |
| CA-437435-A | Variable pitch propeller control | F. Kettering Charles | https://patents.google.com/patent/CA437435A/en |
| CA-239777-A | Water system | A. Buvinger George, F. Kettering Charles | https://patents.google.com/patent/CA239777A/en |
| CA-251326-A | Motor fuel | Thomas Midgley Jr., F. Kettering Charles | https://patents.google.com/patent/CA251326A/en |
| CA-241994-A | System of electrical generation | F. Kettering Charles, A. Chryst William | https://patents.google.com/patent/CA241994A/en |
| CA-235441-A | System of electrical generation | F. Kettering Charles | https://patents.google.com/patent/CA235441A/en |
| AU-656306-B | Improvements in electric driving devices for cash registers | F Kettering Davion Montgomery Chio U Sa Charles | https://patents.google.com/patent/AU656306B/en |

== See also ==
- Thomas Midgley Jr.
- Methylcyclopentadienyl manganese tricarbonyl
- Leaded gasoline
- Tetraethyllead
- Lists of covers of Time magazine
- Oldsmobile V8 engine

== Sources ==
- Bernstein, Mark (1996). Grand Eccentrics: Turning the Century: Dayton and the Inventing of America. Wilmington: Orange Frazer Press.
- Boyd, Thomas Alvin (1957). Professional Amateur: The Biography of Charles Franklin Kettering. New York, NY, USA: E. P. Dutton & Co. LCCN 57005336. OCLC 565024.
- Boyd, Thomas Alvin (2002) [1957]. Charles F. Kettering: A Biography. Beard Books. ISBN 9781587981333. Reprint of Boyd 1957.
- Cornelisse, Diana G. (2002). Splendid Vision, Unswerving Purpose: Developing Air Power for the United States Air Force During the First Century of Powered Flight. Wright-Patterson Air Force Base, Ohio: U.S. Air Force Publications. ISBN 0-16-067599-5 – via Internet Archive.
- Dauvergne, Peter (2008). The Shadows of Consumption. MIT Press. ISBN 978-0-262-04246-8.
- Kovarik, William (2006). "Ethyl-leaded gasoline: how a classic occupational disease became an international public health disaster" (PDF). International Journal of Occupational and Environmental Health. 11 (4): 384–397. doi:10.1179/oeh.2005.11.4.384. PMID 16350473. S2CID 44633845. Archived from the original (PDF) on July 11, 2014.
- Leland, Wilfred C.; Millbrook, Minnie Dubbs (1996) [1966]. Master of Precision: Henry M. Leland. Detroit: Wayne State University Press.
- Sloan, Alfred P. (1990) [1964]. McDonald, John (ed.). My Years with General Motors. Garden City, NY, USA: Doubleday. ISBN 9780385042352. LCCN 64011306. OCLC 802024.
- Leslie, Stuart W. (1983). Boss Kettering: Wizard of General Motors. New York: Columbia University Press.
