= Schenck & Williams =

Architectural firm in Dayton, Ohio, US

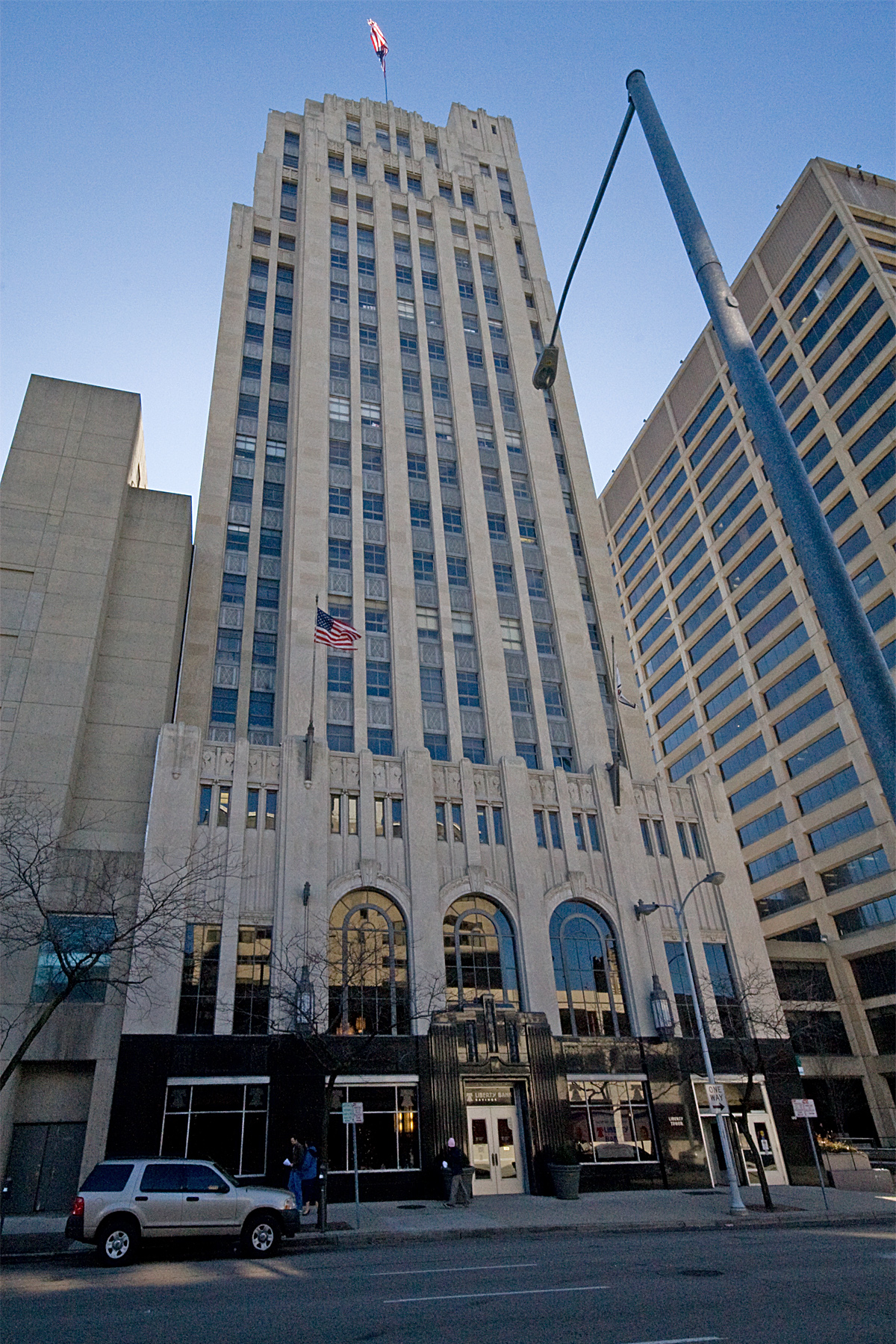
Mutual Home Savings/ Liberty Tower (Dayton)

Schenck and Williams was an architectural firm in Dayton, Ohio. The firm's projects included the Hawthorn Hill home for Orville Wright and his sister and father, the Dayton Young Men's Christian Association Building, and the Engineers Club of Dayton building. The firm's partners were Harry J. Williams and Harry I. Schenck, both 1903 Cornell University graduates and members of the American Institute of Architects Several other Cornell graduates including Nelson J. Bell (1904), Robert E. Schenck (1912), Albert R. Reilly (1914), Wolfe Marcovitch (1915), Leslie L. Lambert (1916), Ernst W. Kurz (1917) and Ellason R. Smith (1917) came to work for the firm.

The partners were members of the Engineers Club of Dayton and designed its building in 1916. Workers completed the construction of the Engineers Club in early 1918. Harry I. Schenck was a charter club member. Architectural Record (in volume 45) included a long article about the club and its building, including a photograph and floor plans. The Club was described as a special collaboration between engineers, who supported it, and architects, and the article's author noted that it was designed in the Georgian architectural style.

== Projects ==
- Pleasant Hill United Church of Christ, 10 W. Monument Street in Pleasant Hill, Ohio
- Hawthorn Hill (1912-1914), National Historic Landmark
- Engineers Club of Dayton (1918), NRHP-listed
- Liberty Tower (Dayton)
- Charles F. Kettering House (1914), National Historic Landmark. Destroyed by fire in 1997.
- Ashland National Bank building (1922), an 11-story bank building at the "heart of downtown" Ashland, Kentucky
- Graphic Arts Building (1925), Dayton.
- Dayton Power and Light Building 601,607-609, 613-645 E. Third St., Dayton, Ohio. Listed on the National Register of Historic Places since April 12, 2006.
- Jenet-Roetter House (1913), 148 Squirrel Road in the Five Oaks District, Dayton, Ohio, is a notable example of Prairie Style architecture and is designated as a Dayton Historic Landmark.
- Dayton YMCA Building (1929), Dayton.
