= Charles F. Kettering House =

Historic house in Ohio, United States

- U.S. National Register of Historic Places
- U.S. National Historic Landmark
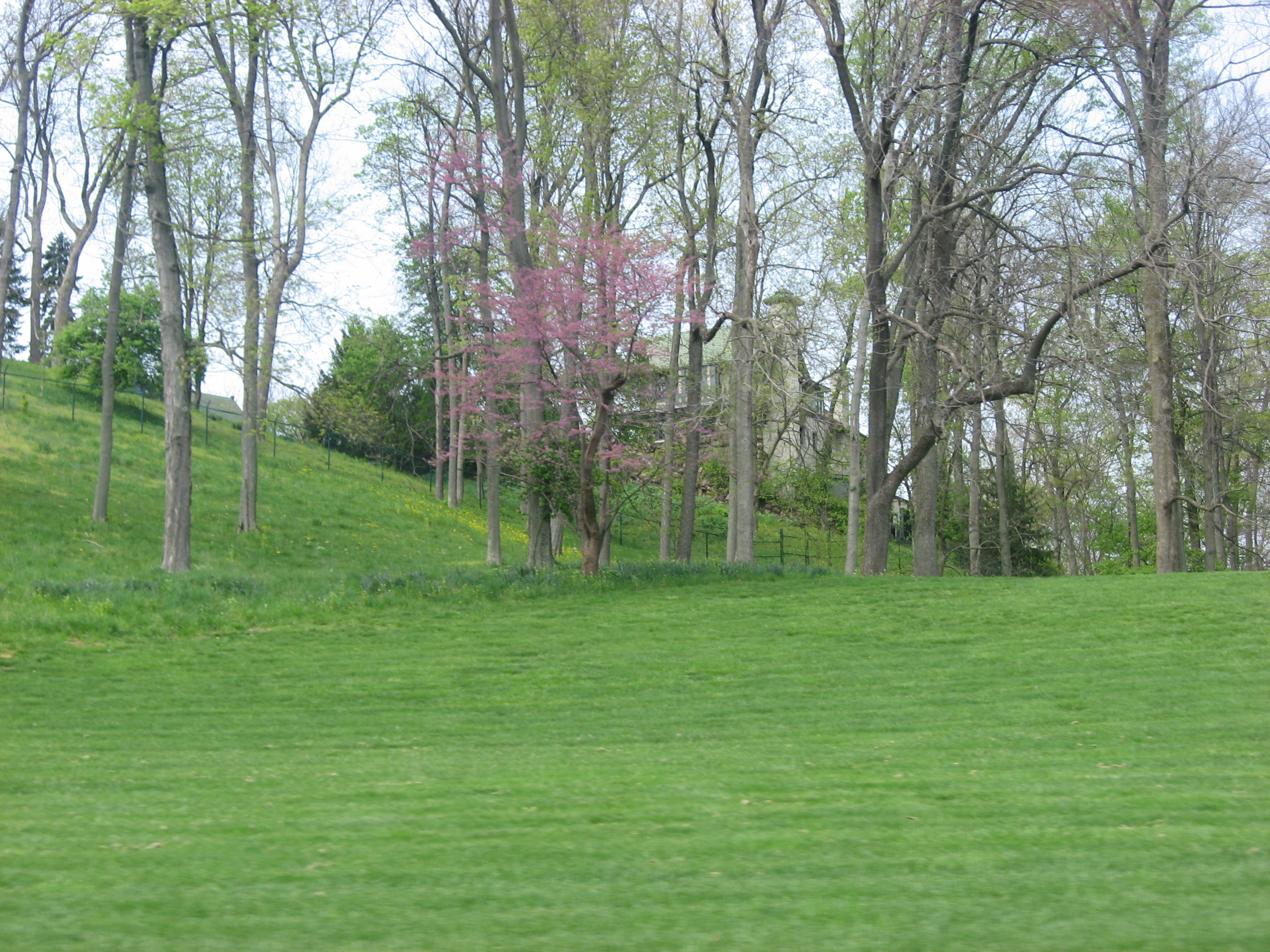
- Seen through a row of trees

- Location within Ohio Location within the United States
- Location: Ridgeleigh Rd., Kettering, Ohio
- Coordinates: 39°41′37″N 84°11′38″W
- Area: 11 acres (4.5 ha)
- Built: 1914
- Architect: Schenck & Williams
- Architectural style: Prairie School, Tudor Revival
- NRHP reference No.: 77001080

Significant dates
- Added to NRHP: December 22, 1977
- Designated NHL: December 22, 1977

The Charles F. Kettering House is a historic house on Ridgeleigh Road in Kettering, Ohio. Built in 1914, and reconstructed after a fire in 1995, it was the primary residence of inventor Charles F. Kettering, founder of Delco Electronics. The Tudor Revival house, also known as Ridgeleigh Terrace, was the first house in the United States with electric air conditioning using freon. The reconstructed house is now owned by Kettering Medical Center, which operates it as a conference center. It was designated a National Historic Landmark in 1977.

== Description and history ==
The Charles F. Kettering House is located on Kettering's west side, on a hill overlooking the grounds of both Kettering College and Kettering Medical Center. It is a large Tudor Revival structure, originally designed by the Dayton firm of Schenck & Williams and built in 1914. The original building was destroyed by fire in 1995 and was rebuilt with significant modifications from the original blueprints, primarily to the upper floors, which were redesigned to accommodate the building's function as a conference center.

Charles Kettering was a successful inventor, businessman, and philanthropist. His inventions of a reliable car engine ignition system, discovery of tetraethyl lead as a fuel additive to avoid engine knocking, and the development of freon, all contributed to the spread of the automobile in the United States. His philanthropy included founding of the Memorial Sloan Kettering Cancer Center.

== See also ==
- List of National Historic Landmarks in Ohio
