= Graphic Arts Building (Dayton, Ohio) =

- U.S. National Register of Historic Places
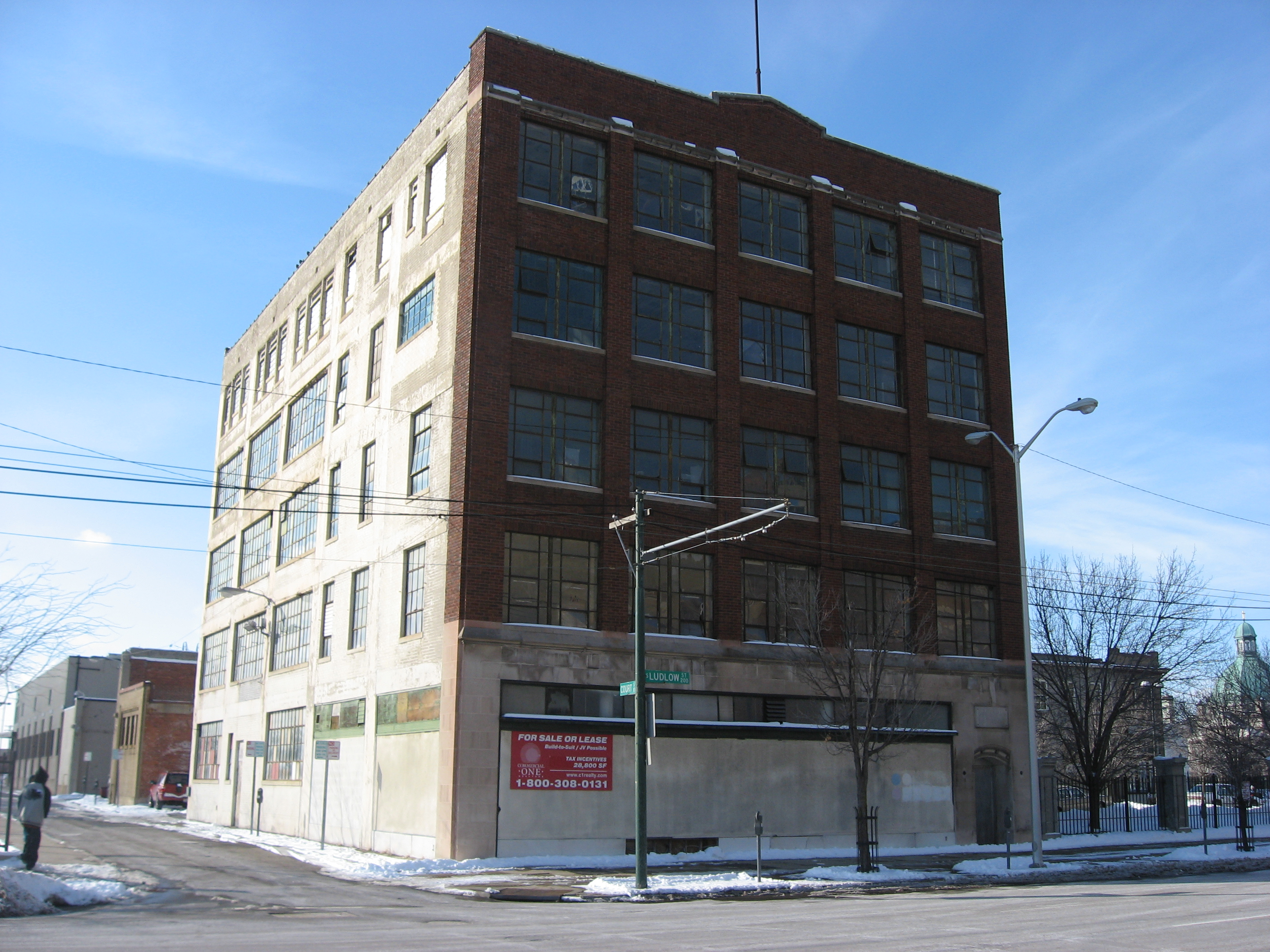
- Front and southern side of the building

- Location within Ohio Location within the United States
- Location: 221-223 S. Ludlow St., Dayton, Ohio
- Coordinates: 39°45′21″N 84°11′35″W
- Area: Less than 1 acre (0.40 ha)
- Built: 1924
- Architect: Harry I. Schenck; Harry J. Williams
- Architectural style: Early Commercial
- NRHP reference No.: 09000911
- Added to NRHP: November 12, 2009

The Graphic Arts Building is a historic commercial building on the edge of downtown Dayton, Ohio, United States. Built in the 1920s, it long housed the publishing house of a Protestant denomination, and it has been named a historic site.

== Christian Publishing Association ==
The Ohio Christian Book Association, established in 1843, was a publishing house associated with the denomination that later became known as the Christian Connexion, which in turn is one of the ancestors of the current United Church of Christ. A part of the Restoration Movement, the Connexion sponsored the publishing of the Herald of Gospel Liberty, which has been claimed as the world's oldest religious newspaper. Beginning in 1868, this periodical was published by the Connexion's publishing house, which by this time operated under the later name of "Christian Publishing Association". In the same year, the association bought a building in downtown Dayton, but ultimately found it unsatisfactory, and after more than ten years of operation from rented quarters, the association purchased another piece of land for $28,000. Construction began soon after the real estate was sold, and by the time that it was completed in June 1905, more than $100,000 had been spent on the building and its equipment. Twenty years later, the association arranged for the construction of the present property on Ludlow Street, which they only occupied for eleven years before moving in 1936.

== Architecture ==
Designed by the Dayton architectural firm of Schenck & Williams, the Graphic Arts Building is a composite structure: while the foundation is concrete and the roof asphalt, the walls mix brick, concrete, and glass, while peripheral elements are made of marble, limestone, and other kinds of stone. The extensive use of concrete was the result of structural demands: it was used in order to support the weight of the company's printing machinery and materials storage, as well as to render the five-story building fireproof. Although the sides are largely windowless, the front features five large multi-pane windows on each floor above ground level; they were placed in order to permit the entrance of substantial quantities of sunlight.

== Preservation ==
In August 2009, the Ohio State Historic Preservation Office nominated the Graphic Arts Building for addition to the National Register of Historic Places. At the time, the owner had announced his opposition to having the building named a historic site, but his objection was dropped within months, as the building was added to the Register in November 2009. It qualified for inclusion both because of its historically significant architecture and because of the place it had played in local history. A related distinction is shared by the Christian Publishing Association's previous building at Fifth and Ludlow; since renamed the Hamiel Building, it is an integral part of the Dayton Terra-Cotta Historic District, a historic district with National Register designation.
