= Landing Apartments =

- Dayton YMCA Building
- U.S. National Register of Historic Places
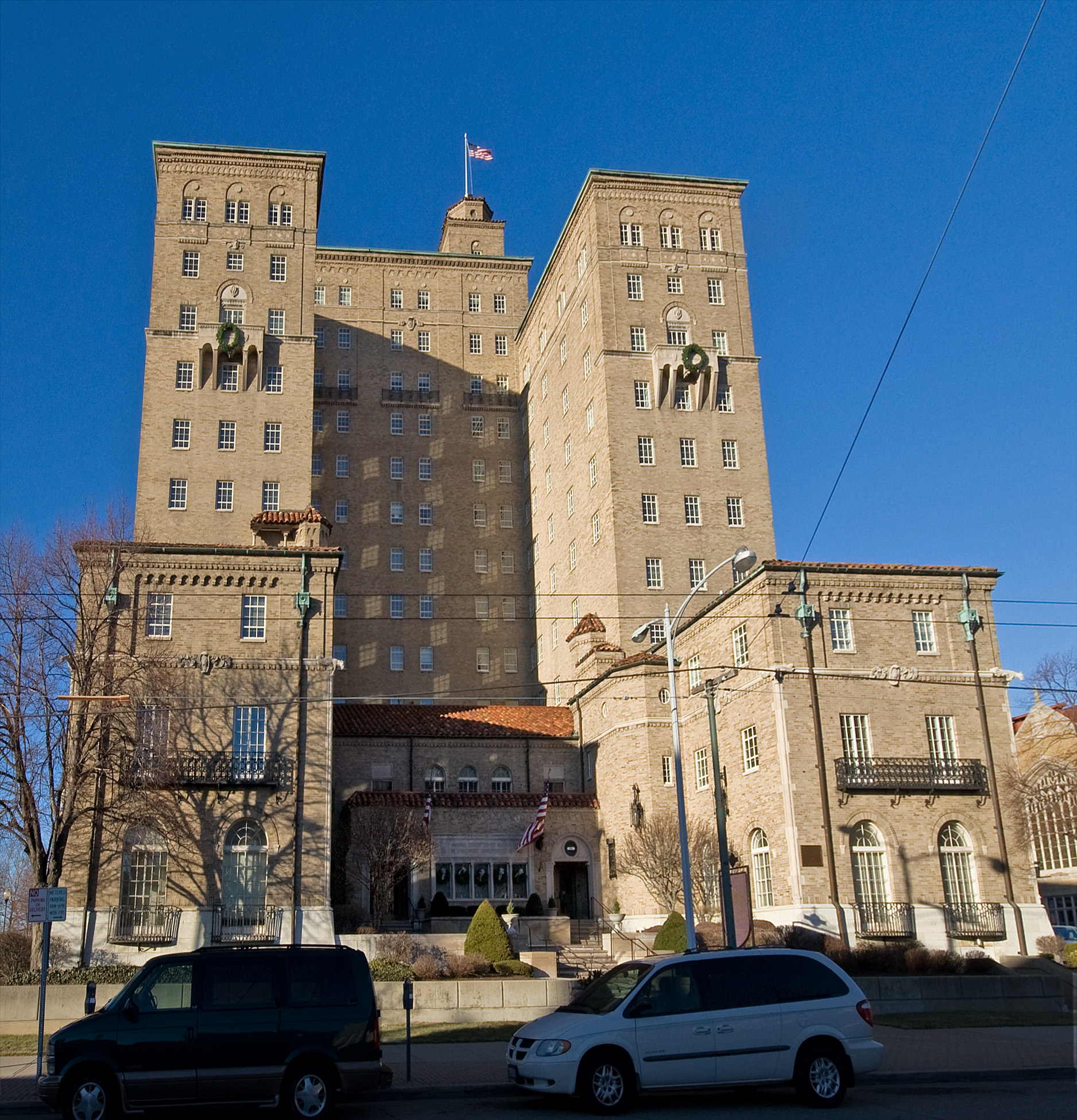
- Front of the building

- Location within Ohio Location within the United States
- Location: 117 W. Monument Ave., Dayton, Ohio
- Coordinates: 39°45′49″N 84°11′45″W
- Area: 1.2 acres (0.49 ha)
- Built: 1929
- Architect: Schenck & Williams; YMCA
- Architectural style: Late 19th And 20th Century Revivals, Italian Renaissance
- NRHP reference No.: 88001299
- Added to NRHP: August 25, 1988

The Landing Apartments (formerly named Dayton YMCA) is a historic structure located at 117 West Monument Street in Dayton, Ohio. It was designed by Schenck & Williams and added to the National Register of Historic Places on August 25, 1988.

== Historic uses ==
- Domestic
- Education
- Recreation And Culture
- Social

== See also ==
- National Register of Historic Places listings in Dayton, Ohio
