= Liberty Tower (Dayton) =

- Mutual Home & Savings Association Building
- U.S. National Register of Historic Places
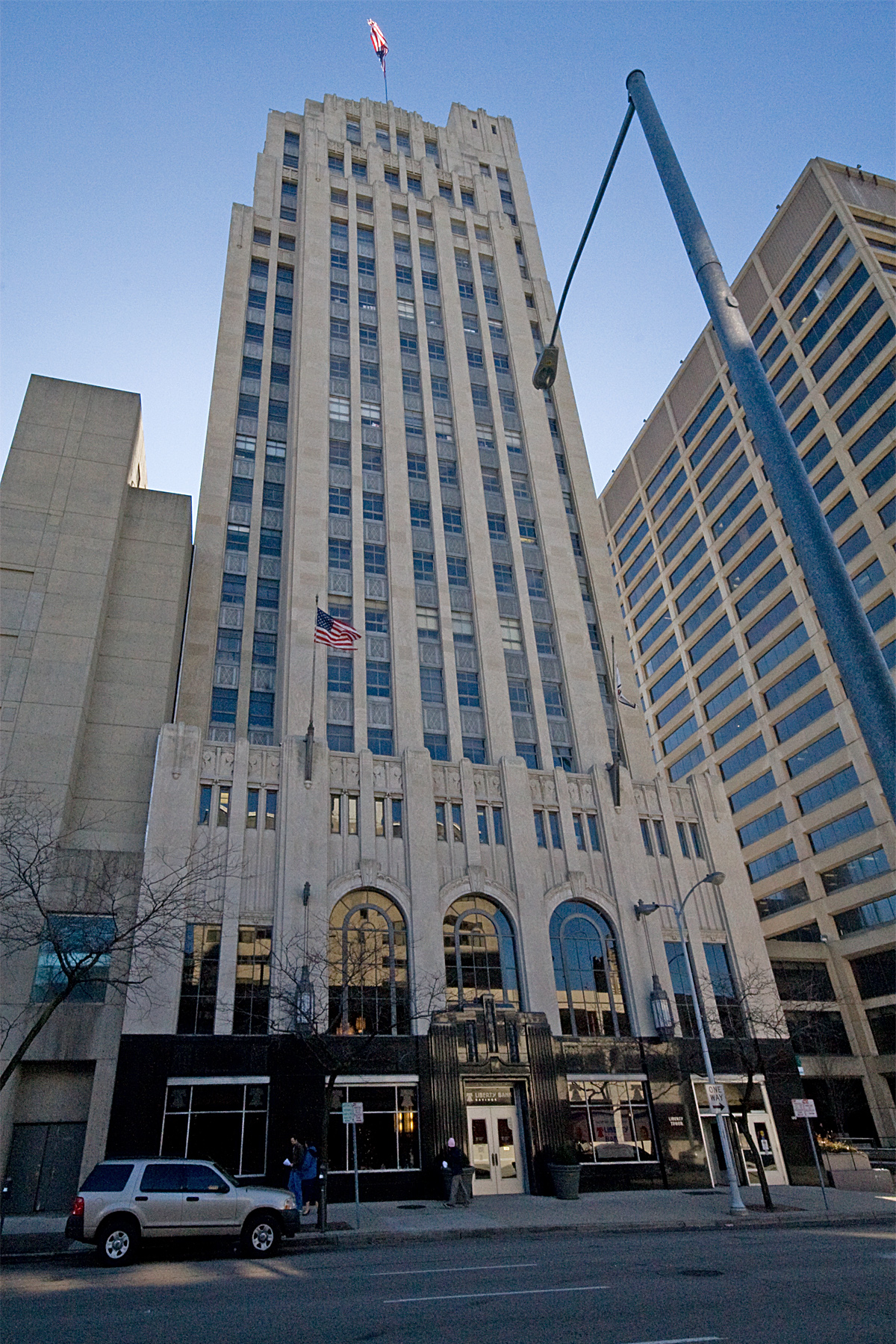
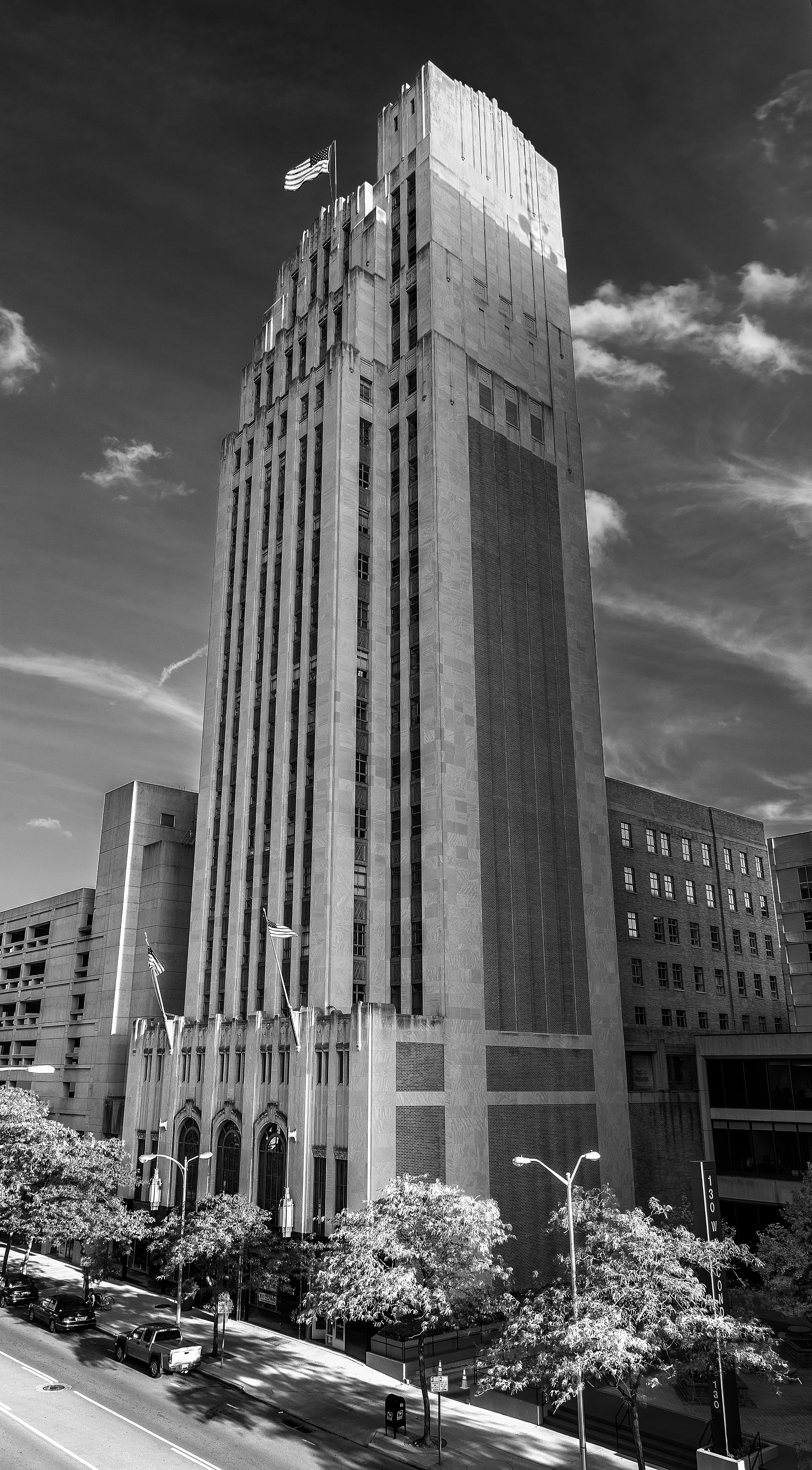
- Front of the building Taken from parking garage across the street on September 20, 2014.

- Location within Ohio Location within the United States
- Location: 120 W. 2nd St., Dayton, Ohio
- Coordinates: 39°45′37″N 84°11′43″W
- Area: 1 acre (0.40 ha)
- Built: 1931
- Architect: Schenck & Williams
- Architectural style: Modern Movement
- NRHP reference No.: 82001480
- Added to NRHP: December 16, 1982

The Liberty Tower is a high-rise office building in Dayton, Ohio, United States. The 295 feet (90 m) tower was designed by the Dayton architectural firm of Schenck & Williams. The tower is named Liberty Tower after Liberty Savings Bank. Currently, the building hosts a branch of First Financial Bank, this company having bought out a number of Liberty Savings Bank locations.

== History ==
Liberty Tower, previously known as Mutual Home Savings Association Building, was the tallest building in Dayton from 1931 to 1969. At one point it was the property of the owners of the Indianapolis Motor Speedway — the Hulman Family of Terre Haute, Indiana. In 1982 Liberty Tower became listed on the National Register of Historic Places.

== See also ==
- List of tallest buildings in Dayton, Ohio
- National Register of Historic Places listings in Dayton, Ohio
