= Hawthorn Hill =

Historic house in Ohio, United States

- U.S. National Register of Historic Places
- U.S. National Historic Landmark
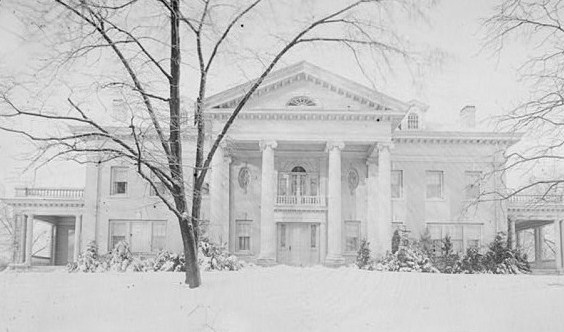
- Hawthorn Hill in the winter

- Location within Ohio Location within the United States
- Location: 901 Harman Avenue, Oakwood, Ohio
- Coordinates: 39°43′20″N 84°10′34″W
- Built: 1914
- Architect: Schenck & Williams, Wilbur and Orville Wright
- Architectural style: Classical Revival
- NRHP reference No.: 74001585
- Added to NRHP: October 18, 1974

Hawthorn Hill is the house that served as the post-1914 home of Orville, Milton and Katharine Wright. Located in Oakwood, Ohio, Wilbur and Orville Wright intended for it to be their joint home, but Wilbur died in 1912, before the home's 1914 completion. The brothers hired the prominent Dayton architectural firm of Schenck and Williams to realize their plans. Orville and his father Milton and sister Katharine occupied the home in 1914.

Though the property now comprises three acres (1.2 ha), the mansion originally sat on 17 acres (69,000 m^{2}). The Wrights named the property after the hawthorn trees found on the property. There are at least 150 hawthorn trees on the site.

Orville Wright designed some of the mechanical features of the house such as the water storage tank used to collect and recycle rainwater, and the central vacuum system; these features reflect his creative genius. For 34 years, this house was the gathering place for the greats and near-greats in the history of American aviation.

The home was owned by the NCR Corporation after Orville's death until August 18, 2006, when the company donated the historic home to the Wright Family Foundation in honor of Orville's 135th birthday and National Aviation Day. NCR used it as a guesthouse for corporate VIPs and for corporate functions. On occasion they opened the home to the general public.

In September 2007, Dayton History, in cooperation with the Wright Family Foundation, began offering scheduled public tours of Hawthorn Hill.

NCR extensively redecorated the mansion's interior after Orville's death. Only Orville's study approximates its pre-1948 appearance. However, Edward A. Deeds, then-chairman of the National Cash Register Company, sent a photographer to the home immediately following Orville's death to visually record the interior of the house at that time.

The U.S. Secretary of the Interior designated Hawthorn Hill a National Historic Landmark in 1991 and added it to the U.S. World Heritage Tentative List in January 2008 as a part of the Dayton Aviation Sites listing. It is a component of the National Aviation Heritage Area.

== Gallery ==
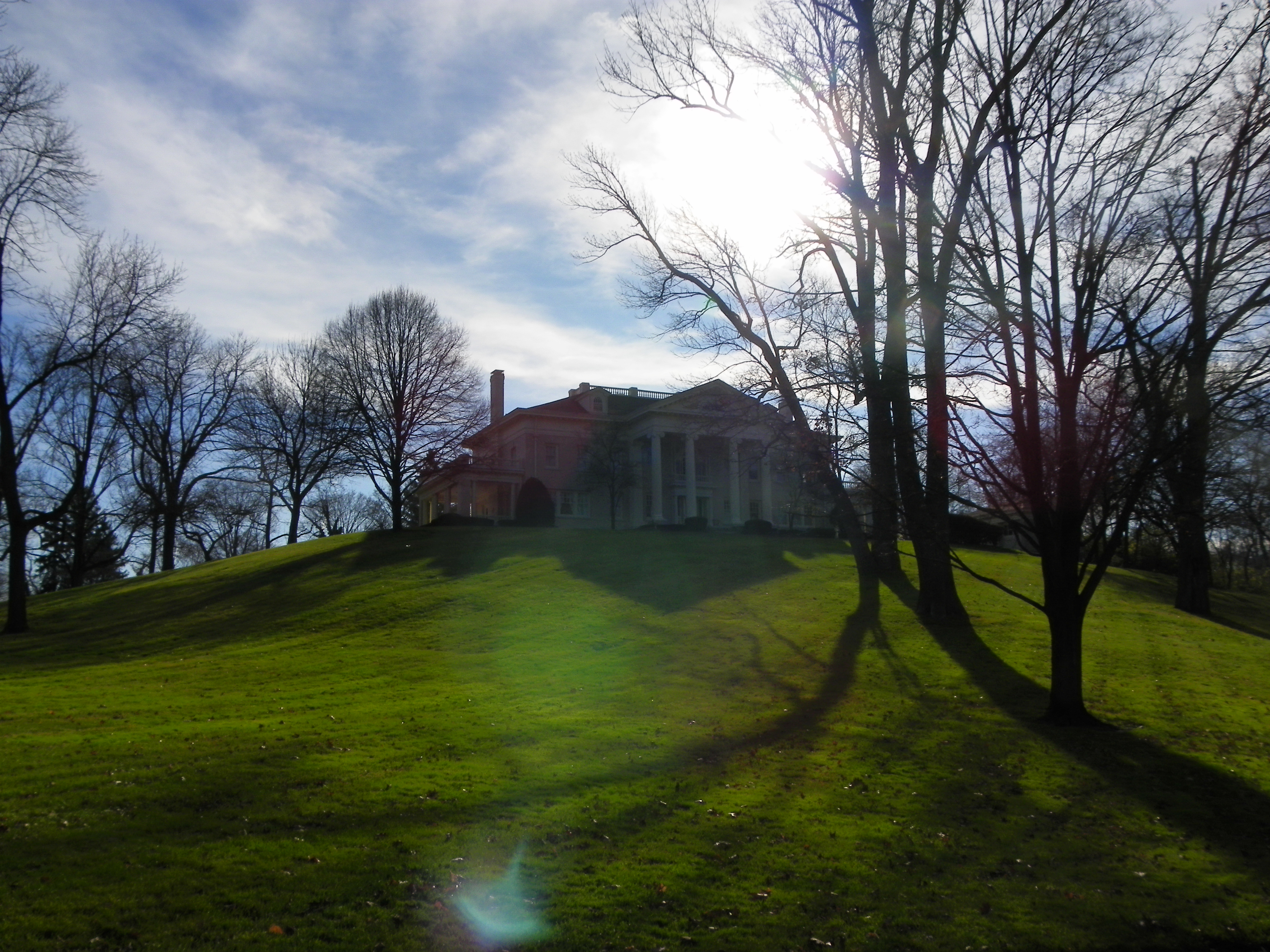

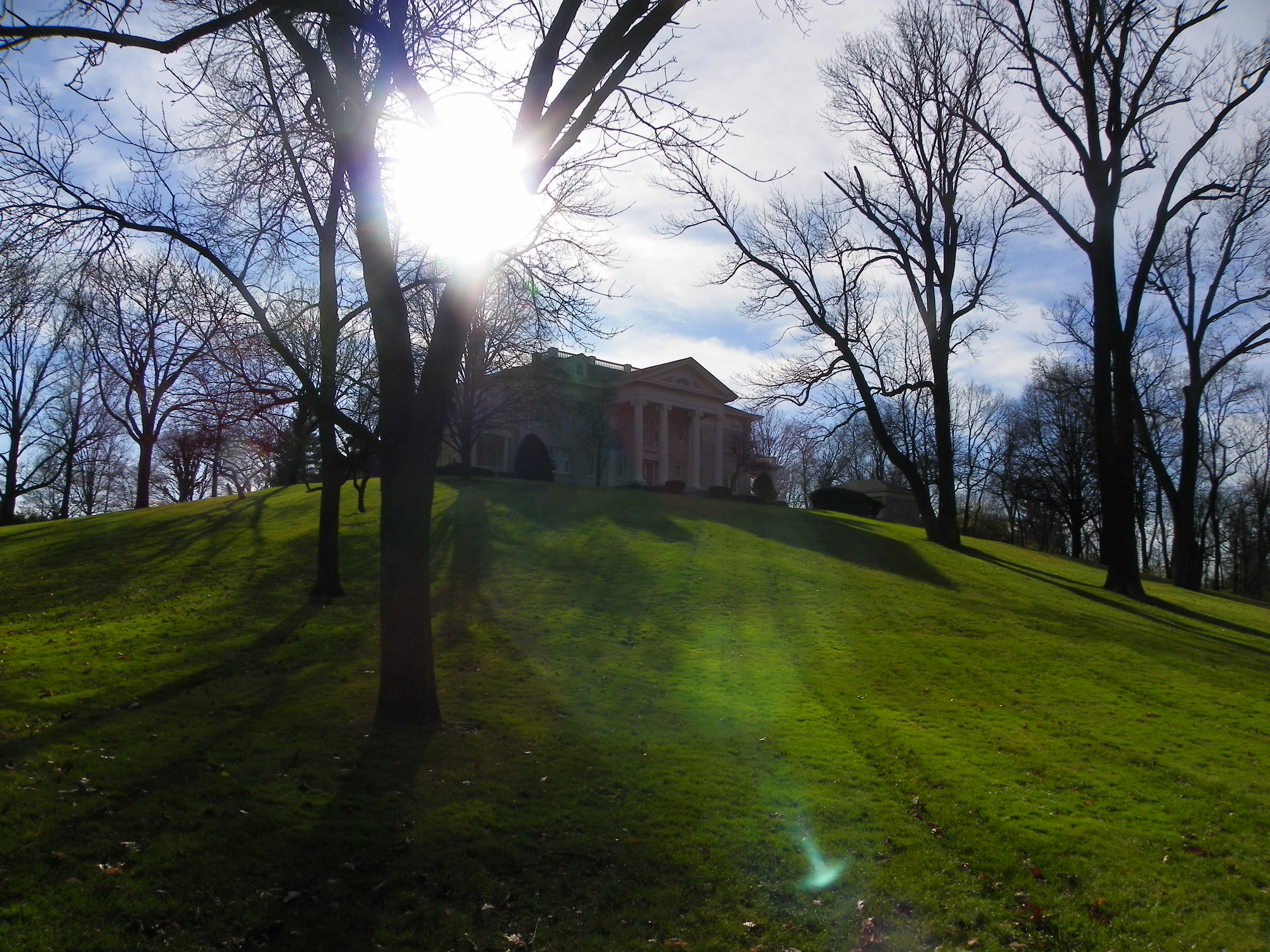

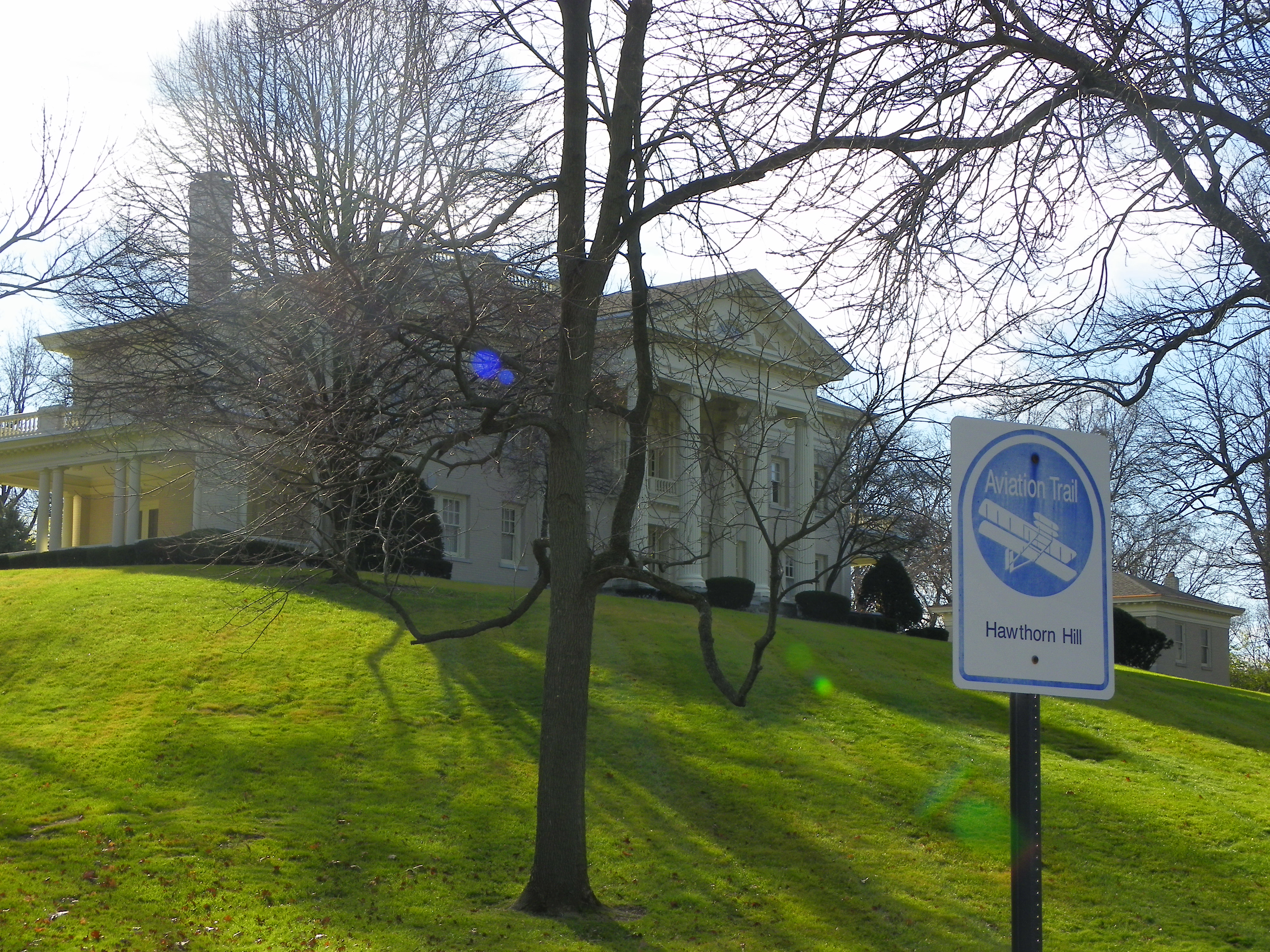

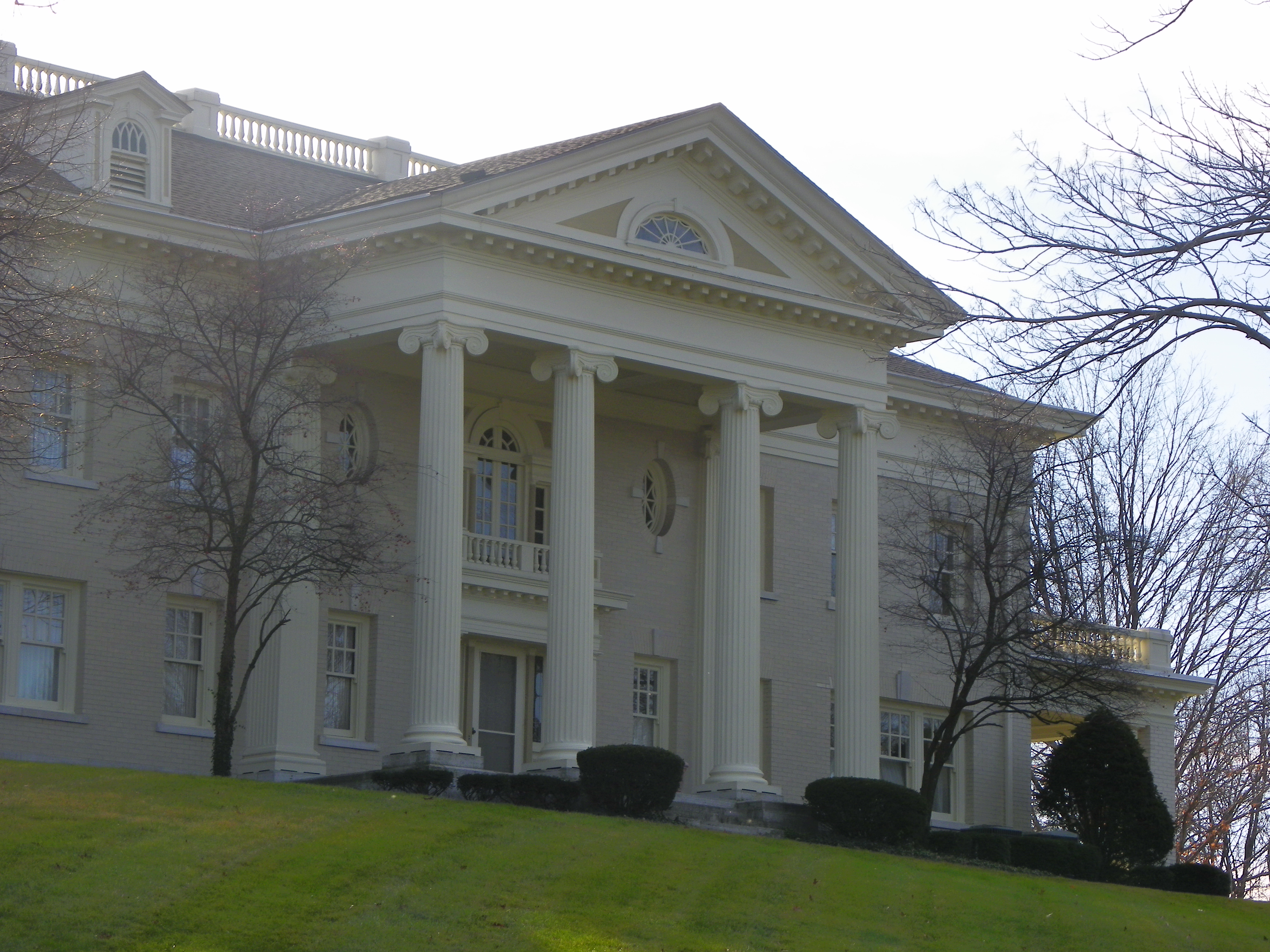

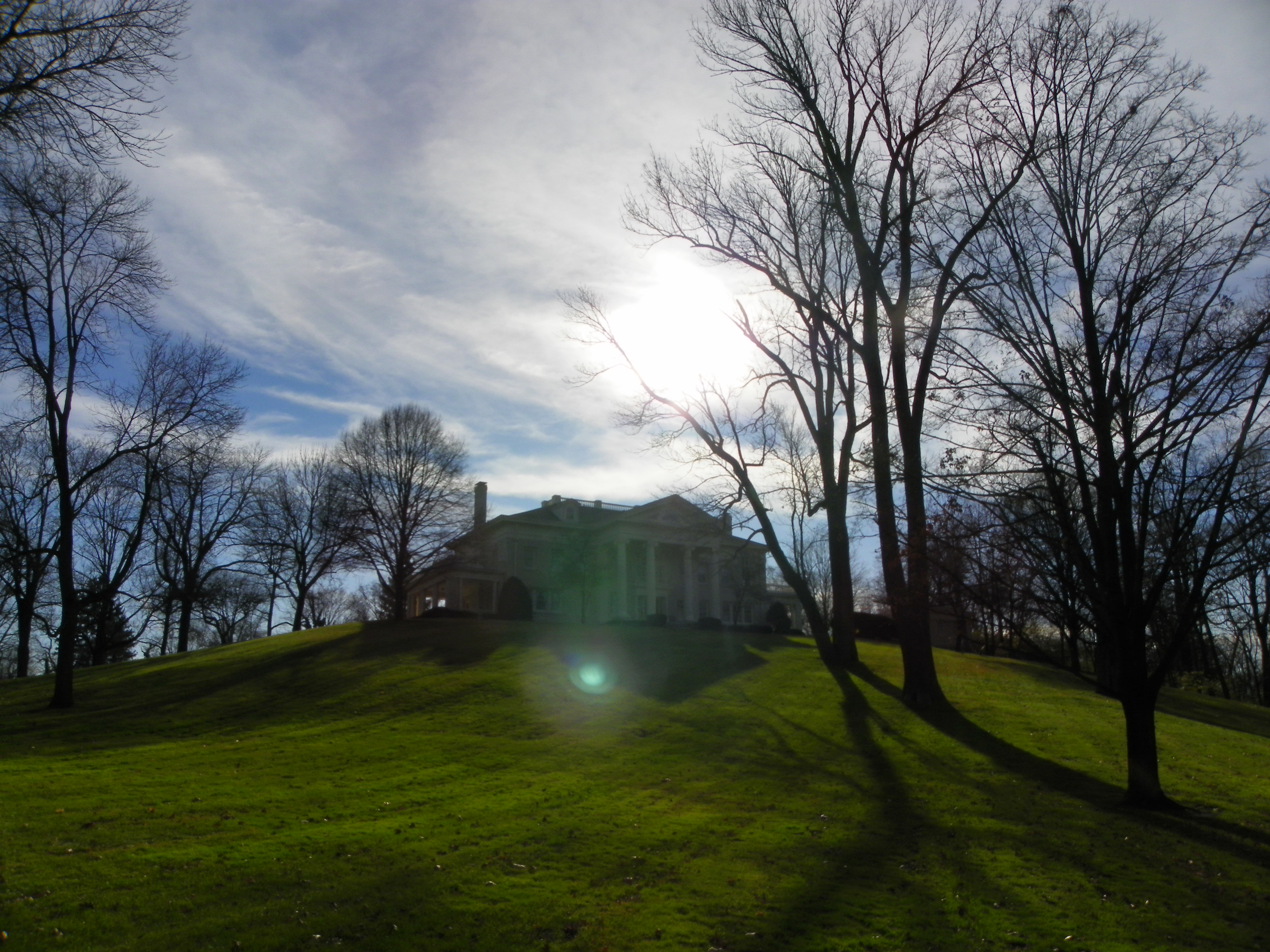

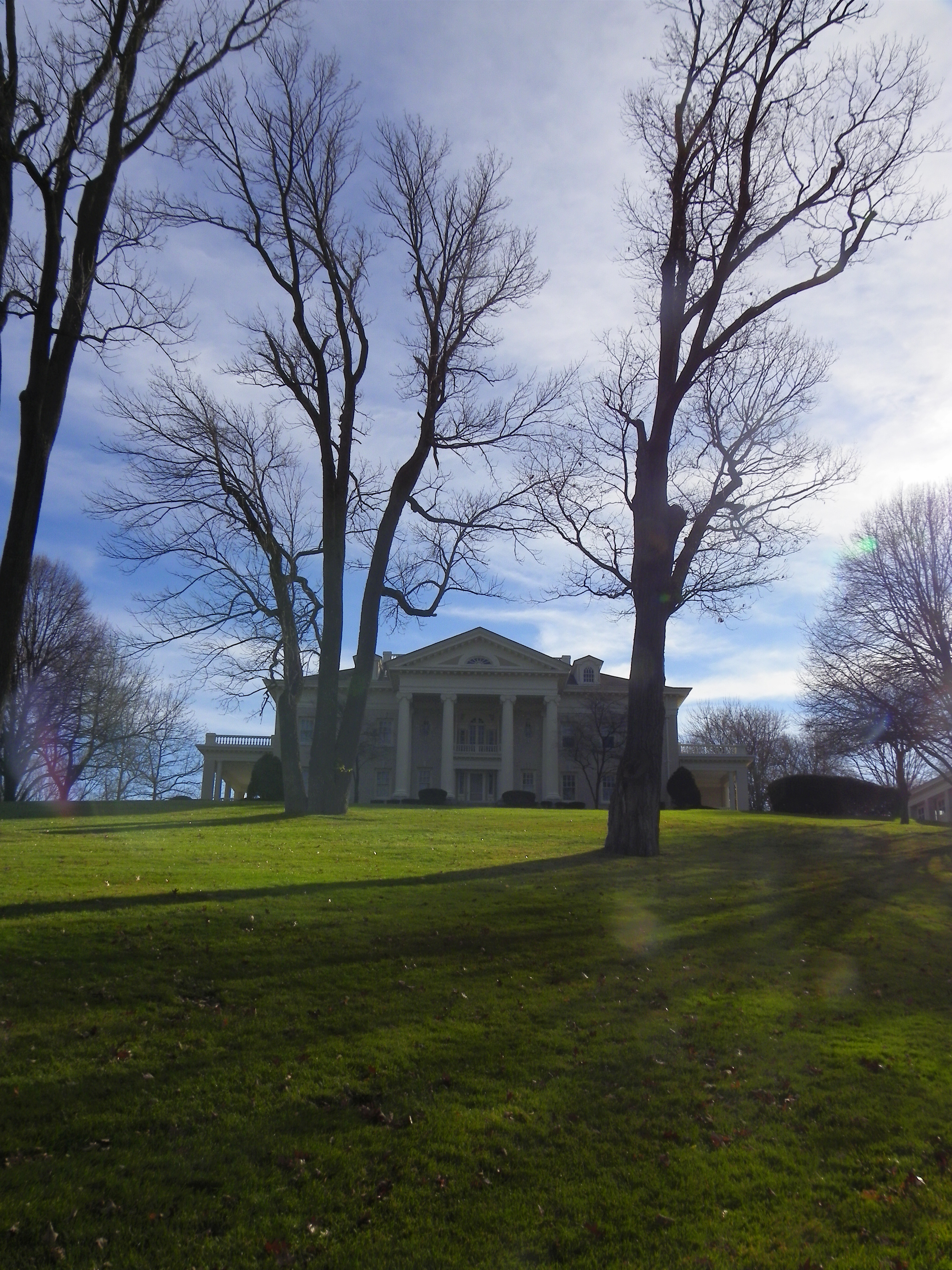

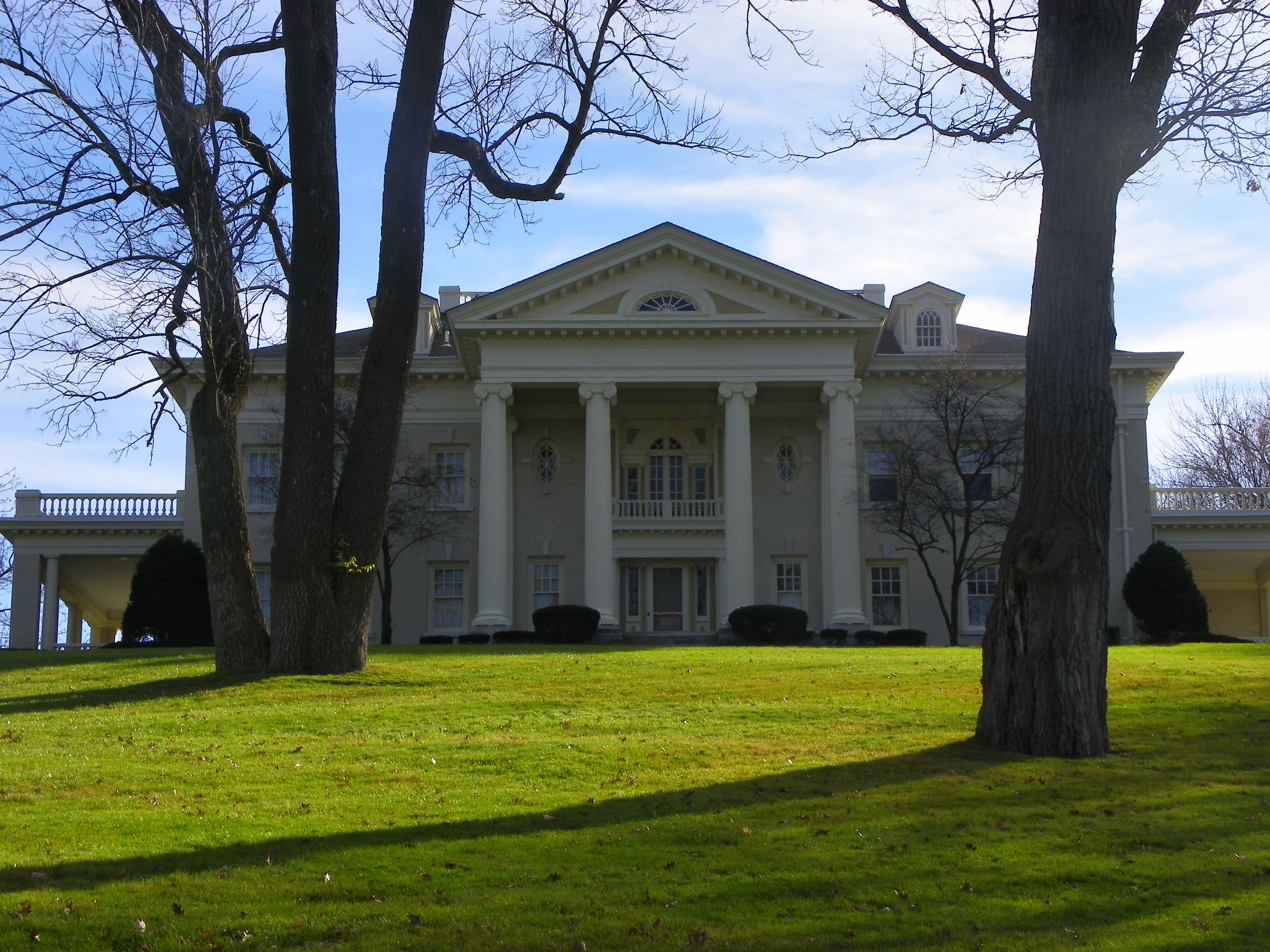

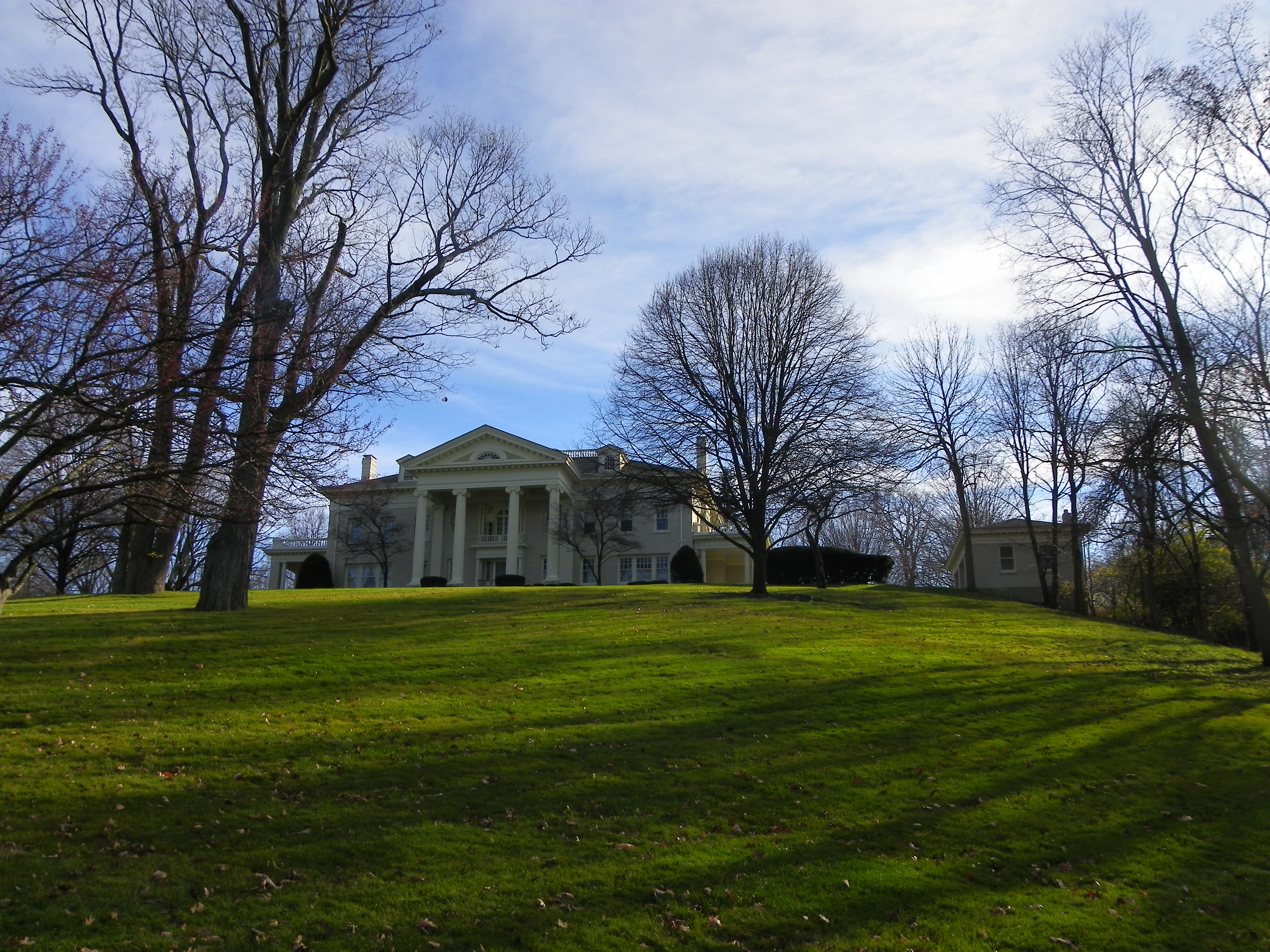
