= Engineers Club of Dayton =

- U.S. National Register of Historic Places
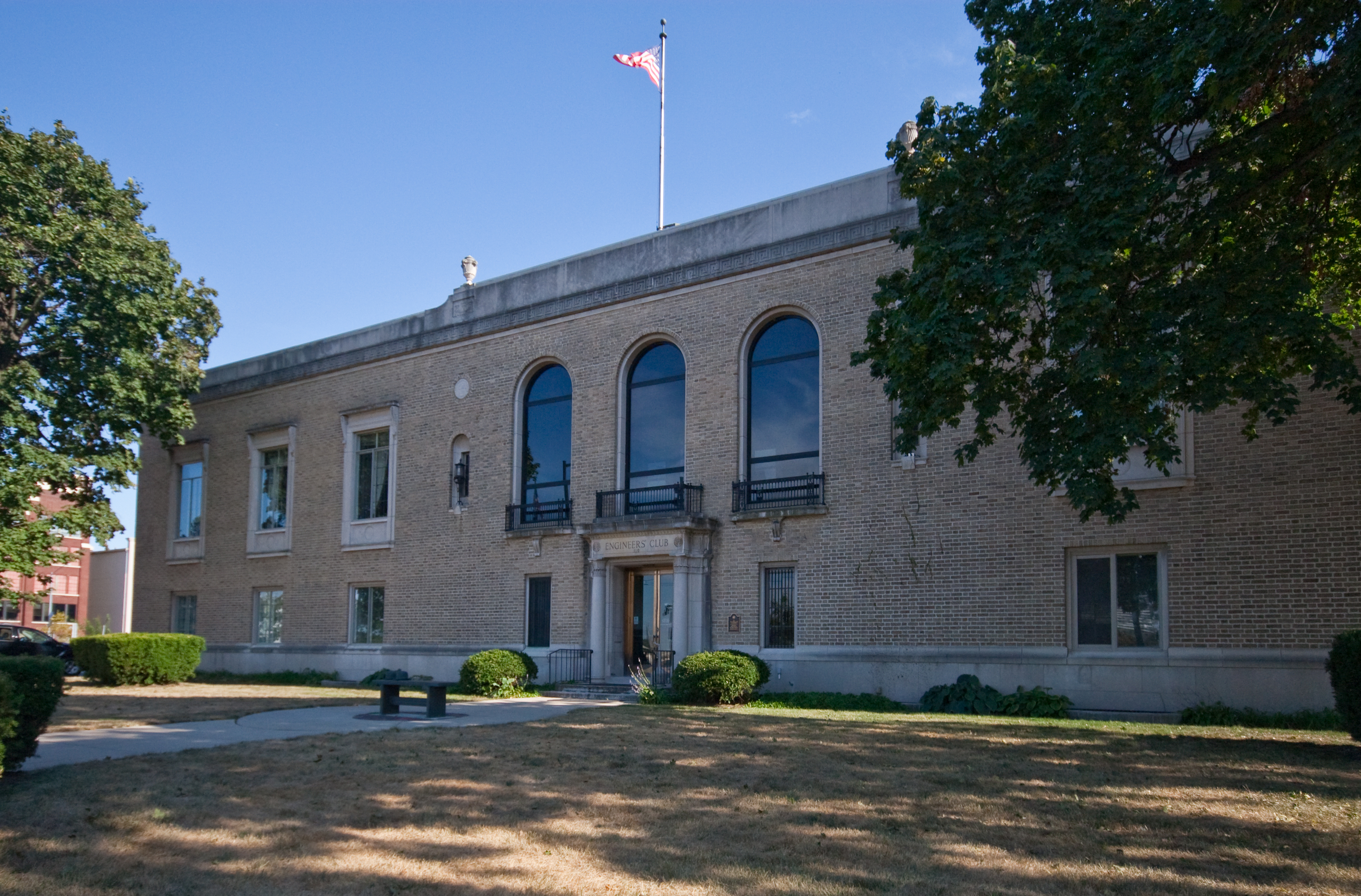
- Engineers Club of Dayton

- Location within Ohio Location within the United States
- Location: 110 E. Monument Ave., Dayton, Ohio
- Coordinates: 39°45′49″N 84°11′27″W
- Area: less than one acre
- Architect: Schenck & Williams
- Architectural style: Colonial Revival
- NRHP reference No.: 07001091
- Added to NRHP: October 17, 2007

The Engineers Club of Dayton was founded by Colonel Edward A. Deeds and Charles F. Kettering in Dayton, Ohio in 1914. The club's building is listed on the National Register of Historic Places and the history of the club involves notable Daytonians and historical figures such as Orville Wright.

== Establishment ==
Members cited the status of Dayton as one of the leading industrial cities in the country in support of their formation of the club. The charter members of the Engineers Club were Edward A. Deeds, Charles F. Kettering, Frank Morrison Tait, H.B. Canby, Arthur E. Morgan, H.M. Williams, H.J. Williams, H.G. Dorsey, H.G. Kittredge, D.A. Kohr, Harry I. Schenck, J.H. Hunt, O.H. Hutchings, Oscar, Kressler, and F.O. Clements. On April 15, 1914, the charter members signed the articles of incorporation of the Engineers Club of Dayton. Deeds was elected the club's first president (1914–1915).

Through a connection of Kettering, the club was originally permitted to meet at a property owned by Delco Electronics located on the corner of Second and Madison streets in Dayton. As membership grew, the need for a new, permanent location became evident and a building committee, funded by Deeds and Kettering, planned the construction of the present location of the club on Monument Avenue.

On February 2, 1918, the club's new home, designed by the Dayton firm of Schenck & Williams, was dedicated in front of more than 300 members and guests. Commemorating the occasion, Orville Wright gave a rare public speech. He emphasized the responsibility of the membership, both present and future. Among the distinguished guests present at the event were Governor James M. Cox, Major J.G. Vincent and William B. Mayo.

The first woman full member of the club was M. Elsa Gardner.

On October 17, 2007, the Engineers Club of Dayton was added to the National Register of Historic Places.

== Membership and Organizational Information ==
According to the articles of incorporation, the mission of the Engineers Club is to "foster the advancement of business, education, engineering and science, and to promote the professional development of its members."

The Engineers Club is a private, non-profit professional-association, overseen by a Board of Governors and operated by a Club Manager and staff. The Engineers Club Foundation is a 501(c)(3) organization whose mission is to support education in engineering and business professions and the restoration and preservation of the historic Engineers Club of Dayton building. Donations to the Foundation are tax deductible.

The Engineers Club of Dayton is open to new members and offers "individual memberships, including special memberships for students and non-residents (outside the Miami Valley), as well as corporate and group memberships."

== Current operations ==
The membership of the Engineers Club is currently primarily made up of professionals and academics throughout the Dayton area. The club holds lectures and other similar professional events throughout the year. In addition to such academic activities, the club frequently hosts social events for its members.

Financing for the club's operations comes through its endowed foundation, the Engineers Club Foundation, membership fees and food sales from the dining room, located within the Engineers Club building. Members are currently required to spend a certain amount on dining and social activities offered by the club within any given calendar year.

In addition to the sources of income already discussed, the Engineers Club earns operating revenue through renting various space within the club's historic facility for banquet services. From the club's website, the types of events for which the club is well suited include wedding receptions, showers, anniversaries, birthdays, tea parties, reunions, seminars, conferences, business meetings, awards dinners, presentations and other gatherings for 15-350 guests.
