= Edward Andrew Deeds =

American engineer and industrialist (1874–1960)

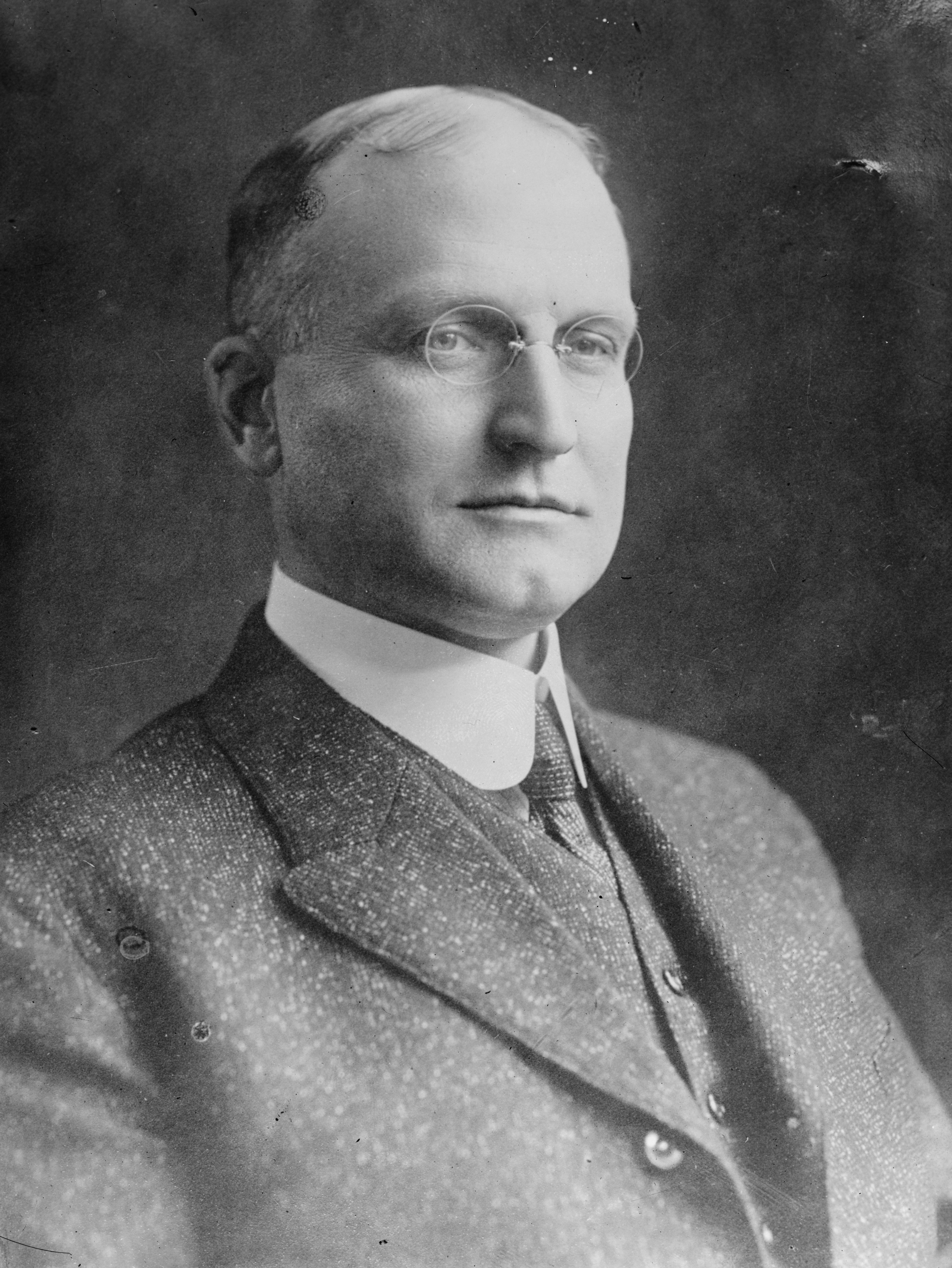
- Deeds in 1917
- Born: March 12, 1874; Granville, Ohio, US
- Died: July 1, 1960 (aged 86); Kettering, Ohio, US
- Resting place: Woodland Cemetery, Dayton, Ohio, US
- Education: Denison University; Cornell University
- Occupations: Engineer; inventor; industrialist
- Spouse: Edith M. Walton (m. 1900)

Edward Andrew Deeds (March 12, 1874 – July 1, 1960) was an American engineer, inventor and industrialist prominent in the Dayton, Ohio, area. He was the president of the National Cash Register Company and, together with Charles F. Kettering, founded Dayton Engineering Laboratories Company (Delco), an early innovator in automotive technology. Deeds partnered with Orville Wright in an early airplane manufacturing venture and led the military aircraft production effort in World War I.

== Early years ==
Edward Deeds was born in 1874 on a farm southwest of Granville, Ohio to Charles and Susan Deeds. Deeds graduated in 1897 from Denison University where he was valedictorian and a member of Beta Theta Pi. He studied electrical engineering at Cornell University, but was unable to complete his graduate studies due to insufficient funds. He married Edith M. Walton (1870–1949).

== Career ==
Relocating to Dayton, Ohio, he began working as an electrical engineer and draftsman for the Thresher Company, designing and installing electric motors. After eighteen months, he was named superintendent and chief engineer of the firm. The National Cash Register Company was headquartered in the same building as the Thresher Company and, in 1899, Frederick Patterson invited Deeds to join "the Cash" to strengthen its team. There he oversaw the electrification of the NCR factories and built its first electric generating station. He left NCR to build the Shredded Wheat factory, known as the Palace of Light, for Henry Perky at Niagara Falls. The factory was white-tiled, air-conditioned, well-lit, and equipped with showers, lunchrooms, and auditoriums for the employees and clearly was influenced by Deeds' exposure to the ideas of John H. Patterson at NCR. The Palace of Light preceded the Pure Food and Drug Act's requirements for a clean work environment for food production by 6 years. Deeds was a director of Perky's National Food Company.

In 1903 he returned to NCR as chief of development and construction. Deeds constructed some prototype electric motors to demonstrate that they could be used to power cash registers. He hired Charles F. Kettering to prove the concept and three years later, Kettering had a working production model which revolutionized the register business and established National Cash Register as the dominant manufacturer worldwide for decades. Deeds oversaw the establishment of NCR factories in England, France, Italy, Germany and Canada. In February 1913, Deeds was convicted of violations of the Sherman Antitrust Act along with John H. Patterson, Thomas J. Watson and 25 other NCR executives and managers. He was sentenced to one year, but the sentence was never served as the convictions were successfully appealed.

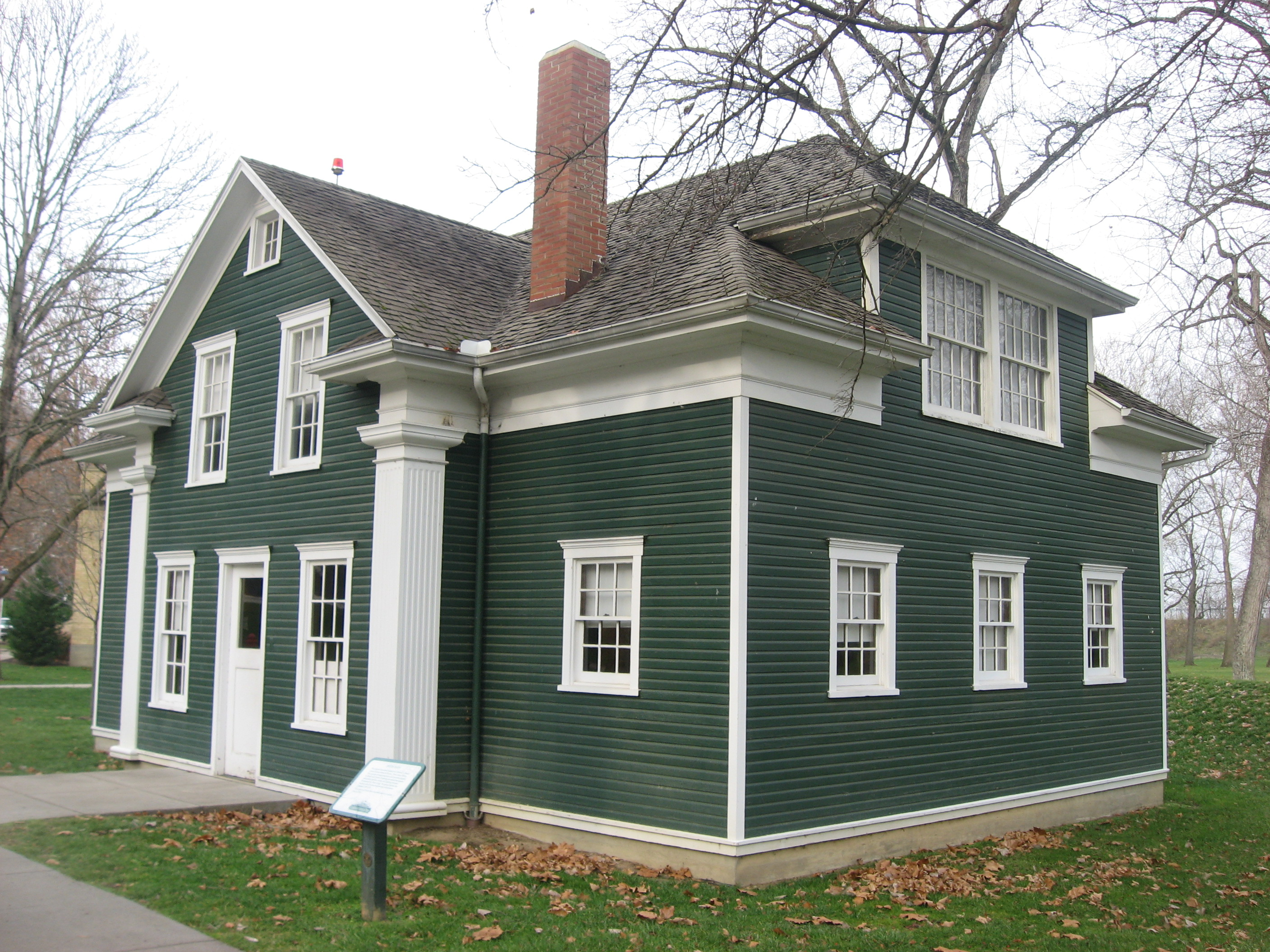
A replica of the Deeds' barn at Carillon Historical Park, Dayton, Ohio.

Kettering and Deeds had a lifelong professional relationship and friendship. Deeds provided space in one of his barns for Kettering to work on an electric starter for automobiles. (Photo is of a reproduction of Deeds barn on display at Carillon Historical Park in Dayton, Ohio. The original Barn was moved to Carillon Historical Park from Moraine Farm in 2009 and is housed in The Heritage Center, an exhibition wing of the main building.) In 1909, Henry Leland of the Cadillac Company ordered 5,000 ignition sets and Deeds and Kettering formed the Dayton Engineering Laboratories company, Delco. Delco was eventually sold to United Motors Company which was later acquired by General Motors. Deeds was a member of the board of United Motors.

The Delco brand name was associated with original production units of the company such as Delco Light, Delco Products, Delco Moraine and others, and was also adopted into other General Motors units such as Delco-Remy and others. The research laboratories of Delco became the foundation for the General Motors Research Corporation. Deeds left NCR in 1915 to devote full attention to Delco.

Deeds contributed to the rebuilding of Dayton and formation of the Miami Conservancy District after the Great Dayton Flood of 1913. In 1914, Deeds and Kettering founded the Engineers Club of Dayton. He founded the Dayton-Wright Airplane Company with Orville Wright, H. E. Talbott, and Kettering. Deeds was appointed Chief of Aircraft Production in Washington D.C. The Delco plant in Moraine, Ohio was expanded to manufacture the DeHavilland DH.4 bomber, the only American-built airplane to see action in World War I. More than 3,000 were built in Moraine. The company produced the Liberty engine. In 1917, he joined the United States Army with the rank of colonel, taking the responsibility for military aircraft procurement at McCook Field, precursor to Wright-Patterson Air Force Base.

But, despite the expenditure of $1,000,000,000, no US-built military aircraft reached the front in World War I, and President Wilson appointed Charles Evans Hughes to investigate. Hughes found evidence of "...gross self-interest and improper practice..." and recommended that Colonel Deeds be court-martialed under sections 95 and 96 of the articles of war, a recommendation endorsed by the Attorney General. A House committee chaired by Representative William J. Graham of Illinois similarly found "that Deeds began his activities by centering aircraft operations at Dayton, Ohio; that he gave large contracts to his business associates..." and that he had pushed for the use of his Delco ignition system in the Liberty engine even though magnetos had been used on all airplane engines. When Secretary of War Baker ordered the case reopened, a special military board exonerated Deeds.

Colonel Deeds was a founder member of the Engineers Club of Dayton in 1914. In 1918 he was also one of the founding members of the Dayton Astronomical Society (DAS), the first formally organized group of amateur astronomers in the Dayton area. After the war, Deeds returned to Delco. In 1922, Deeds was instrumental in reorganizing over 100 Cuban sugar companies into the General Sugar Company, from which he retired as chairman in 1946. During the Depression in 1931, Deeds returned to NCR to restore shareholder confidence, serving as its president until 1940 and honorary chairman until his retirement in 1957.

Deeds, Kettering, and newspaper magnate and politician James M. Cox all built magnificent homes near each other south of Dayton, Ohio in what later became Kettering, Ohio. Deeds' home, today owned by the Kettering Health Network, was called Moraine Farm and was the first home in the United States to have a private airstrip. The home also includes an observatory that houses a 7" refractor telescope.

== Memorials ==
The Art moderne-style Carillon tower in Carillon Historical Park, referred to as The Deeds Carillon, was built in 1942, funded by his wife Edith Walton Deeds and was designed to commemorate the Deeds family. When the tower was built, each of 23 bells was inscribed with the name of a family member, with the "silent" bells bearing the names of deceased family members and ringing bells cast with the names of family members then living. Today, with 57 bells, the carillon is Ohio's largest. The historical elements of the park were the brainchild of Deeds himself. Also, the primary athletic field at Denison University, Deeds Field, was named in his honor.

Deeds died at his home, Moraine Farm, in 1960.
