= Olive Kettering Library =

Coordinates: 39°47′55″N 83°53′19″W

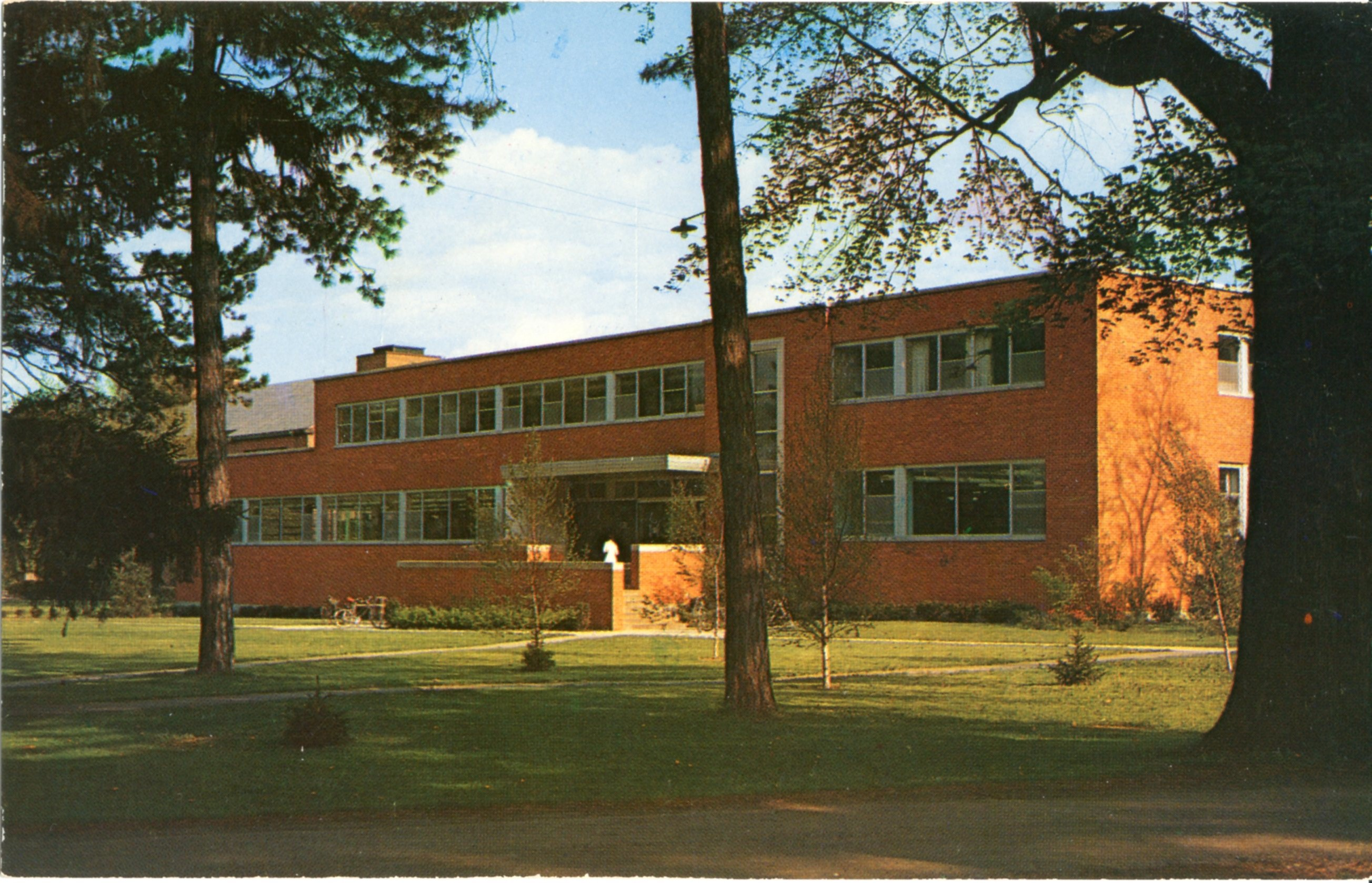
- Location: Yellow Springs, Ohio, United States
- Type: Academic library
- Established: 1954

Access and use
- Population served: Antioch College, residents of Yellow Springs

Other information
- Director: Kevin Mulhall
- Employees: 4
- Website: Olive Kettering Library at Antioch College

The Olive Kettering Library (OKL) is the library of Antioch College in Yellow Springs, Ohio. The library was named after Olive Kettering, the wife of Antioch College trustee Charles Franklin Kettering.

== History ==
The original college library was housed in Antioch Hall, a/k/a Main Building. From 1925 to 1954, Antioch College was served by the Horace Mann Library, which was located at Weston Hall. In 1953, Charles Kettering, a benefactor of Antioch College, gave $750,000 for a new building to accommodate the college's expanding library collection. The building was dedicated on October 5, 1955, by Kettering and David Riesman.

In 1967, the library became a founding member of the Ohio College Library Center, one of the first cooperative, computerized library networks. By the 1990s, the Olive Kettering Library had the campus' first community computer lab.

After Antioch College was closed in 2008, the library continued to operate under the college's umbrella organization, Antioch University. After reopening in 2011, Antioch College re-assumed control. As of 2023, the library had three full-time employees and a small number of part-time student workers.

== Collections and features ==
The Olive Kettering Library houses more than 325,000 volumes, 900 periodicals, and 4,000 phonograph records. The library is also home to Antiochiana, Antioch College's archive. Among the items kept in the archive are the papers of Antioch Presidents Horace Mann and Arthur Morgan. The library is also home to The Antioch Review, one of the oldest continuously published literary magazines in the United States prior to it being put on hiatus by the college in 2020.

The Olive Kettering Library has been a member of OhioLINK since 1999. The library is also a member of the Ohio Private Academic Libraries (OPAL) and the Library Council of the Strategic Ohio Council for Higher Education (SOCHE).
