= Fire Station No. 16 =

Fire Station No. 16, and variations such as Engine House No. 16, may refer to:

- Fire Station No. 16 (Birmingham, Alabama)
- Engine Company 16 Fire Station, Hartford, Connecticut
- Engine House No. 16 (Columbus, Ohio)
- Dayton Fire Department Station No. 16, Dayton, Ohio
- Dallas Fire Station No. 16, Dallas, Texas
- Engine Company 16-Truck Company 3, Washington, D.C.

== See also ==
- List of fire stations
