= St. Mary's Catholic Church (Dayton, Ohio) =

Historic church in Ohio, United States

- St. Mary Roman Catholic Church
- U.S. National Register of Historic Places
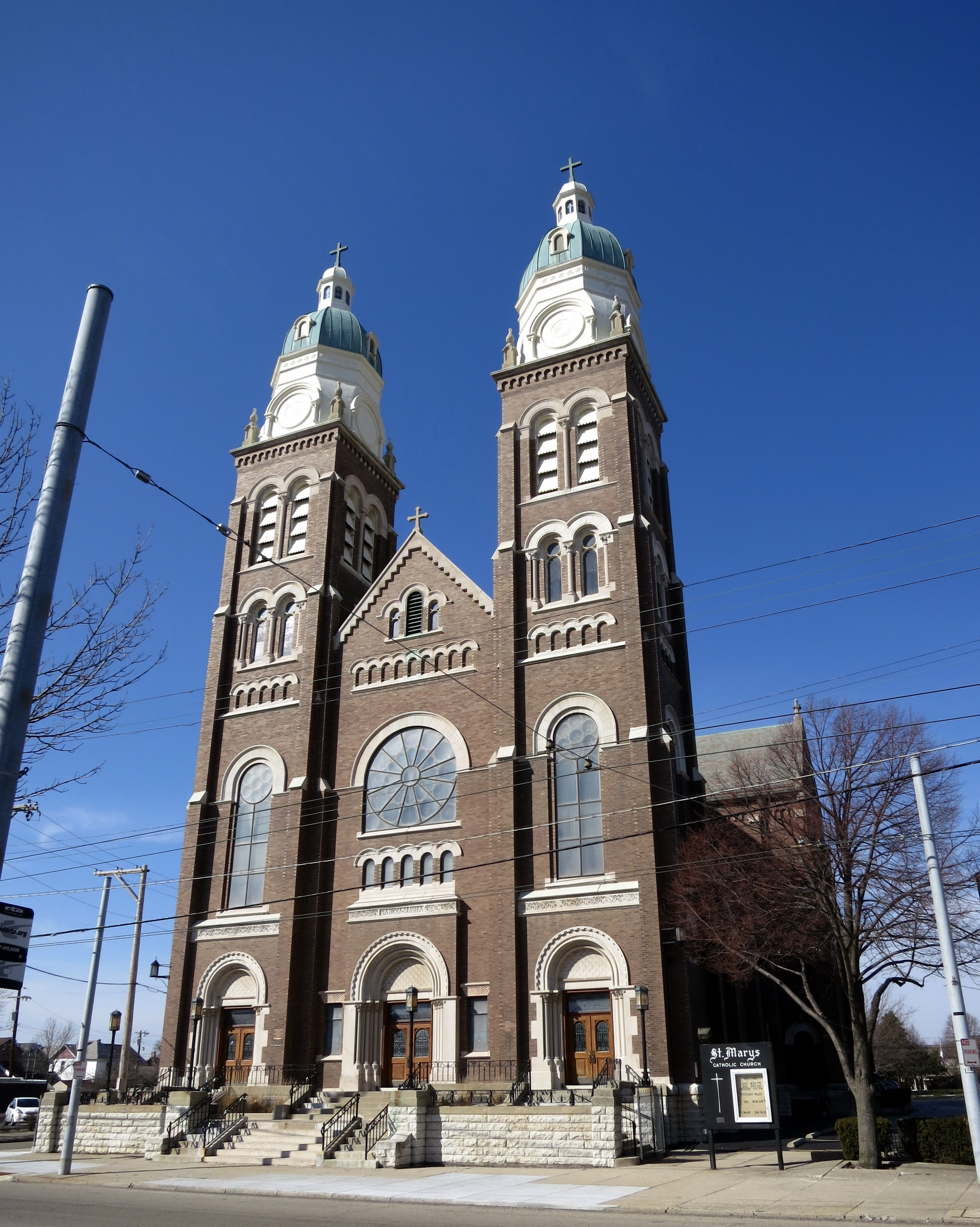
- Front and eastern side

- Location within Ohio Location within the United States
- Location: 543 Xenia Ave., Dayton, Ohio
- Coordinates: 39°45′11″N 84°10′5″W
- Area: 4 acres (1.6 ha)
- Built: 1906
- Architect: John B. Vermont
- Architectural style: Romanesque Revival
- NRHP reference No.: 83002012
- Added to NRHP: April 21, 1983

St. Mary's Catholic Church is a historic Catholic church building in an eastern neighborhood of Dayton, Ohio, United States. Constructed at the beginning of the twentieth century, it remains home to an active parish. Its grand architecture has made it an aviator's landmark, and it has been named a historic site by the federal government.

== Parish history ==
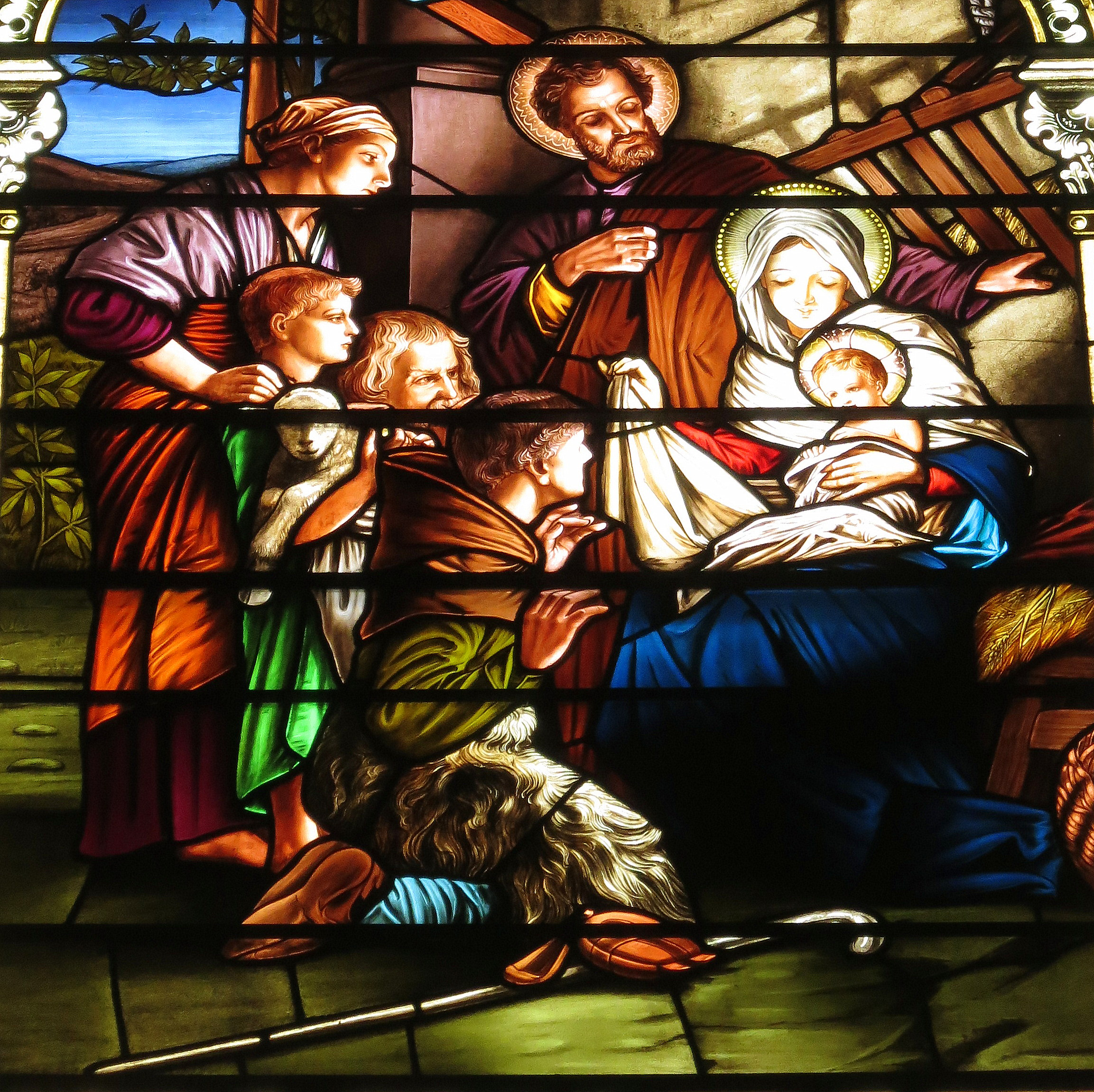
Stained glass window from the church depicting the Adoration of the Shepherds

Emanuel Church, the first Catholic parish in Dayton, was formed in 1837. Many English-speaking families left to form a separate parish in 1846, but Emanuel continued growing to the point that division was necessary by the end of the 1850s. Accordingly, land was chosen on Xenia Avenue at the Allen Street intersection in one of the city's eastern neighborhoods, and the owner donated enough property to permit the construction of a church, rectory, and school. Archbishop Purcell of Cincinnati laid the cornerstone in April 1859, and the finished building was consecrated by Purcell and Henry Damian Juncker, the Bishop of Alton, in August of the following year. The building measured 110 by 50 feet (34 m × 15 m), but by the opening years of the twentieth century, the parish had outgrown it, and construction began on a new building; Archbishop Moeller laid the cornerstone in July 1905 and consecrated it in November 1906. Growth continued, and St. Anthony's Church was established in 1913 by families coming out of St. Mary's.

St. Mary's remains an active part of the Archdiocese of Cincinnati to the present day. Masses are celebrated both in English and in Spanish.

== Architecture ==
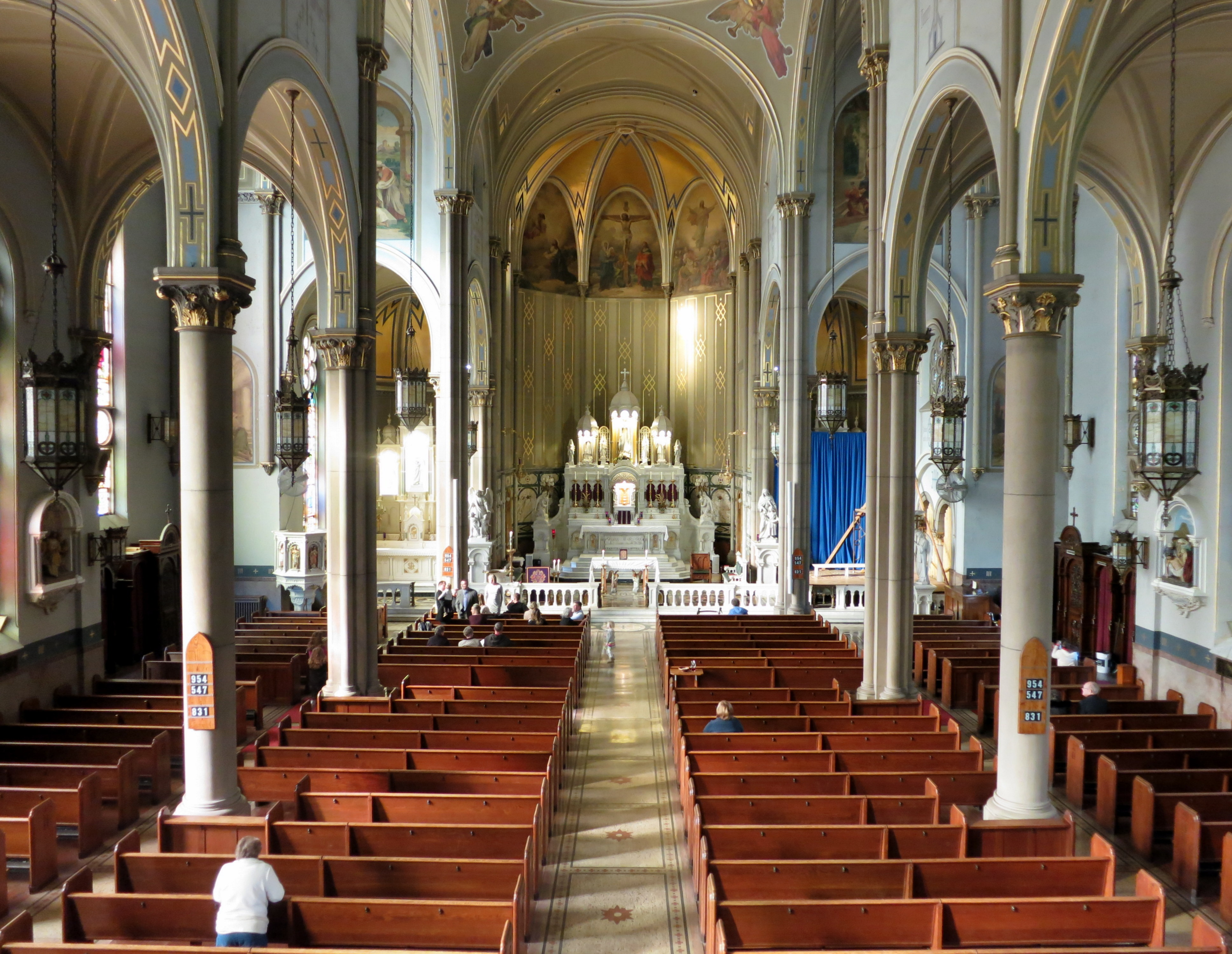
Interior

The current St. Mary's Church is a Romanesque Revival structure built in a mix of brick and stone. Constructed according to a design by John B. Vermont, the design features two massive clock towers on the three-bay facade. Three large doorways piece the facade at the top of a staircase, with occasional large windows and numerous pairs of narrower windows on higher levels. Each window is topped with a dormered dome above the clock. Built at a cost of $125,000 (or $3240741 in 2013 dollars), the church is a landmark because of the twin towers; during World War II, Army aviators used it as a waypoint when navigating to the runways at Wright Field.

== Preservation ==
In April 1983, St. Mary's Church was listed on the National Register of Historic Places. Although as a religious property it would not normally be considered eligible for designation, it nevertheless qualified because of its distinctive historic architecture. It is one of five Dayton churches on the Register, along with Sacred Heart, St. Adalbert's, and Holy Cross Catholic Churches and First Lutheran Church.
