= Olive Branch High School =

Olive Branch High School may refer to:

- Olive Branch High School (Olive Branch, Mississippi)
- Olive Branch High School (New Carlisle, Ohio)
