= Walnut Hills, Ohio =

Walnut Hills may refer to:

- Walnut Hills, Cincinnati, Ohio
- Walnut Hills, Dayton, Ohio
