= Engine Company 9 Fire Station =

- U.S. National Register of Historic Places
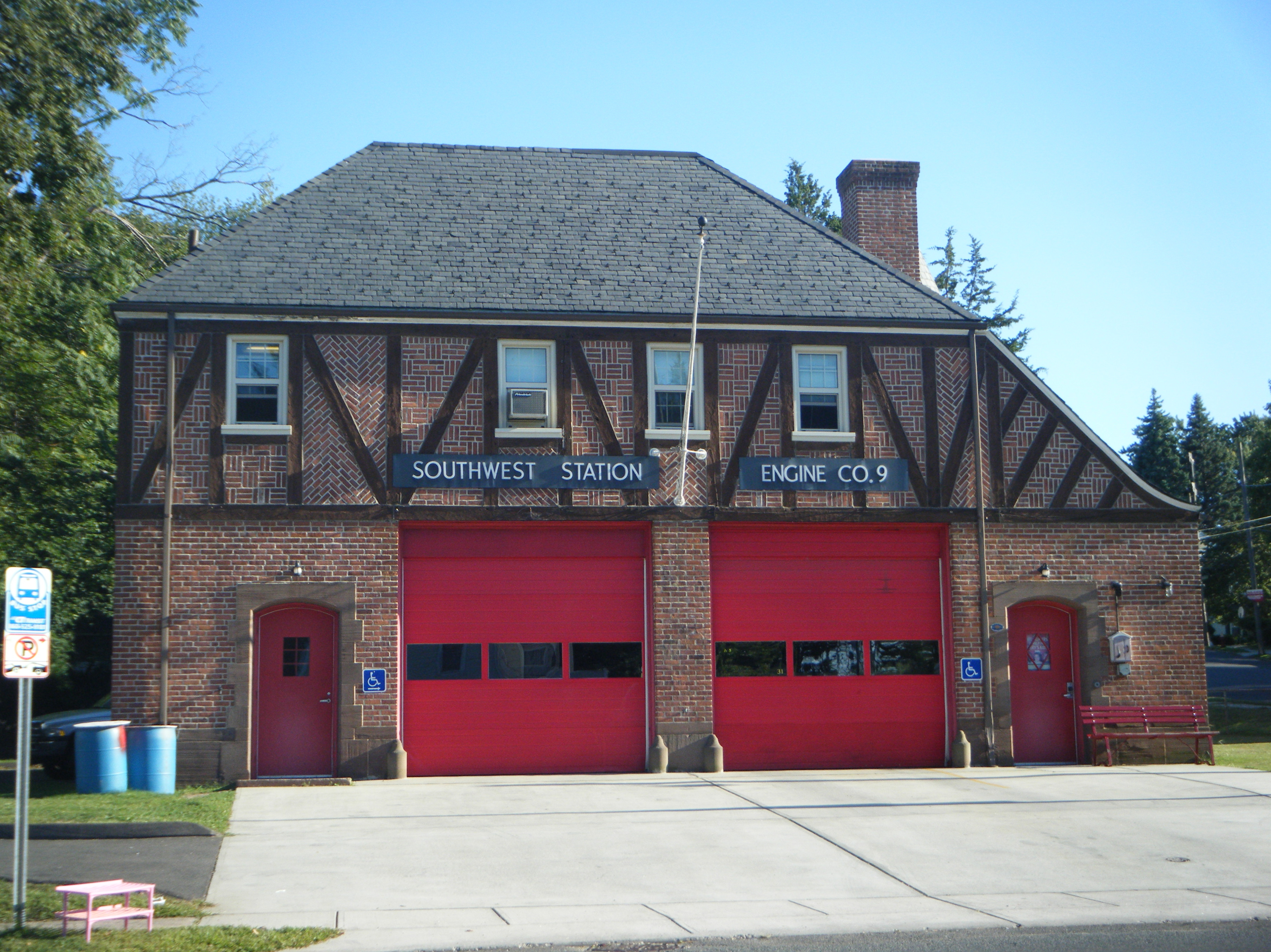

- Location within Connecticut Location within the United States
- Location: 655 New Britain Avenue, Hartford, Connecticut
- Coordinates: 41°44′0″N 72°42′13″W
- Area: 0.4 acres (0.16 ha)
- Built: 1929
- Architect: Ebbets & Frid
- Architectural style: Tudor Revival
- MPS: Firehouses of Hartford MPS
- NRHP reference No.: 89000024
- Added to NRHP: March 2, 1989

The Engine Company 9 Fire Station is located at 655 New Britain Avenue in Hartford, Connecticut. Built in 1929, it is a distinctive application of the Tudor Revival to firehouse design, and it was one of the city's first "suburban" fire stations, set in an originally less-developed outlying area. The building was listed on the National Register of Historic Places on March 2, 1989. It continues to serve its original function, housing Engine Company 9 of the Hartford Fire Department.

== Description and history ==
The Engine Company 9 Fire Station is located in southwestern Hartford, on the south side of New Britain Avenue at its junction with Forster Street. It is a two-story brick building, with a brownstone foundation and trim. It is covered by a hip roof, and has a circular turret with conical roof near the rear of its right side. The front facade is asymmetrical, with a pair of equipment bays at the center. Although there are symmetrically placed pedestrian entrances flanking those bays, that on the left is under the main roof mass, while that on the right is under a section where the roof line descends to the first floor. The upper level has four sash windows, and is finished in brick laid in a basket weave pattern, sections separated by half-timbering in the Tudor Revival style. The interior is relatively simple and unaltered.

Engine Company 9 was organized by the city in 1900, and this is its second station. It was designed by the Hartford firm of Ebbets and Frid, and built in 1929; its style is similar to that of the Engine Company 16 Fire Station, built about the same time. Set in a residential neighborhood south of downtown, it was designed to blend in with the houses surrounding it. Engine 9 was one of the city's first "suburban" stations, set outside its urban core.

== See also ==
- National Register of Historic Places listings in Hartford, Connecticut
