= Commercial Building (Dayton, Ohio) =

- U.S. National Register of Historic Places
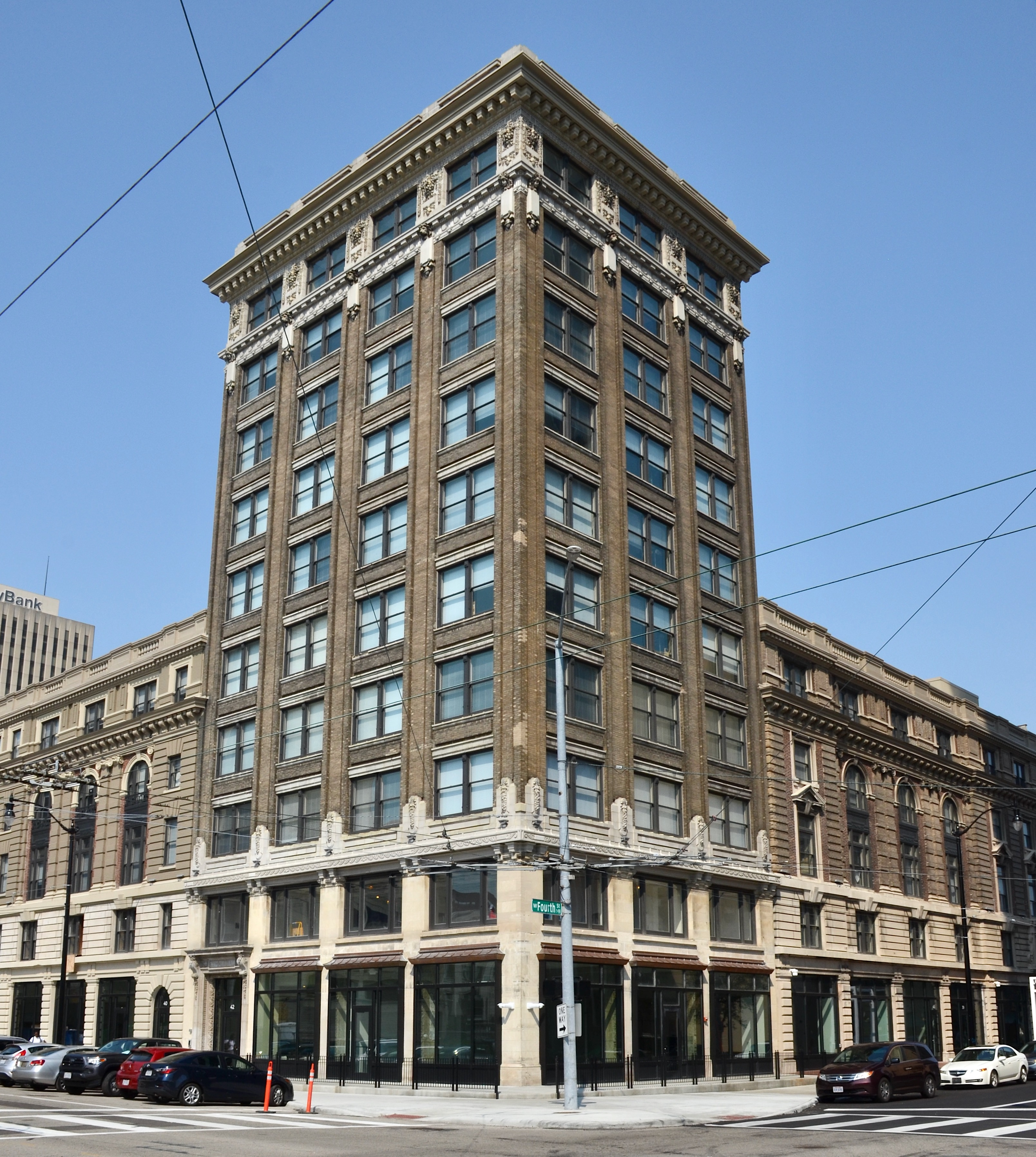
- Viewed from the southwest, 2021

- Location within Ohio Location within the United States
- Location: 44 S. Ludlow St., Dayton, Ohio
- Coordinates: 39°45′29″N 84°11′35″W
- Area: 0.1 acres (0.040 ha)
- Built: 1908
- Architect: Peters, Burns, and Pretzinger
- Architectural style: Neo-Renaissance
- NRHP reference No.: 82001477
- Added to NRHP: December 2, 1982

The Commercial Building is a historic skyscraper in central Dayton, Ohio, United States. Constructed in the early twentieth century, it played an important part in the development of the western portion of downtown Dayton, and it is one of the most prominent surviving examples of the work of one of the most significant architects in the city's history. Located at the edge of what was once one of the city's leading commercial complexes, it has been named a historic site.

== Architecture ==
Built of brick with elements of stone, the Commercial Building is a ten-story structure surrounded by smaller buildings. Its front (southern side) is divided into three bays, while the western side is divided into four. Among its more distinctive elements is its ornate main entrance, which forms a crucial component of the building's Neo-Renaissance styling. Two-over-two windows fill large areas of the upper stories. The building sits on the Ludlow and Fourth Streets, connected to the Dayton Arcade, which was among the leading commercial complexes of the early 20th-century city.

== Early history ==
At its completion in 1908, the Commercial Building was one of the most important parts of Dayton's skyline, being one of just five high-rises in the city. It was built at the behest of Adam Schantz, Jr., who at the time was one of Dayton's leading citizens; more than any other man, he was responsible for the appearance of the city's skyline, he impelled extensive construction along Ludlow, he headed one of the city's largest companies, and he was responsible for the development of the Schantz Park neighborhood in the suburb of Oakwood. Schantz chose a leading architect to design his new building: by the late twentieth century, Albert Pretzinger had gained the reputation of being the most important architect native to Dayton in the city's history.

== Late twentieth century ==
In 1982, the Commercial Building was listed on the National Register of Historic Places. While its architecture was significant enough to qualify it for this designation, a crucial part of its significance derives from its close connection to Adam Schantz, Jr. It is one of nearly 150 National Register-listed locations in Montgomery County, along with sites such as the former Dayton Daily News Building, located on another corner of Fourth and Ludlow, and the Dayton Arcade next door. However, the historic designation has not ensured these buildings' continued well-being: the Arcade was empty for several decades until recently, the Dayton Daily News Building was vacated in 2007 and later partly demolished, with only its oldest part from 1908 preserved and the Commercial Building itself has received so little maintenance that the city has cordoned off the surrounding sidewalks to prevent pedestrians from being hit by glass falling from the building's windows. Nevertheless, some hope for its restoration remains: a group from Wisconsin has been attempting to restore the Arcade Building with hopes of seeing it reopen and of participating in downtown revitalization.

== See also ==
- National Register of Historic Places listings in Dayton, Ohio
