= Charles Insco Williams =

American architect

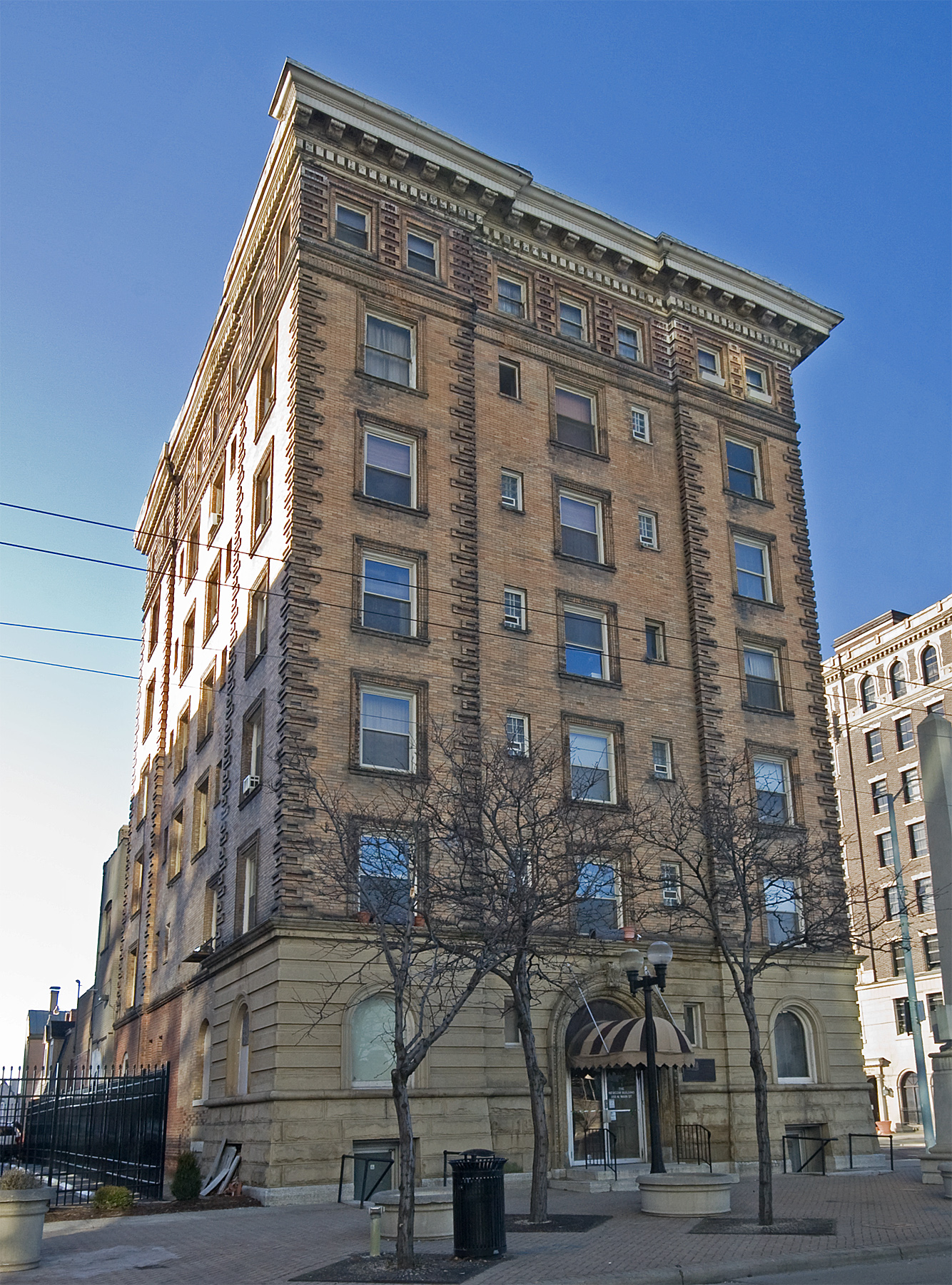
Insco Apartment Building

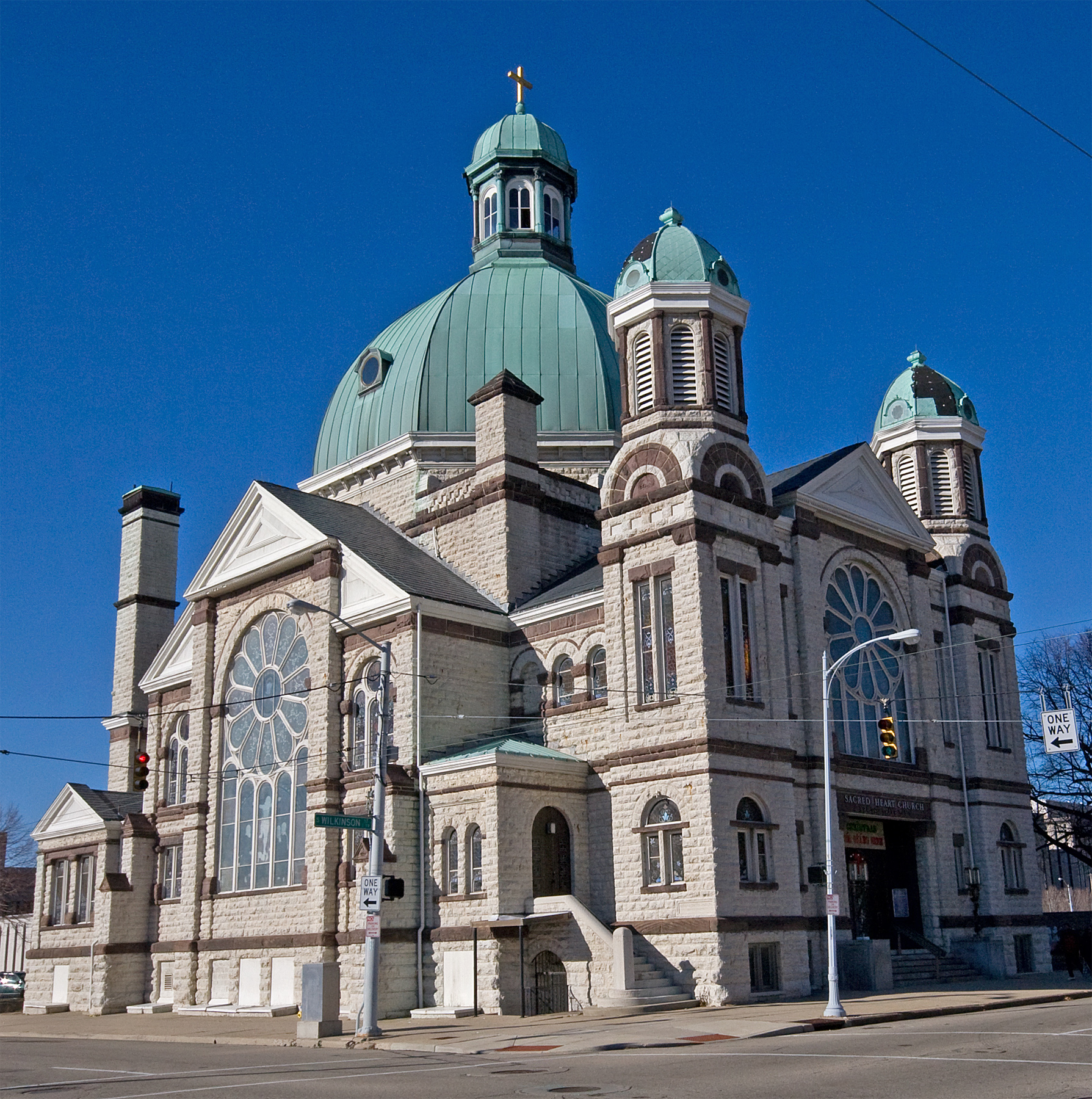
Sacred Heart Church (Dayton, Ohio)

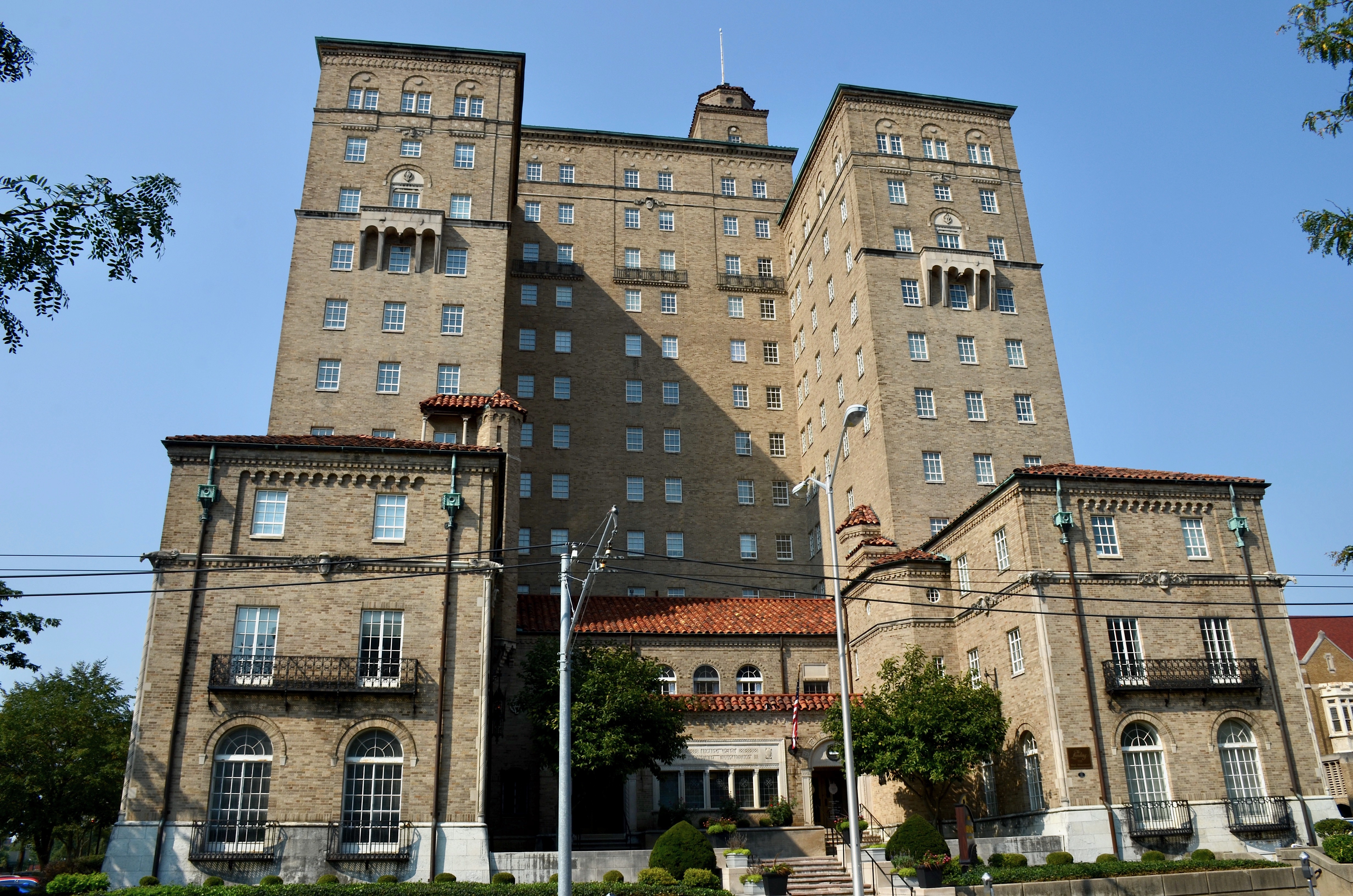
Dayton YMCA building

Charles Insco Williams (December 12, 1853 - February 13, 1923) was an artist and architect in Dayton, Ohio.

== Biography ==
He was born on December 12, 1853, to Mary Forman and John Insco Williams. His father seems to have been an accomplished painter. His sister, Eva Best, was a writer. At sixteen, he moved with his parents to Cincinnati and graduated from the Chickering Institute of Cincinnati, Ohio in 1870. He received "formal training" at Troy Polytechnic School of New York.

Williams was employed in 1873 as a civil engineer on the Northern Pacific Railroad. He later returned to Dayton and worked as an artist for seven years, and worked in his brother-in-law William H Best's jewellery shop. Then he worked for John Rouzer Co., a lumber dealer for two years.

== Architectural career ==
He opened his own architectural office in 1882, becoming "one of the most prominent representatives of this calling not only in Dayton, but in the state.

== Personal life ==
He married Susan Dorothy Boyer on June 26, 1879. She was the daughter of D.K. Boyer, and they had four sons: Howard Insco v, Louis Boyer Williams, Dick K. Williams, and Roger Williams. He was part of the Masonry, Commandery, Consistory, and Mystic Shrine, as well as part of the Dayton City Club and Christ Episcopal Church. According to a 1909 account of Dayton's history he exercised "his right of franchise in support of the Republican Party, manifesting intelligent appreciation of its sterling principles and the policy pursued in the management of government affairs."

== Projects in Dayton ==
- Stivers Manual Training High School (1908) on east Fifth Street (which became Stivers High School and is now Stivers School for the Arts) A National Register of Historic Places building
- Algonquin Hotel, Dayton, Ohio
- Sacred Heart Church (1887) (still standing) a three floor Romanesque Revival church with a limestone facade 37-45 South Wilkinson Street / 217 West Fourth Street
- Reibold Building (Elder Dry Goods Store) (1896) an 11-story building at 117 S. Main Street 155 that was the tallest building in the city when it was built. Albert Pretzinger's Peters Burns and Pretzinger firm is also credited as an architect of the building. 101-121 South Main Street. The building was renovated in 2002 and is used as a government office.
- Insco Apartment Building
- Bellevue Apartment House
- YMCA building, Dayton, Ohio Fourth Street
- Trinity Reformed Church Jefferson Street
- Dayton City Club
- Callahan Bank Building

== Other projects ==
- Two school houses in Riverdale
- School building in North Dayton
- Methodist Episcopal Church in North Dayton
- Olive Branch High School in New Carlisle
