= Insco Apartments Building =

- U.S. National Register of Historic Places
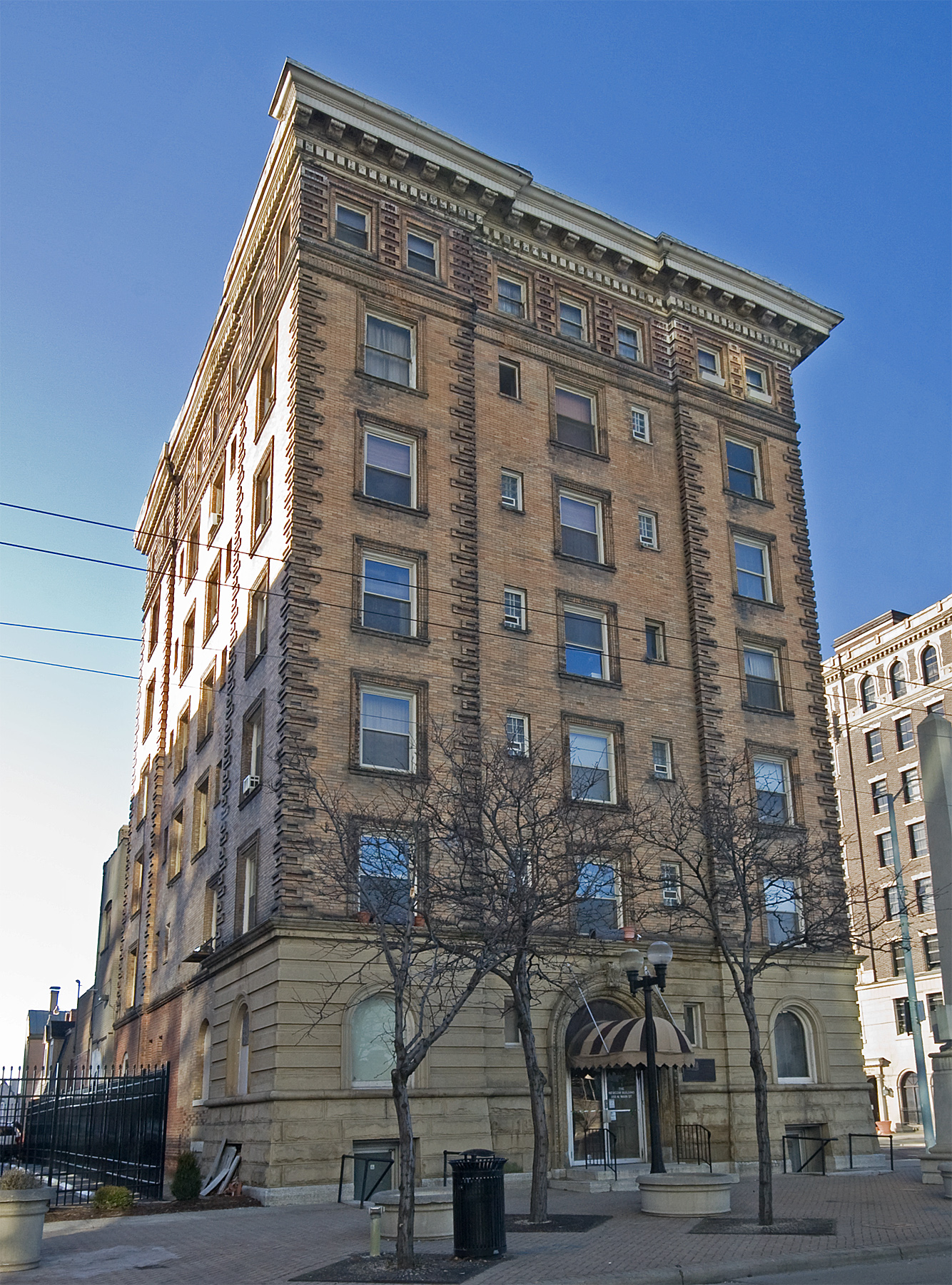
- Front of the building

- Location within Ohio Location within the United States
- Location: 255 N. Main St., Dayton, Ohio
- Coordinates: 39°45′48.5″N 84°11′36″W
- Area: Less than 1 acre (0.40 ha)
- Built: 1894
- Architect: Charles Insco Williams
- Architectural style: Second Renaissance Revival
- NRHP reference No.: 93001390
- Added to NRHP: February 18, 1994

The Insco Apartments is a historic apartment building in downtown Dayton, Ohio, United States. It was designed by Charles Insco Williams, a native of Dayton, and constructed in 1894. Williams designed the structure after an apartment hotel that he had seen on Fifth Avenue in New York City; he did not copy the design slavishly, but many of the architectural themes present in the Insco Apartments were derived ultimately from the unspecified New York City apartment building.

The Insco Apartments were the focus of an early historic preservation battle. The location for which they had been planned, at the junction of Main Street and Monument Avenue, had been occupied since Dayton's earliest days by a still-standing log cabin. This building had been used for numerous purposes over the past century, including serving as the first courthouse and jail for Montgomery County, the city's first school, its earliest church, and even its first tavern. Opposition to its demolition arose for fear that children might lose the last of what today would be called the built environment of their great-grandparents' day, including this log cabin whose walls still bore bullets from Indian raids. The champion of the save-the-cabin cause was Mary Steele, whose columns in the local paper impelled many influential citizens toward saving the cabin and moving it elsewhere.

None of the building's original plans survive; they, along with practically all of the original plans produced by Williams' office, disappeared many years ago. Built of brick on a stone foundation and covered with an asbestos roof, it was constructed to permit Williams to advertise it as "the only fire-proof apartment in southwest Ohio" upon its completion at the cost of $168,000. Instead of simply designing buildings for others' use, Williams embarked on real estate development, operating the apartment buildings he designed; he would mortgage each building soon after its completion in order to obtain money for the next one, and rents from his tenants would finance the mortgage. For many years, this scheme worked admirably, but the chaos during and after the Great Flood of 1913 completely upset it, and Williams' banks foreclosed on the Insco and other Williams-owned properties as a result.

At its centenary, the Insco was accorded national recognition by being placed on the National Register of Historic Places, qualifying both because of its architecture and because of its place in local history.

== See also ==
- National Register of Historic Places listings in Dayton, Ohio
