= Pretzinger =

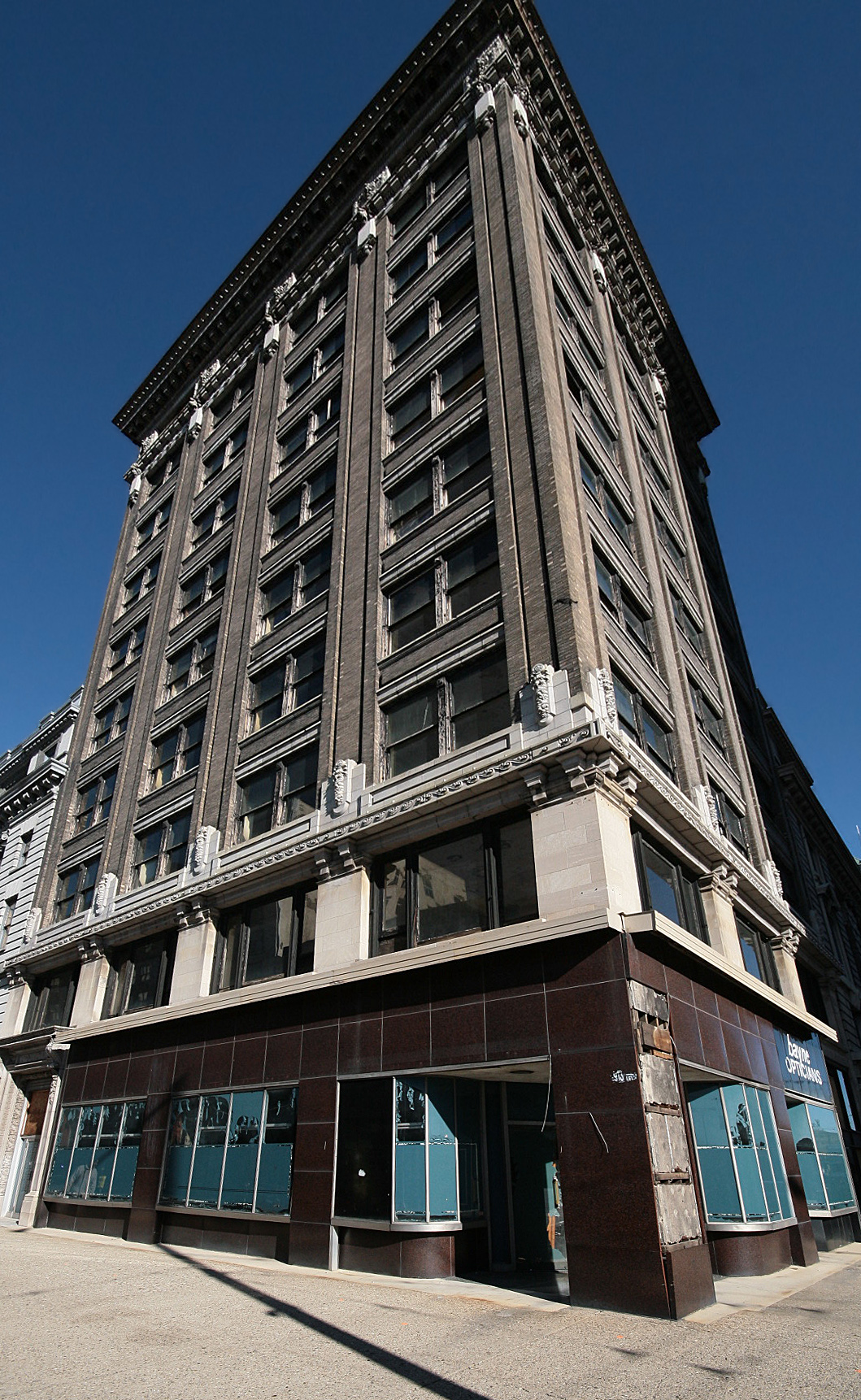
Commercial Building (1908) in Dayton, Ohio designed by Peters, Burns & Pretzinger

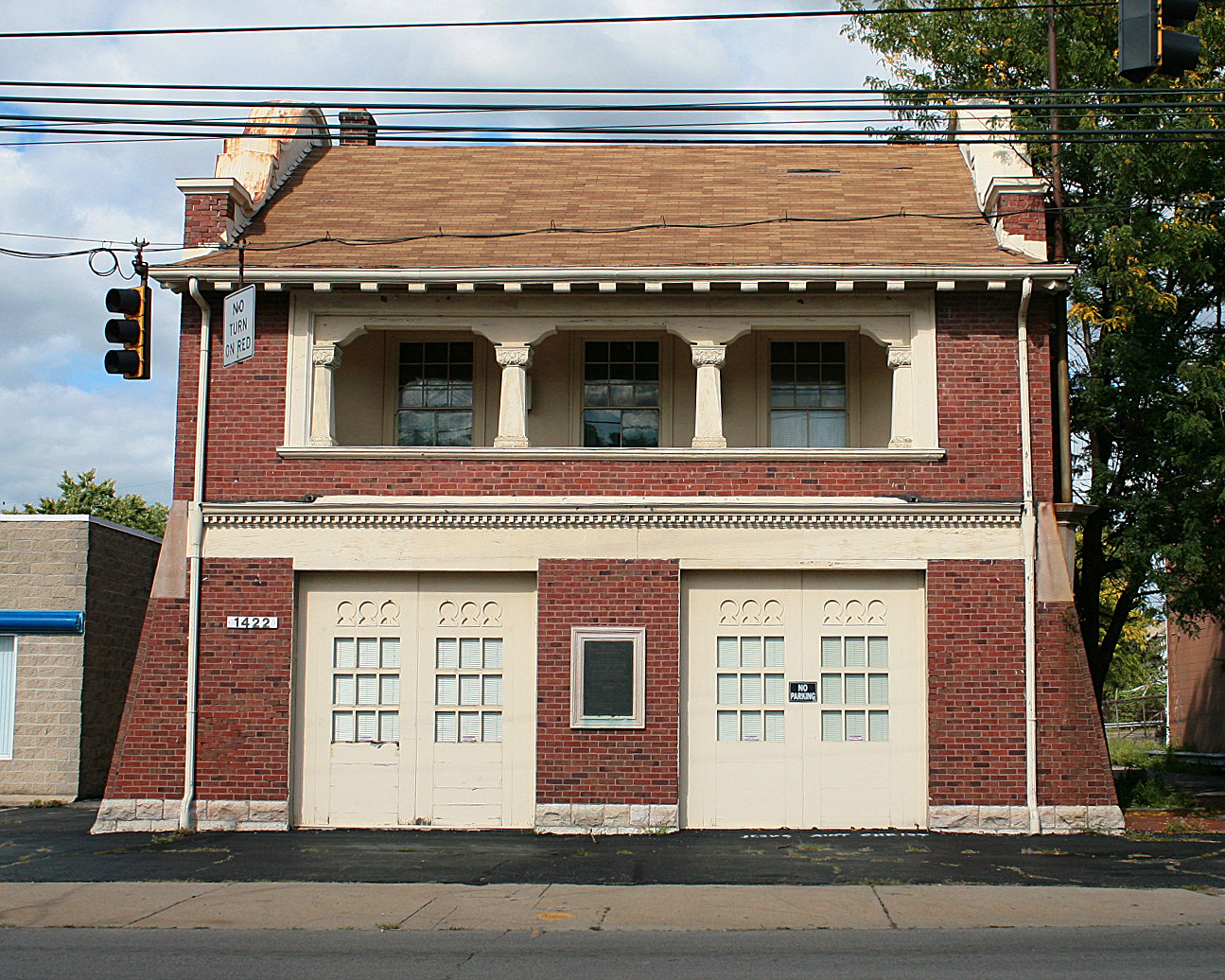
Dayton Fire Station No. 14 by Peters, Burns & Pretzinger

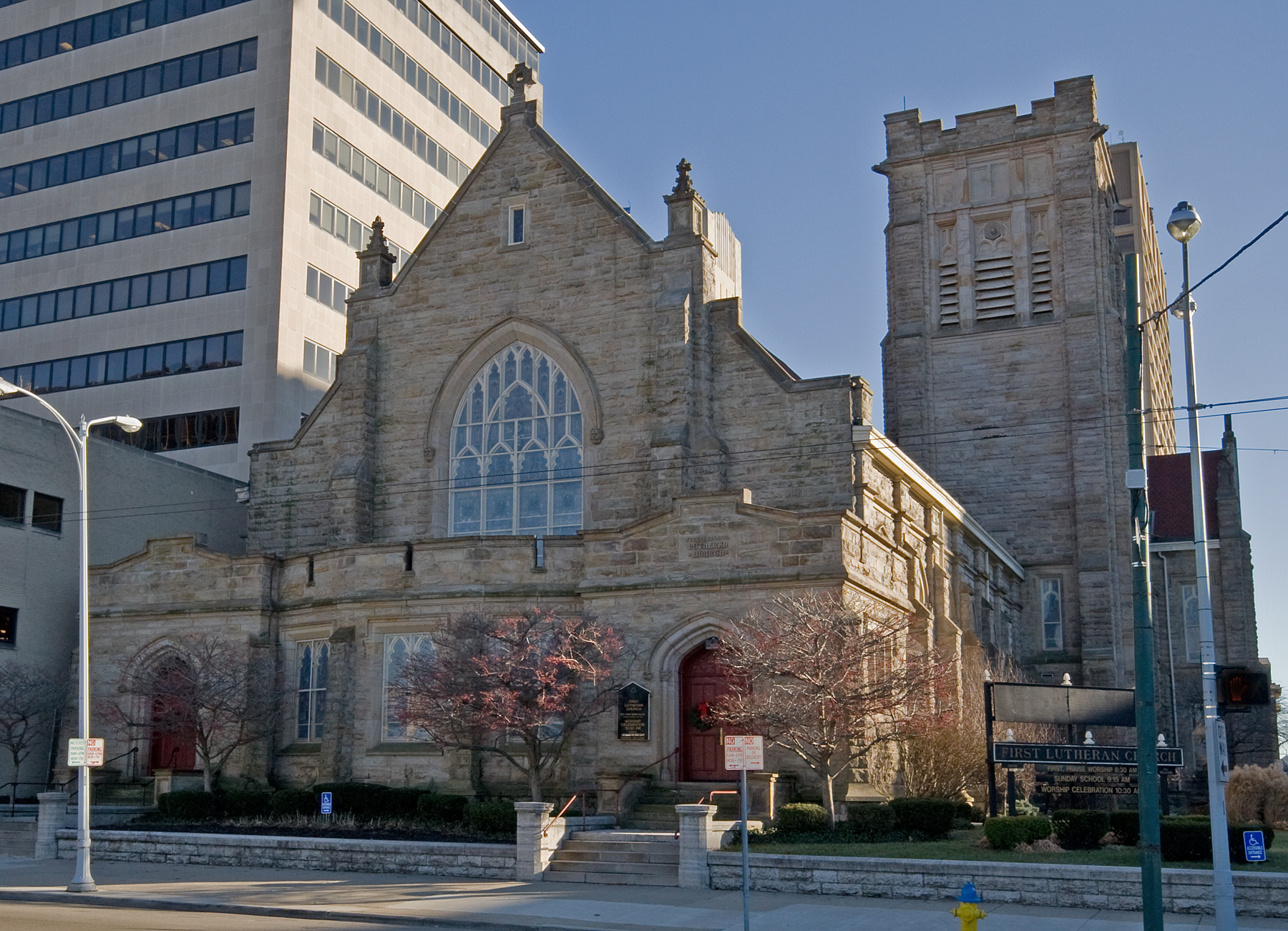
First Lutheran Church in Dayton, Ohio designed by Peters, Burns, & Pretzinger

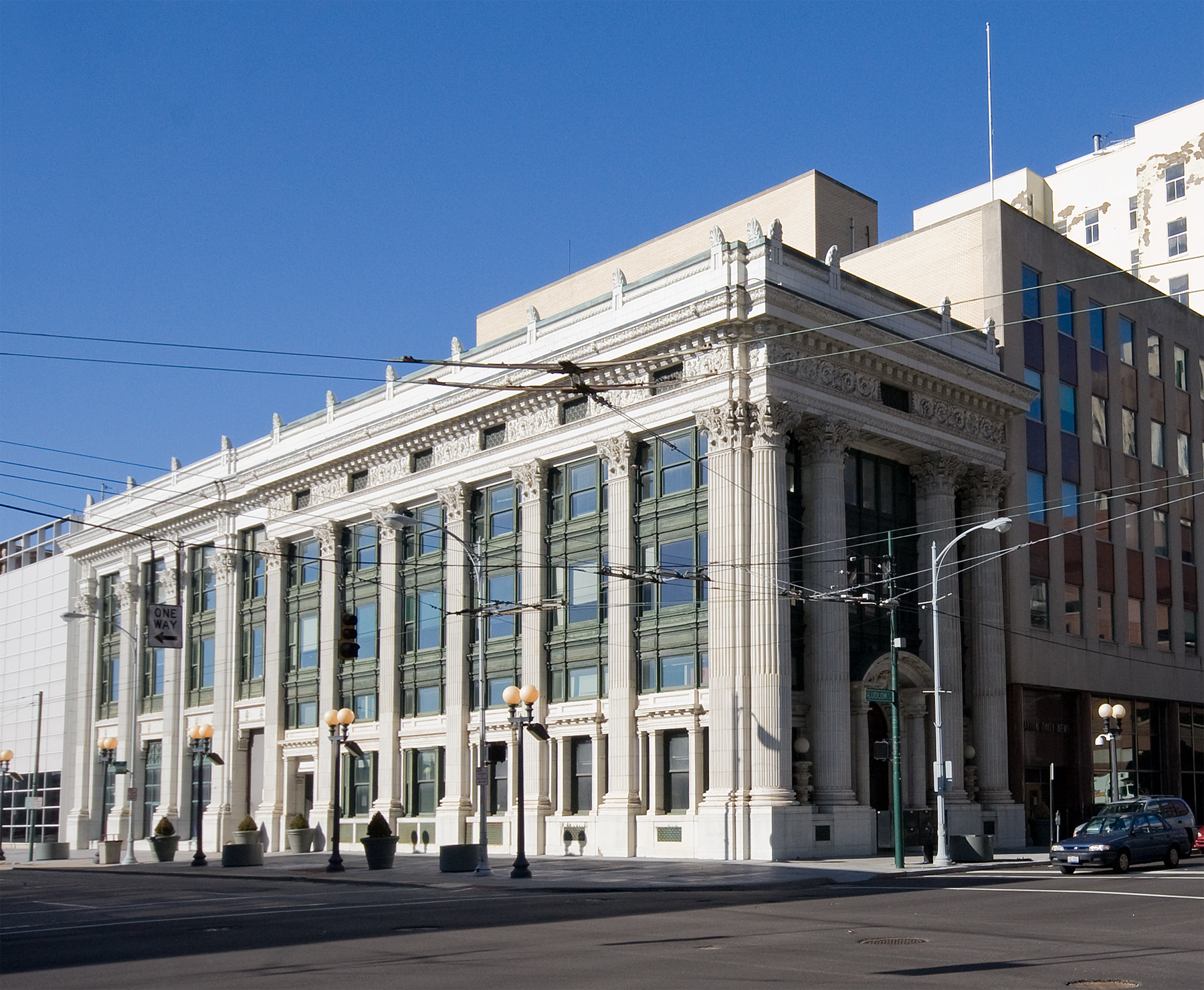
The Beaux Arts style Dayton Daily News Building designed by Albert Pretzinger

The Pretzinger name belongs to a family of architects and engineers in Dayton, Ohio. Albert Pretzinger (born February 28, 1863) started the family's architectural legacy.

In 1892 he was with Peters, Burns & Pretzinger. He established his own firm Albert Pretzinger Architect by 1906. He was part of Pretzinger & Musselman in 1913 and Pretzinger & Pretzinger in 1928. The firm became Freeman A. Pretzinger Architect in 1941 before switching to Pretzinger and Pretzinger by 1962, and Pretzinger and Pretzinger Architects and Engineers in 1968. In 1980 the firm became Robert B. Pretzinger, Consulting Engineer, changing in 1982 to Pretzinger and Klenke, Inc. Consulting Engineers. After Thomas Klenke retired in the mid-1990s, the firm's name reverted to Robert B. Pretzinger, Consulting Engineer. The firm closed in 2010 with the death of Robert Pretzinger.

== Colonial Theater, Dayton ==
Albert Pretzinger's work included the Colonial Theater (later the RKO Colonial Theatre) on Ludlow Street. It featured premium reserve balcony seating, twenty individual dressing rooms, and two chorus rooms. Showings changed from vaudeville to movies, and then western movies and burlesque shows as management sought to capture a profitable audience. The 1,800-seat theater hosted Dayton's first "talkies" on September 22, 1928, with showings of Lights of New York bringing in the throngs. The theater had its own chorus, the Colonialettes, and a band during its prime, and acts who took the stage included the Three Stooges, Jimmy Durante, and Ozzie & Harriet.

In 1930, the Colonial became part of RKO and started showing second-run and B movies. By 1964 the theater was sold to St. John's Lutheran Church and was demolished to build a new church.

Records from the Pretzinger firms were donated to Wright State University by Robert Pretzinger in 1994.

== Projects ==
- Rudolph Pretzinger House, 908 S. Main St, Dayton
- Duncarrick Mansion, an example of American provincial architecture with Tudor detail. Designed by Peters, Burns and Pretzinger and listed on the NRHP. Birthplace and lifelong residence of Katharine Kennedy Brown (1891–1986), daughter of Grafton C. Kennedy. Brown began her political activities in 1920, shortly after women won suffrage, and served as Ohio's Republican national Committeewoman from 1932 through 1968.
- First Lutheran Church, 138 West First Street, designed by Peters, Burns, & Pretzinger in Dayton, Ohio. The Late Gothic Revival church was added to the National Register of Historic Places in 1983.
- RKO Colonial Theatre (1912), an 1810-seat theater at 141 S. Ludlow Street Dayton, Ohio (demolished)
- Commercial Building, designed by Peters, Burns and Pretzinger in Dayton, Ohio (1908), added to the National Register of Historic Places (NRHP) in 1982.
- Dayton Fire Station No. 14 at 1422 N. Main St., designed by Peters, Burns & Pretzinger in Dayton, Ohio. Mission/Spanish Revival style building added to the National Register of Historic Places in 1980.
- Springfield High School (1909–1911), a Beaux Arts style building designed by Albert Pretzinger: from one-room schools and Carnegie ... Modeled after the Library of Congress building in Washington D.C.
- Dayton Daily News Building at the corner of 4th and Ludlow Streets in Dayton, Ohio, designed by Albert Pretzinger. Added to the National Register of Historic Places 1978.
- University of Dayton Arena, Pretzinger and Pretzinger Architects and Engineers (1969)
- Reibold Building in Dayton, Ohio. Peters Burns and Pretzinger are credited as architects as well as Dayton native Charles Insco Williams
- Adam Schantz buildings, in Dayton, Ohio
- Theodore Marston House / Major Renovation 1918 214 S. Main St. Middletown, Ohio
- Sorg Mansion / Major Renovation 1901 in Middletown, Ohio
- Sorg Opera House / Major Renovation 1906 in Middletown, Ohio
