= Walnut Hills, Dayton, Ohio =

Coordinates: 39°44′45″N 84°10′01″W

Walnut Hills is a neighborhood in Dayton, Ohio, United States. It is roughly bounded by Wayne Avenue to the south, Pursell Avenue to the east, Wyoming Street to the north, and Woodland Cemetery to the west. Walnut Hills borders the neighborhoods of Twin Towers and Linden Heights to the north, Hearthstone to the east, and Belmont to the south.

Walnut Hills is a section of Dayton that was once mainly farm fields. Woodland Cemetery, the highest point in Dayton, is located in Walnut Hills. During the Great Dayton Flood of 1913, the area remained mostly dry, a factor that contributed to its larger population today. In the 1960s, when the population of Dayton began to fall, Walnut Hills' population remained stable.

Considered a streetcar suburb during its expansion, the neighborhood is known for its electric powered trolleybuses operating on the Dayton trolleybus system. They utilize overhead wiring first used by the streetcars. Workers from NCR, Delco and Frigidaire made extensive use of the streetcar network during its peak.

== Name ==
The neighborhood is named after its many walnut trees.

== See also ==
- Twin Towers, Dayton, Ohio
