= UD Arena =

Multi-purpose arena in Dayton, Ohio, US

University of Dayton Arena
- UD Arena
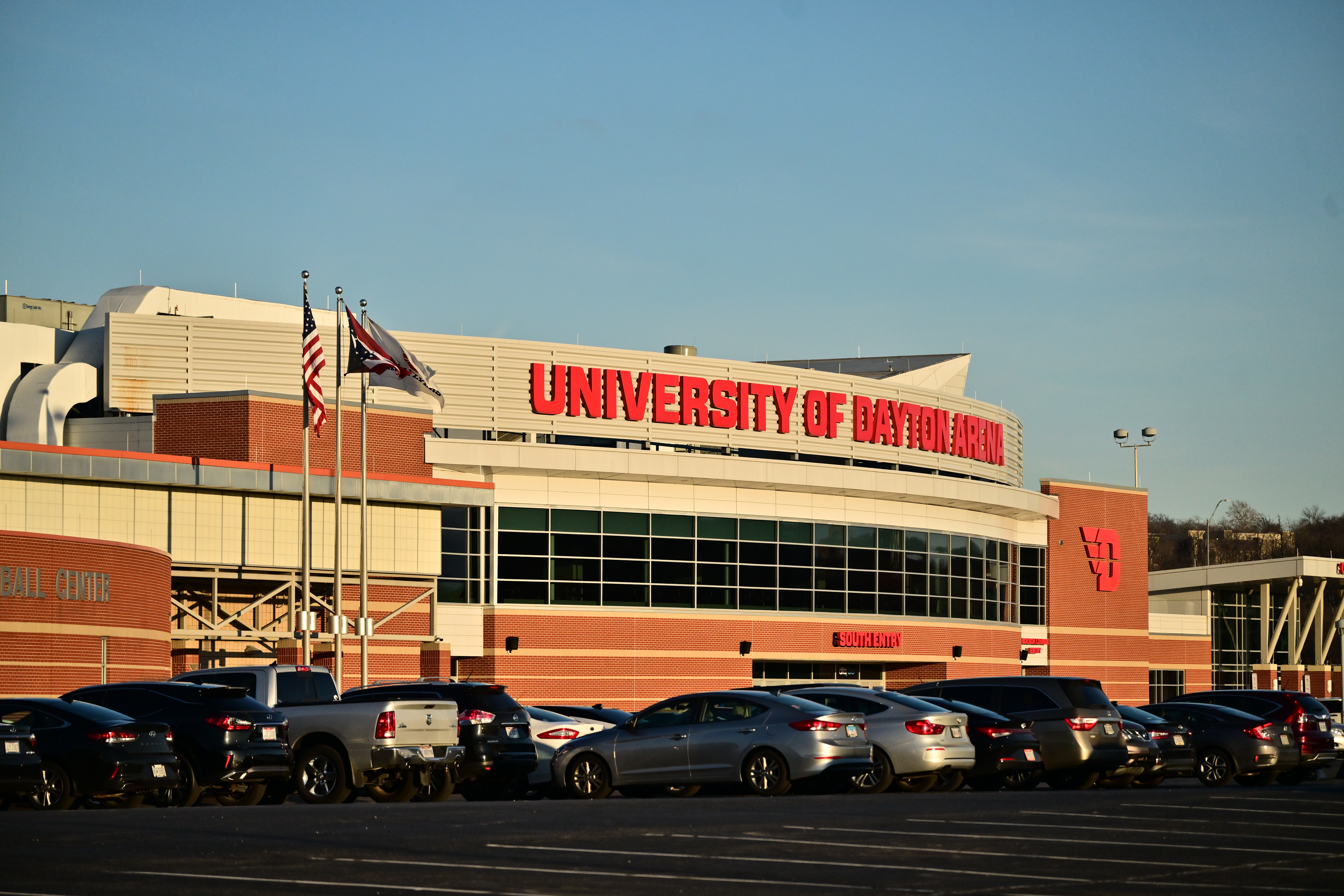
- Interactive map of University of Dayton Arena
- Location: 1801 Edwin C Moses Blvd. Dayton, OH 45417
- Owner: University of Dayton
- Capacity: 13,409 (basketball); 14,000 (full-house events); 5,500 (half-house events)

Construction
- Groundbreaking: November 7, 1968
- Opened: December 6, 1969
- Renovated: 1998; 2002; 2017–2019
- Cost: approximately $4.5 million ($41.7 million in 2025 dollars)
- Architect: Pretzinger & Pretzinger (original design); GBBN Architects & 360 Architecture (2002 renovation)

Tenant
- Dayton Flyers (NCAA) (1969–present); NCAA's First Four (2001–present)

University of Dayton Arena (commonly known as UD Arena) is a 13,409-seat multi-purpose arena located in Dayton, Ohio. The arena opened in 1969. It is home to the University of Dayton Flyers basketball teams. From 2001 to 2010, the facility hosted the annual "play-in" game in the NCAA men's basketball tournament (officially the "opening round" game) which featured the teams rated 64th and 65th in the tournament field. Since 2011, when the tournament expanded to four opening-round games, the arena continued to host all "first four" games. Overall, the arena has hosted more men's NCAA Division I basketball tournament games than any other venue.

The playing court is known as Blackburn Court, named after historic UD coach Tom Blackburn. The Donoher Center expansion on the southwest corner of the arena was completed in 1998. Named for former Flyers basketball coach Don Donoher, the Center provides an NBA-caliber facility for conditioning and game preparation. The arena was extensively renovated during the summer of 2002. The additions include concession areas, luxury boxes, disabled access improvements, and a restaurant/bar. The venue was awarded the 2003 and 2004 Atlantic 10 Conference men's basketball tournaments. In 2010, four new video screens were installed, one in each of the arena's corners. Following the 2016–17 basketball season, a 3-year renovation project began at UD Arena. The renovations were completed by the 2019-20 season, and the arena was rededicated before the Flyers' season opener against Indiana State on November 9, 2019.

Since its opening in 1969, over 14 million visitors have attended events at the arena. In 2002, the arena was the site of the first ever high-definition television (HDTV) broadcast for ESPN.

== Construction ==
UD Arena was designed by Pretzinger & Pretzinger Architects and Engineers. Construction commenced on November 7, 1968.

The arena was opened on December 6, 1969.

== Arena attendance ==
As of 2017, the University of Dayton has ranked in the top 25 in the nation for attendance at the arena 21 times.

For the 2021-22 men's basketball season, the team accounted that every game was sold out prior to the season beginning.

== NCAA basketball tournament hosting ==
The arena has hosted NCAA Tournament games 24 times since it opened. Along with its hosting duties for the NCAA Men's Division I Basketball Opening Round game ("play-in" game), it also served as the host of the Midwestern Collegiate Conference (now Horizon League) men's basketball conference tournament from 1989 to 1991 and was the host of the Atlantic Ten Basketball tournament in 2003 and 2004. The arena hosted the Opening Round game through 2010, when it was also a regional venue for the women's tournament. It then became the first location for the revised opening round of four games for the men's tournament in March 2011.

The University of Dayton Arena hosted the Round of 64 and Round of 32 games of the 2001, 2006, 2009, and 2013 NCAA men's basketball tournaments. UD Arena hosted the First Four games every year since 2011, with the exceptions of 2020 (in which the entire tournament was canceled due to the COVID-19 pandemic in the United States) and 2021 (in which the entire tournament was moved to within the state of Indiana due to logistical concerns amid the pandemic). With the expansion of the tournament to 76 teams beginning in 2027, the Opening Round games will be split between UD Arena and another site to be determined. UD arena hosted the final game of legendary Kentucky head coach Adolph Rupp's career in 1972 as Kentucky fell to Florida State. Through the 2026 tournament, it has hosted 143 games in the NCAA men's basketball tournament over its history, making it the most used venue to host NCAA Men's Tournament games ahead of Kansas City's Municipal Auditorium which has hosted 83.

Because of its unique hosting position within the NCAA tourney, this creates a situation where the Flyers cannot play as the home team if invited to a non-NCAA tournament, which happened in 2025 when the Flyers were drawn as the #1 seed in the 2025 NIT in their region; the Flyers had to then play the Florida Atlantic Owls at their home arena in Boca Raton, Florida instead.

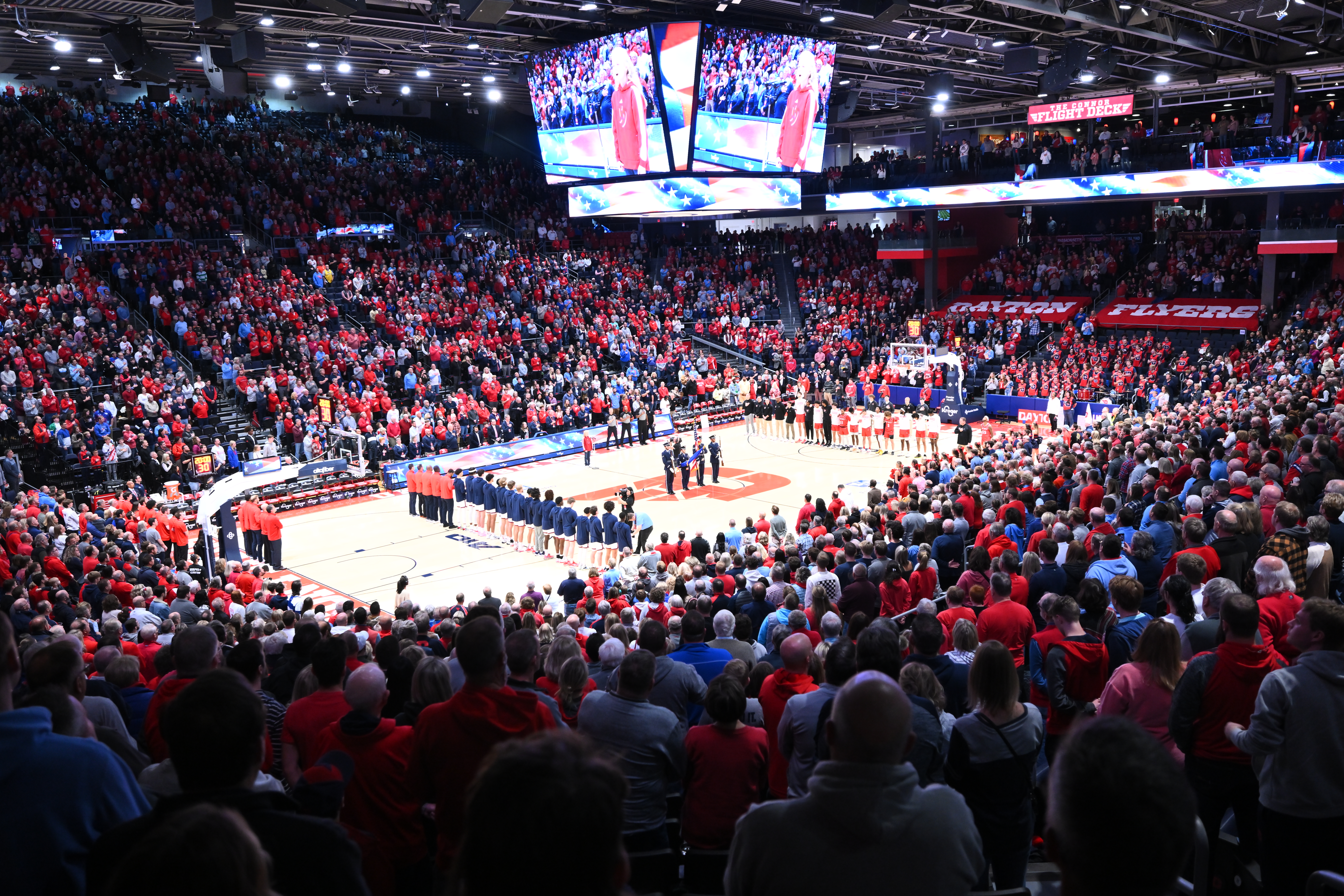

== Other events ==
As the largest indoor arena between Cincinnati and Columbus, UD Arena has hosted a handful of stops for concert tours. Elton John, Elvis Presley, Aerosmith, Rush, Bob Seger, Mötley Crüe, George Strait, Kenny Chesney, Usher, Lupe Fiasco, Jay-Z and others have performed there. It has been host to the Winter Guard International color guard, indoor percussion and winds World Championships since 2005. It hosted the Royal Hanneford Circus for most of the 1990s. WWE has hosted matches at the UD Arena since the 1980s. The Flyer Pep Band, UD's basketball pep band, plays at every UD basketball game at the arena. The University of Dayton holds its graduation ceremonies at the arena. The arena also started hosting the OHSAA Boy's and Girl's Basketball State Championships starting in 2021.

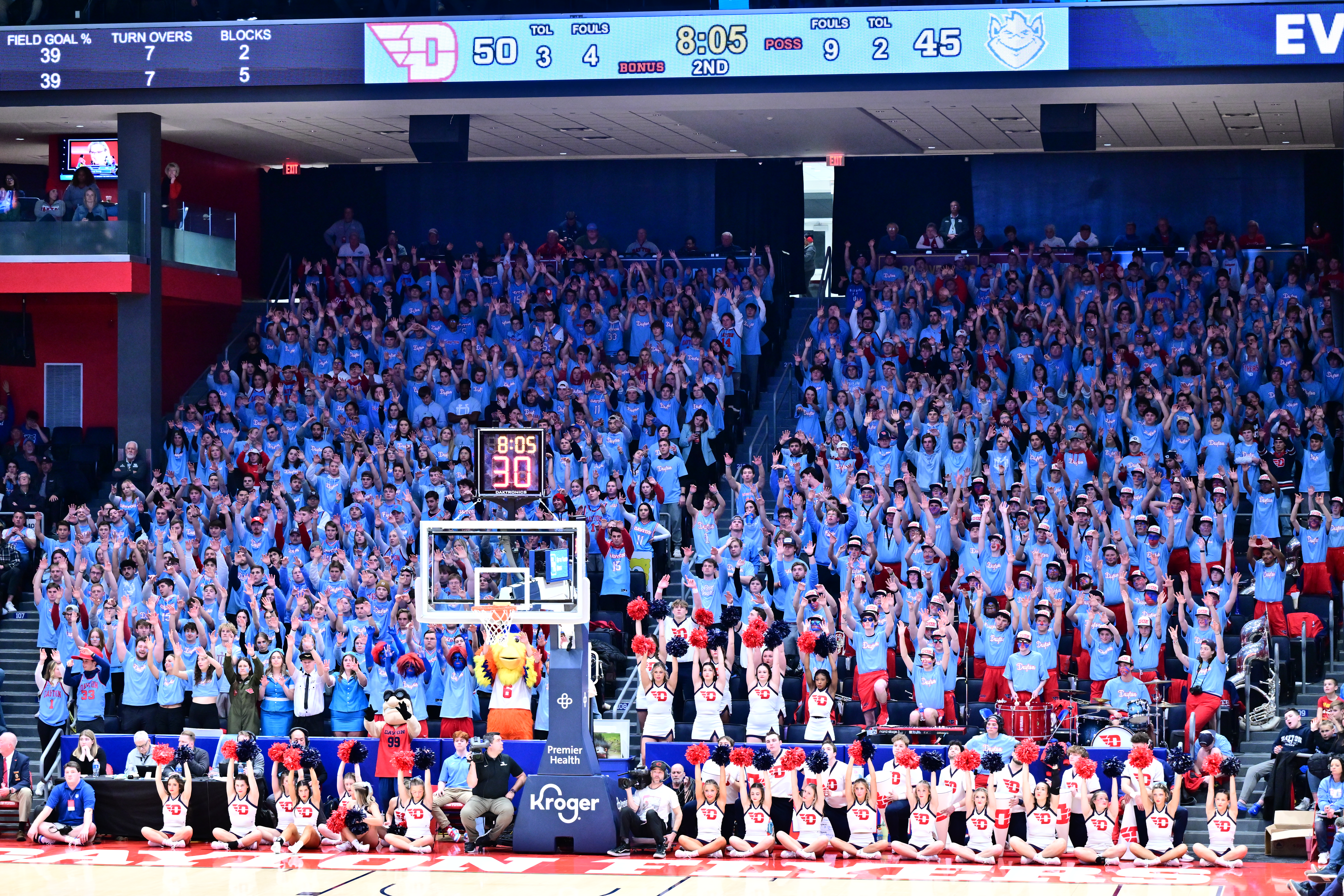

== See also ==
- List of NCAA Division I basketball arenas
