= Sacred Heart Catholic Church (Dayton, Ohio) =

- Sacred Heart Church
- U.S. National Register of Historic Places
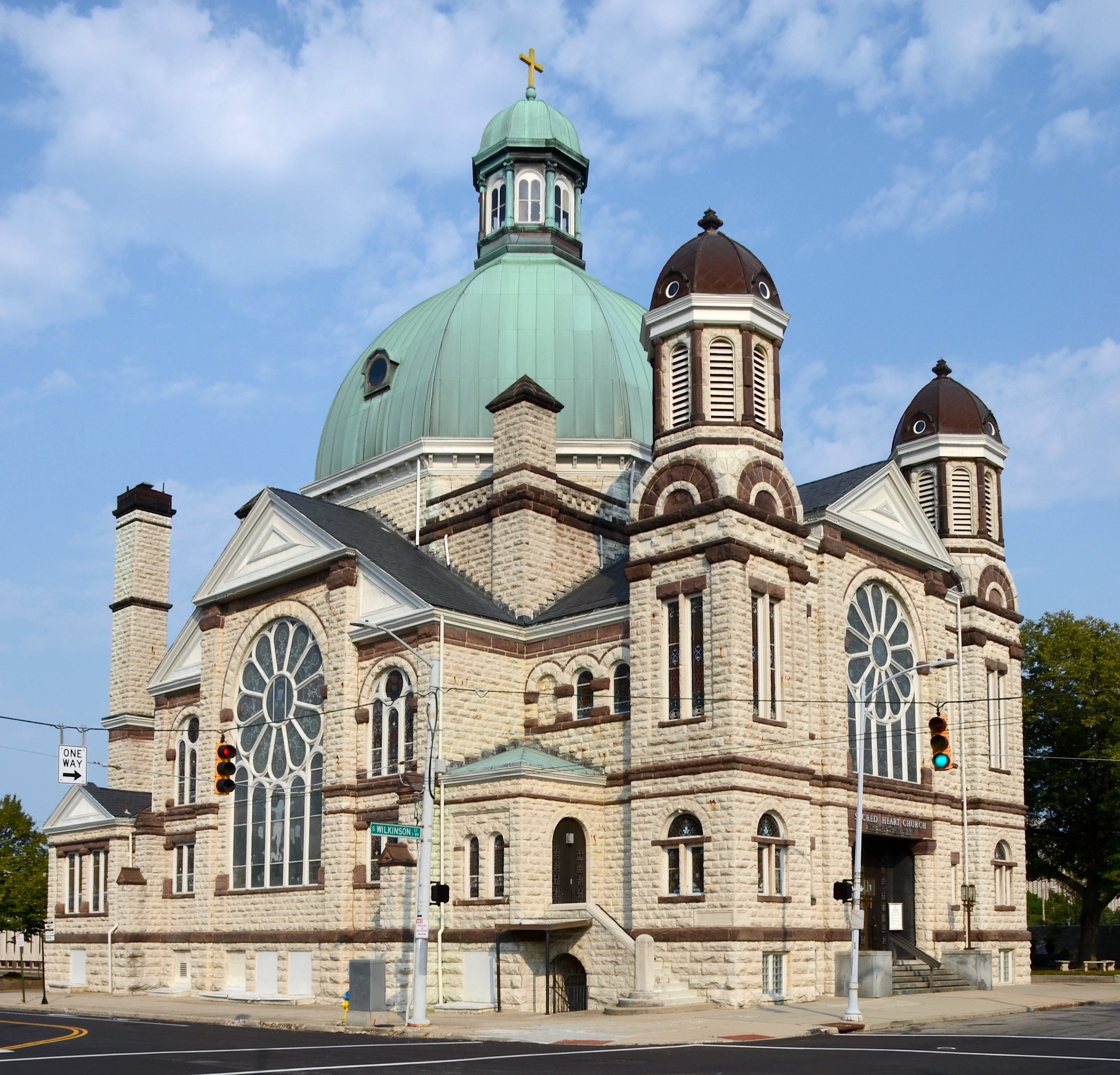
- Viewed from the southeast in 2021

- Location within Ohio Location within the United States
- Location: 217 W. Fourth St., Dayton, Ohio
- Coordinates: 39°45′28″N 84°11′43″W
- Area: Less than 1 acre (0.40 ha)
- Built: 1890
- Architect: Charles Insco Williams
- Architectural style: Romanesque; Queen Anne
- NRHP reference No.: 87001885
- Added to NRHP: October 22, 1987

Sacred Heart Catholic Church is a historic Catholic church building in downtown Dayton, Ohio, United States. Constructed at the end of the nineteenth century for a new parish, it closed in 1996, but was reopened in 2001 when a Vietnamese Catholic group began to use the church. This church building remains significant because of its grand architectural elements, which have led to its designation as a historic site.

== Parish history ==
One of Dayton's oldest Catholic parishes, St. Joseph's Church was established in 1846. The lack of space in that church prompted some of the members to leave in July 1883 and establish Sacred Heart Church; under the leadership of St. Joseph's associate pastor Hugh McDevitt, the congregation rented a meeting hall while waiting for the construction of their building. Land for the present church was purchased for $19,000, and Archbishop William Henry Elder of Cincinnati laid the cornerstone in June 1888. Exterior work was completed in the following year, and by 1893 construction was close enough to completion that the congregation could begin worshipping in their building. The building was consecrated by Bishop Camillus Maes of Covington in November 1895; construction had cost approximately $100,000 ($3,870,000 in current dollar terms), but the parish was able to liquidate its debts by 1903. For many years, the parish flourished, reaching a membership of five hundred families by 1909, but its membership had subsided by 1996. Five years later, a Vietnamese-speaking Catholic parish began using the building.

== Architecture ==
Designed by Charles Insco Williams, Sacred Heart is a limestone building with a limestone foundation, an asphalt roof, and various elements of sandstone and copper; the limestone was quarried locally, while the sandstone was obtained from Berea, Ohio. Constructed in the Romanesque Revival style, but with a prominent octagonal Baroque dome and glazed cupola, towers flank the main entrance, and there are rose windows under the pediments of the front and side. When constructed, the building featured a basement under the 75-foot ceiling, and its general plan was 115 by 92 feet, or 23, 35, and 28m respectively. Grand woodworking, artwork, and chandeliers once filled the interior, but most have been removed; some were destroyed by the raging waters of the Great Flood of 1913, while others were intentionally removed or painted over at later dates.

== Preservation ==
In October 1987, Sacred Heart Church was listed on the National Register of Historic Places due to its distinctive historic architecture. The parish's related rectory was also included in the designation. It is one of five Dayton churches on the Register, along with St. Mary's, St. Adalbert's, and Holy Cross Catholic Churches and First Lutheran Church.

== See also ==
- National Register of Historic Places listings in Dayton, Ohio
