= Dayton Fire Station No. 14 =

- U.S. National Register of Historic Places
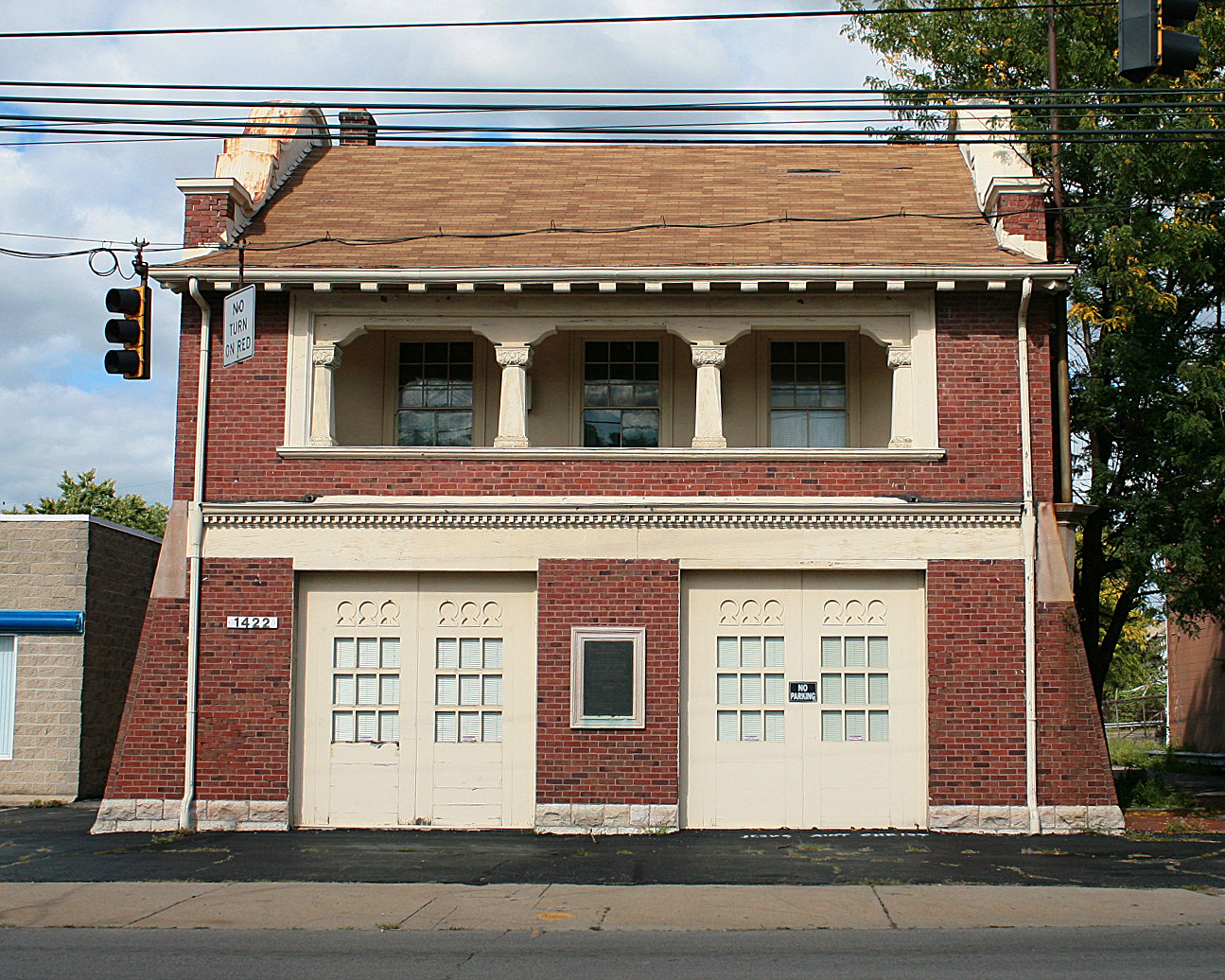
- Dayton Fire Station No. 14

- Location within Ohio Location within the United States
- Location: Dayton, Ohio
- Coordinates: 39°46′38″N 84°12′9″W
- Built: 1901
- Architect: Peters, Burns & Pretzinger
- Architectural style: Mission/Spanish Revival
- NRHP reference No.: 80003172
- Added to NRHP: September 27, 1980

Dayton Fire Station No. 14 is an historic structure at 1422 N. Main St. in Dayton, Ohio. It was added to the National Register of Historic Places on September 27, 1980. It was designed by the Peters, Burns & Pretzinger firm.

== Historic uses ==
Fire station number 14 was built 1901 and is an example of mission style architecture. House number 14 was the last fire house in Dayton to use horse drawn equipment which ceased in 1917.

== See also ==
- Dayton Fire Department Station No. 16
- List of Registered Historic Places in Montgomery County, Ohio
