= Rudolph Pretzinger House =

- U.S. National Register of Historic Places
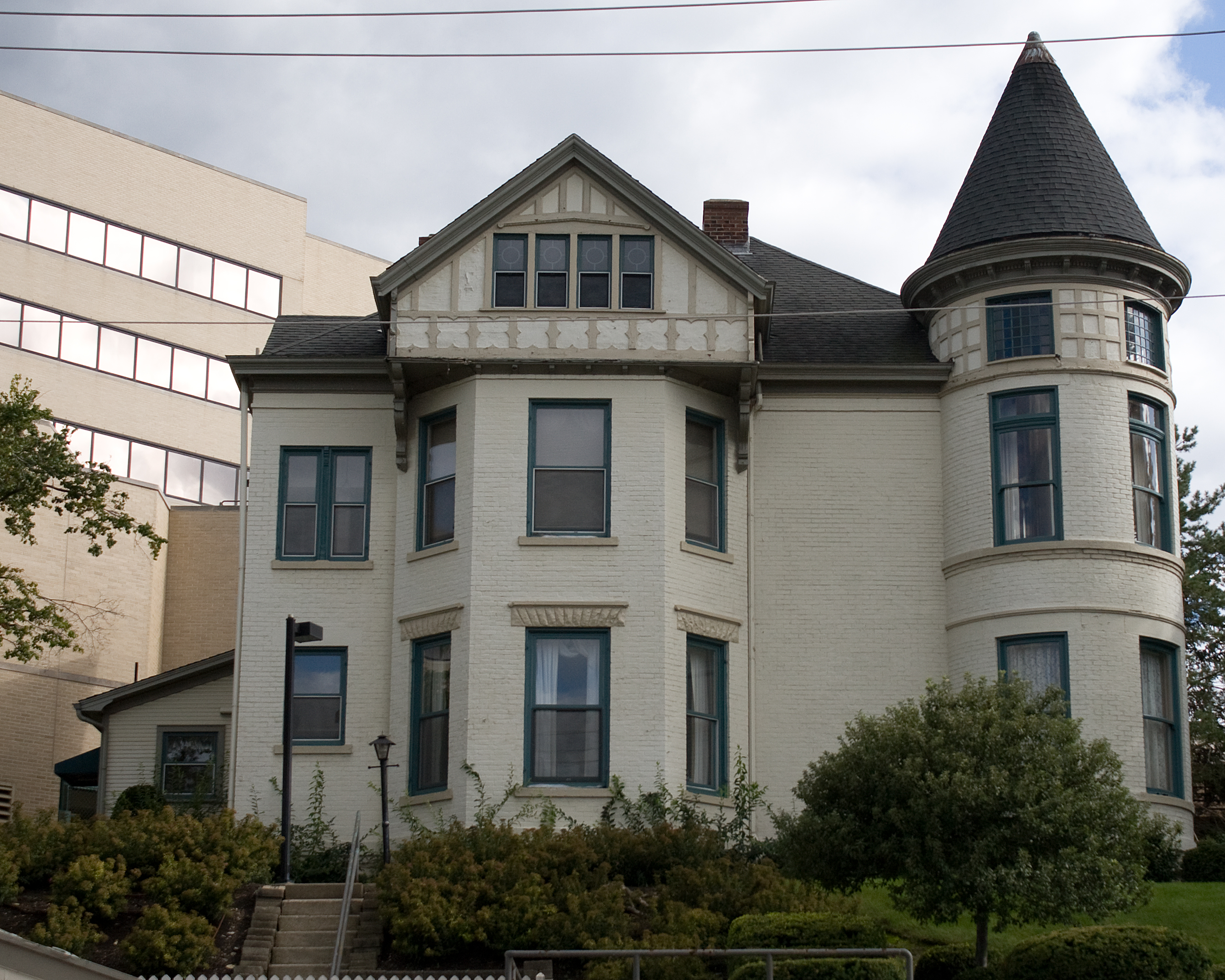
- Northern side of the house

- Location within Ohio Location within the United States
- Location: 908 S. Main St., Dayton, Ohio
- Coordinates: 39°44′46″N 84°11′16″W
- Area: 1 acre (0.40 ha)
- Built: 1889
- Architect: Albert Pretzinger
- Architectural style: Queen Anne
- NRHP reference No.: 79001901
- Added to NRHP: August 24, 1979

The Rudolph Pretzinger House is a historic residence in southern Dayton, Ohio, United States. Constructed in the late nineteenth century for a prominent local pharmacist, it now abuts a city hospital, but it has been named a historic site.

== History ==
Born in 1847, Rudolph Pretzinger emigrated to the United States with his parents at the age of seven and settled in Dayton. The death of his father in 1863 prompted him to undertake man's work, whereupon he earned a pharmacy degree and began a career that culminated in his ownership of a prominent downtown drugstore, a position in which he remained until his 1909 death. Pretzinger's American-born younger brother Albert, one of Dayton's leading architects, designed the house, which was completed in 1889. The property was the focus of a tax lawsuit in 1900: having paid his share of the cost of paving Wyoming Street along his property in 1894, Pretzinger refused to pay for the cost of a sidewalk on the property's Main Street side in 1896, based on his interpretation of an Ohio law forbidding repeated taxation of a property for street improvements within a five-year period. While the Montgomery County court ruled in his favor, the case was reversed on appeal to the circuit court, but Pretzinger was ultimately victorious on appeal to the Supreme Court. Following Pretzinger's death, the property remained the home of his widow.

== Architecture ==
Pretzinger's house is two and a half stories tall, with access through an arched doorway in the center of the facade; although the southern side is longer than the facade, it is pierced by only four windows and no doorways, versus five and one in the facade. A hip roof covers the house, interrupted at points by small gables with miniature Palladian windows. The northwestern corner of the house is a three-story tower with windows on each story, topped with a conical roof. Limestone was used to construct the foundation and for other exterior elements, and the walls are brick and the roof asphalt. Together, these elements lend the house a Queen Anne appearance.

== Historic site ==
In 1979, the Rudolph Pretzinger House was listed on the National Register of Historic Places, qualifying because of its historically significant architecture. While the house remains at the intersection of Main and Apple Streets, as it was during Pretzinger's lifetime, the property no longer extends south to Wyoming; most of his land is now the site of Miami Valley Hospital. Two other National Register-listed locations lie within a few minutes' walk: the former Eagles Building to the north, and the exposition hall at the county fairgrounds across the street to the southwest.

== See also ==
- National Register of Historic Places listings in Dayton, Ohio
