= Eva Best =

American author (1851–1925)

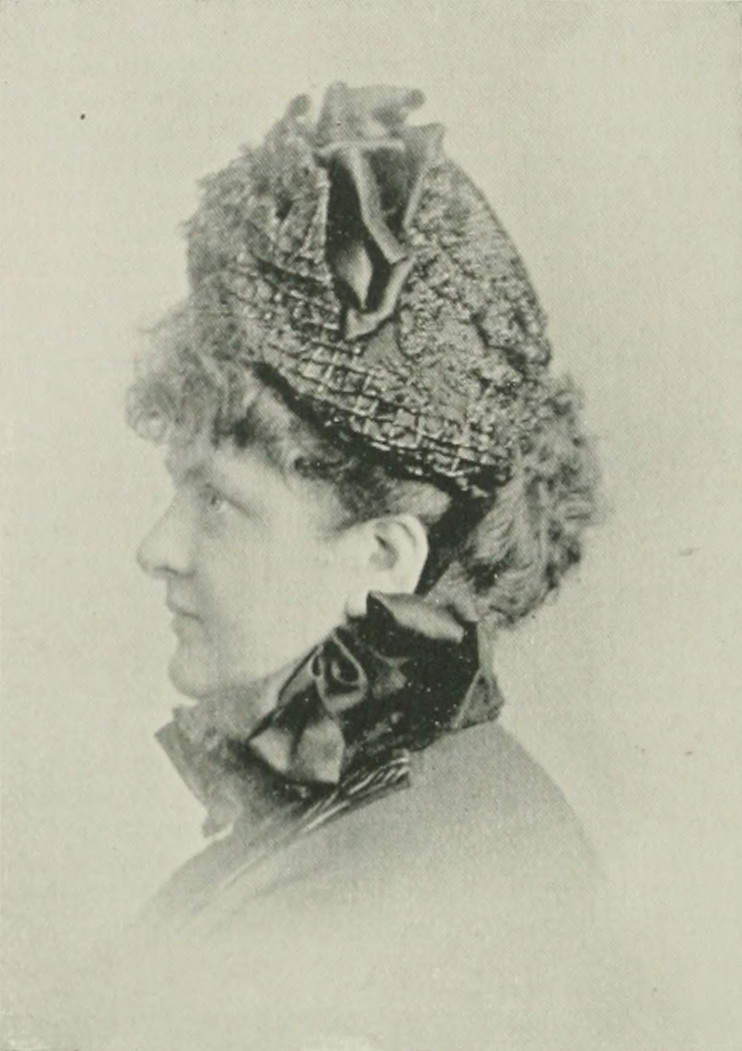
- Portrait photo from A Woman of the Century
- Born: Eva Williams; December 19, 1851; Cincinnati, Ohio, U.S.
- Died: April 17, 1925 (aged 73); Dayton, Ohio, U.S.
- Resting place: Woodland Cemetery and Arboretum, Dayton, Ohio
- Occupations: writer; editor; music composer
- Spouse: William H. Best (m. 1869)
- Children: 2
- Relatives: Charles Insco Williams (brother); William I. Buchanan (brother-in-law)
- Writing career
- Pen name: Saturn
- Language: English; dialect
- Genres: stories; poetry; dramas

Eva Best (née Williams; pen name, Saturn; 1851–1925) was an American story writer, poet, music composer, dramatist, and painter. She worked as a newspaper editor. She wrote a great deal in dialect. Best was among the first persons to recognize the poetry of Paul Laurence Dunbar and was influential in bringing him before the public. In his youth, Dunbar was an elevator attendant in the same building in which Best's father conducted an architect's office, and she became acquainted with the youth and his literary endeavors through seeing him in her father's building.

== Early life ==
Eva Williams was born in Cincinnati, Ohio, on December 19, 1851. She was the eldest daughter of John Insco Williams and Mrs. Mary Williams, who moved to Chicago, Illinois. Her father was an artist and painted the first bible panorama ever exhibited in the United States. Her mother is also an artist of merit and a writer of verse and prose. Eva's brother, Charles Insco Williams, was an artist and architect. A sister, Lulu, married William I. Buchanan.

== Career ==
Best started her literary career as a poet. "The Beautiful Thought", "Love and Hate", "A Promised Day", and "Thou Art" are included in The New Cycle (1899), while "The Power of Thought" was included in the Bible Review (1905).

She began writing for the papers in 1871, encouraged by William D. Bickham, of the Dayton Journal (now, Dayton Daily News). In 1872, she began contributing to the Cincinnati Saturday Night, and afterward to The Cincinnati Times-Star, under the nom de plume of "Saturn". She then wrote for Godey's Magazine, for Arthur's Lady's Home Magazine, and for Peterson's Magazine. Her first short story appeared in one of Frank Leslie's periodicals. That was followed by stories in other publications. In 1882, her services were sought by the editor of the Detroit Free Press, with Best becoming the editor of the household department of that paper. She was also a regular contributor to Ansel Nash Kellogg's Newspaper Company. In 1900, Best joined The New Cycle where her editorial work focused on "The Home Circle" department; she also provided poems and short stories.

"My past has placed me where I am today and my tomorrow will find me where I have earned the right to be." (Eva Best, 1926)

Best wrote several dramas. The first, An American Princess, ran at least six seasons. A comedy drama, Sands of Egypt, was in the hands of Miss Elisabeth Marbury, of New York City. A Rhine Crystal was being used by Miss Floy Crowell, a New England artist. Best's other plays, The Little Banshee and Gemini, the former in Irish dialect, the latter a two-part character piece, were written for Miss Jennie Calef. In all these plays the music, dances, ballads, and incidental scores were distinctively original. In her dramatic work, she composed both the songs and the music with which her dramas were interspersed.

Best wrote several ballads. One of her peculiar advantages in writing stories was her ability to sketch such illustrations as she was required to visualize her thoughts. She devoted some attention to art. She often painted landscapes, flower pieces, and fruits, and was also extremely apt and original in design.

== Personal life ==
In 1869, she married William H. Best, of Dayton, Ohio, and made her home in that city. They had two children, a son and a daughter.

Eva Best died in Dayton, Ohio, on April 17, 1925, after being ill for four months. Burial was in that city's Woodland Cemetery and Arboretum.

== Selected works ==
=== Dramas ===
- An American Princess, 1886
- Sands of Egypt
- A Rhine Crystal
- The Little Banshee
- Gemini

=== Short stories ===
- "A Voice of the Silence", 1900
- "The Wise Man and the Sea Urchins", 1900

=== Poems ===
- "The Beautiful Thought", 1899
- "Love and Hate", 1899
- "A Promised Day", 1899
- "Thou Art". 1899
- "The Power of Thought", 1905
- "Alphabetic Hints", 1900
- "Do Unto Others", 1900
- "Resolves", 1900
- "The Awakening", 1900
- "The Kingdom of Heaven", 1900
- "The Glorious Dawn", 1900
- "The Wonderful Power", 1900
- "When Father Laughs", 1900
