= Dayton Fire Department Station No. 16 =

- U.S. National Register of Historic Places
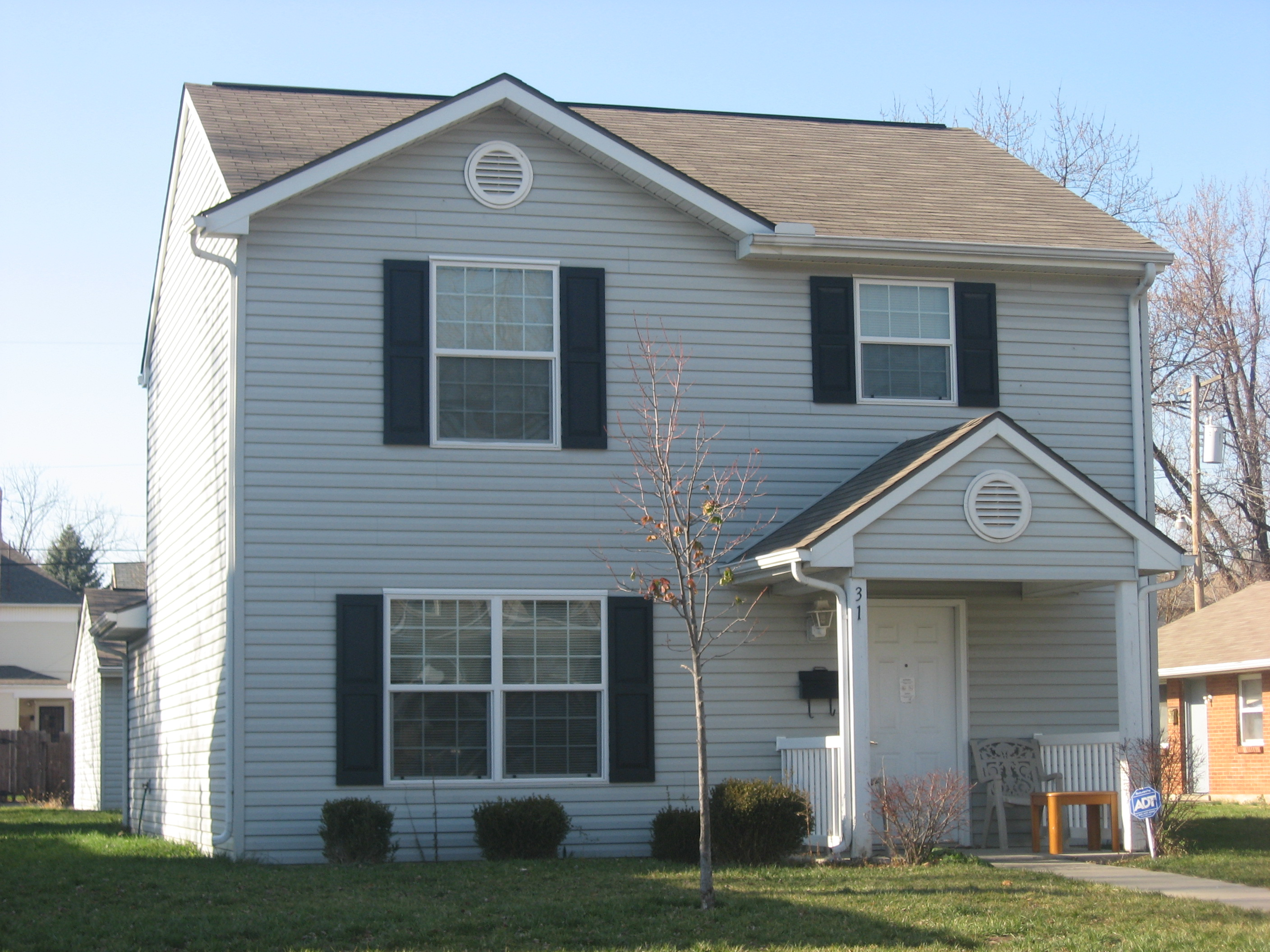
- Site of the fire station

- Location within Ohio Location within the United States
- Location: 31 S. Jersey St., Dayton, Ohio
- Coordinates: 39°45′53″N 84°9′12″W
- Area: 0.5 acres (0.20 ha)
- Built: 1909; 117 years ago
- NRHP reference No.: 80003171
- Added to NRHP: May 23, 1980

The Dayton Fire Department Station No. 16 was a historic fire station on the near east side of Dayton, Ohio, United States. An architectural landmark constructed in the early twentieth century, it was named a historic site seventy years after being built, but it is no longer extant.

Built of brick on a brick foundation, the station was covered with an asbestos roof and featured elements of wood and limestone. Most of the building was two-and-a-half stories tall and covered with a hip roof, although aberrations included a polygonal southeastern corner and a tower on the southern side. Three fire doors composed a significant part of the facade. Constructed in 1909, the station was built at a time when Dayton's city government was building numerous fire stations in high architectural styles; Station 16's most prominent details derived from the Neo-Renaissance and Gothic Revival styles. Among these details were the pointed arched doorways, a cornice with extensive bracketing, and elaborately shaped dormer windows; the building's overall plan was an unexceptional rectangle. The identity of its designer is unknown.

In 1980, Fire Station 16 was listed on the National Register of Historic Places; it qualified for inclusion because of its distinctive architecture, which surpassed that of virtually every other extant fire station in the city. Despite this designation, the station has since been removed, and a recently constructed house occupies its place.

== See also ==
- Dayton Fire Station No. 14
- National Register of Historic Places listings in Dayton, Ohio
