= Olive Branch High School (New Carlisle, Ohio) =

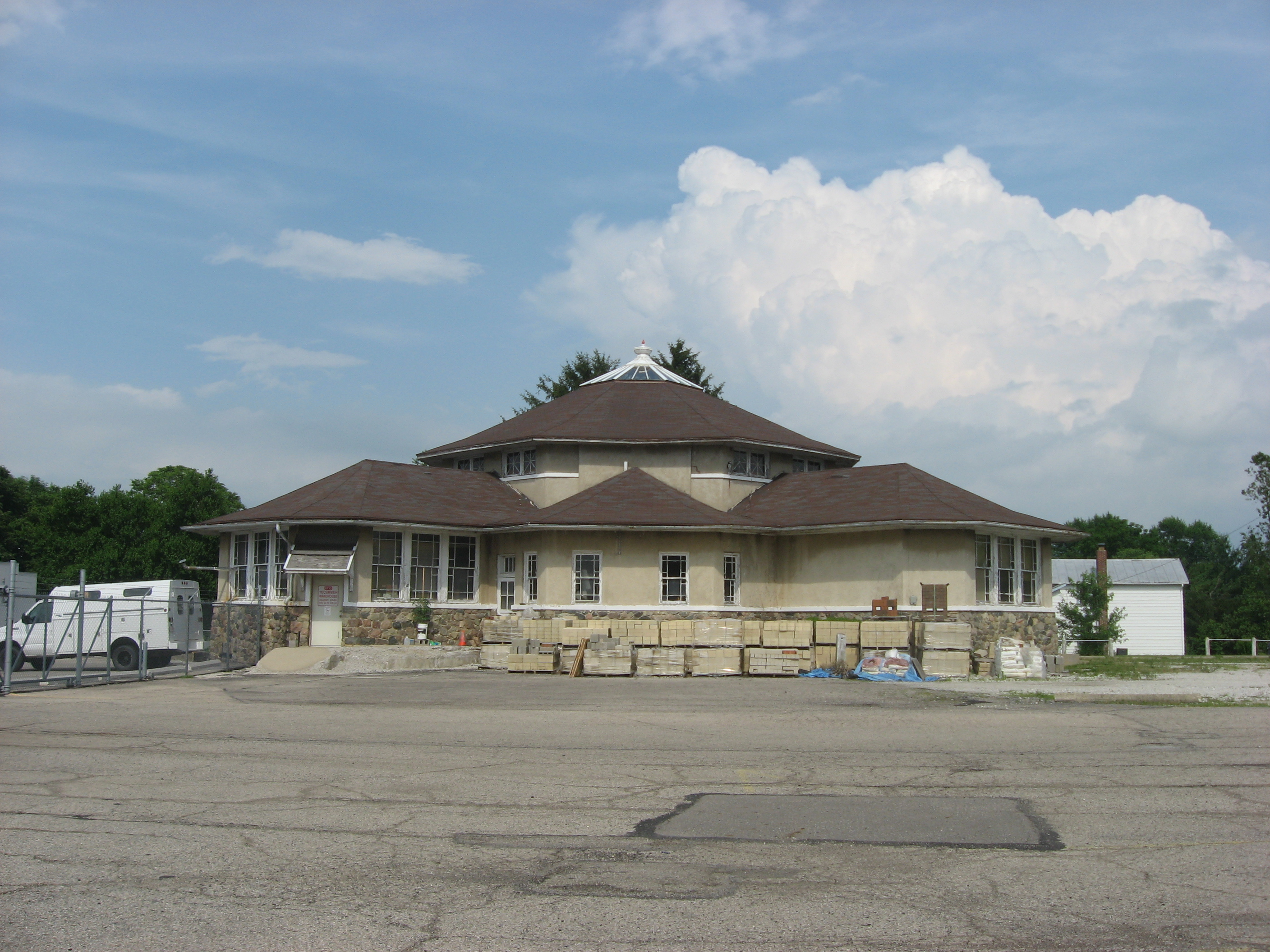
- The "little round" building which housed Olive Branch High School from 1914 to 1928.

Location
- 9520 West National Road; New Carlisle, (Clark County), Ohio 45344; United States
- 39.912713°N 83.996505°W

Information
- Type: Public, Coeducational high school
- Established: 1880
- Closed: 1952
- Grades: 9-12
- Architect: Charles Insco Williams

Olive Branch High School was a public high school near New Carlisle, Ohio.

== History ==
In 1873, a brick structure known as "No. 3" was built to house the Olive Branch School, for grades 4 through 8.

In 1878, the Legislature of Ohio passed a law authorizing township Boards of Education to establish a school of higher grade than a common school. A decision was quickly made to create Olive Branch High School, but due to lack of funds, the new school wasn't established until October 1880, when one room of the existing Olive Branch School was put into service for a high school class headed by teacher Robert H. Taylor. Courses taught at the school included Latin, Algebra, Geometry, Science, and others. The first class started with five students, but grew to seven by the time its members graduated from grade 11 in 1883.

In 1884, the school became a four-year institution with the addition of a grade 12, so the pupils who graduated in 1883 came back for another year—with a new teacher, as Robert Taylor left after his third year—and graduated again with the class of 1884. That same year, a Superintendent position was created and filled by Mr. Taylor's brother, W.S. Taylor.

In 1886, a second teacher was hired, but the faculty was reduced back down to one teacher the following year. The building was also expanded around this time.

By 1900, the Olive Branch School building was overcrowded and in disrepair. Some of the repairs mandated by the State Inspector were completed that year, and the Bethel Township Board of Education spent the next six years discussing whether to continue repairs or to construct a new building. Construction of a new building was approved in 1907, and bonds were issued to raise the $30,000 needed to build the new school.

The new building was completed in 1908, and all the students were moved to it. This structure, designed in the Craftsman style by architect Charles Insco Williams, was the first to be named Olive Branch High School, although it also still housed the lower grades of sub-district 3. Known locally as the "little round school house", "little round building" or "little round O.B.", this building had a unique circular design with four classrooms that pointed inward to face a central cafeteria and gymnasium. The building was destroyed when a boiler in the basement caught fire on November 10, 1913. Classes were held in a barn until a replacement building was finished in December 1914, at a cost of just under $15,000, for which $7,000 in bonds were issued earlier that year. Built on the same foundation, it was identical to the original building, but had doors added to each classroom so students could easily exit the building in case of fire.

From 1910 to 1916, the school had two teachers. In 1916, a third teacher was added in order to comply with a new state law requiring high schools to have three faculty in order to retain its standing as a 'first-grade' high school. At the time, Olive Branch was one of only two rural schools in the state to retain its standing.

A Smith–Hughes agriculture course was added in 1922.

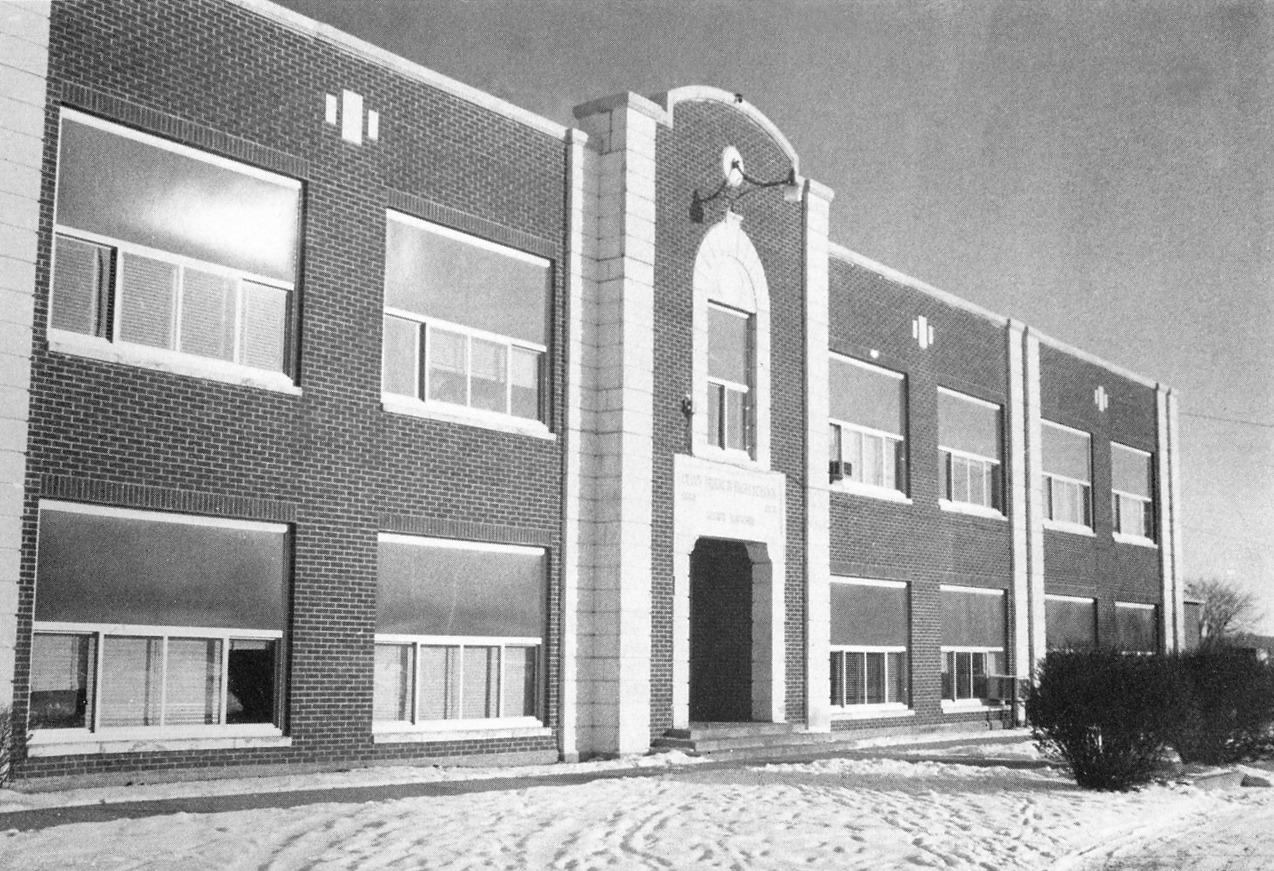
The 1928–2007 brick building used for Olive Branch High School and Olive Branch Middle School, as it appeared in 1984.

In 1928, a new, larger brick building was constructed to house Olive Branch High School on land adjacent to the "little round" school. In 1952, Olive Branch High School closed and its grade 10–12 students enrolled in the newly completed Tecumseh High School, one hundred meters away.

The brick building which last housed Olive Branch High School then became Olive Branch Junior High School (grades 7 through 9), and in 1981 became Olive Branch Middle School (grades 6 through 8), before being demolished and replaced by Tecumseh Middle School in 2007.

Meanwhile, in the 1950s and early 1960s, the "little round" building was used for overflow, temporarily housing classes from Tecumseh High School. In 1963, the building was used as an overflow elementary school, and then for art classes. In 1972, it ceased housing classes, and since then the well-maintained building has been used for storage. The building was placed on the National Register of Historic Places in July 2009 and was rededicated at a ceremony in January 2010. As of 2010, funds were being sought to restore the building as a museum and board office.

== Notable alumni ==
- Benjamin G. Lamme (class of 1883), Chief Electrical Engineer for Westinghouse Electric Corporation
- Bertha Lamme (class of 1889), the first woman to earn an electrical engineering degree

== See also ==
- National Register of Historic Places listings in Clark County, Ohio
