= Dayton Daily News Building =

- U.S. National Register of Historic Places
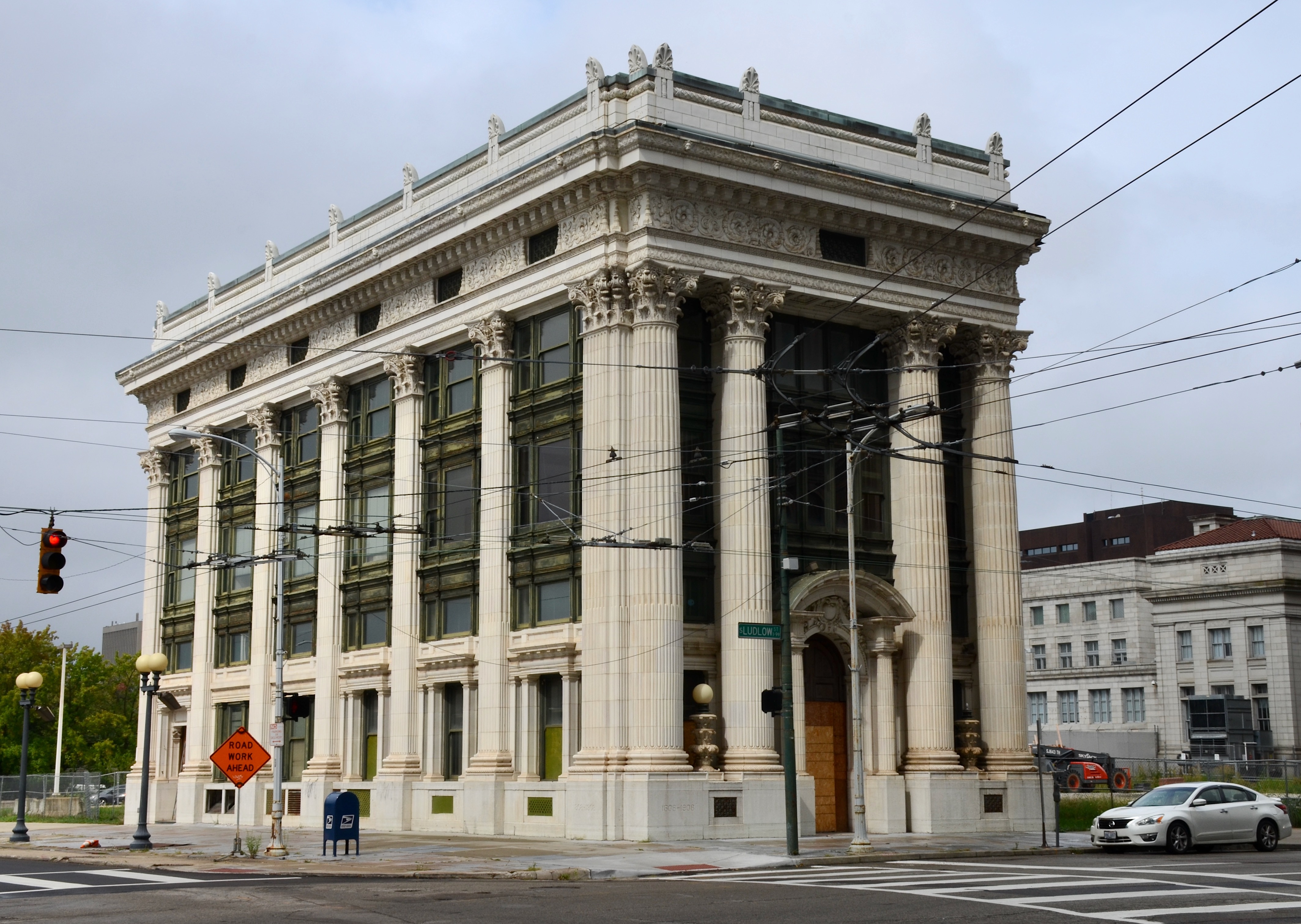
- Front and southern side

- Location within Ohio Location within the United States
- Location: 4th and Ludlow Sts., Dayton, Ohio
- Coordinates: 39°45′28″N 84°11′37″W
- Area: 0.3 acres (0.12 ha)
- Built: 1910
- Architect: Albert A. Pretzinger
- Architectural style: Beaux-Arts
- NRHP reference No.: 78002144
- Added to NRHP: November 30, 1978

The Dayton Daily News Building is a historic structure located at the corner of 4th and Ludlow Streets in Dayton, Ohio. It was designed by architect Albert Pretzinger for Dayton Daily News founder James M. Cox. According to Cox's autobiography, he was turned down for a loan by a local banker who told him "Newspapers have never been known to earn money. Of course we can't accommodate you." After being turned down for a bank loan to start the paper, Cox asked Pretzinger to "build him a damn bank" so it was modeled after the Knickerbocker Trust building in New York City. Among the most significant components of the three-story building are those surrounding the entrance: three bays wide, the facade features a set of Corinthian columns, a set of fluted columns in the Doric order that form a grand frontispiece around the entrance, and a partial pediment with a cornice supported by cornucopiae. Its walls are built of a mixture of wood and granite.

The building was erected between 1908 and 1910 and expanded in the 1920s, 1950s and 1970s. The 1908 building was remodeled in 1989. On November 30, 1978, it was added to the National Register of Historic Places. In April 2007, the newspaper's editorial and business offices moved to the former NCR Building 31 at 1611 S. Main St. on Dayton's south side, near the University of Dayton campus.

The newer portions of the Dayton Daily News building were demolished in 2013. Only the 1908 building on the corner remains. The Schwind Building at 27 Ludlow, built in 1913, was imploded on August 17, 2013, as part of the demolition process.

== See also ==
- National Register of Historic Places listings in Dayton, Ohio
