= Twin Towers, Dayton, Ohio =

Coordinates: 39°45′10″N 84°10′04″W

Twin Towers is a neighborhood of Dayton, Ohio, United States. It is bounded by Wayne Avenue, Wyoming Street, Steve Whalen Boulevard and the U.S. Route 35 expressway.

== History ==
Twin Towers was known for its large German and Jewish populations. It developed a prominent business district and became well known throughout the city of Dayton. Twin Towers has also played a key part in World War II when there was a mass movement of Appalachian peoples who came to work in Twin Towers' many war factories and industries. Later, in the 1960s, U.S. Route 35 was built through the city and many Appalachian people were displaced while massive amounts of shops, homes, and larger stores were forced to close.

The Romanesque style St. Mary's Catholic Church (Two Towers' namesake) was built in 1906, and was placed on the National Register of Historic Places in 1983.
