= First Lutheran Church (Dayton, Ohio) =

Historic church in Ohio, United States

- U.S. National Register of Historic Places
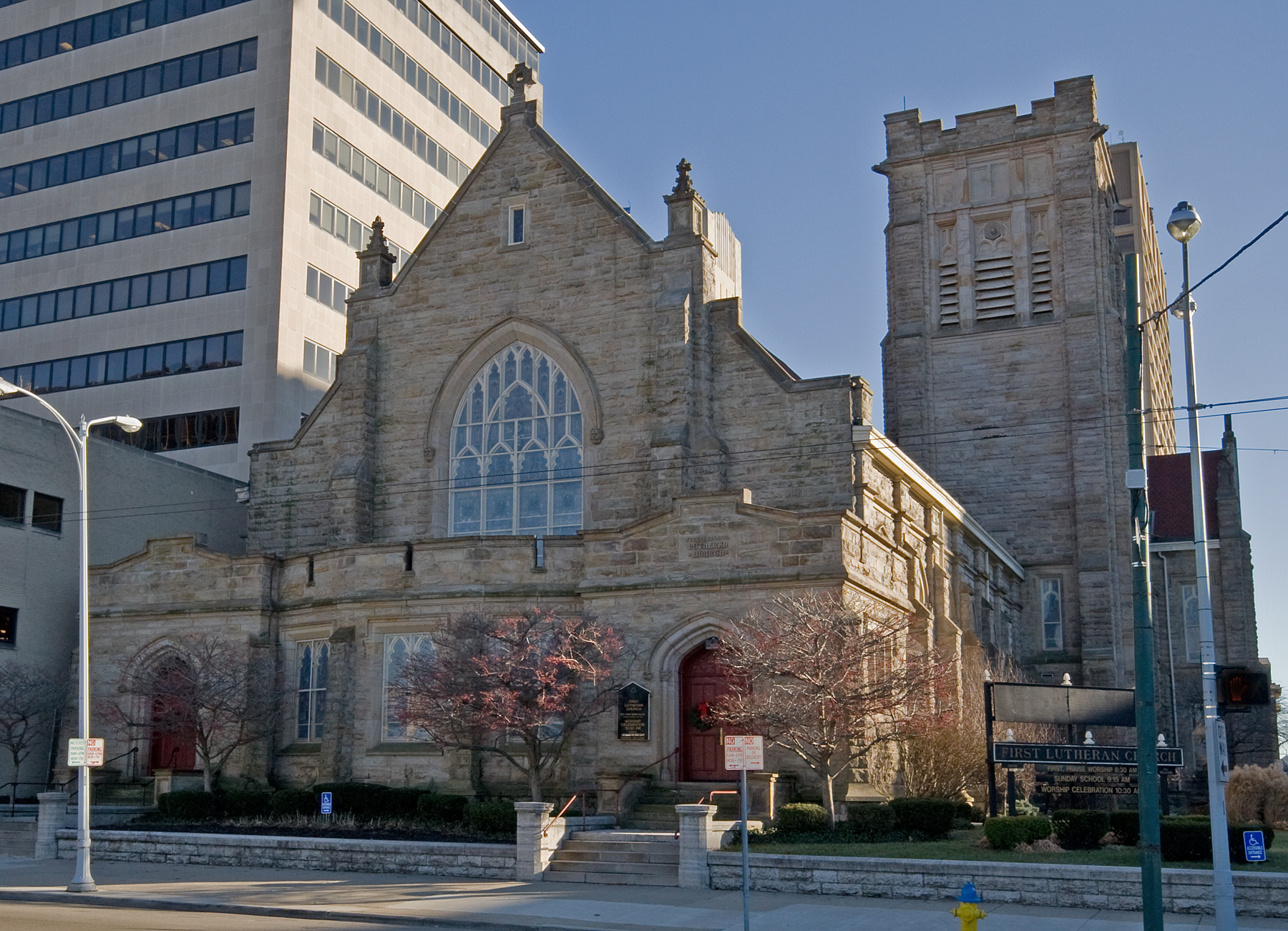
- Front of the church

- Location within Ohio Location within the United States
- Location: 138 W. 1st St., Dayton, Ohio
- Coordinates: 39°45′41″N 84°11′45″W
- Area: Less than 1 acre (0.40 ha)
- Built: 1907
- Architect: Peters, Burns, and Pretzinger
- Architectural style: Gothic Revival
- NRHP reference No.: 83002011
- Added to NRHP: March 29, 1983

First Lutheran Church is a historic Lutheran church in downtown Dayton, Ohio, United States. Constructed in the 1900s for a large congregation, its architecture includes numerous elements seen in older grand churches, and it has been named a historic site.

== Congregational history ==
First Lutheran was established in mid-1839. After a time of worshipping in a store owned by a charter member, the congregation erected their first church building in what is now downtown Dayton. Although several different buildings have housed the congregation since 1839, all have been located in the downtown area. It has parented several other Dayton-area Lutheran churches: the members planted six congregations at different times, and political issues related to the Civil War caused an acrimonious split in 1864, after which the minority formed a separate congregation.

Once a massive congregation, with approximately 2,500 names on the roll in 1948, the congregation has experienced challenges from suburbanization. According to denominational statistics, the congregation's membership fell from 457 to 78 between 2000 and 2013, and average attendance at worship services fell from 125 to 70, although the latter number represented an increase from averages in the thirties from 2007 to 2011.

== Church building ==
Construction on the congregation's two-story original building began in 1841, two years after the congregation was organized, although it was not ready for worship until more a year later, and the second story was only added three years after the first story was completed. The congregation later erected several other buildings elsewhere downtown, culminating in the construction of the current building in 1906.

The present building, a Gothic Revival structure, is a rusticated stone building designed by Peters, Burns, and Pretzinger. Its general appearance was intended to resemble that of the most prominent Lutheran churches in Europe, so the architects included stained glass portraits of certain of the Twelve Apostles and Four Evangelists, traditional details such as label stops with figureheads, and a painted ceiling with visible structural elements. Among the most prominent aspects of the overall design are a central tower 100 feet (30 m) tall, tall but thin ogive windows, and the use of stone with multicolored veins for the exterior walls. It is the only extant downtown church in the Gothic Revival style.

== Preservation ==
In early 1983, First Lutheran Church was listed on the National Register of Historic Places, qualifying because of its historically significant architecture. It is one of five Dayton churches with this distinction; the others, all Catholic, are scattered among various city neighborhoods, and only Sacred Heart is located downtown.
