= Engine Company 16 Fire Station =

- U.S. National Register of Historic Places
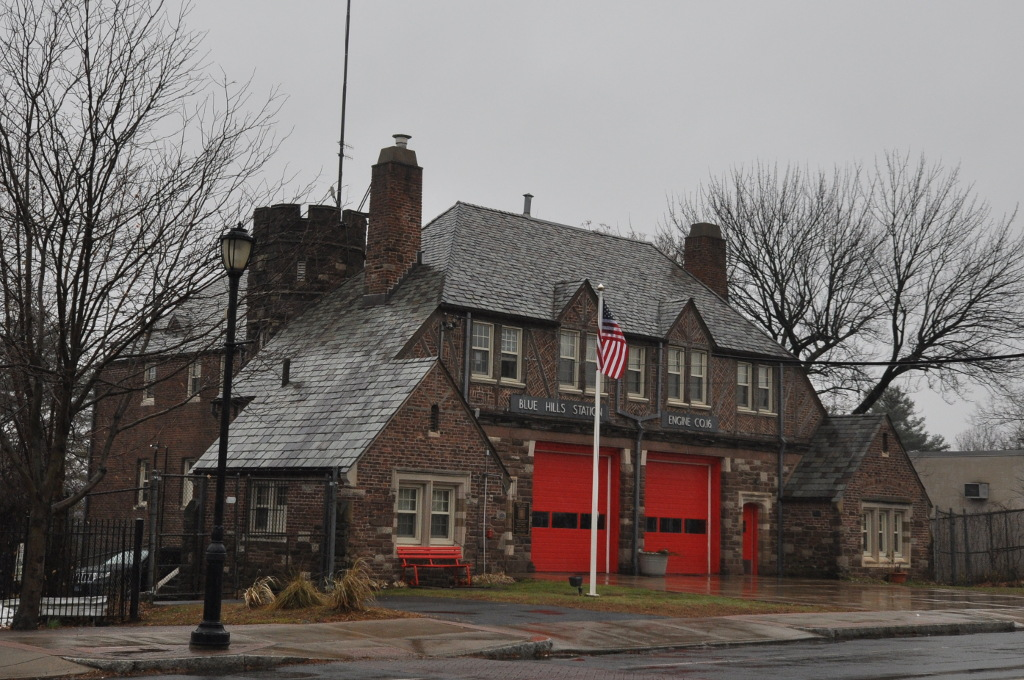

- Location within Connecticut Location within the United States
- Location: 636 Blue Hills Avenue, Hartford, Connecticut
- Coordinates: 41°48′15″N 72°41′44″W
- Area: 0.4 acres (0.16 ha)
- Built: 1927
- Architect: Ebbets & Frid
- Architectural style: Tudor Revival
- MPS: Firehouses of Hartford MPS
- NRHP reference No.: 89000021
- Added to NRHP: March 2, 1989

The Engine Company 16 Fire Station, also known as the Blue Hills Fire Station, is located at 636 Blue Hills Avenue in Hartford, Connecticut. Built in 1928, it is one of the city's most architecturally distinctive fire stations, a Tudor Revival structure designed by the local firm of Ebbets & Frid. The building was listed on the National Register of Historic Places on March 2, 1989. It continues to serve its original function, housing Engine Company 16 of the Hartford Fire Department.

== Description and history ==
Engine Company 16 is located on the east side of Blue Hills Avenue in Hartford's northern Blue Hills neighborhood, opposite its junction with Harold Street. It is a two-story structure, with a steel frame faced in brick with stone trim, with Tudor Revival styling. It is covered by a hip roof, with chimneys at either end. It has two equipment bays at the center, flanked by pedestrian entrances, and nearly symmetrical projecting side wings. The left side wing has two sash windows, while that on the right has three. The interior is simply decorated, with a tiled apparatus room on the first floor and a dormitory above, with two brass poles.

Engine Company 16 was organized by the city in 1928, the year this building was constructed. It was designed by the Hartford firm of Ebbets and Frid. It is remarkable among the city's fire stations for its rich exterior detailing, and its Tudor Revival styling, which is not found on other stations. The area around the station was at the time of its construction a somewhat sparsely built residential area, that has since been developed more densely.

== See also ==
- National Register of Historic Places listings in Hartford, Connecticut
