= Brooks House =

Brooks House may refer to:

- Brooks-Hughes House, Phenix City, Alabama
- Brooks House (Searcy, Arkansas)
- Paul Brooks House, Safford, Arizona, listed on the National Register of Historic Places (NRHP)
- Jonathan Warner House, Chester, Connecticut, also known as Warner-Brooks House
- Brooks House (Middlesboro, Kentucky), listed on the NRHP
- Solomon Neill Brooks House, Shepherdsville, Kentucky
- Luther Brooks House, Cambridge, Massachusetts
- Daniel Brooks House, Lincoln, Massachusetts
- Jonathan Brooks House, Medford, Massachusetts
- Shepherd Brooks Estate, Medford, Massachusetts
- Charles Brooks House, Medford, Massachusetts
- Francis Brooks House, Reading, Massachusetts
- James H. Brooks House, Somerville, Massachusetts
- John Brooks House, Worcester, Massachusetts
- Harold C. Brooks House, Marshall, Michigan, listed on the NRHP
- Wright-Brooks House, Marshall, Michigan, listed on the NRHP
- Brooks Farm, Troy, Michigan
- Eastcliff (mansion), St. Paul, Minnesota, also known as the Edward and Markell Brooks House
- Samuel Brooks House (Cornwall, New York)
- Samuel Brooks House (Massachusetts), Concord, Massachusetts
- James Brooks House (Dayton, Ohio)
- J. Wesley Brooks House, Greenwood, South Carolina
- Brooks Brothers Home, Sioux Falls, South Dakota, listed on the NRHP
- Dr. Beauregard Martin Brooks House, Bath Springs, Tennessee
- R.M. Brooks General Store and Residence, Rugby, Tennessee, listed on the NRHP
- Rueben Brooks Farmstead, Elizabethton, Tennessee, listed on the NRHP
- Wilks Brooks House, Memphis, Tennessee
- William and Blanche Brooks House, Forney, Texas, listed on the NRHP
- Jennie Brooks House, Bastrop, Texas, listed on the NRHP
- Brooks-Wilbarger House, Bastrop, Texas, listed on the NRHP
- Samuel Wallace Brooks House, Brownsville, Texas, listed on the NRHP
- Brooks-Brown House, Dickinson, Virginia
- Brooks House (Brattleboro, Vermont)
- Kenneth and Edna Brooks House, Spokane, Washington, listed on the NRHP
- Brooks Mansion, Washington, D.C.

== See also ==
- James Brooks House (disambiguation)
- Samuel Brooks House (disambiguation)
- Brook House (disambiguation)
- Brook Farm (disambiguation)
