= Sam Brooks =

Sam, Sammy or Samuel Brooks may refer to:

== Sportspeople ==
- Sam Brooks (rugby league) (born 1993), Scotland international rugby league footballer
- Sammy Brooks (footballer) (1890–1960), British footballer
- Sam Brooks, a member of the Cambridge rowing crew in The Boat Race 2002
- Sammy Brooks, freestyle and collegiate wrestler, represented the United States of America in Freestyle wrestling world cup 2019

== Politicians ==
- Samuel Brooks (politician) (1793–1849), American-born merchant and Canadian politician
- Sam Brooks (politician), Botswana politician
- Samuel Wood Brooks (1840–1915), Australian politician and missionary

== Others ==
- Sam Brooks (dramatist), New Zealand playwright and dramatist
- Sammy Brooks (1891–1951), American film actor
- Samuel Brooks (cotton manufacturer) (1793–1864), English cotton manufacturer and banker
- Samuel Palmer Brooks (1863–1931), president of Baylor University
- Samuel Wallace Brooks (1829–1903), American architect
- Sam Brooks, guitarist associated with Blind Willie Walker
- Samuel Hamilton Brooks, after whom the Memphis Brooks Museum of Art was named

== See also ==
- Samuel Brooks House (disambiguation)
- Sammy Brookes, English footballer
- Samuel Brooke (1575–1631), English playwright, chaplain and professor of divinity
- Sambrook (disambiguation)
