= Daniel Brooks (disambiguation) =

Daniel Brooks or Dan Brooks can refer to:

== People ==
- Dan Brooks (born 1951), former American football coach and player.
- Daniel Brooks (1958–2023), Canadian theatre director, actor, and playwright
- Daniel Brooks (golfer) (born 1987), English professional golfer
- Daniel R. Brooks, Canadian professor of evolutionary biology
- Danny Brooks (born 1951), Canadian musician and author

== Places ==
- Daniel Brooks House, an historic First Period house located in Lincoln, Massachusetts, built c. 1695 by Daniel Brooks
