= Brook Farm (disambiguation) =

Brook Farm may refer to:

in the United Kingdom

- Brook Farm (Thornton-Cleveleys, Lancashire), a farmhouse

in the United States

(by state)

- Brook Farm, the site of a utopian transcendentalist community in the West Roxbury neighborhood of Boston, Massachusetts, listed on the NRHP in Massachusetts
- Brook Farm (Skaneateles, New York), listed on the NRHP in New York
- Brook Farm (Cavendish, Vermont), listed on the NRHP in Vermont

== See also ==
- Brook House (disambiguation)
- Brooks House (disambiguation)
- Brooks Farm, Troy, Michigan, listed on the NRHP in Oakland County, Michigan
- Brook Hill Farm, Forest, Virginia, listed on the NRHP in Bedford County, Virginia
