= James Brooks House =

James Brooks House may refer to:

- James H. Brooks House, Somerville, Massachusetts, listed on the NRHP in Massachusetts
- James Brooks House (Dayton, Ohio), listed on the NRHP in Ohio

== See also ==
- Brooks House (disambiguation)
