= Dr. Jefferson A. Walters House =

- U.S. National Register of Historic Places
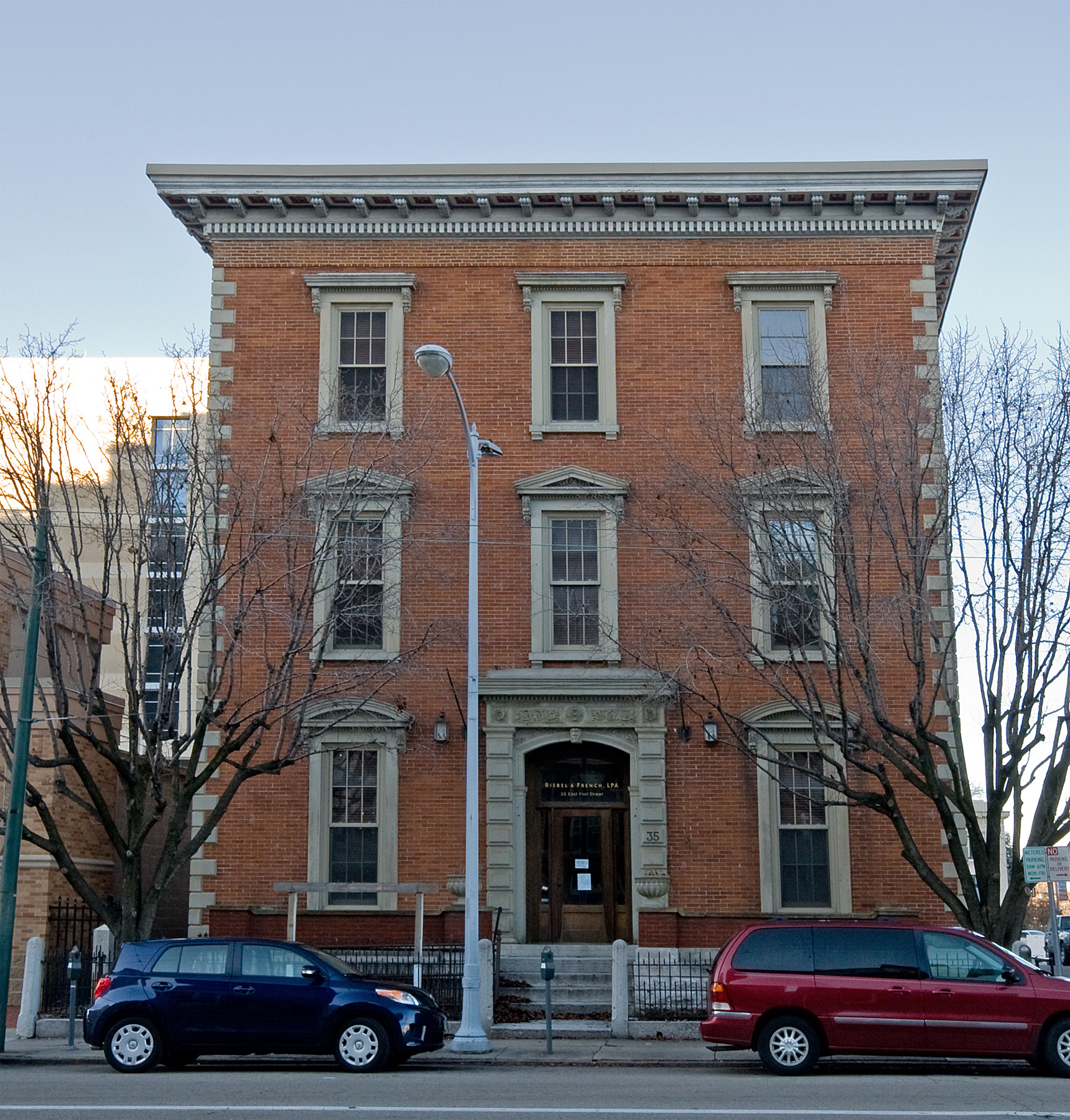
- Front of the house

- Location within Ohio Location within the United States
- Location: 35 E. 1st St., Dayton, Ohio
- Coordinates: 39°45′45″N 84°11′29″W
- Area: Less than 1 acre (0.40 ha)
- Built: 1857
- Architectural style: Italianate, Renaissance Revival
- NRHP reference No.: 74001583
- Added to NRHP: November 20, 1974

Dr. Jefferson A. Walters House is a historic residence in downtown Dayton, Ohio, United States. Built in 1832 and one of the city's older houses, it was home to two prominent residents of early Dayton, and it has been named a historic site.

Born in Fayette County in southwestern Pennsylvania, Jefferson Walters emigrated to Ohio in 1830 at the age of twenty. After studying medicine in Worthington, he practiced for three years in Perry County before moving to Dayton in 1837. During much of his life in the city, he distinguished himself as a successful pharmacist, operating a prosperous drugstore from 1841 until suffering a career-ending injury in an 1866 road accident. Although he ultimately regained his health, Walters chose not to return to the medical field, preferring instead a retirement full of philosophy and antiquarian research.

Upon its completion in 1832, it was Dayton's first stone-faced brick residence. It was built for Thomas Clegg, owner of several factories and one of Dayton's most prominent early manufacturers. Built of brick with an asphalt roof, the house rests on a foundation of limestone and features additional elements of wood and limestone. The three-story facade features a main entrance on the first floor, framed by a post and lintel, and flanked by one window on either side, while three windows appear on the second and third stories. The present appearance mixes the Italianate style with elements of other Renaissance Revival styles, as a result of modifications performed in 1857.

In 1974, Walters' house was listed on National Register of Historic Places, qualifying both because of its architecture and because of its prominent namesake resident. It is one of seven National Register-listed properties in a four-block stretch of First Street, along with First Lutheran Church at 138 W., the Biltmore Hotel and the Victoria Theatre at Main Street, the James Brooks House at 41 E., Antioch Temple at 107 E., and the Dayton Memorial Hall at 125 E.

== See also ==
- National Register of Historic Places listings in Dayton, Ohio
