= Brookhouse =

Brookhouse may refer to:

- Brookhouse, Lancashire, England
- Brookhouse, South Yorkshire, England
- Brookhouse Brook, a river in Epping Forest District, Essex
- Brookhouse Colliery, near Sheffield, Yorkshire
- Brookhouse Elementary School, a Canadian public school in Dartmouth, Nova Scotia
- Brookhouse School, Nairobi
- Graham Brookhouse (b. 1962), a British Olympic athlete

== See also ==
- Brook House (disambiguation)
