= Samuel Brooks House =

Samuel Brooks House may refer to:

- Samuel Brooks House (Cornwall, New York), listed on the NRHP in New York
- Samuel Wallace Brooks House, Brownsville, Texas, listed on the NRHP in Cameron County, Texas
- Samuel Brooks House (Massachusetts), Concord, Massachusetts

== See also ==
- Brooks House (disambiguation)
