= Cueto Building =

Historic commercial building in Brownsville, Texas

- La Nueva Libertad
- U.S. National Register of Historic Places
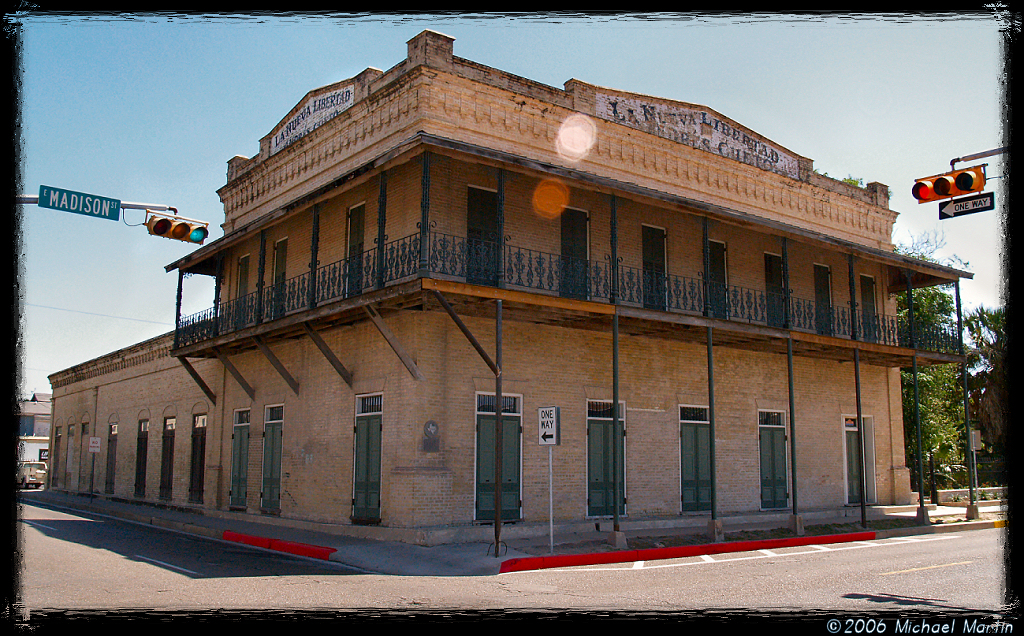

- Location within Texas
- Location: 1301 E. Madison St., Brownsville, Texas
- Coordinates: 25°54′09″N 97°29′38″W
- Area: less than one acre
- Built: 1893
- Built by: Don Andres Cueto
- NRHP reference No.: 84001628
- Added to NRHP: June 14, 1984

The Cueto Building, also known as La Nueva Libertad, is a historic commercial building in Brownsville, Texas (Cameron County, Texas) at 1301 E. Madison Street. It was built in 1893 by Don Andres Cueto (1862–1927) for his mercantile business. He was a native of Spain. The building included a store, storerooms, carriage house, and domed brick bakery ovens. Architectural features include a corbelled brick cornice and parapet. It became a Recorded Texas Historic Landmark in 1985. It is also listed on the National Register of Historic Places.

Cueto was born in Santander, Spain (Cantabria). A plaque commemorates the building's history.

== See also ==
- List of Recorded Texas Historic Landmarks (Cameron-Duval)
- National Register of Historic Places listings in Cameron County, Texas
