= Brook House =

Brook House may refer to:

in England

- Brook House, former home of Lord Louis Mountbatten on Park Lane, London
- Brook House F.C., a non-league football club in Hayes, now known as A.F.C. Hayes
- Brook House Immigration Removal Centre at Gatwick Airport
- A listed building in Blockley, Gloucestershire

in the United States

- Brook Ramble, Townsend, Delaware, listed on the NRHP in New Castle County, Delaware
- Brook Hall, Abingdon, Virginia, listed on the NRHP in Washington County, Virginia

== See also ==
- Brookhouse (disambiguation)
- Brook Farm (disambiguation)
- Brooks House (disambiguation)
