= Old Brulay Plantation =

Historic house in Texas, United States

- U.S. National Register of Historic Places
- Location within Texas Location within the United States
- Nearest city: Brownsville, Texas
- Coordinates: 25°51′15″N 97°24′0″W
- Area: 5 acres (2.0 ha)
- Built: 1870
- Built by: George N. Brulay
- NRHP reference No.: 75001961
- Added to NRHP: October 10, 1975

The Old Brulay Plantation was a Southern plantation with a historic mansion founded in c. 1870 and located in Brownsville, Texas. It has been listed on the National Register of Historic Places since October 10, 1975.

== History ==
The Old Brulay Plantation was established circa 1870, by George Paul Brulay (1839–1905). George Paul Brulay had immigrated from France to Matamoros, Mexico and then to Brownsville, Texas. He bought up 400 acres of land located near the Rio Grande, most of which at the time was full of brush plants.

It was initially experimented with different crops on the land; first it was a cotton plantation, followed by a sugar plantation. Brulay had built a sugar mill on the property circa 1876. Because this plantation was established after the American Civil War of 1861–1865, the plantation did not own black slaves.

When tariffs on Cuban sugar were removed c. 1910, the plantation closed down.

Brulay's sons worked the farm until it was sold in 1924. It was acquired by immigrants from Japan prior to World War I. The plantation was purchased by the Nye family in 1931. By 2016, it still belonged to the same family.

== See also ==
- National Register of Historic Places listings in Cameron County, Texas
- Recorded Texas Historic Landmarks in Cameron County
