= Joseph Lovering House =

Historic house in Massachusetts, United States

- U.S. National Register of Historic Places
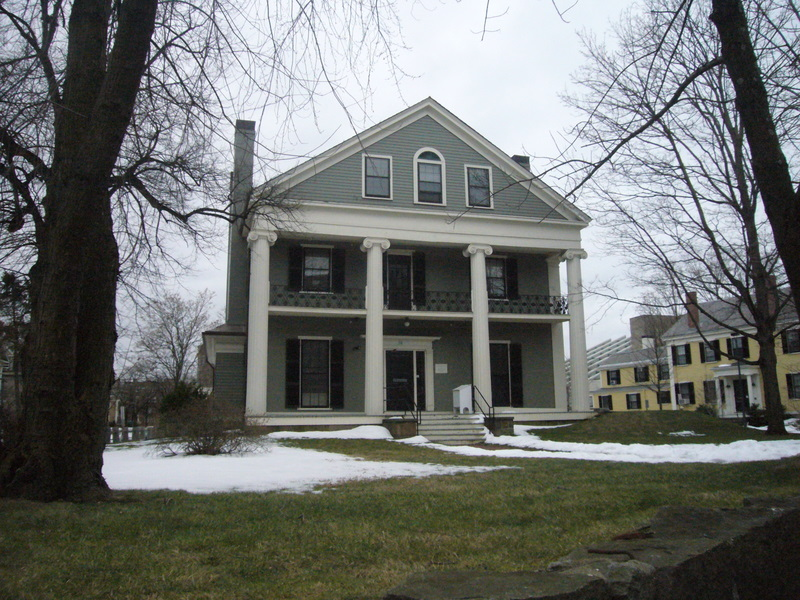

- Location within Massachusetts
- Location: Cambridge, Massachusetts
- Coordinates: 42°22′36.0″N 71°06′45.4″W
- Built: 1839
- Architect: Hastings, Oliver; Brooks, Luther
- Architectural style: Greek Revival
- MPS: Cambridge MRA
- NRHP reference No.: 86002076
- Added to NRHP: September 12, 1986

The Joseph Lovering House is an historic house located at 38 Kirkland Street in Cambridge, Massachusetts.

== Description ==
The 2 1/2-story Greek Revival wood-frame house was built in 1839 by Oliver Hastings, a high-profile local builder (whose own mansion is now a National Historic Landmark), in conjunction with Luther Brooks, owner of the next-door house. It was purchased in 1843 by Joseph Lovering, a math professor at Harvard University, and remained in his family until 1941. After serving for a number of years as part of a nursing home, the house was acquired by Harvard in 1961.

The house was listed on the National Register of Historic Places in 1986. It currently houses Harvard's Center for Middle Eastern Studies.

== See also ==
- National Register of Historic Places listings in Cambridge, Massachusetts
