= S. E. Brackett House =

Historic house in Massachusetts, United States

- U.S. National Register of Historic Places
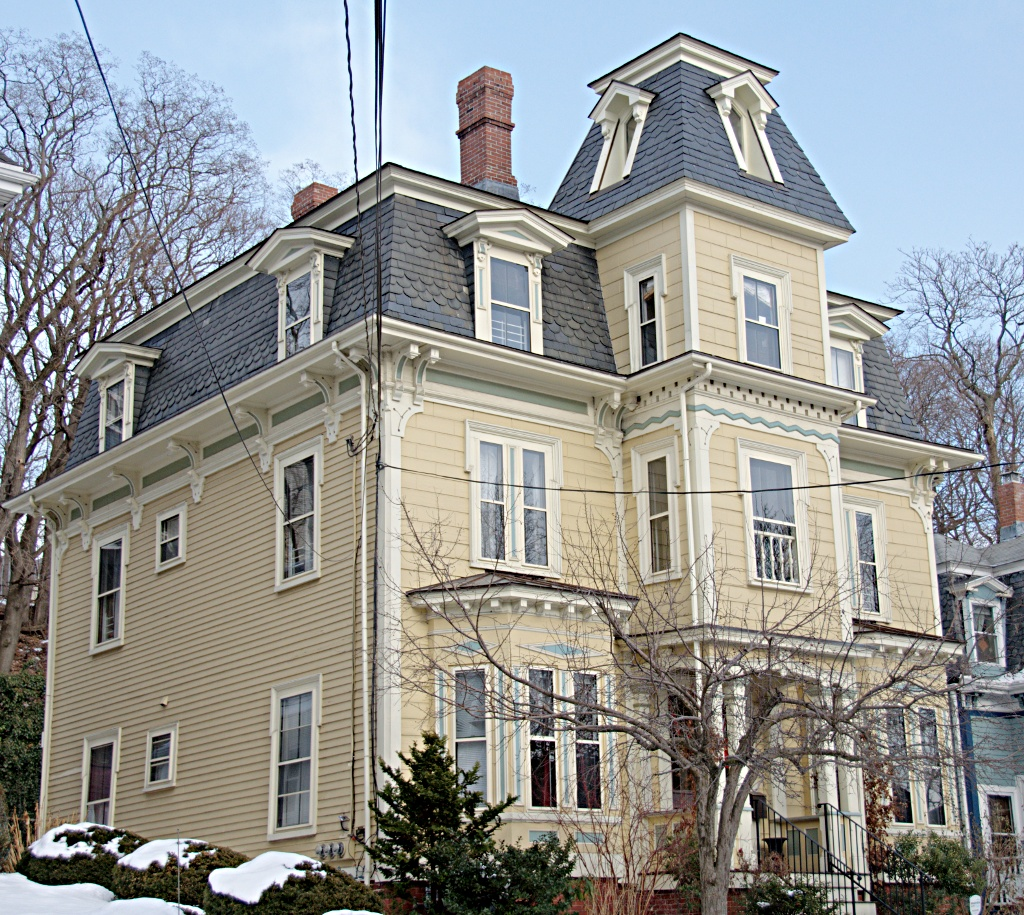

- Location within Massachusetts Location within the United States
- Location: 63 Columbus Ave., Somerville, Massachusetts
- Coordinates: 42°22′55.02″N 71°5′41.60″W
- Area: less than one acre
- Built: 1880
- Architectural style: Second Empire
- MPS: Somerville MPS
- NRHP reference No.: 89001252
- Added to NRHP: September 18, 1989

The S. E. Brackett House is a historic house in Somerville, Massachusetts, United States. Built about 1880, it is one of the city's most elaborate examples of Second Empire architecture. It was listed on the National Register of Historic Places in 1989.

== Description and history ==
The S.E. Brackett House stands in a residential part of Somerville's Prospect Hill neighborhood, west of Prospect Hill Park on the north side of Columbus Avenue. It is a 2 1/2-story wood-frame structure, with a mansard roof and clapboarded exterior. It is roughly square in shape, with a central projecting section on the front facade that rises a full three stories and is topped by a mansard-style fourth floor. The steep roof sections of the main roof and tower are finished in a combination of rectangular and fish-scale slate shingles, and are pierced by gabled window dormers with projecting bracketed eaves. On the first floor, the central section is flanked by projecting bay windows with decorative surrounds and modillioned cornices. The front facade is in a flush-boarded wood finished designed to simulate stone. The roof line below the mansard roof has an extended eave with single and paired brackets on the sides.

The house was constructed c. 1880, and is one of the most elaborate Second Empire houses in the city. It was built for S. E. Brackett, a local merchant, and was located at a desirable corner of a subdivision laid out in 1870 by Ira Hill.

== See also ==
- James H. Brooks House, next door
- National Register of Historic Places listings in Somerville, Massachusetts
