= Brookhouse Brook =

River in Essex, England

Coordinates: 51.6596°N 0.1359°E

Brookhouse Brook is a 6.23 km (3.87 mi) long stream (brook) in the Epping Forest District of Essex, England, that is a tributary to the River Roding.

== Course ==
Rising from a drainage basin in Epping Forest near Theydon Bois Golf Club, Brookhouse Brook flows an easterly course under the M11 motorway via a culvert, then continues on its course through the hamlet of Steward's Green. After reaching Fiddlers Hamlet, Brookhouse Brook turns south, flowing under the M11 motorway once again and through Theydon Garnon, before flowing into the River Roding at Abridge.

== Water quality ==
Water quality of the brook in 2019, according to the Environment Agency, a non-departmental public body sponsored by the United Kingdom's Department for Environment, Food and Rural Affairs:

Ecological Status	Chemical Status	Length	Catchment
Moderate	Fail	6.235 km (3.874 mi)	18.68 km^{2} (7.21 sq mi)

In April 1985, an accident on the M11 motorway led to approximately 100 gallons of the insecticide chlorpyrifos spilling into the Brookhouse Brook, subsequently flowing into the River Roding and killing thousands of fish and millions of invertebrates. This accounted for approximately 90 percent of the fish population.
