= Daniel R. Brooks =

Canadian scientist and academic

Daniel R. Brooks FRSC is a professor emeritus of Evolutionary Biology at the University of Toronto, fellow at the Stellenbosch Institute for Advanced Study and senior fellow at the H. W. Manter Laboratory of Parasitology. He specializes in biodiversity, systematics, and conservation biology.

In 2004, he was elected as a fellow of the Royal Society of Canada.

== Bibliography ==
=== Books ===
- Brooks, Daniel R.; Agosta, Salvatore J. (2024). A Darwinian Survival Guide: Hope For The Twenty-First Century. The MIT Press. ISBN 978-0-262-04868-2.
- Agosta, Salvatore J.; Brooks, Daniel R. (2020). The Major Metaphors of Evolution: Darwinism Then And Now. Springer. ISBN 978-3-030-52085-4.
- Brooks, Daniel R.; Hoberg, Eric P.; Boeger, Walter A. (2019). The Stockholm Paradigm: Climate Change and Emerging Disease. University of Chicago Press. ISBN 9780226632308.
