= Wright-Brooks House =

- U.S. National Register of Historic Places
- U.S. National Historic Landmark District – Contributing property
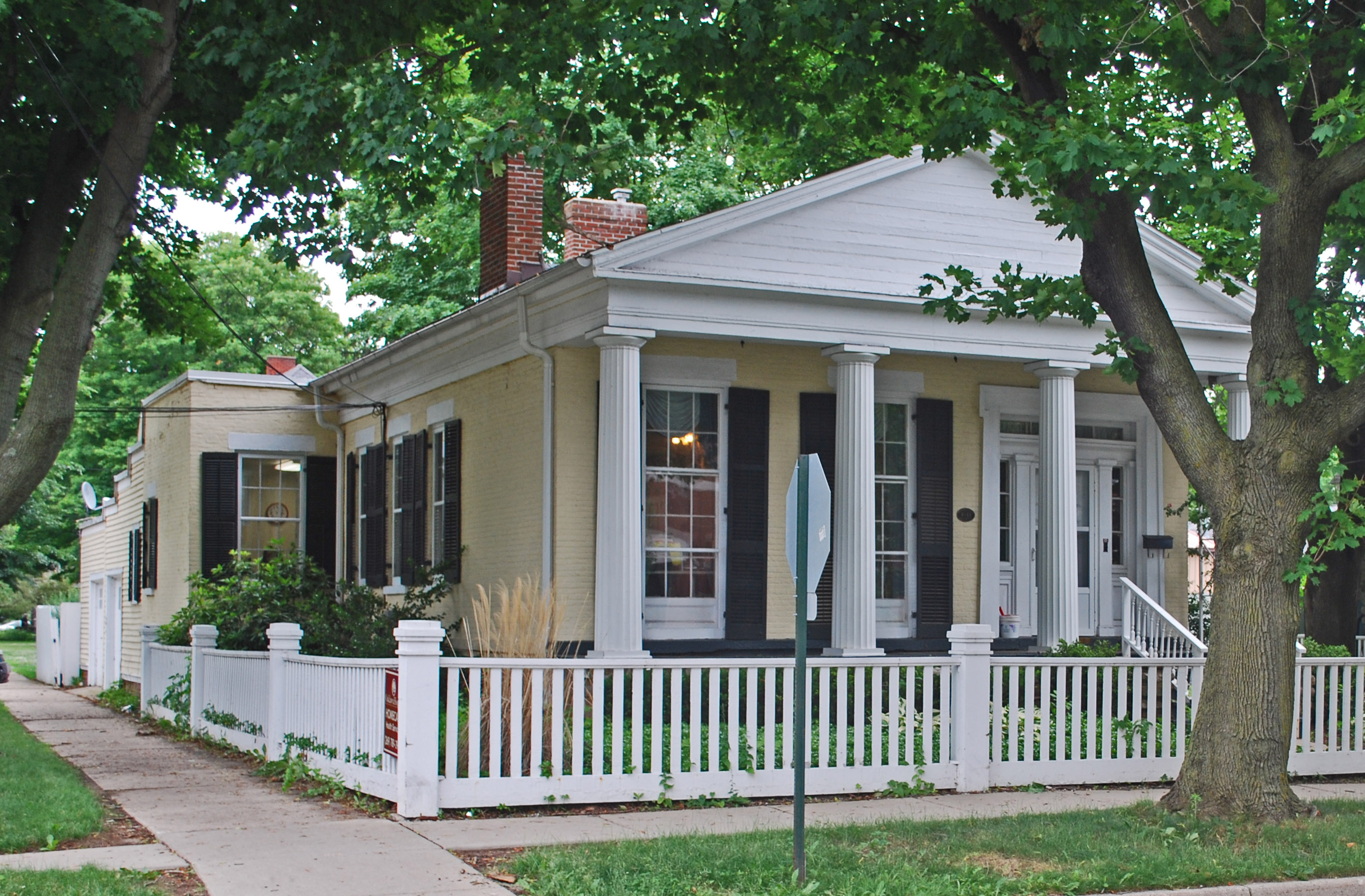
- Interactive map
- Location: 122 N. High St., Marshall, Michigan
- Coordinates: 42°16′22″N 84°57′20″W
- Area: less than one acre
- Built: 1841
- Architectural style: Greek Revival
- Part of: Marshall Michigan Historic Landmark District (ID91002053)
- NRHP reference No.: 72000601
- Added to NRHP: March 16, 1972

The Wright-Brooks House, also known as the Daniel Pratt House, is a single-family home located at 122 North High Street in Marshall, Michigan. It was listed on the National Register of Historic Places in 1972.

== History ==
In 1840, Daniel and Eunice Pratt moved to Marshall, where Daniel established himself as a jeweler. He likely began construction on this house in 1841, finishing it in time for his daughter's wedding in 1842 to George S. Wright, a businessman and banker who had arrived in Marshall in 1835. In 1849, the Pratts moved on to Niles, Michigan, where Daniel died ten years later. When they left Marshall, they left the house to their daughter and son-in-law, the Wrights.

George Wright continued to work at a bank until his retirement. Afterward, he moved away from Marshall, leaving the house to his son. George Wright died in 1893. The house remained in the Wright family until 1934, when it was purchased by preservationist Harold C. Brooks. Brooks rehabilitated the house for his son Craig, who lived in the house at least into the 1970s.

== Description ==
The Wright~Brooks House is a single-story brick Greek Revival house with a gable roof. It sits on a sandstone foundation, and a clapboard addition is constructed at the rear. The house has a notable front entrance portico, supported by four delicate Doric columns and containing an elaborate entrance with architrave trim, sidelights, and a transom. The entrance is flanked by high porch windows, which extend almost to the floor.
