= Antioch Temple =

- U.S. National Register of Historic Places
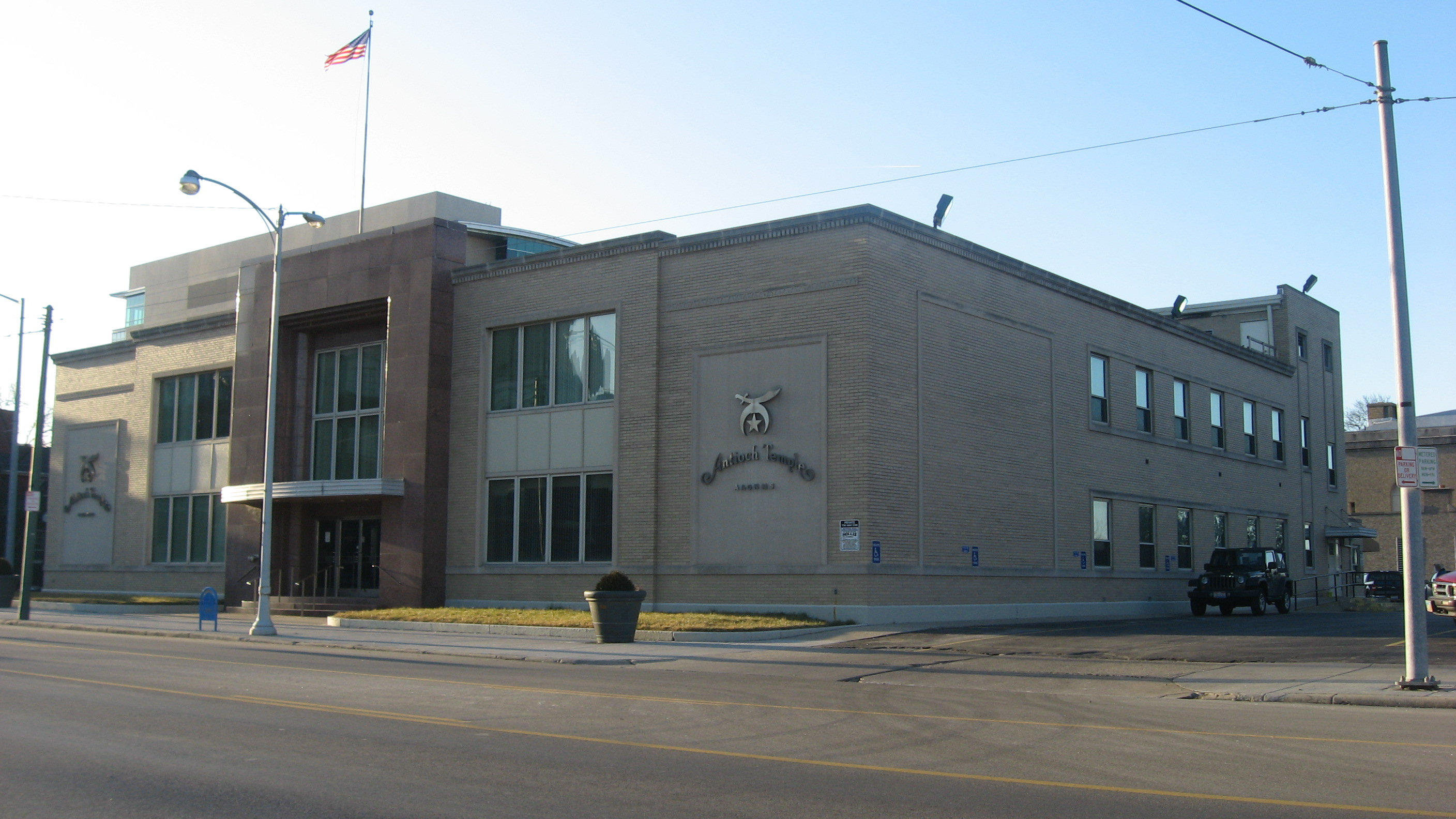

- Location within Ohio Location within the United States
- Location: 107 E First Street; Dayton, Ohio
- Coordinates: 39.7630°N 84.1905°W
- Area: .9 acres (0.36 ha)
- Built: 1954
- Architect: George Totten Neuffer
- Architectural style: Art Deco, modern
- Website: antiochshrine.com
- NRHP reference No.: 12001182
- Added to NRHP: January 14, 2013

The Antioch Temple in Dayton, Ohio is a banquet hall which opened in 1954.

On June 14th, 1898, a charter was granted establishing Antioch Shrine Temple. The first divan was installed on July 18th, 1898. The current site of Antioch was purchased in 1919, and the current structure was built in 1954. The building was listed in the National Register for Historic Places in 2013.
