= Dr. Beauregard Martin Brooks House =

Historic house in Tennessee, United States

- U.S. National Register of Historic Places
- Location within Tennessee Location within the United States
- Location: TN 114 (Clifton Ferry Rd.) E of jct. with TN 69, Bath Springs, Tennessee
- Coordinates: 35°26′21″N 88°5′21″W
- Area: 1.5 acres (0.61 ha)
- Built: 1900
- Built by: Dr. Beauregard Martin Brooks
- Architectural style: I-house
- NRHP reference No.: 92001074
- Added to NRHP: September 3, 1992

The Dr. Beauregard Martin Brooks House is a historic landmark house in Bath Springs, Tennessee, United States. The house was built in 1900 by Beauregard Martin Brooks, a medical doctor, who was then setting up his practice in Bath Springs. The first two-story house to be built in Bath Springs, it contains seven rooms and two halls. There are porches on both the front and back.

It was listed on the National Register of Historic Places in 1992. As of the first decade of the 21st century, it was still owned and occupied by members of the Brooks family.
