= Brooks House (Searcy, Arkansas) =

Historic house in Arkansas, United States

- U.S. National Register of Historic Places
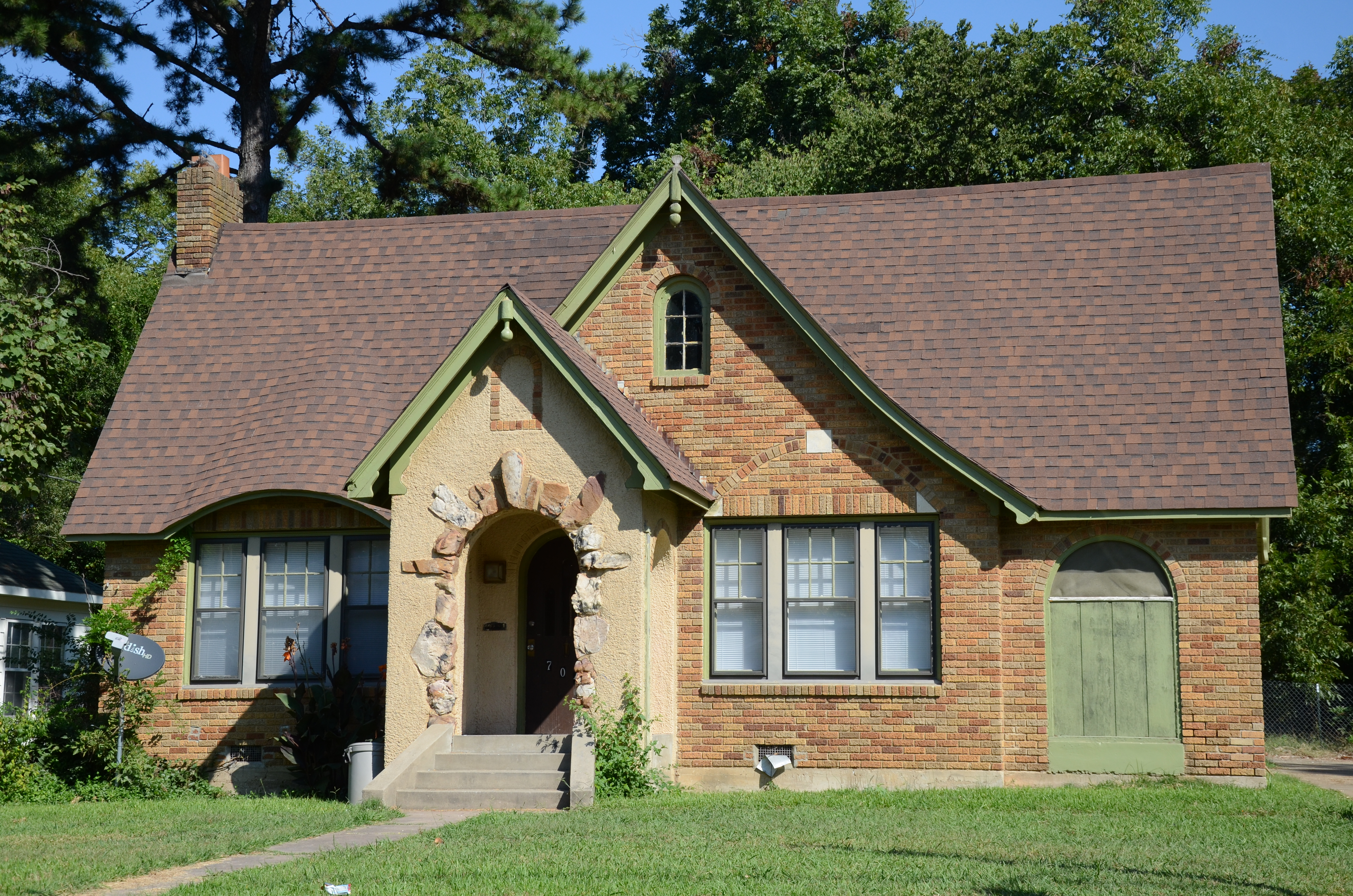

- Location within Arkansas Location within the United States
- Location: 704 E. Market St., Searcy, Arkansas
- Coordinates: 35°14′59″N 91°43′48″W
- Area: less than one acre
- Built: 1935
- Architectural style: Late 19th And 20th Century Revivals, English Revival
- MPS: White County MPS
- NRHP reference No.: 91001217
- Added to NRHP: July 10, 1992

The Brooks House is a historic house at 704 East Market Street in Searcy, Arkansas. It is a 1 1/2-story wood-frame structure, with a side-gable roof, and a slightly off-center projecting gabled section, from which an entrance vestibule projects further at its left edge. To the left of the projecting section is a segmented-arch dormer over a group of three sash windows. Built about 1935, it is a fine local example of a modest English Revival house, echoing more elaborate and larger-scale homes of the style in wealthier communities.

The house was listed on the National Register of Historic Places in 1992.

== See also ==
- National Register of Historic Places listings in White County, Arkansas
