= Steward's Green =

Hamlet in Essex, England

Coordinates: 51.6885°N 0.1236°E

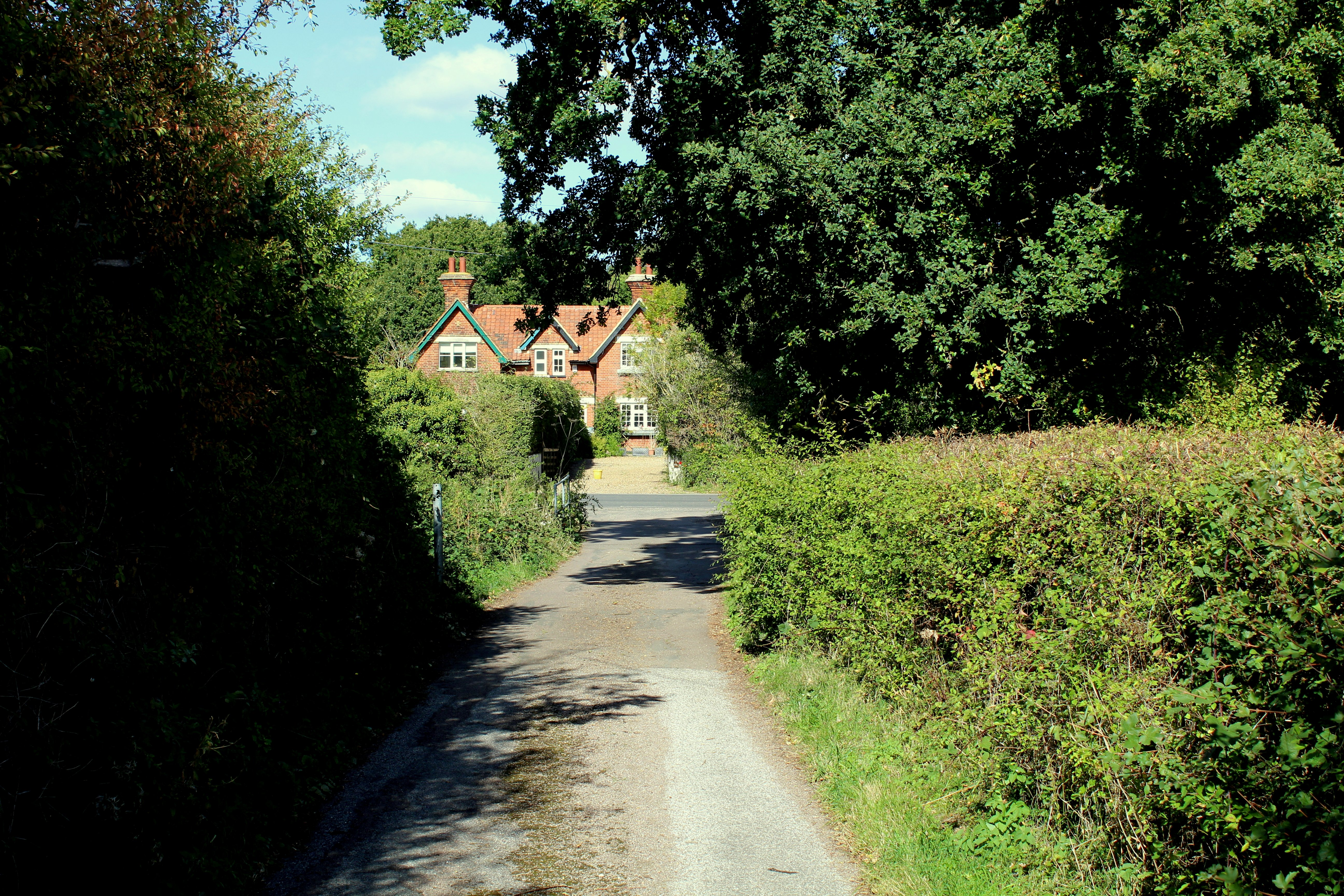

- Location within Essex
- Civil parish: Epping
- District: Epping Forest
- Shire county: Essex
- Region: East
- Country: England
- Sovereign state: United Kingdom

Steward's Green is a small hamlet in the civil parish of Epping, in the Epping Forest district, in the county of Essex, England.

== Location ==
It is located near the hamlet of Fiddlers Hamlet and the town of Epping.

== Transport ==
For transport there is the Epping tube station; and nearby are the M25 motorway and M11 motorway motorways, although there is no nearby access from either motorway.
