= Sambrook =

Sambrook or Sambrooke may refer to:

== Places ==
- Sambrook, Shropshire, a village in England

== People with the surname ==
- Andrew Sambrook (born 1979), English footballer
- Clare Sambrook, English freelance journalist and author
- Gary Sambrook, Conservative MP for Birmingham Northfield since 2019
- Joseph Sambrook (1939-2019), British molecular biologist
- Richard Sambrook, Vice Chairman and Chief Content Officer of the Edelman public relations agency

== Other uses ==
- Sambrooke Freeman (c. 1721 – 1782), member of the Freeman family of Fawley Court near Henley-on-Thames, England
- Sambrook's Brewery, a brewery in Battersea, London
