= Brook Ramble =

Historic house in Delaware, US

- U.S. National Register of Historic Places
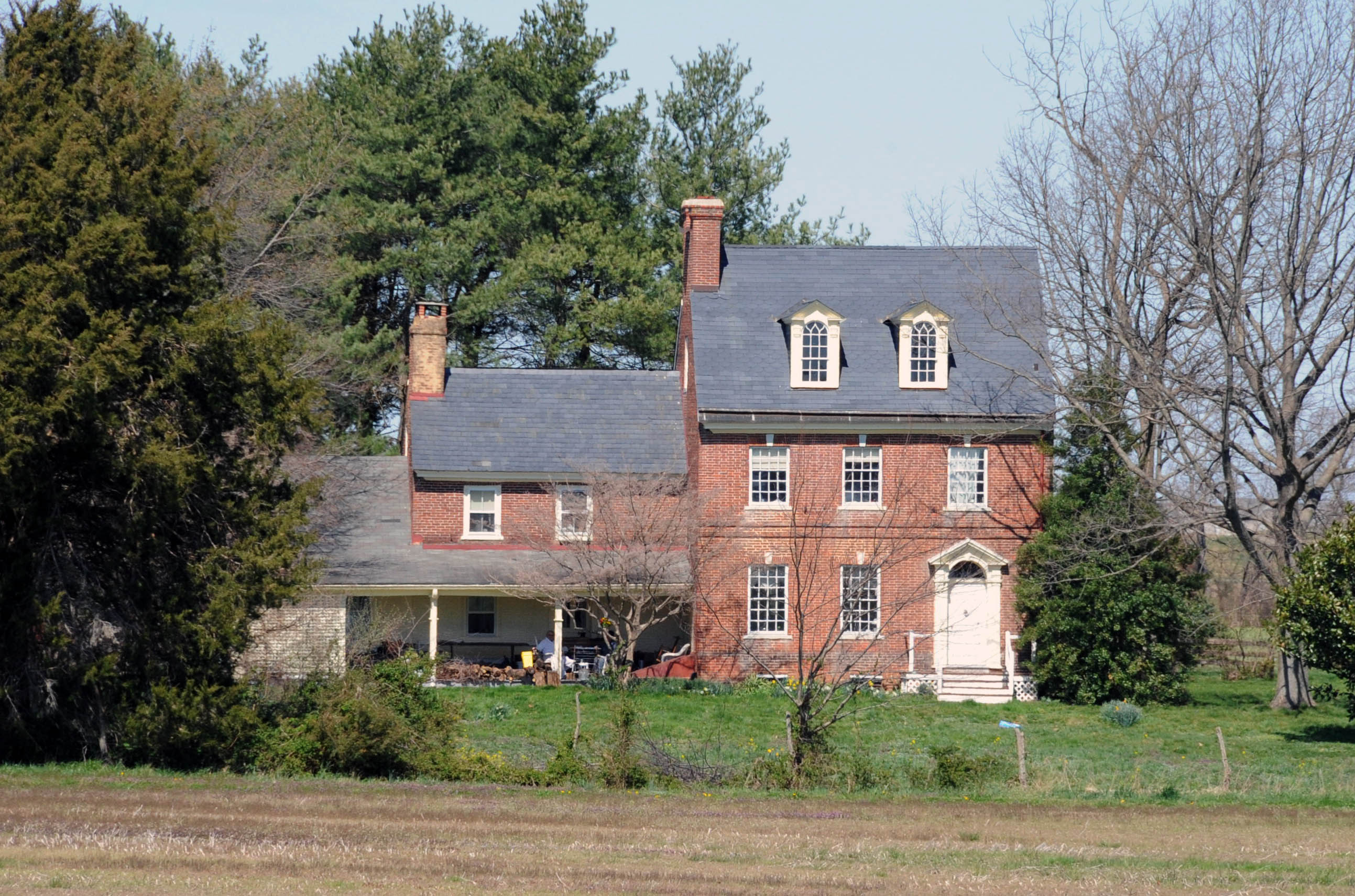
- The front of Brook Ramble

- Location within Delaware Location within the United States
- Location: 295 Grears Corner Road, near Townsend, Delaware
- Coordinates: 39.402399°N 75.732005°W
- Area: 10.5 acres (4.2 ha)
- Architectural style: Federal
- MPS: Dwellings of the Rural Elite in Central Delaware MPS
- NRHP reference No.: 92001137
- Added to NRHP: September 11, 1992

Brook Ramble, also known as the James Crawford House, is a historic home located near Townsend in New Castle County, Delaware, United States. It was built about 1810, and is a 2 1/2-story, three-bay brick dwelling with an interior brick chimneys at the west gable ends. It has a slate covered gable roof. The main house measures approximately 28 feet by 33 feet and has a side passage plan. There is an original service wing measuring 27 feet by 17 feet. It is in the Federal style.

It was listed on the National Register of Historic Places in 1992.
