= Luther Brooks House =

Historic house in Massachusetts, United States

- U.S. National Register of Historic Places
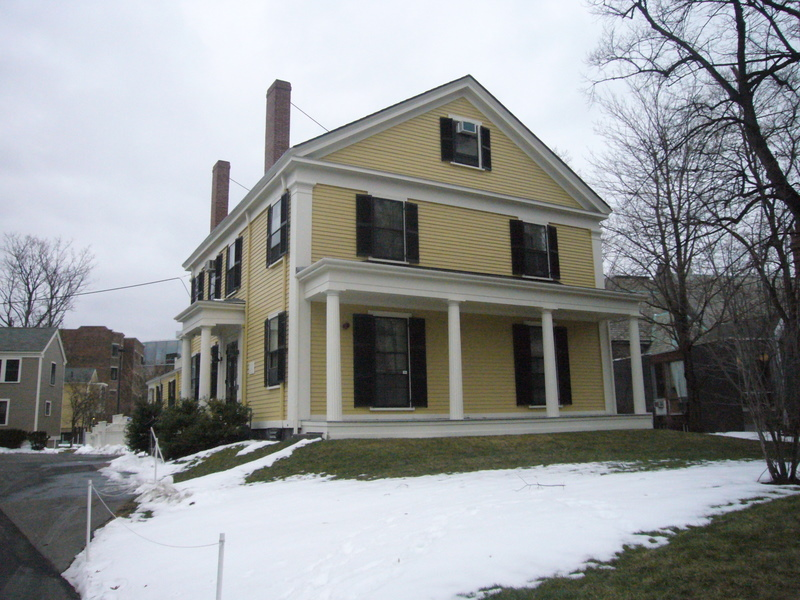

- Location within Massachusetts Location within the United States
- Location: Cambridge, Massachusetts
- Coordinates: 42°22′35.7″N 71°06′47.1″W
- Built: 1840
- Architect: Hastings, Oliver
- Architectural style: Greek Revival
- MPS: Cambridge MRA
- NRHP reference No.: 86002068
- Added to NRHP: September 12, 1986

The Luther Brooks House is a historic house located at 34 Kirkland Street in Cambridge, Massachusetts.

== Description and history ==
The 2 1/2-story wood-frame house was built in 1840 by Oliver Hastings. It retained a traditional entry centered on the long side of the house, while it was oriented with its gable to the street in the Greek Revival style. A two-story ell at the rear of the house is probably original, and the house was further extended with a single story addition on its east side.

The house was listed on the National Register of Historic Places on September 12, 1986.

== See also ==
- Joseph Lovering House, 38 Kirkland Street, also a Hastings design
- Church of the New Jerusalem (Cambridge, Massachusetts), also adjacent
- National Register of Historic Places listings in Cambridge, Massachusetts
