= Brooks–Brown House =

Historic house in Virginia, United States

- U.S. National Register of Historic Places
- Virginia Landmarks Register
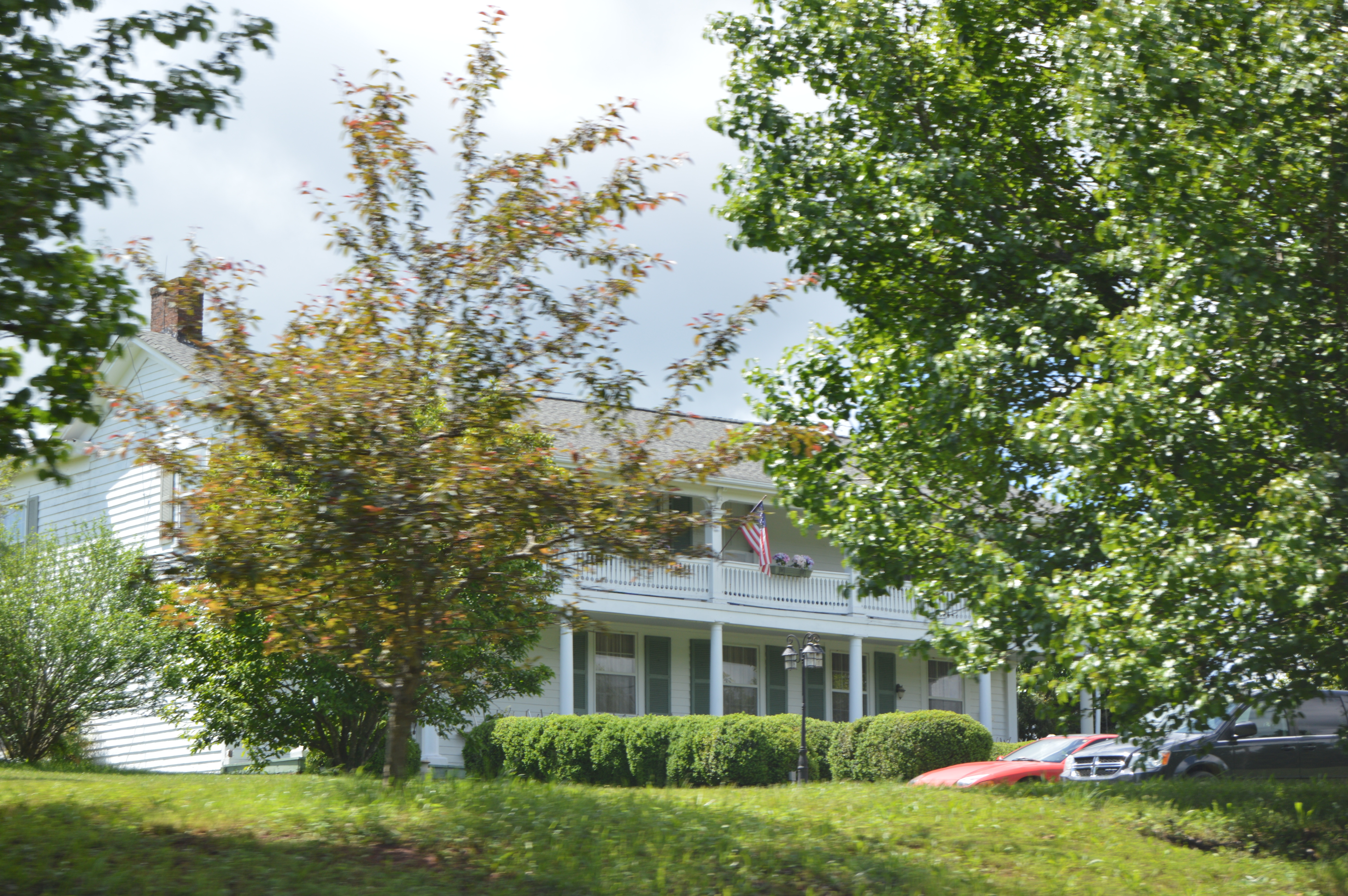
- Front of the house

- Location within Virginia Location within the United States
- Location: Truevine Road north of Chesnut Mountain Road, Dickinson, Virginia
- Coordinates: 36°55′15″N 79°42′30″W
- Area: 10 acres (4.0 ha)
- Built by: George Hutcheson
- Architectural style: Greek Revival, Italianate
- NRHP reference No.: 89001930
- VLR No.: 033-0128

Significant dates
- Added to NRHP: November 2, 1989
- Designated VLR: August 15, 1989

Brooks–Brown House, also known as the Brown-Law House, Law Home, and Halfway House, is a historic home located near Dickinson, Franklin County, Virginia. The first section was built about 1830, with a two-story addition built about 1850. Renovations about 1870, unified the two sections as a two-story, frame dwelling with a slate gable roof. At the same time, an Italianate style two-story porch was added and the interior was remodeled in the Greek Revival style. A rear kitchen and bathroom wing was added as part of a renovation in 1987–1988. It measures approximately 52 feet by 38 feet and sits on a brick foundation. Also on the property are a contributing detached log kitchen and dining room, a cemetery, and the site of a 19th-century barn. The house served as a stagecoach stop and inn during the mid-19th century and the property had a tobacco factory from about 1870 until 1885.

It was listed on the National Register of Historic Places in 1989.
