= Brook Farm (Thornton-Cleveleys, Lancashire) =

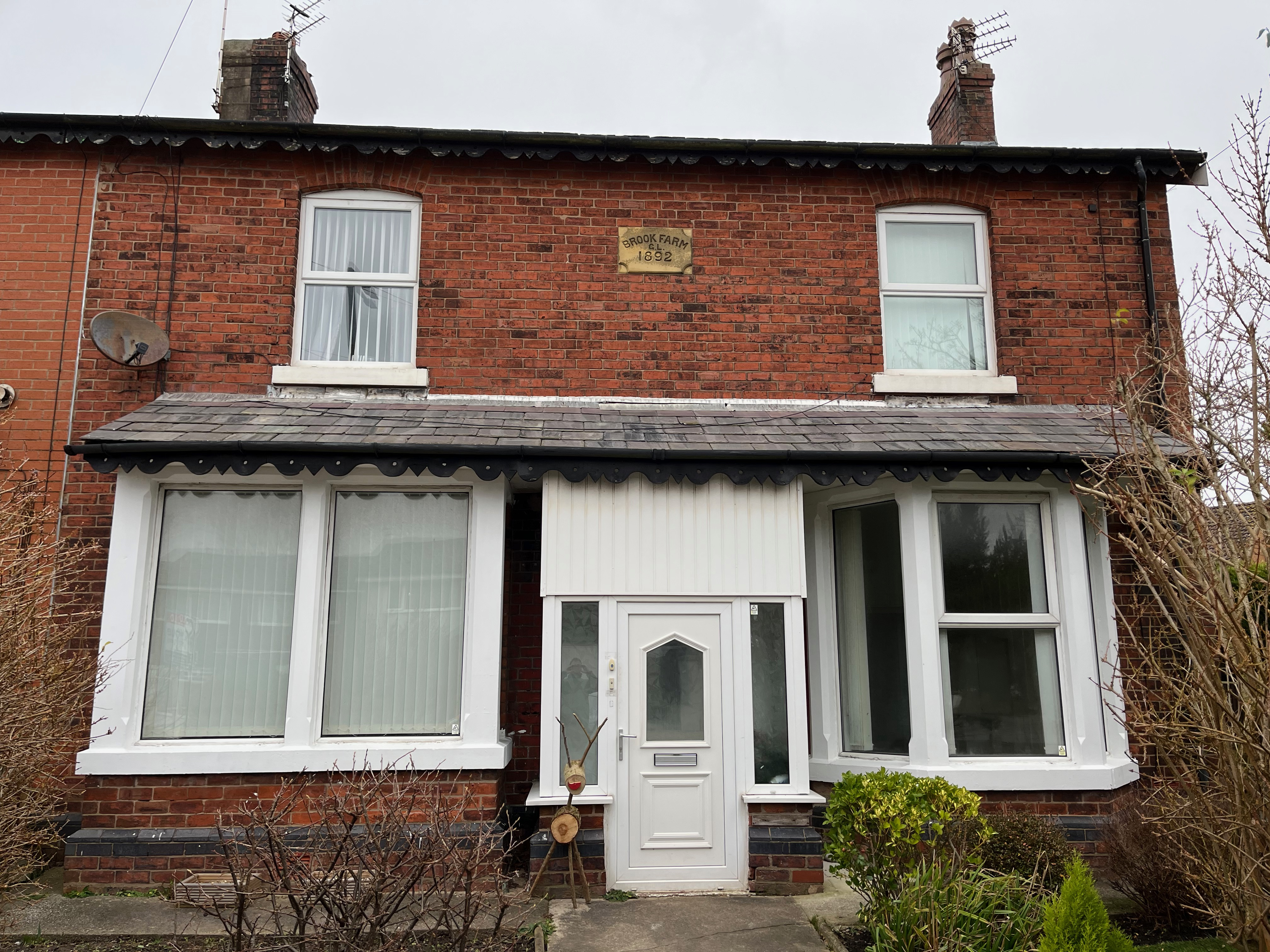
- The original farmhouse, 2023
- Interactive map of the Brook Farm area

General information
- Location: Thornton, Lancashire, England, UK, Hillylaid Road
- Coordinates: 53°52′35″N 2°59′42″W
- Completed: 1892 (134 years ago)

Technical details
- Floor count: 2

Brook Farm in Thornton-Cleveleys, Lancashire, England, was built in 1892. At that time, it was one of the only properties in the area on what was then its farmland. Its earliest known reference (erroneously named Brooks Farm Cottages) in literature is in the 1918 edition of The London Gazette in 1918. In the 1915 edition of The Dairy periodical, a Mrs. S. A. Keirby is stated as owning a dairy farm here.

Originally a standalone building, two bays wide, it was extended to the west in the mid–20th century, adding two properties.

Several hundred houses were built on and around its former farmland in the late 20th century, on land abutting the former ICI Hillhouse site which is known to be contaminated.

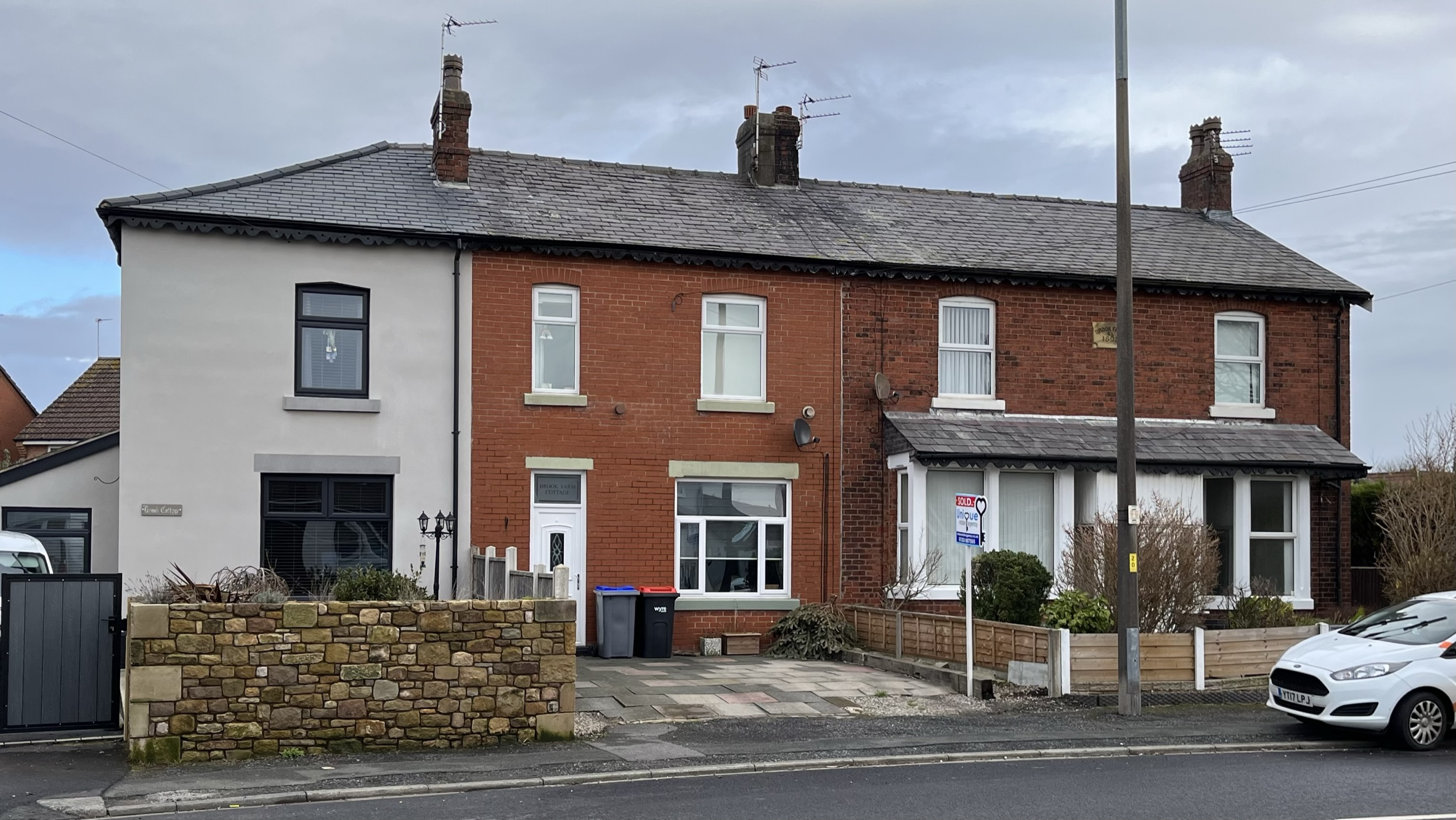
The building post-extension

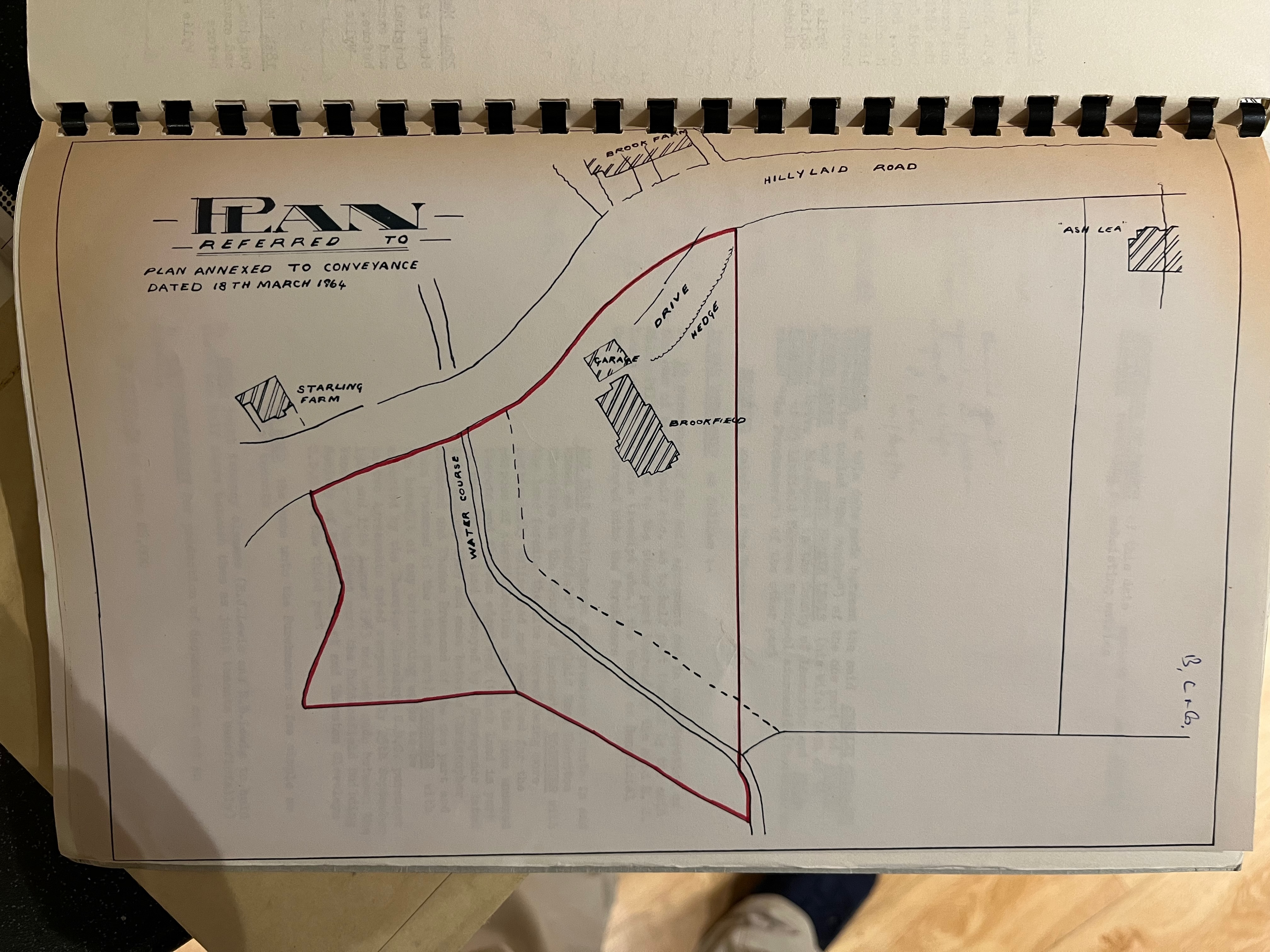
A 1964 plan of Hillylaid Road showing Brook Farm and its farmland, known as Brookfield. Starling Farm, to the west, was demolished shortly thereafter
