= Solomon Neill Brooks House =

Historic house in Kentucky, United States

- U.S. National Register of Historic Places
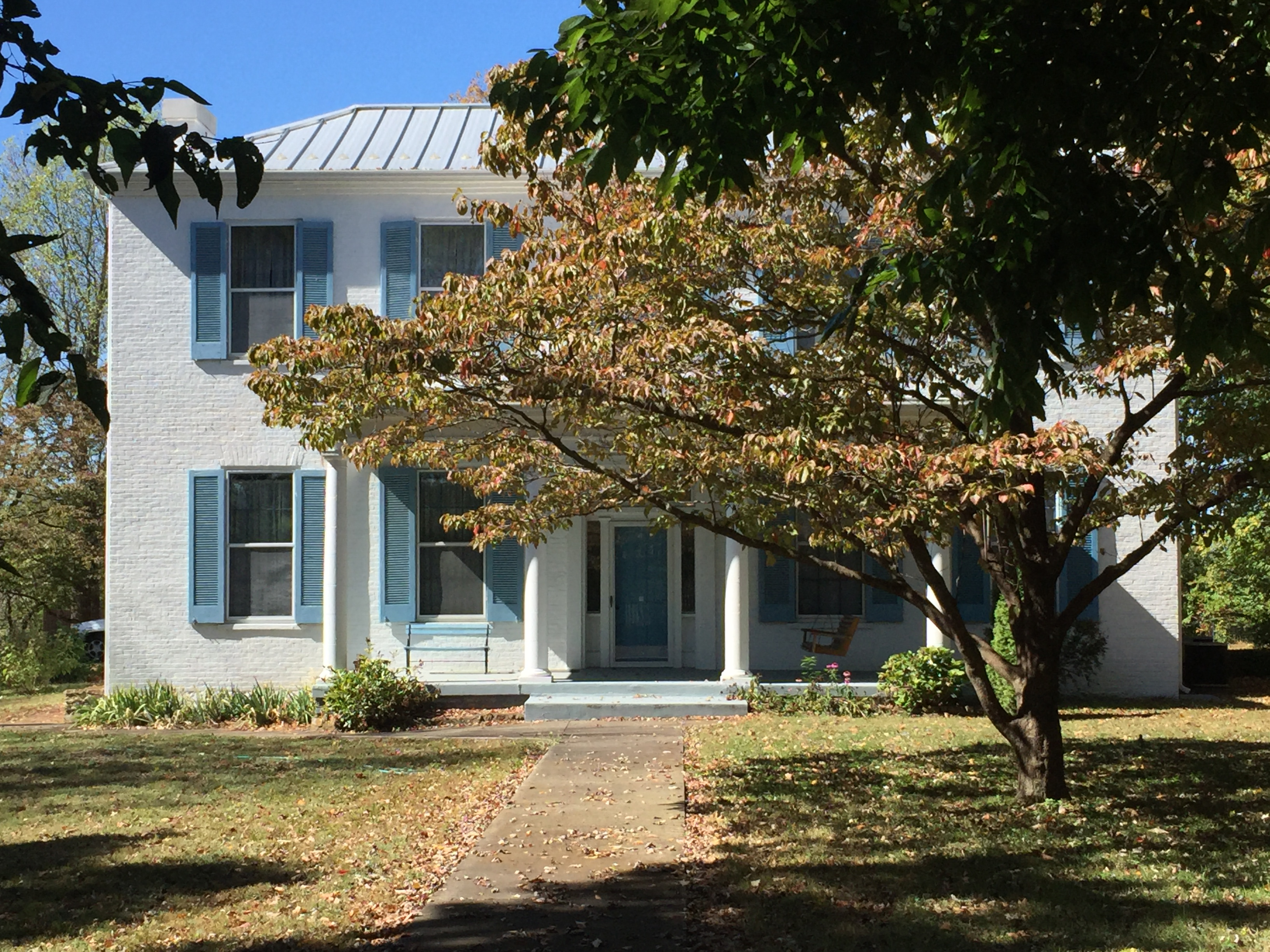

- Location within Kentucky Location within the United States
- Location: Northeast of Shepherdsville, Kentucky at Hebron Lane and Kentucky Route 61
- Coordinates: 38°03′09″N 85°40′48″W
- Area: 2 acres (0.81 ha)
- Built: 1847
- Architectural style: Greek Revival
- NRHP reference No.: 80001488
- Added to NRHP: April 10, 1980

The Solomon Neill Brooks House, near Shepherdsville, Kentucky, was built in 1847. It was listed on the National Register of Historic Places in 1980.

It is a two-story, five-bay brick Greek Revival house with a central passage plan.

Three contemporary outbuildings are included in the listing.
