= John Brooks House =

Historic house in Massachusetts, United States

- U.S. National Register of Historic Places
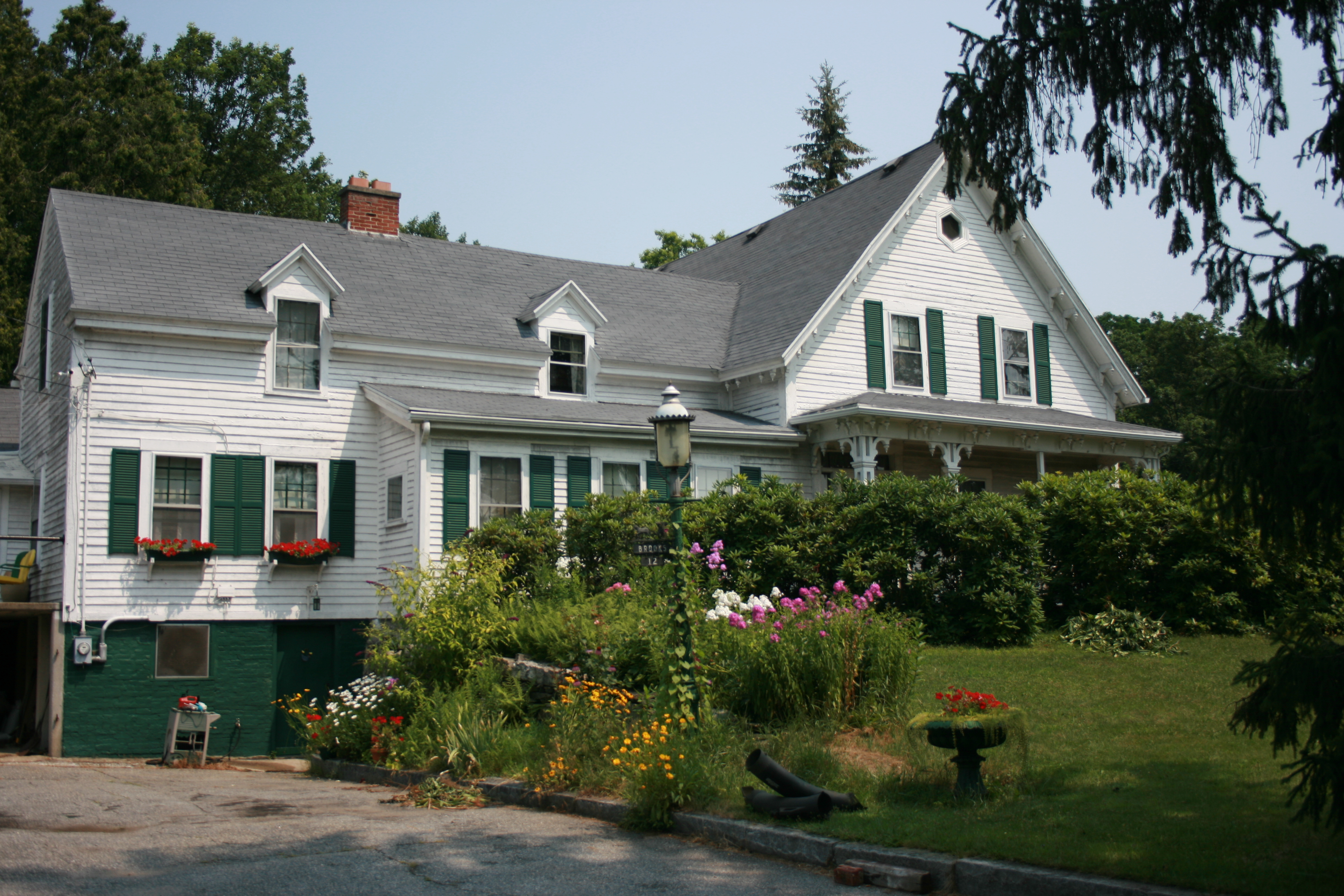

- Location within Massachusetts Location within the United States
- Location: 12 Nelson Pl., Worcester, Massachusetts
- Coordinates: 42°17′48″N 71°49′11″W
- Area: 3 acres (1.2 ha)
- Built: 1847; 1856
- Architectural style: Italianate; Gothic
- MPS: Worcester MRA
- NRHP reference No.: 80000516
- Added to NRHP: March 05, 1980

The John Brooks House is an historic house at 12 Nelson Place in Worcester, Massachusetts. Built between 1847 and 1856 by John Brooks, a prominent local farmer and politician, it is one of a small number of 19th-century farmhouses still standing in the city. The house was listed on the National Register of Historic Places in 1980, at which time it was still the hands of Brooks' descendants.

== Description and history ==
The John Brooks House is located in a basically residential area in northern Worcester, on a large lot at the northwest corner of Nelson Place and Grove Street (Massachusetts Route 122A). It is a 1 1/2-story wood-frame structure, with a roughly T-shaped plan covered by gabled roofs. The south facade distinctively has three large gables which rise to nearly meet the main ridge line, with rake edges adorned by paired Italianate brackets. A single-story hip-roofed enclosed porch extends across part of this facade, with an entrance at the far right sheltered by an ornately carved hood. Facing Nelson Place, the gable end of the main block is also adorned with brackets. A less elaborate ell with a lower pitch roof extends to the west.

John Brooks, a Princeton native and farmer, purchased land here in 1847, and is believed to have built the ell of the house by 1851. The main block was added later, by 1856. In addition to farming, Brooks served on Worcester's common council, and in the state legislature. He was also active in the development of the city's Chadwick Square and Greendale areas.

== See also ==
- National Register of Historic Places listings in northwestern Worcester, Massachusetts
- National Register of Historic Places listings in Worcester County, Massachusetts
