= Daniel Brooks House =

Historic house in Massachusetts, United States

- U.S. National Register of Historic Places
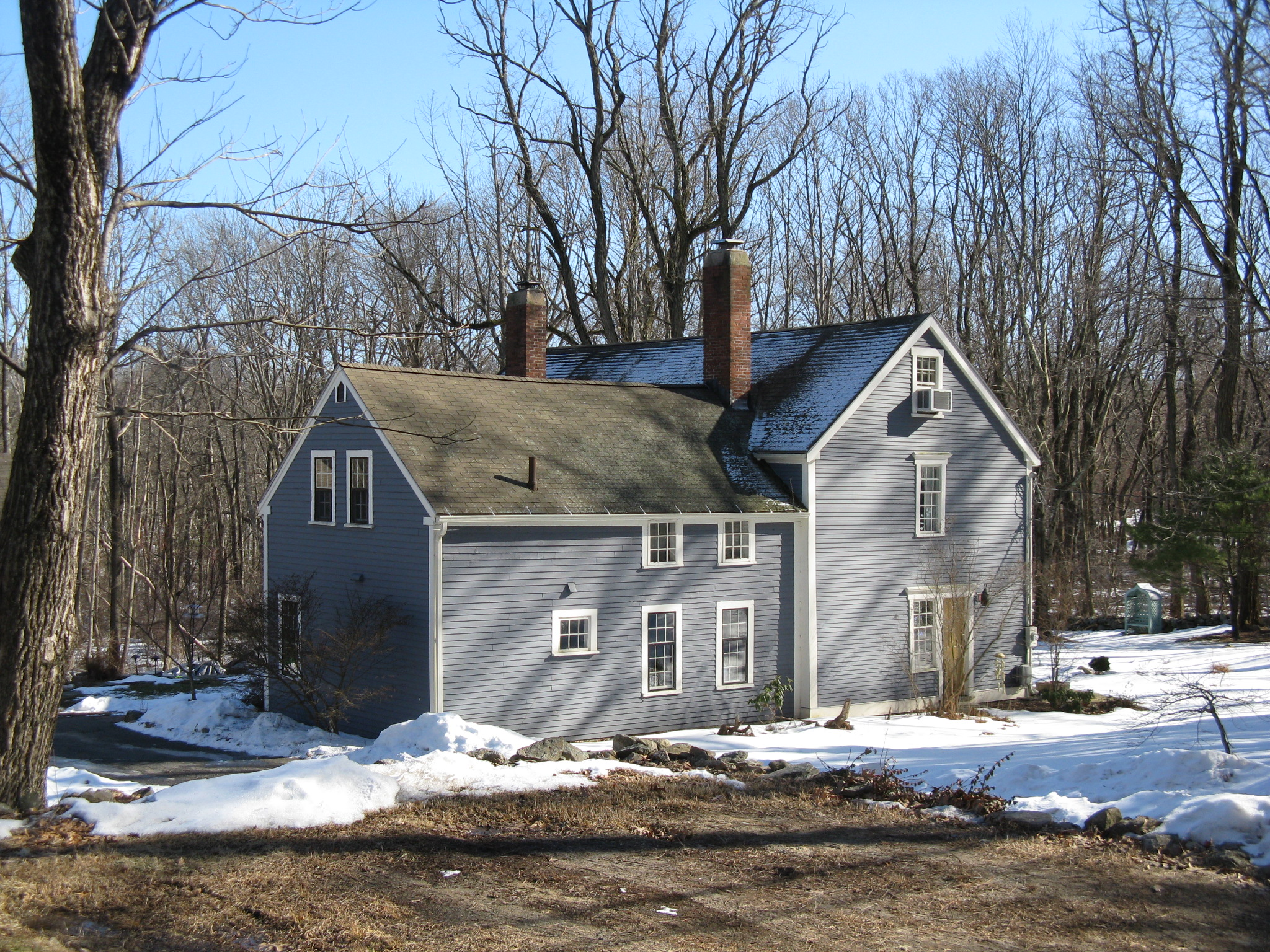

- Location within Massachusetts Location within the United States
- Location: 19 Brooks Road, Lincoln, Massachusetts
- Coordinates: 42°26′50″N 71°18′35″W
- Built: 1695 (331 years ago)
- Architectural style: First Period
- NRHP reference No.: 73000293
- Added to NRHP: October 25, 1973

The Daniel Brooks House is an historic First Period house located at 19 Brooks Road in Lincoln, Massachusetts.

== Description and history ==
The oldest portion of this 2 1/2-story timber-frame house was built c. 1695 by Daniel Brooks. Its interior has retained many of its early 18th century features, including exposed beams, wide pine floorboards, and unbaked bricks used as insulation between inner and outer wall coverings. Eleazar Brooks, a descendant, was a prominent local politician at the time of the American Revolution.

The house was listed on the National Register of Historic Places on October 25, 1973.

== See also ==
- National Register of Historic Places listings in Middlesex County, Massachusetts
