= James Brooks House (Dayton, Ohio) =

Historic house in Ohio, United States

- U.S. National Register of Historic Places
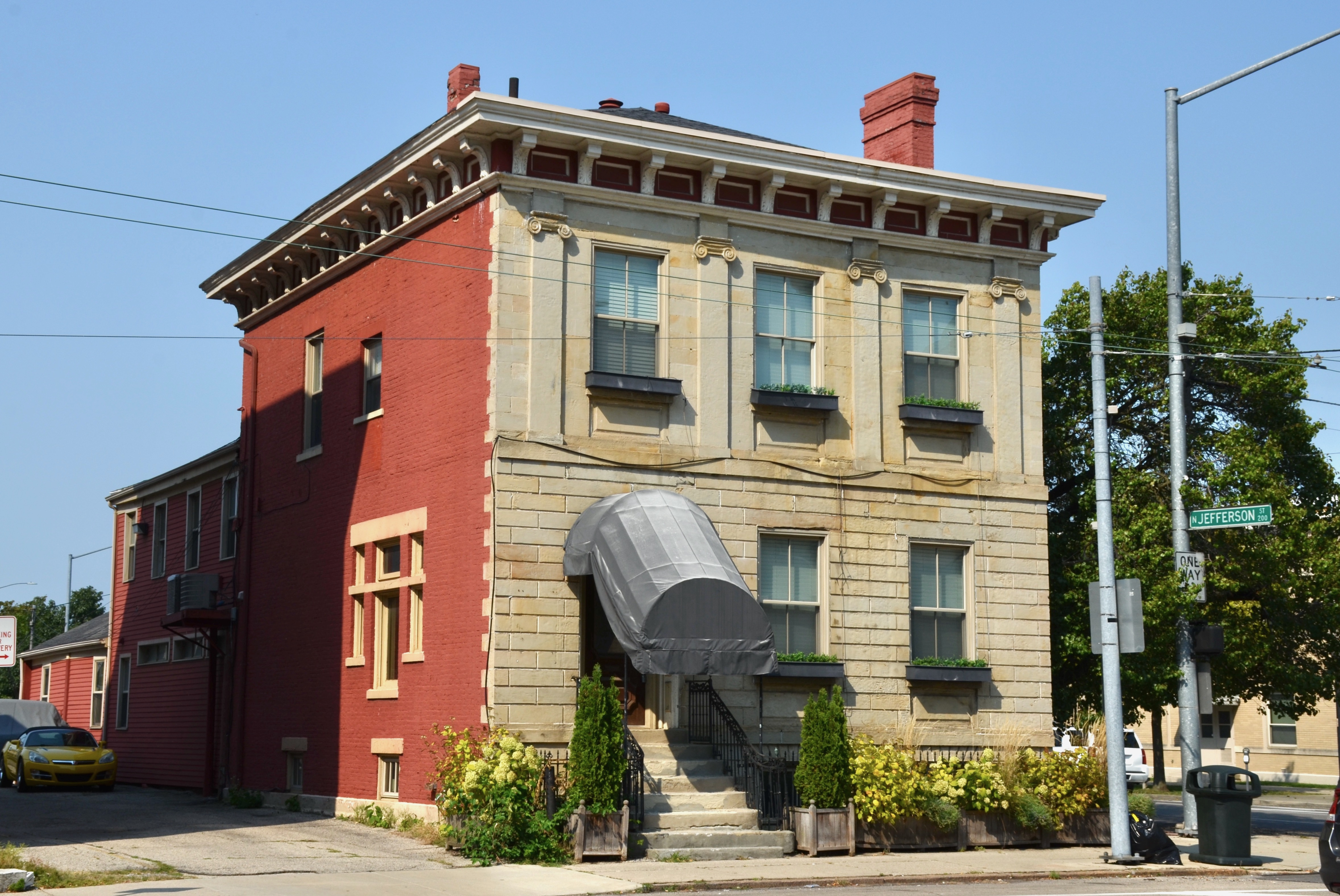
- Front and western side in 2021

- Location within Ohio Location within the United States
- Interactive map showing the location of James Brooks House
- Location: 41 E. 1st St., Dayton, Ohio
- Coordinates: 39°45′46″N 84°11′28″W
- Area: Less than 1 acre (0.40 ha)
- Built: 1831 or 1832
- Architectural style: Greek Revival
- NRHP reference No.: 75001495
- Added to NRHP: May 29, 1975

The James Brooks House is a historic house in downtown Dayton, Ohio, United States. Built in the 1830s and significantly modified later in the century, it was named a historic site in the 1970s.

The Brooks House is a stone building with a brick foundation, an asphalt roof, and additional elements of stone and iron. Its basic plan is a simple rectangle, two stories tall, with an exposed basement. Additional rooms are created by a rear extension that was formed by walling up a large two-story veranda. The facade is three bays wide, with windows in the central and eastern bays of all three floors; the western bay is occupied by a window (second story) and the main entrance (first story), while the western bay of the basement is blocked by a small staircase. Pilasters with Ionic capitals separate the second-story windows, while no comparable ornament is present below. A shallow hip roof covers the building, pierced by chimneys on either side, while its overhang permits room for a cornice composed of large bracket. The sides are noticeably plainer, with the most prominent element of the western side being a simple fire escape.

The house's early history is rather enigmatic. It was built for English immigrant Thomas Clegg, a small-scale industrialist who owned Dayton's first iron and brass foundries, although the precise date is uncertain; a stone building was constructed on the present house's site in 1831, and while this may be the present house, it might not have been constructed until the following year. Montgomery County tax records are also inconclusive: they prove that Clegg never owned the property, nor paid taxes on it, but they fail to identify the owner of the property when the house was built. While the original design was clearly Greek Revival in style, renovations in the middle of the nineteenth century included modifications to the cornice and other changes that together produced an appearance typical of the Victorian era.

In 1975, the Brooks House was listed on the National Register of Historic Places, qualifying because of its historically significant architecture. Another building with the same designation, the Dr. Jefferson A. Walters House, lies in the same block of First Street.

== See also ==
- National Register of Historic Places listings in Dayton, Ohio
