= Brooks Farm =

Historic house in Michigan, United States

- U.S. National Register of Historic Places
- Michigan State Historic Site
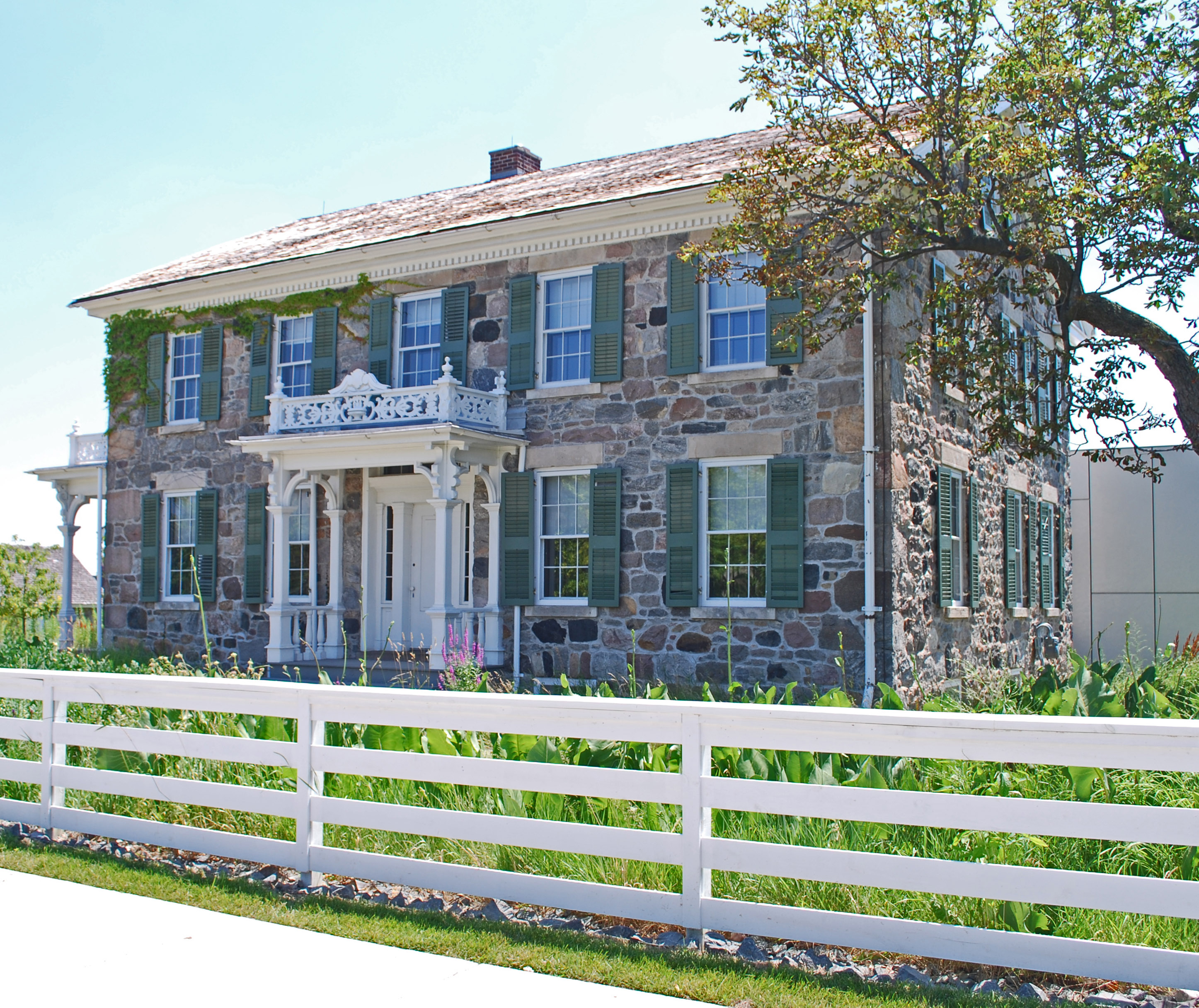

- Location within Michigan Location within the United States
- Interactive map showing the location for Brooks Farm
- Location: 3521 Big Beaver Rd., Troy, Michigan
- Coordinates: 42°33′39″N 83°11′28″W
- Area: 3 acres (1.2 ha)
- Built: 1852
- NRHP reference No.: 72001594

Significant dates
- Added to NRHP: March 16, 1972
- Designated MSHS: June 19, 1971

The William Brooks Farm, also known as the Washington Stanley Farm, is a farmsite located at 3521 Big Beaver Road in Troy, Michigan. It was designated a Michigan State Historic Site in 1971 and listed on the National Register of Historic Places in 1972.

== History ==
Washington Stanley was born in Shaftsbury, Vermont in 1807. There he married a young wife, Lydia, and in 1826 moved with his wife and widowed mother to this site. He built a log cabin and began farming. Washington and Lydia Stanley had six children over the next 15 years, and when Lydia died, Stanley remarried Catherine Elisha Barringer in Macomb, Michigan, on 16 Feb 1842. In 1852, Stanley built the two-story fieldstone house that sits on the site. Stanley died in 1873 and the farm passed to his daughter Elizabeth and her husband Frank Ford.

The Fords continued to farm the property, and in 1911 their daughter, Alta Ford Peabody, sold the farm to William Brooks. The Brooks family used it as a dairy until 1960, when they sold most of the property to developers. The Brooks family continued to live in the house until 1982 when they sold it to the Kresge Foundation.

Kresge began construction on a modern, 10,000 square foot glass, two-story, U-shaped office building behind the 1850s era farmhouse, designed by Detroit architect William Kessler. The Foundation moved into the building in 1984. In 2004, the Foundation outgrew the office building and unveiled plans for a new green-certified headquarters designed by Valerio Dewalt Train Associates. In 2006, a newly constructed 19,500 square foot environmentally sustainable office building opened. The facility was the first LEED Platinum-certified building in Southeast Michigan (2008), and the second in the state. In 2016, the foundation completes a 16,000 foot expansion to the headquarters.

== Description ==
The William Brooks Farm consists of a farmhouse and various outbuildings, including a machine shop with a smokehouse, hog barns, dairy barns, a milk house, a silo, and a corn crib. The farmhouse is a well-preserved two-story fieldstone Greek Revival structure built on a rectangular plan with side gables. The windows are six-over-six anes with shutters. The front facade has a single-story, columned porch with Gothic detail, and the date of construction (1852) is carved into a stone block above the east-side window. A covered porch is built on the rear.

== See also ==
- National Register of Historic Places listings in Oakland County, Michigan
