= James H. Brooks House =

Historic house in Massachusetts, United States

- U.S. National Register of Historic Places
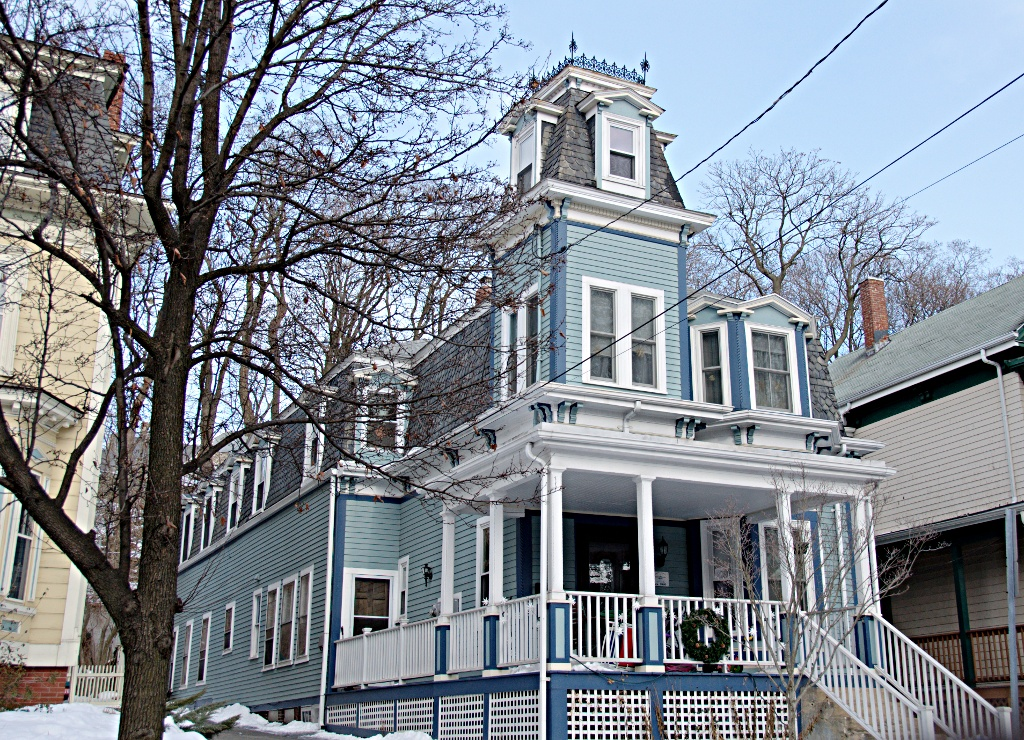

- Location within Massachusetts Location within the United States
- Location: 61 Columbus Ave., Somerville, Massachusetts
- Coordinates: 42°22′54.80″N 71°5′41.14″W
- Area: less than one acre
- Built: 1880
- Architectural style: Second Empire
- MPS: Somerville MPS
- NRHP reference No.: 89001251
- Added to NRHP: September 18, 1989

The James H. Brooks House is a historic house in Somerville, Massachusetts. Built about 1880, it is one of the finer examples of Second Empire architecture in the city. It was listed on the National Register of Historic Places in 1989.

== Description and history ==
The James H. Brooks House stands in a residential area of the city's Prospect Hill neighborhood, on the north side of Columbus Avenue. It is west of the main access to Prospect Hill Park, and its rear property line abuts the park. Set on a narrow lot, it is a 1 1/2-story wood-frame structure, with a mansard roof and clapboarded exterior. Its roof pierced by dormers, including an elaborate projecting dormer on the right side of the front facade. It has a tower rising three stories on the left side; it is topped by a steep mansard-style roof, also with gable dormers, that is surmounted by an iron crested railing. The first floor porch is supported by turned pillars on tall square piers, with paired brackets in the eaves.

The house was built for James Brooks, a dry goods dealer in Union Square. The land it was built on was platted for development in 1870 by Ira Hill, a leading force in the development of Union Square as the city's commercial center. The Prospect Hill area, elevated above the square to the south, was promoted by Hill as a fashionable upper-class residential neighborhood.

== See also ==
- S. E. Brackett House, next door
- National Register of Historic Places listings in Somerville, Massachusetts
