= National Register of Historic Places listings in Cameron County, Texas =

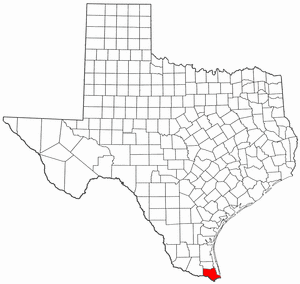
Location of Cameron County in Texas

This is a list of the National Register of Historic Places listings in Cameron County, Texas.

This is intended to be a complete list of properties and districts listed on the National Register of Historic Places in Cameron County, Texas, United States. The publicly disclosed locations of National Register properties and districts may be seen in a mapping service provided. There are 37 properties and districts listed on the National Register in the county, including 4 National Historic Landmarks. Another property that was formerly listed has been removed.

This National Park Service list is complete through NPS recent listings posted September 25, 2026.

== Current listings ==
| | Name on the Register | Image | Date listed | Location | City or town | Description |
|---|---|---|---|---|---|---|
| 1 | Baxter Building | Baxter Building | March 6, 2019 (#100003420) | 106 S. A St. 26°11′33″N 97°41′49″W | Harlingen | |
| 2 | Brazos Santiago Depot | | July 14, 1971 (#71000923) | Address restricted | Port Isabel | |
| 3 | Samuel Wallace Brooks House | Samuel Wallace Brooks House | November 22, 1988 (#88002530) | 623 E St. Charles St. 25°54′14″N 97°30′12″W | Brownsville | |
| 4 | Brown-Wagner House | Brown-Wagner House | August 29, 1977 (#77001430) | 245 E St. Charles St. 25°54′23″N 97°30′22″W | Brownsville | Recorded Texas Historic Landmark |
| 5 | Brownsville City Cemetery and Hebrew Cemetery | Brownsville City Cemetery and Hebrew Cemetery | March 31, 2010 (#10000143) | Bound by E. 5th St., Madison St., E 2nd St., and Town Resaca; 25°54′34″N 97°30′00″W | Brownsville | |
| 6 | Brownsville City Hall and Market House | Brownsville City Hall and Market House | September 30, 2019 (#100004474) | 1150 Market Square; 25°54′08″N 97°29′51″W | Brownsville | |
| 7 | Brownsville Freight Depot and Warehouse District | Brownsville Freight Depot and Warehouse District | March 26, 2018 (#100002266) | Roughly bounded by former RR alignment, E Fronton, E 4th & E 9th Sts. 25°54′09″N 97°30′22″W | Brownsville | |
| 8 | Old Brulay Plantation | | October 10, 1975 (#75001961) | East of Brownsville off the TX 4; 25°51′16″N 97°24′01″W | Brownsville | Also known as the Nye Plantation |
| 9 | Cameron County Courthouse | Cameron County Courthouse | September 27, 1980 (#80004084) | 1150 E Madison St. 25°54′15″N 97°29′43″W | Brownsville | State Antiquities Landmark, Recorded Texas Historic Landmark |
| 10 | Old Cameron County Jail | Old Cameron County Jail | January 24, 1995 (#94001594) | 1201 E Van Buren; 25°54′19″N 97°29′34″W | Brownsville | Recorded Texas Historic Landmark |
| 11 | Augustine Celaya House | Augustine Celaya House | April 11, 1986 (#86000726) | 504 E St. Francis St. 25°54′13″N 97°30′19″W | Brownsville | Recorded Texas Historic Landmark |
| 12 | Celaya-Creager House | Celaya-Creager House | May 5, 1988 (#88000523) | 441 E Washington St. 25°54′25″N 97°30′09″W | Brownsville | |
| 13 | Central Brownsville Historic District | | May 31, 2019 (#100004008) | Roughly bounded by E. Levee, E. 10th, E. Monroe, E. 14th & E. 15th Sts. & 2 blk. extension along 800 & 900 blks. of E. Elizabeth St. 25°54′10″N 97°29′51″W | Brownsville | |
| 14 | Lillian and George K. Aziz Essey House | | September 8, 2021 (#100006889) | 1205 West Elizabeth St. 25°55′03″N 97°30′57″W | Brownsville | |
| 15 | Fernandez and Laiseca Building | | May 11, 2018 (#100002433) | 1142-1154 Madison St. 25°54′13″N 97°29′44″W | Brownsville | |
| 16 | Miguel Fernandez Hide Yard | Miguel Fernandez Hide Yard | October 1, 1990 (#90001485) | 1101-1121 E Adams St. 25°54′11″N 97°29′51″W | Brownsville | also known as El Aleman |
| 17 | Fort Brown | Fort Brown | October 15, 1966 (#66000811) | S edge of Brownsville off International Blvd. 25°53′50″N 97°29′26″W | Brownsville | |
| 18 | M.E. and Estela Cueto Garcia House | M.E. and Estela Cueto Garcia House | June 5, 2017 (#100001038) | 155 Calle Anacua; 25°55′01″N 97°30′11″W | Brownsville | |
| 19 | Garcia Pasture Site | | February 23, 1972 (#72001355) | Address restricted | Port Isabel | |
| 20 | The Gem | The Gem | June 28, 1991 (#91000852) | 400 E 13th St. 25°54′00″N 97°29′52″W | Brownsville | Recorded Texas Historic Landmark |
| 21 | Cieta Friedman and Harry W. Hollowell House | | March 25, 2019 (#100003533) | 622 E. Saint Charles St. 25°54′13″N 97°30′14″W | Brownsville | |
| 22 | Hicks-Gregg House | Hicks-Gregg House | July 1, 2009 (#09000486) | 1249 W. Washington; 25°55′06″N 97°30′56″W | Brownsville | Recorded Texas Historic Landmark |
| 23 | Immaculate Conception Church | Immaculate Conception Church | March 26, 1980 (#80004085) | 1218 E Jefferson St. 25°54′09″N 97°29′45″W | Brownsville | Recorded Texas Historic Landmark |
| 24 | La Madrilena | La Madrilena | November 17, 1988 (#88002384) | 1002 E Madison; 25°54′17″N 97°29′49″W | Brownsville | Recorded Texas Historic Landmark |
| 25 | Manautou House | Manautou House | July 14, 1983 (#83003130) | 5 E Elizabeth St. 25°54′33″N 97°30′23″W | Brownsville | Recorded Texas Historic Landmark |
| 26 | McNair House | McNair House | November 24, 2015 (#15000836) | 39 Sunset Drive; 25°55′08″N 97°29′52″W | Brownsville | Recorded Texas Historic Landmark |
| 27 | Morris-Browne House | Morris-Browne House | October 25, 2006 (#06000955) | 204 E Levee St. 25°54′25″N 97°30′22″W | Brownsville | |
| 28 | La Nueva Libertad | La Nueva Libertad | April 11, 1986 (#84001628) | 1301 E Madison; 25°54′10″N 97°29′40″W | Brownsville | Recorded Texas Historic Landmark; also known as the Cueto Building |
| 29 | Palmito Ranch Battlefield | Palmito Ranch Battlefield | October 15, 1996 (#93000266) | Between TX 4 and the Rio Grande, 12 mi. E of Brownsville; 25°56′48″N 97°17′07″W | Brownsville | |
| 30 | Palmville | | October 20, 2021 (#100007077) | 1400 North Reagan St. 26°08′29″N 97°37′18″W | San Benito | |
| 31 | Palo Alto Battlefield National Historical Park | Palo Alto Battlefield National Historical Park | October 15, 1966 (#66000812) | 6.3 miles N of Brownsville at intersection of FM 1847 and FM 511; 26°01′04″N 97°28′50″W | Brownsville | |
| 32 | Point Isabel Lighthouse | Point Isabel Lighthouse | April 30, 1976 (#76002014) | Corner of TX 100 and Garcia St. 26°04′39″N 97°12′27″W | Port Isabel | State Antiquities Landmark |
| 33 | Resaca de la Palma Battlefield | Resaca de la Palma Battlefield | April 11, 1986 (#66000813) | North of intersection of Paredes Line Rd and Price Rd. 25°56′15″N 97°29′10″W | Brownsville | Now a portion of the Palo Alto Battlefield National Historical Park |
| 34 | Rio Grande Valley Gas Company Building | | August 8, 2022 (#100007983) | 355 West Elizabeth St. 25°54′42″N 97°30′35″W | Brownsville | |
| 35 | Southern Pacific Railroad Passenger Depot | Southern Pacific Railroad Passenger Depot | November 17, 1978 (#78002903) | 601 E Madison St. 25°54′27″N 97°29′57″W | Brownsville | Recorded Texas Historic Landmark |
| 36 | Charles Stillman House | Charles Stillman House | November 19, 1979 (#79003448) | 1305 E Washington St. 25°54′03″N 97°29′47″W | Brownsville | Recorded Texas Historic Landmark |
| 37 | Lucinda García and Tomás Tijerina House | | September 28, 2026 (#100013432) | 333 E. Adams St. 25°54′29″N 97°30′10″W | Brownsville | |

== Former listing ==
| | Name on the Register | Image | Date listed | Date removed | Location | City or town | Description |
|---|---|---|---|---|---|---|---|
| 1 | USS Cabot | USS Cabot | June 21, 1990 (#90000334) | August 7, 2001 | Port of Brownsville; 25°57′03″N 97°24′39″W | Brownsville | Previously berthed in New Orleans until 1999; scrapped in 2002 |

== See also ==
- National Register of Historic Places listings in Texas
- List of National Historic Landmarks in Texas
- Recorded Texas Historic Landmarks in Cameron County
