= Samuel Wallace Brooks =

American architect

Samuel Wallace Brooks (1829-February 15, 1903) was an American architect and engineer. His later career was in Brownsville, Texas. The home he built for himself, Samuel Brooks House, is listed on the National Register of Historic Places.

He was born in Pennsylvania and moved with his family to Ohio as a child. He lived in New Orleans before the American Civil War. In 1863 he moved to Matamoros in Tamaulipas where he lived until 1878, when he relocated across the Rio Grande to Brownsville, Texas. He designed the Post Hospital at Fort Brown. He was involved in levee building.

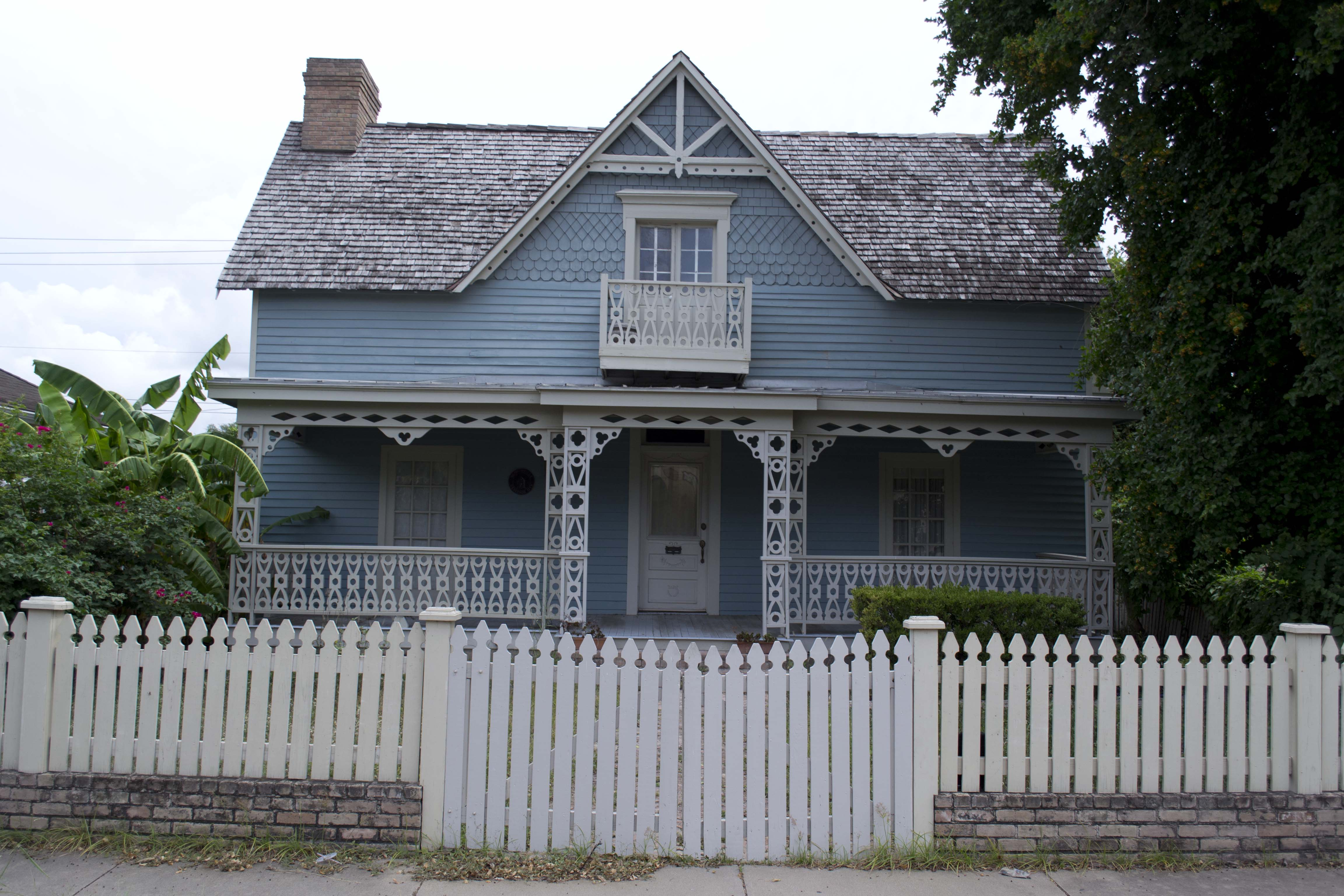
Samuel W. Brooks House in Brownsville, Texas

A historical marker commemorates the history of the S. W. Brooks Residence. It is at 623 East St. Charles Street in Brownsville.

He filed a patent for an improvement on machines making paving stones.

The University of Texas Rio Grande Valley has a collection of documents related to Brooks. It was moved in 1987.

== Works ==
- Post Hospital at 1825 May Street in Brownsville
- Second Starr County Courthouse (1886)
- Louis Kowalski House (1893) at 507 East Elizabeth Street Benjamin Kowalski served as mayor of Brownsville (List of mayors of Brownsville, Texas)

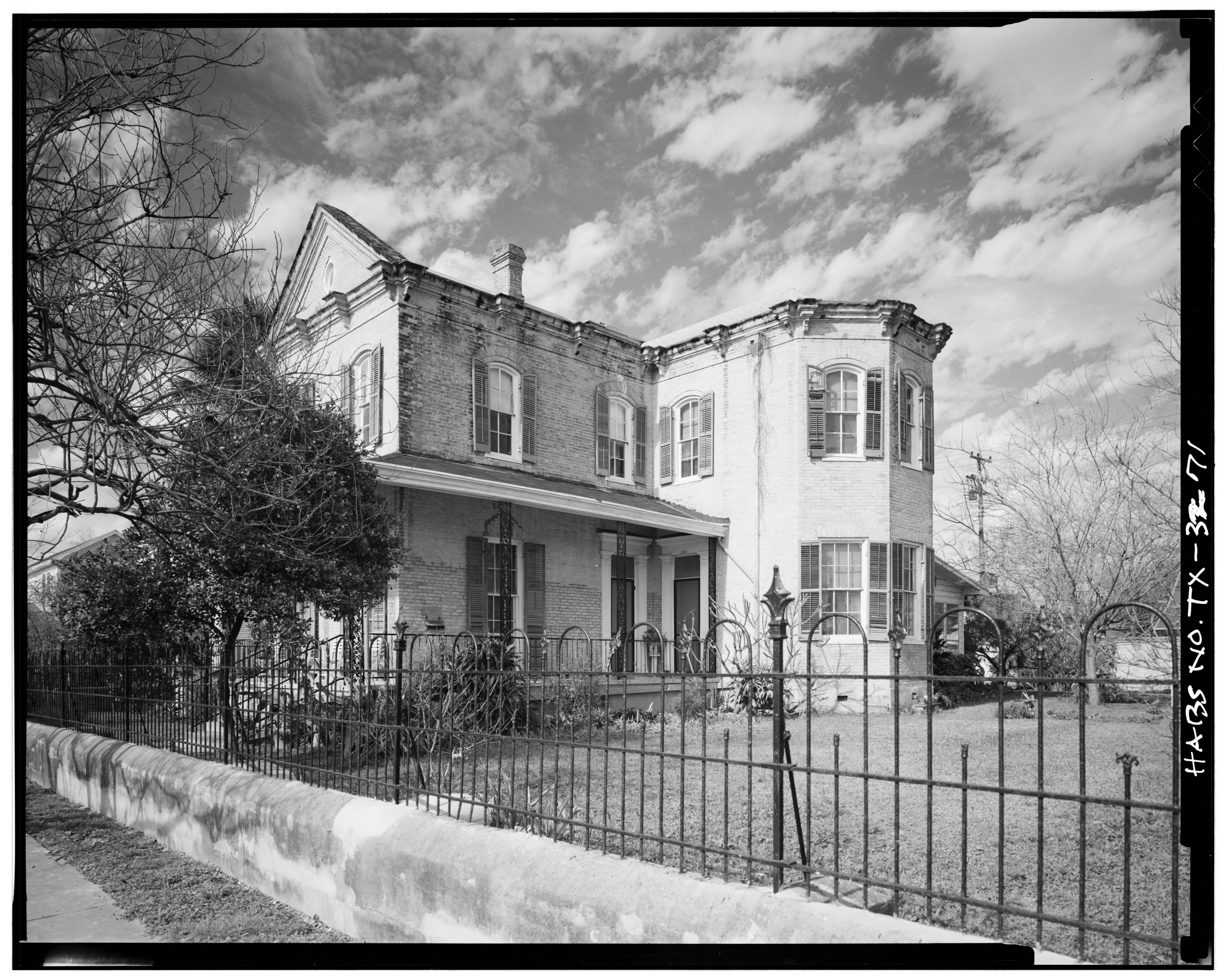
HABS photo of Browne-Wagner House

- Browne-Wagner House at 245 East Saint Charles Street
- Church of the Advent in Brownsville (1877), demolished
- Josephine G. Browne house (1894) in Brownsville
- Frank B. Armstrong house (1896) in Brownsville, demolished

== See also ==
- National Register of Historic Places listings in Cameron County, Texas
