= Dayton, Ohio =

Dayton
- City
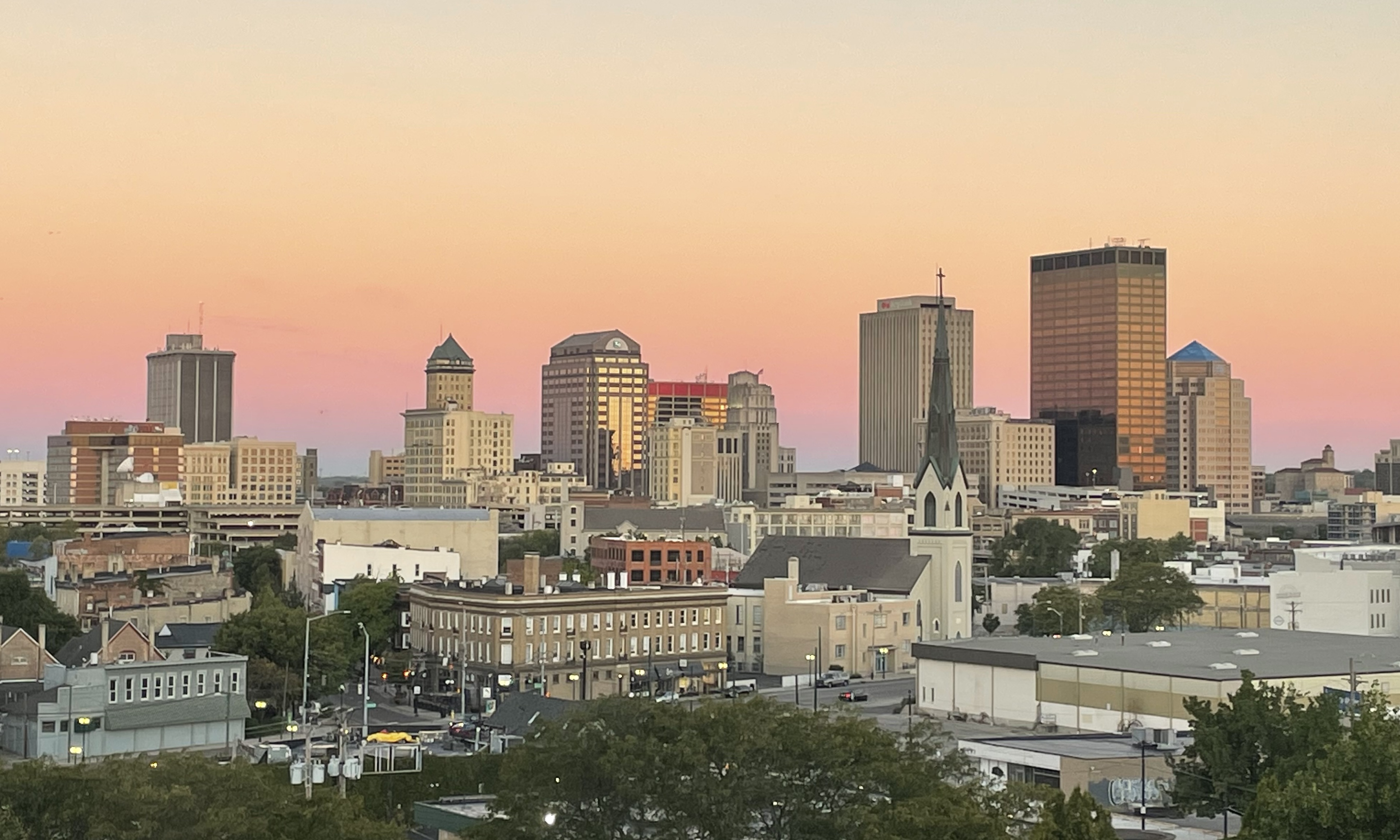
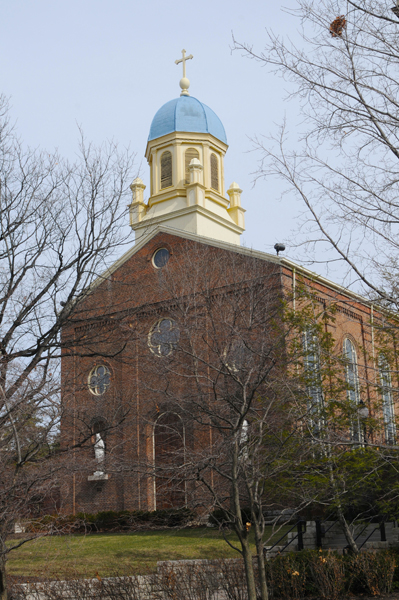
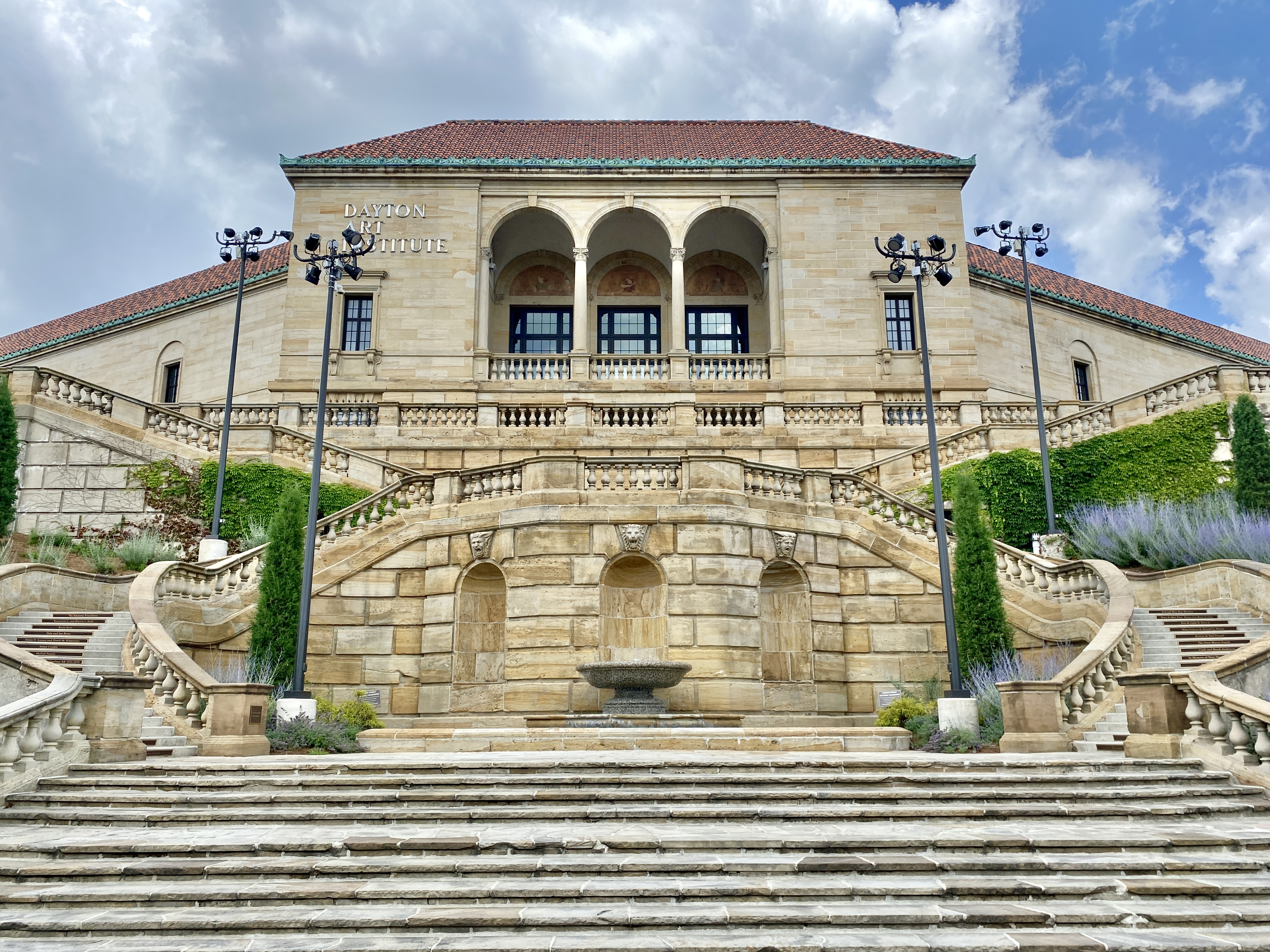
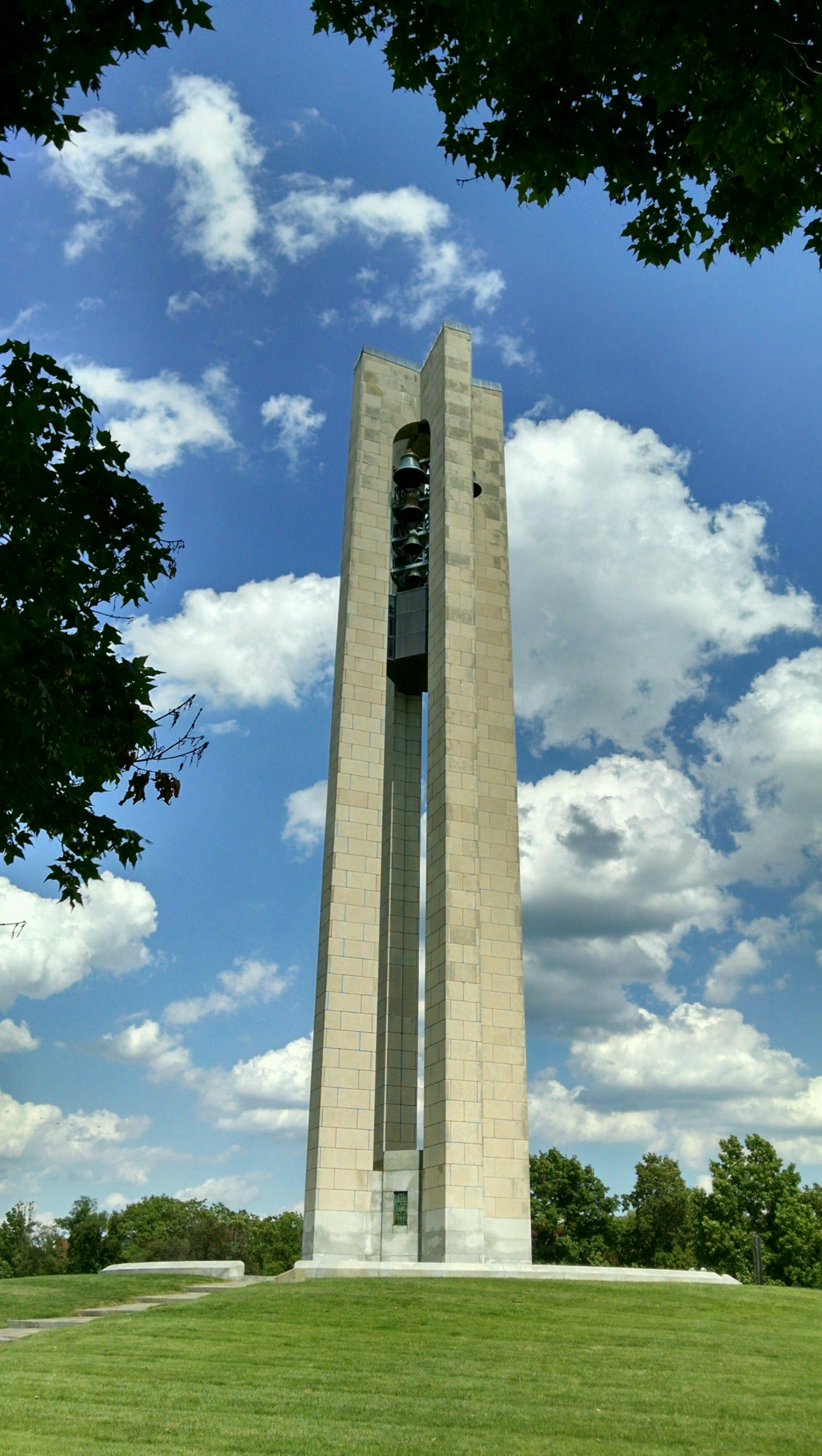
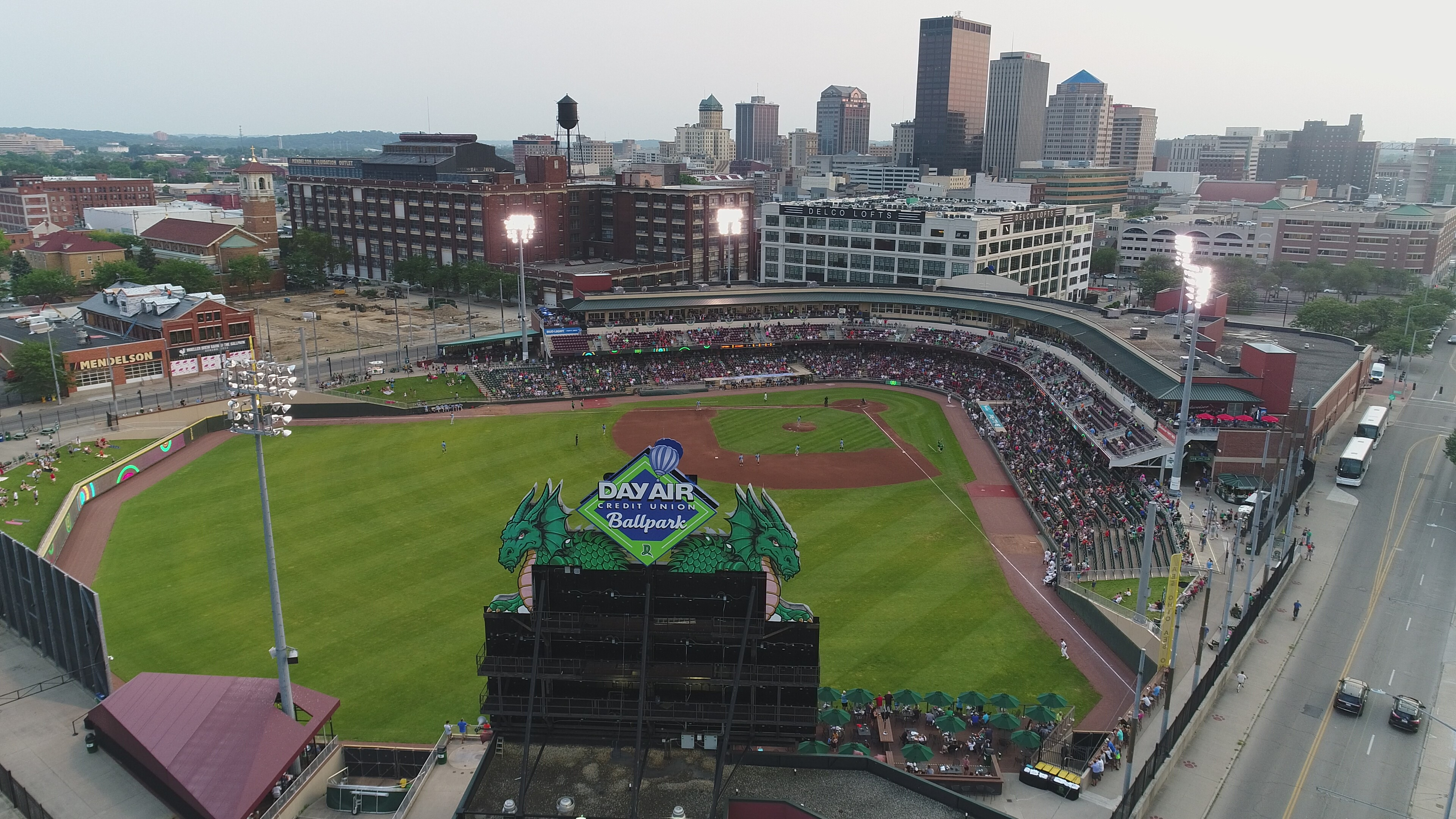
- Downtown Dayton University of Dayton Dayton Art Institute Deeds Carillon Day Air Ballpark

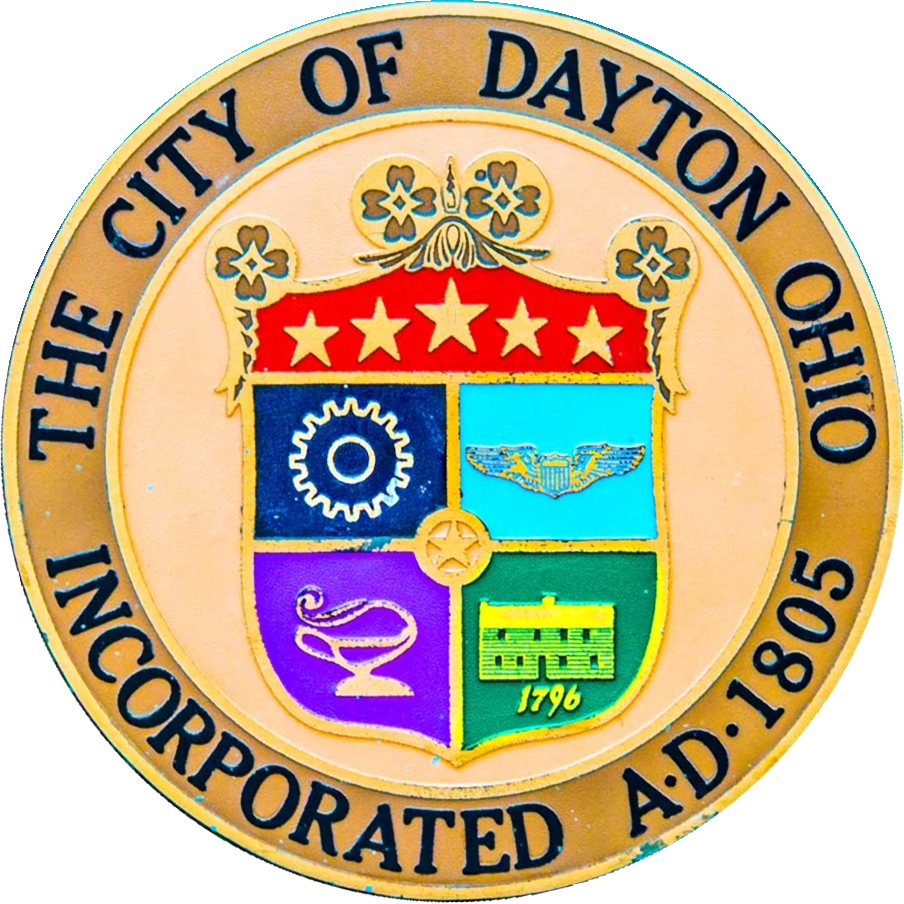
- Flag Seal Logo
- Nicknames: The Gem City, Birthplace of Aviation, The Land of Funk
- Interactive map of Dayton
- Location within Ohio Location within the United States
- Coordinates: 39°45′34″N 84°11′30″W
- Country: United States
- State: Ohio
- County: Montgomery
- Founded: 1796
- 1841 (city)
- Named for: Jonathan Dayton

Government
  - Mayor: Shenise Turner-Sloss (D)

Area
  - City: 56.96 sq mi (147.52 km^{2})
  - Land: 55.81 sq mi (144.54 km^{2})
  - Water: 1.15 sq mi (2.99 km^{2})
- Elevation: 742 ft (226 m)

Population (2020)
  - City: 137,644
  - Estimate (2025): 136,688 ▼
  - Density: 2,466.5/sq mi (952.31/km^{2})
  - Urban: 674,046 (US: 64th)
  - Urban density: 2,107/sq mi (813.6/km^{2})
  - Metro: 814,049 (US: 73rd)
- Demonym: Daytonian
- Time zone: UTC−5 (EST)
  - Summer (DST): UTC−4 (EDT)
- ZIP Codes: ZIP codes: 45390, 45401–45406, 45409–45410, 45412–45417, 45419-45420, 45422–45424, 45426, 45428-45435, 45437, 45439-45441, 45448-45449, 45458-45459, 45469-45470, 45475, 45479, 45481-45482, 45490
- Area codes: 937, 326
- FIPS code: 39113
- GNIS feature ID: 1086167
- Website: daytonohio.gov

Dayton (/ˈdeɪtən/) is a city in Montgomery County, Ohio, United States, and its county seat. It is the sixth-most populous city in Ohio, with a population of 137,644 at the time of 2020 United States census. The Dayton metropolitan area has an estimated 822,000 residents and is the state's fourth-largest metropolitan area. Dayton is located within Ohio's Miami Valley region, 40 miles (64 km) north of Cincinnati and 55 miles (89 km) southwest of Columbus, Ohio.

Dayton was founded in 1796 along the Great Miami River and named after Jonathan Dayton, a Founding Father of the United States who owned a significant amount of land in the area. It grew in the 19th century as a canal town and was home to many patents and inventors, most notably the Wright brothers, who developed the first successful motor-operated airplane. It later developed an industrialized economy and was home to the Dayton Project, a branch of the larger Manhattan Project, to develop the polonium triggers used in early atomic bombs.

With the decline of heavy manufacturing in the late 20th century, Dayton shifted from a manufacturing economy to more of a service economy. Ohio's borders are within 500 miles (800 km) of roughly 60 percent of the country's population and manufacturing infrastructure, making Dayton a logistics hub. The city is near Wright-Patterson Air Force Base, a significant contributor to research and development in the industrial, aeronautical, and astronautical engineering fields. Along with defense and aerospace, healthcare accounts for much of the Dayton area's economy. Significant institutions in Dayton include the Air Force Institute of Technology, Carillon Historical Park, the Dayton Art Institute, the Dayton Performing Arts Alliance, Wright State University, and the University of Dayton.

== History ==
Dayton was founded on April 1, 1796, by 12 settlers known as the Thompson Party. They traveled in March from Cincinnati up the Great Miami River by pirogue and landed at what is now St. Clair Street, where they found two small camps of Native Americans. Among the Thompson Party was Benjamin Van Cleve, whose memoirs provide insights into the Ohio Valley's history. Two other groups traveling overland arrived several days later. The oldest surviving building is Newcom Tavern, which was used for various purposes, including housing Dayton's first church, which is still in existence.

In 1797, Daniel C. Cooper laid out Mad River Road, the first overland connection between Cincinnati and Dayton, opening the "Mad River Country" to settlement. Ohio was admitted into the Union in 1803, and the village of Dayton was incorporated in 1805 and chartered as a city in 1841. The city was named after Jonathan Dayton, a captain in the American Revolutionary War who signed the U.S. Constitution and owned a significant amount of land in the area. In 1827, construction on the Dayton–Cincinnati canal began, which provided a better way to transport goods from Dayton to Cincinnati and contributed significantly to Dayton's economic growth during the 1800s.

=== Innovation ===
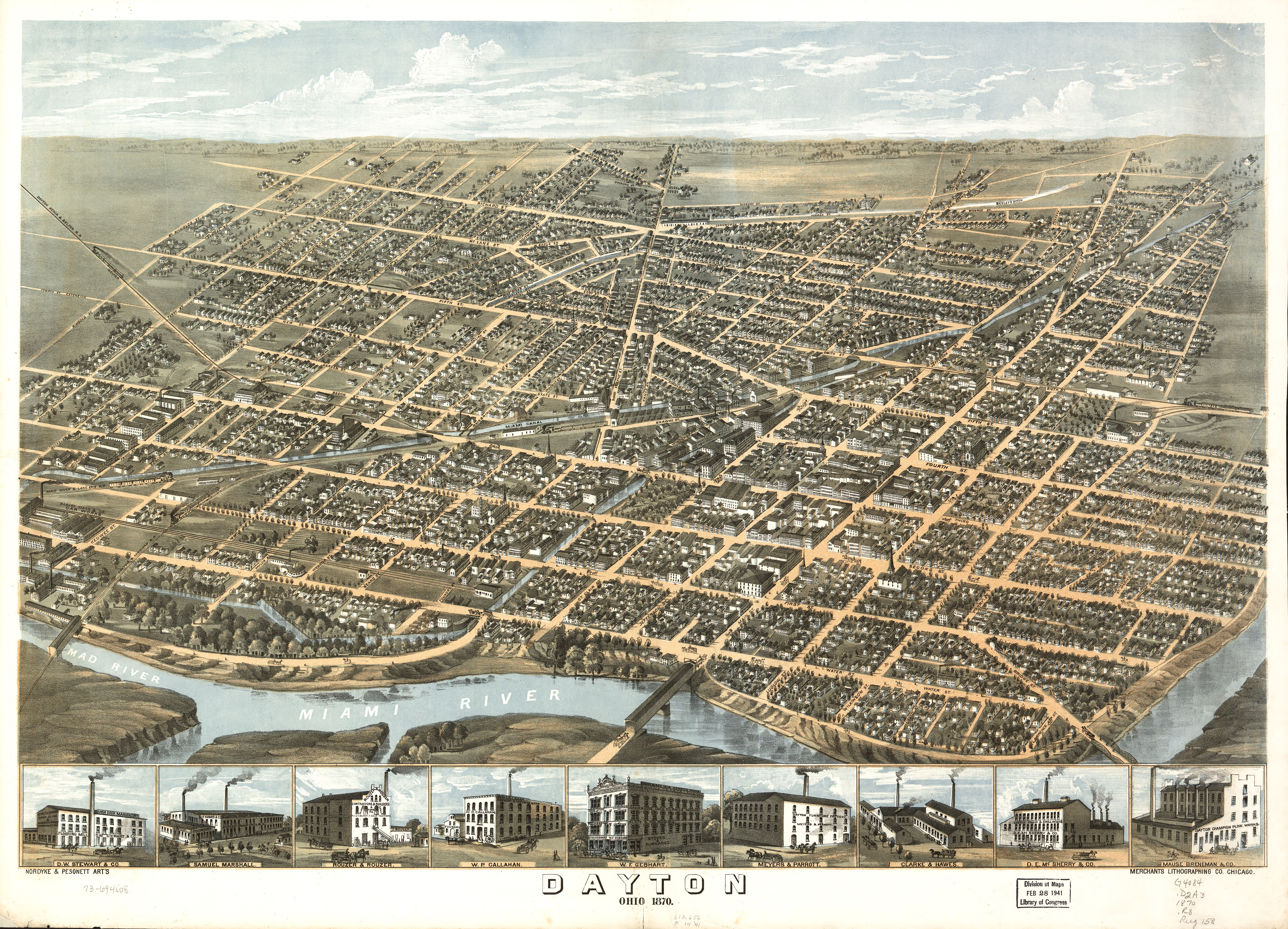
Dayton in 1870

Innovation led to business growth in the region. In 1884, John Henry Patterson acquired James Ritty's National Manufacturing Company along with his cash register patents and formed the National Cash Register Company (NCR). The company manufactured the first mechanical cash registers and played a crucial role in the shaping of Dayton's reputation as an epicenter for manufacturing in the early 1900s. In 1906, Charles F. Kettering, a leading engineer at the company, helped develop the first electric cash register, which propelled NCR into the national spotlight. NCR also helped develop the US Navy Bombe, a code-breaking machine that helped crack the Enigma machine cipher during World War II.

Dayton has been the home for many patents and inventions since the 1870s. According to the National Park Service, citing information from the U.S. Patent Office, Dayton had granted more patents per capita than any other U.S. city in 1890 and ranked fifth in the nation as early as 1870. The Wright brothers, inventors of the airplane, and Charles F. Kettering, world-renowned for his numerous inventions, hailed from Dayton. The city was also home to James Ritty's Incorruptible Cashier, the first mechanical cash register, and Arthur E. Morgan's hydraulic jump, a flood prevention mechanism that helped pioneer hydraulic engineering. Paul Laurence Dunbar, an African-American poet and novelist, penned his most famous works in the late 19th century and became an integral part of the city's history.

=== Birthplace of aviation ===
Powered aviation began in Dayton. Orville and Wilbur Wright were the first to construct and demonstrate powered flight. Although the first flight was in Kitty Hawk, North Carolina, their Wright Flyer was built in and returned to Dayton for improvements and further flights at Huffman Field, a cow pasture eight miles (13 km) northeast of Dayton, near the current Wright-Patterson Air Force Base.

When the government tried to move development to Langley Field in southern Virginia, six Dayton businessmen including Edward A. Deeds, formed the Dayton-Wright Airplane Company in Moraine and established a flying field. Deeds also opened a field to the north in the flood plain of the Great Miami River between the confluences of that river, the Stillwater River, and the Mad River (near downtown Dayton). Later named McCook Field for Alexander McDowell McCook, an American Civil War general, this became the Army Signal Corps' primary aviation research and training location. Wilbur Wright also purchased land near Huffman prairie to continue their research.

During World War I, the Army purchased 40 acres adjacent to Huffman Prairie for the Fairfield Aviation General Supply Depot. As airplanes developed more capability, they needed more runway space than McCook could offer, and a new location was sought. The Patterson family formed the Dayton Air Service Committee, Inc which held a campaign that raised $425,000 in two days and purchased 4,520.47 acres (18.2937 km^{2}) northeast of Dayton, including Wilbur Wright Field and the Huffman Prairie Flying Field. Wright Field was "formally dedicated" on October 12, 1927. After World War II, Wright Field and the adjacent Patterson Field, Dayton Army Air Field, and Clinton Army Air Field were merged as the Headquarters, Air Force Technical Base. On January 13, 1948, the facility was renamed Wright-Patterson Air Force Base.

=== Great Dayton Flood ===
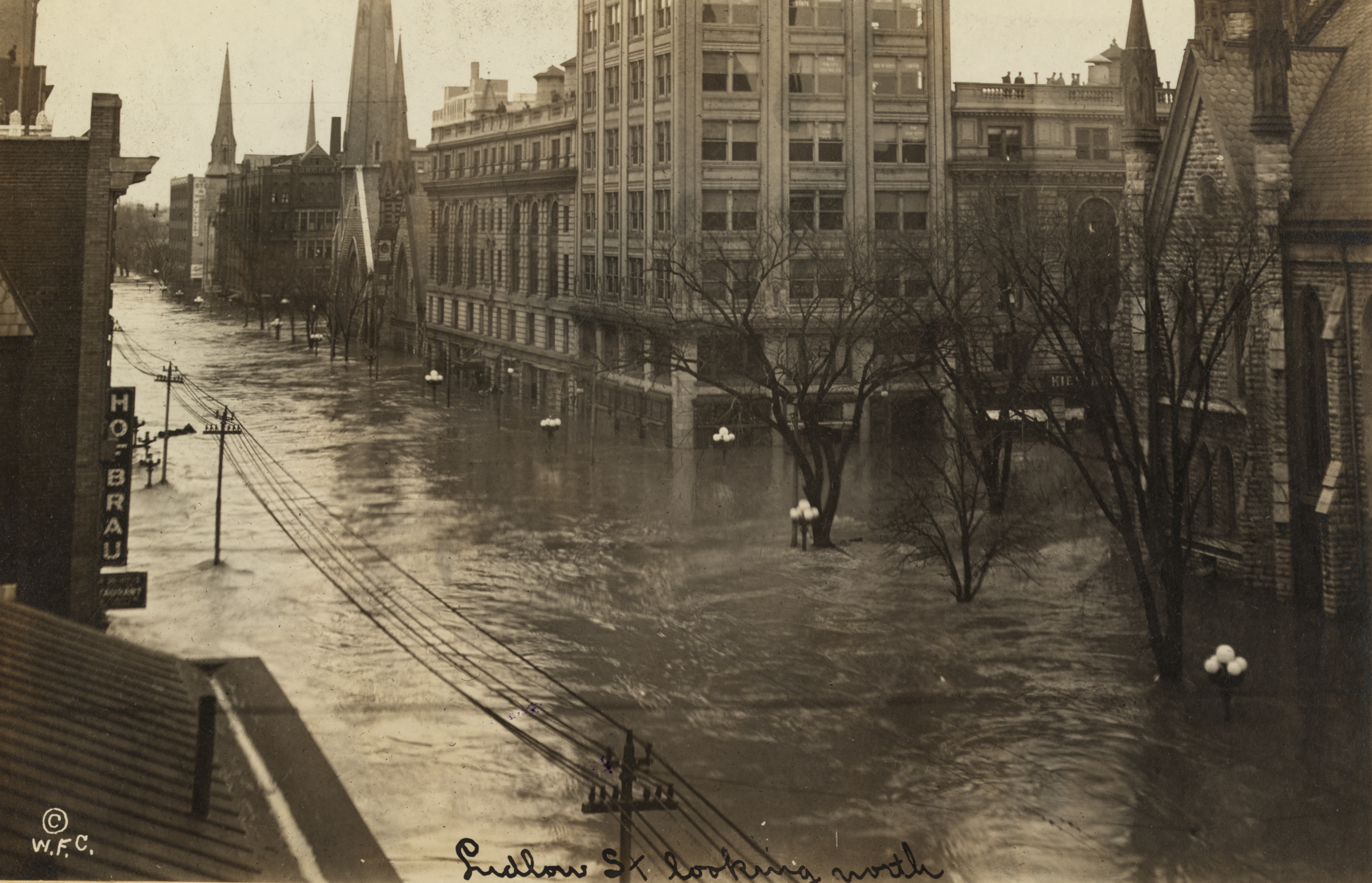
Flooding on Ludlow Street in downtown Dayton during the Great Dayton Flood, 1913

A catastrophic flood in March 1913, known as the Great Dayton Flood, led to the creation of the Miami Conservancy District, a series of dams as well as hydraulic pumps installed around Dayton, in 1914.

=== Contribution in World War Two ===
Like other cities across the country, Dayton was heavily involved in the war effort during World War II. Several locations around the city hosted the Dayton Project, a branch of the larger Manhattan Project, to develop polonium triggers used in early atomic bombs. The war efforts led to a manufacturing boom throughout the city, including high-demand for housing and other services. At one point, emergency housing was put into place due to a housing shortage in the region, much of which is still in use today.

Alan Turing is widely considered to be the father of theoretical computer science and artificial intelligence. He visited the National Cash Register (NCR) company in Dayton in December 1942. He was able to show that it was not necessary to build 336 Bombes, so the initial order was scaled down to 96 machines to decipher German Enigma-machine-encrypted secret messages during World War II.

=== Post-war Dayton ===
Between the 1940s and the 1970s, the city saw significant growth in suburban areas from population migration. Veterans were returning from military service in large numbers seeking industrial and manufacturing jobs, a part of the local industry that was expanding rapidly. Advancements in architecture also contributed to the suburban boom. New, modernized shopping centers and the Interstate Highway System allowed workers to commute greater distances and families to live further from the downtown area. More than 127,000 homes were built in Montgomery County during the 1950s.

During this time, the city was the site of several race riots, including one in 1955 following the murder of Emmett Till, the 1966 Dayton race riot, two in 1967 (following a speech by civil rights activist H. Rap Brown and another following the police killing of an African American man), and one in 1968 as part of the nationwide King assassination riots.

Since the 1980s, however, Dayton's population has declined, mainly due to the loss of manufacturing jobs and decentralization of metropolitan areas, as well as the national housing crisis that began in 2008. While much of the state has suffered for similar reasons, the impact on Dayton has been greater than most. By 2013, Dayton had the third-greatest percentage loss of population in the state since the 1980s, behind Cleveland and Youngstown. Despite this, Dayton has begun diversifying its workforce from manufacturing into other growing sectors such as healthcare and education.

=== Peace accords ===
In 1995, the Dayton Agreement, a peace accord between the parties to the hostilities of the conflict in Bosnia-Herzegovina and the former Yugoslavia, was negotiated at Wright-Patterson Air Force Base, near Fairborn, Ohio, from November 1 to 21. The agreement formally ended the conflict in the Republic of Bosnia and Herzegovina on December 14, 1995.

Richard Holbrooke wrote about these events in his memoirs:

There was also a real Dayton out there, a charming Ohio city, famous as the birthplace of the Wright brothers. Its citizens energized us from the outset. Unlike the population of, say, New York City, Geneva or Washington, which would scarcely notice another conference, Daytonians were proud to be part of history. Large signs at the commercial airport hailed Dayton as the "temporary center of international peace". The local newspapers and television stations covered the story from every angle, drawing the people deeper into the proceedings. When we ventured into a restaurant or a shopping center downtown, people crowded around, saying that they were praying for us. Warren Christopher was given at least one standing ovation in a restaurant. Families on the airbase placed "candles of peace" in their front windows, and people gathered in peace vigils outside the base. One day they formed a "peace chain", although it was not large enough to surround the sprawling eight-thousand-acre base. Ohio's famous ethnic diversity was on display.

=== 2000s initiatives ===
Downtown expansion that began in the 2000s has helped revitalize the city and encourage growth. Day Air Ballpark, home of the Dayton Dragons, was built in 2000. The highly successful minor league baseball team has been an integral part of Dayton's culture. In 2001, the city's public park system, Five Rivers MetroParks, built RiverScape MetroPark, an outdoor entertainment venue that attracts more than 400,000 visitors each year. A new performance arts theater, the Schuster Center, opened in 2003. A large health network in the region, Premier Health Partners, expanded its Miami Valley Hospital with a 12-story tower addition.

In 2010, the Downtown Dayton Partnership, in cooperation with the City of Dayton and community leaders, introduced the Greater Downtown Dayton Plan. It focuses on job creation and retention, infrastructure improvements, housing, recreation, and collaboration. The plan is to be implemented through the year 2020.

=== 2019 Shooting ===
In the early morning hours of August 4, 2019, just 13 hours after the El Paso Walmart shooting in Texas, a mass shooting occurred near the Ned Peppers Bar, a bar located in the Oregon Historic District. The perpetrator, 24-year old Connor Betts, shot and killed 9 people, including his own sister, while injuring another 27, before subsequently getting shot and killed by responding police officers, just as he was about to enter Ned Peppers Bar. It’s the second deadliest mass shooting in Ohio history, behind only the 1975 Easter Sunday Massacre.

=== Nicknames ===
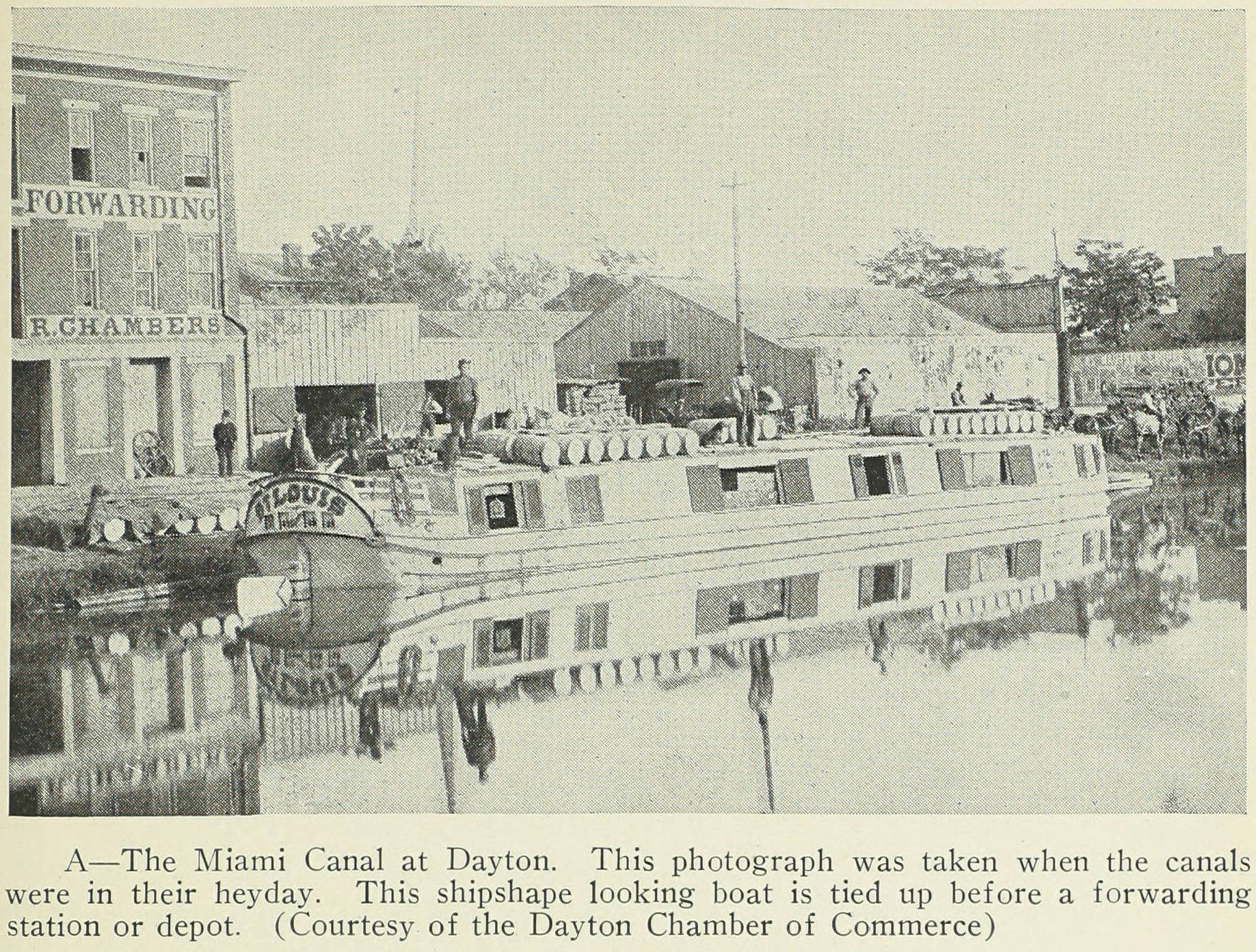
A photograph of the Miami and Erie Canal from Geography of Ohio, 1923

Dayton is known as the "Gem City". The nickname's origin is uncertain, but several theories exist. In the early 19th century, a well-known racehorse named Gem hailed from Dayton. In 1845, an article published in the Cincinnati Daily Chronicle by an author known as T stated:

In a small bend of the Great Miami River, with canals on the east and south, it can be fairly said, without infringing on the rights of others, that Dayton is the gem of all our interior towns. It possesses wealth, refinement, enterprise, and a beautiful country, beautifully developed.

In the late 1840s, Major William D. Bickham of the Dayton Journal began a campaign to nickname Dayton the "Gem City". The name was adopted by the city's Board of Trade several years later. Paul Laurence Dunbar referred to the nickname in his poem, "Toast to Dayton", as noted in the following excerpt:

She shall ever claim our duty,
For she shines—the brightest gem
That has ever decked with beauty
Dear Ohio's diadem.

Dayton also plays a role in a nickname given to the state of Ohio, "Birthplace of Aviation". Dayton is the hometown of the Wright brothers, aviation pioneers who are credited with inventing and building the first practical airplane in history. After their first manned flights in Kitty Hawk, North Carolina, which they had chosen due to its ideal weather and climate conditions, the Wrights returned to Dayton and continued testing at nearby Huffman Prairie.

Additionally, Dayton is colloquially referred to as "Little Detroit". This nickname comes from Dayton's prominence as a Midwestern manufacturing center.

== Geography ==
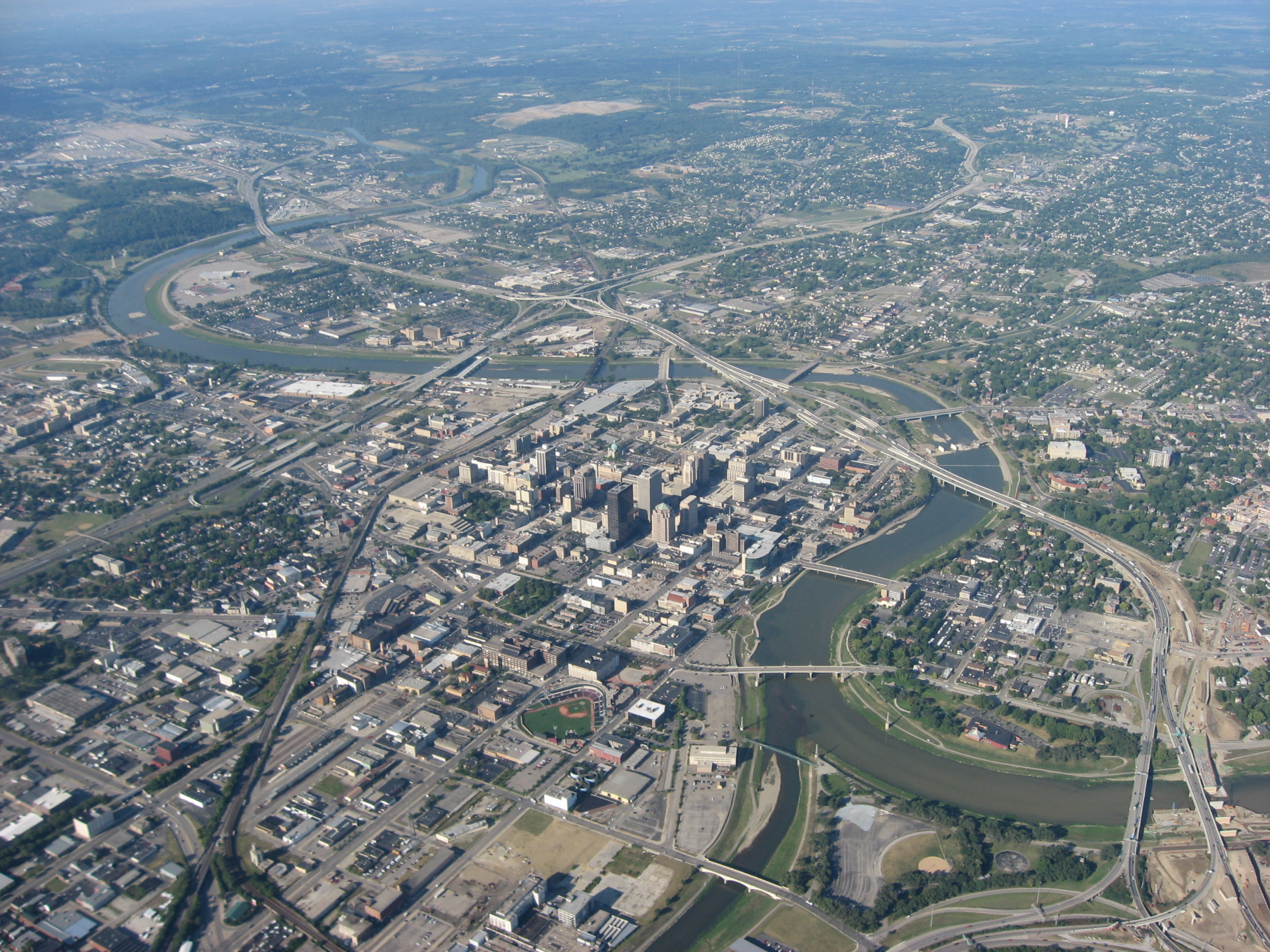
Aerial view of Downtown Dayton (NE to SW)

According to the United States Census Bureau, the city has a total area of 56.50 square miles (146.33 km^{2}), of which 55.65 square miles (144.13 km^{2}) is land and 0.85 square miles (2.20 km^{2}) is water.

=== Climate ===
Dayton's climate features hot, humid summers and cold winters, and is classified as a humid continental climate (Köppen Dfa). Unless otherwise noted, all normal figures quoted within the text below are from the official climatology station, Dayton International Airport, at an elevation of 1,000 ft (304.8 m) about 10 mi (16 km) to the north of downtown Dayton, which lies within the valley of the Miami River; thus temperatures there are typically cooler than in downtown.

At the airport, monthly mean temperatures range from 27.5 °F (−2.5 °C) in January to 74.1 °F (23.4 °C) in July. The highest temperature ever recorded in Dayton was 108 °F (42 °C) on July 22, 1901, and the coldest was −28 °F (−33 °C) on February 13 during the Great Blizzard of 1899. On average, there are 14 days of 90 °F (32 °C)+ highs and 4.5 nights of sub-0 °F (−18 °C) lows annually. Snow is moderate, with a normal seasonal accumulation of 23.3 in (59 cm), (Note: This is far less than the snowbelt regions of northeast Ohio due to distance from the Great Lakes and slightly less than the generally warmer Columbus.) usually occurring from November to March, occasionally April, and rarely October. Precipitation averages 41.1 inches (1,040 mm) annually, with total rainfall peaking in May.

Dayton is subject to severe weather typical of the Midwestern United States. Tornadoes are possible from the spring to the fall. Floods, blizzards, and severe thunderstorms can also occur.

On Memorial Day of 2019, Dayton suffered extensive property damage and one death during a tornado outbreak, in which a total of 15 tornadoes touched down in the Dayton area. Although some of the tornadoes were only EF0 and remained on the ground for less than a mile, one was an EF4 measuring a half-mile-wide (805 meters), which tore through the communities of Brookville, Trotwood, Dayton, Northridge, and Riverside. Several streets were closed, including portions of I-75 and North Dixie Drive in Northridge. 64,000 residents lost power and much of the region's water supply was cut off.

Climate data for Dayton, Ohio (Dayton International Airport), 1991–2020 normals, (Note: Mean monthly maxima and minima (i.e. the expected highest and lowest temperature readings at any point during the year or given month) calculated based on data at said location from 1991 to 2020.) extremes 1893–present (Note: Official records for Dayton were kept at the Dayton COOP from June 1893 to July 9, 1911, alternating between the Weather Bureau Office and Miami Conservancy District from July 10, 1911, to December 1947, and at Dayton Int'l since January 1948. For more information, see Threadex)
Month	Jan	Feb	Mar	Apr	May	Jun	Jul	Aug	Sep	Oct	Nov	Dec	Year
Record high °F (°C)	75 (24)	76 (24)	87 (31)	90 (32)	98 (37)	102 (39)	108 (42)	103 (39)	102 (39)	94 (34)	79 (26)	72 (22)	108 (42)
Mean maximum °F (°C)	58.6 (14.8)	63.0 (17.2)	71.9 (22.2)	80.4 (26.9)	86.6 (30.3)	91.9 (33.3)	92.7 (33.7)	91.8 (33.2)	89.4 (31.9)	82.3 (27.9)	69.7 (20.9)	61.3 (16.3)	94.1 (34.5)
Mean daily maximum °F (°C)	37.1 (2.8)	41.2 (5.1)	51.5 (10.8)	64.5 (18.1)	74.2 (23.4)	82.6 (28.1)	85.9 (29.9)	84.6 (29.2)	78.6 (25.9)	66.2 (19.0)	52.7 (11.5)	41.5 (5.3)	63.4 (17.4)
Daily mean °F (°C)	29.4 (−1.4)	32.8 (0.4)	42.1 (5.6)	53.7 (12.1)	64.0 (17.8)	72.7 (22.6)	76.0 (24.4)	74.5 (23.6)	67.7 (19.8)	56.0 (13.3)	44.1 (6.7)	34.3 (1.3)	53.9 (12.2)
Mean daily minimum °F (°C)	21.8 (−5.7)	24.5 (−4.2)	32.7 (0.4)	42.9 (6.1)	53.8 (12.1)	62.7 (17.1)	66.1 (18.9)	64.3 (17.9)	56.8 (13.8)	45.9 (7.7)	35.4 (1.9)	27.1 (−2.7)	44.5 (6.9)
Mean minimum °F (°C)	−1.7 (−18.7)	4.0 (−15.6)	13.4 (−10.3)	25.2 (−3.8)	37.4 (3.0)	48.7 (9.3)	53.9 (12.2)	52.1 (11.2)	41.9 (5.5)	30.2 (−1.0)	19.4 (−7.0)	7.4 (−13.7)	−4.6 (−20.3)
Record low °F (°C)	−25 (−32)	−28 (−33)	−7 (−22)	15 (−9)	26 (−3)	40 (4)	44 (7)	40 (4)	30 (−1)	18 (−8)	−2 (−19)	−20 (−29)	−28 (−33)
Average precipitation inches (mm)	3.08 (78)	2.35 (60)	3.50 (89)	4.46 (113)	4.51 (115)	4.14 (105)	3.95 (100)	2.96 (75)	3.31 (84)	2.95 (75)	3.07 (78)	3.05 (77)	41.33 (1,050)
Average snowfall inches (cm)	8.3 (21)	6.6 (17)	3.9 (9.9)	0.4 (1.0)	0.0 (0.0)	0.0 (0.0)	0.0 (0.0)	0.0 (0.0)	0.0 (0.0)	0.2 (0.51)	0.8 (2.0)	4.8 (12)	25.0 (64)
Average precipitation days (≥ 0.01 in)	13.4	11.3	12.1	13.0	14.1	11.9	10.6	8.1	8.6	9.5	9.9	11.8	134.3
Average snowy days (≥ 0.1 in)	7.6	6.4	3.2	1.0	0.0	0.0	0.0	0.0	0.0	0.2	1.2	4.9	24.5
Average relative humidity (%)	72.7	72.0	69.5	64.2	65.1	66.0	68.8	71.5	71.9	69.3	73.3	75.8	70.0
Mean monthly sunshine hours	134.0	136.6	178.4	213.2	263.1	293.7	296.2	277.4	237.6	192.9	115.7	99.9	2,438.7
Percentage possible sunshine	45	46	48	54	59	65	65	65	64	56	39	34	55
Source: NOAA (relative humidity and sun 1961–1990)

Climate data for Dayton, Ohio (Miami Conservancy District, downtown), 1991–2020 normals, (Note: Mean monthly maxima and minima (i.e. the expected highest and lowest temperature readings at any point during the year or given month) calculated based on data at said location from 1991 to 2020.) extremes 1893–present (Note: The station location is 39.7636°N 84.1915°W, less than 100 m (330 ft) from the banks of the Miami River.)
Month	Jan	Feb	Mar	Apr	May	Jun	Jul	Aug	Sep	Oct	Nov	Dec	Year
Record high °F (°C)	75 (24)	77 (25)	88 (31)	90 (32)	98 (37)	103 (39)	108 (42)	105 (41)	102 (39)	93 (34)	81 (27)	72 (22)	108 (42)
Mean maximum °F (°C)	60.8 (16.0)	65.8 (18.8)	74.9 (23.8)	83.7 (28.7)	90.5 (32.5)	95.5 (35.3)	96.9 (36.1)	95.9 (35.5)	93.1 (33.9)	85.0 (29.4)	72.1 (22.3)	63.4 (17.4)	98.0 (36.7)
Mean daily maximum °F (°C)	36.3 (2.4)	40.2 (4.6)	50.7 (10.4)	64.3 (17.9)	74.9 (23.8)	83.6 (28.7)	86.7 (30.4)	85.8 (29.9)	79.2 (26.2)	66.1 (18.9)	52.0 (11.1)	40.9 (4.9)	63.4 (17.4)
Daily mean °F (°C)	28.2 (−2.1)	31.4 (−0.3)	40.6 (4.8)	52.9 (11.6)	63.9 (17.7)	73.0 (22.8)	76.2 (24.6)	74.8 (23.8)	67.5 (19.7)	54.8 (12.7)	42.6 (5.9)	33.2 (0.7)	53.3 (11.8)
Mean daily minimum °F (°C)	20.1 (−6.6)	22.6 (−5.2)	30.6 (−0.8)	41.4 (5.2)	52.9 (11.6)	62.4 (16.9)	65.7 (18.7)	63.9 (17.7)	55.8 (13.2)	43.5 (6.4)	33.1 (0.6)	25.6 (−3.6)	43.1 (6.2)
Mean minimum °F (°C)	1.7 (−16.8)	7.2 (−13.8)	15.2 (−9.3)	27.5 (−2.5)	39.2 (4.0)	51.0 (10.6)	57.0 (13.9)	55.5 (13.1)	44.5 (6.9)	31.9 (−0.1)	21.8 (−5.7)	10.6 (−11.9)	−0.7 (−18.2)
Record low °F (°C)	−21 (−29)	−28 (−33)	0 (−18)	15 (−9)	28 (−2)	37 (3)	45 (7)	37 (3)	29 (−2)	18 (−8)	0 (−18)	−16 (−27)	−28 (−33)
Average precipitation inches (mm)	3.17 (81)	2.35 (60)	3.54 (90)	4.45 (113)	4.38 (111)	4.41 (112)	4.03 (102)	3.12 (79)	3.03 (77)	3.00 (76)	3.04 (77)	3.13 (80)	41.65 (1,058)
Average snowfall inches (cm)	6.9 (18)	1.5 (3.8)	1.7 (4.3)	0.0 (0.0)	0.0 (0.0)	0.0 (0.0)	0.0 (0.0)	0.0 (0.0)	0.0 (0.0)	0.0 (0.0)	0.1 (0.25)	2.1 (5.3)	12.3 (31)
Average precipitation days (≥ 0.01 in)	12.2	10.1	11.4	13.0	13.5	12.1	10.0	8.3	8.0	9.3	9.5	11.0	128.4
Average snowy days (≥ 0.1 in)	4.1	2.3	0.8	0.0	0.0	0.0	0.0	0.0	0.0	0.0	0.2	2.3	9.7
Source: NOAA

=== Ecology ===
The Dayton Audubon Society is the National Audubon Society's local chapter. The Dayton chapter manages local activities contributing to the annual, hemisphere-wide Christmas Bird Count. The Chapter began participation in the National Count in 1924. The local Count was initially coordinated by Ben Blincoe, who was succeeded by Jim Hill in 1970. In the mid-1960s, the freezing of Lake Erie and associated marshlands led species of waterfowl to appear in the Dayton-area, where surface waters remained unfrozen. Nine varieties of birds have been observed every year in the Dayton area: downy woodpecker, Carolina chickadee, tufted titmouse, brown creeper, northern cardinal, dark-eyed junco, American tree sparrow, song sparrow and American crow.

=== Cityscape ===
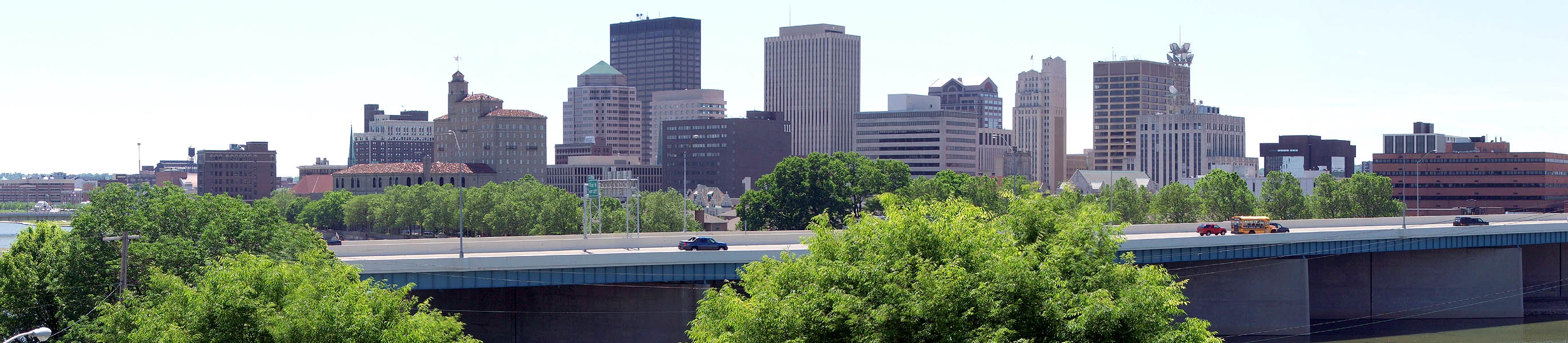
Panorama of Dayton

==== Architecture ====
Unlike many Midwestern cities its age, Dayton has very broad and straight downtown streets (generally two or three full lanes in each direction) that improved access to the downtown even after the automobile became popular. The main reason for the broad streets was that Dayton was a marketing and shipping center from its beginning; streets were broad to enable wagons drawn by teams of three to four pairs of oxen to turn around. Also, some of today's streets were once barge canals flanked by draw-paths.

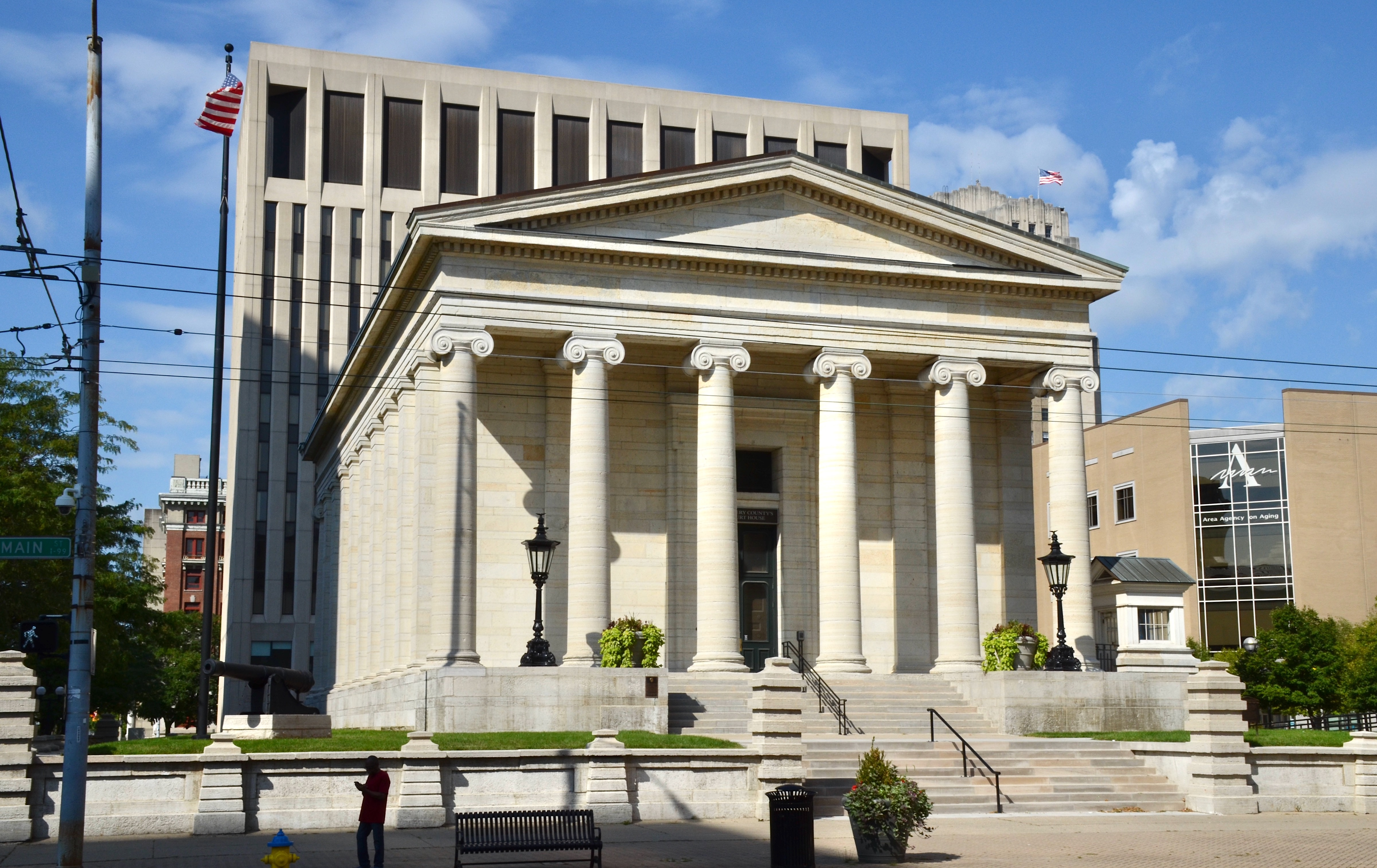
The Old Montgomery County Courthouse, built in 1847

A courthouse building was built in downtown Dayton in 1888 to supplement Dayton's original Neoclassical courthouse, which still stands. This second, "new" courthouse has since been replaced with new facilities as well as a park. The Old Court House has been a favored political campaign stop. On September 17, 1859, Abraham Lincoln delivered an address on its steps. Eight other presidents have visited the courthouse, either as presidents or during presidential campaigns: Andrew Johnson, James Garfield, John F. Kennedy, Lyndon B. Johnson, Richard Nixon, Gerald Ford, Ronald Reagan, and Bill Clinton.

The Dayton Arcade, which opened on March 3, 1904, was built in the hopes of replacing open-air markets throughout the city. Throughout the decades, the Arcade has gone through many transformations but has retained its charm. Some of its main features include a Flemish facade at the Third Street entrance, a glass dome above the Arcade rotunda, and a chateau roof line above the Third Street facade. The Dayton Arcade is currently under renovations with no official completion date set.

In 2009, the CareSource Management Group finished construction of a $55 million corporate headquarters in downtown Dayton. The 300,000-square-foot (28,000 m^{2}), 10-story building was downtown's first new office tower in more than a decade.

Dayton's two tallest buildings are the Kettering Tower at 408 ft (124 m) and the KeyBank Tower at 385 ft (117 m). Kettering Tower was originally Winters Tower, the headquarters of Winters Bank. The building was renamed after Virginia Kettering when Winters was merged into Bank One. KeyBank Tower was known as the MeadWestvaco Tower before KeyBank gained naming rights to the building in 2008.

Ted Rall said in 2015 that over the last five decades Dayton has been demolishing some of its architecturally significant buildings to reduce the city's rental vacancy rate and thus increase the occupancy rate.

==== Neighborhoods ====
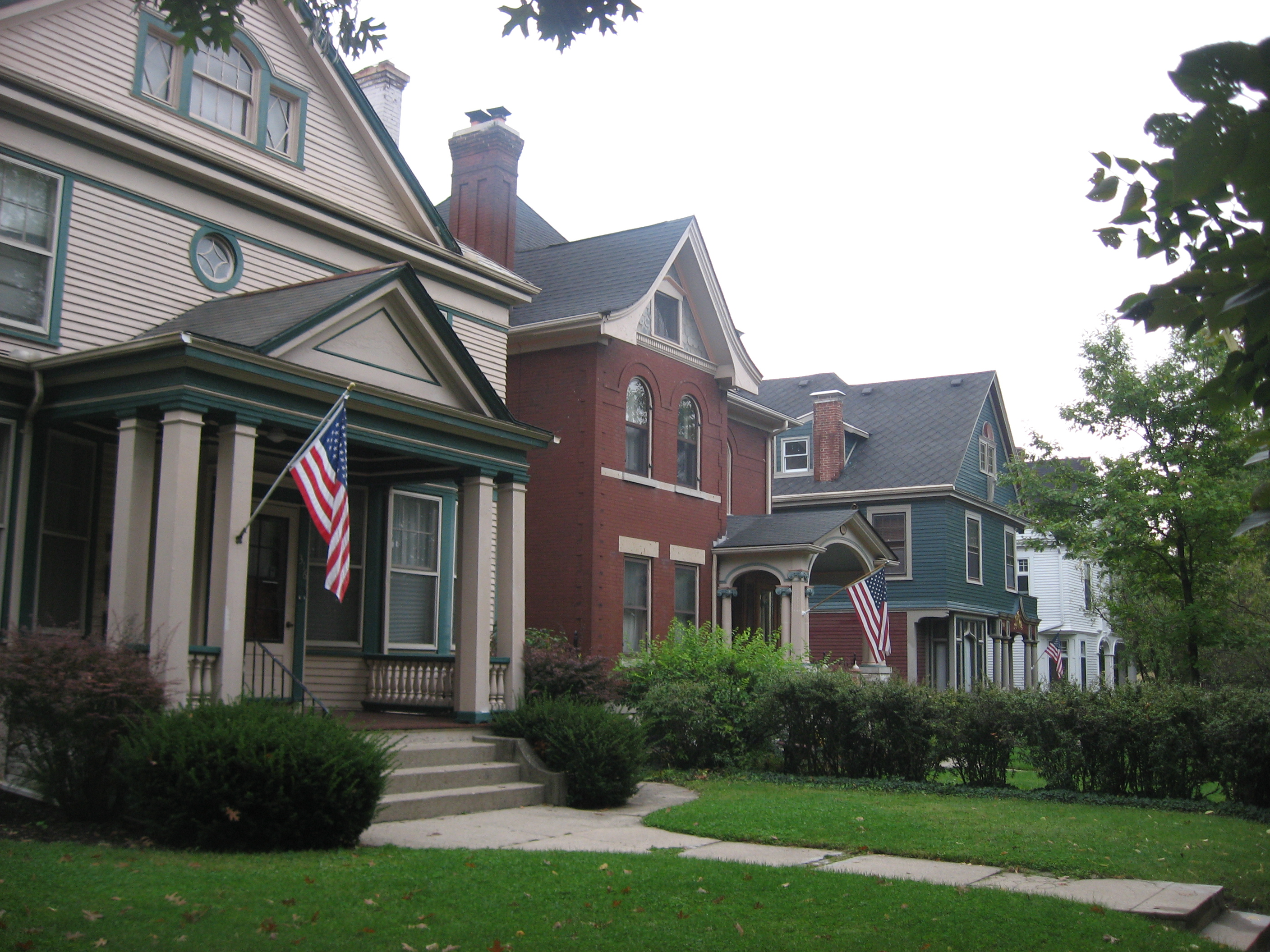
The Central Avenue Historic District in Grafton Hill

Dayton's ten historic neighborhoods—Oregon District, Wright Dunbar, Dayton View, Grafton Hill, McPherson Town, Webster Station, Huffman, Kenilworth, St. Anne's Hill, and South Park—feature mostly single-family houses and mansions in the Neoclassical, Jacobethan, Tudor Revival, English Gothic, Chateauesque, Craftsman, Queen Anne, Georgian Revival, Colonial Revival, Renaissance Revival Architecture, Shingle Style Architecture, Prairie, Mission Revival, Eastlake/Italianate, American Foursquare, and Federal styles. Downtown Dayton is also a large area that encompasses several neighborhoods itself and has seen a recent uplift and revival.

==== Suburbs ====
Dayton's suburbs with a population of 10,000 or more include Beavercreek, Centerville, Clayton, Englewood, Fairborn, Harrison Township, Huber Heights, Kettering, Miami Township, Miamisburg, Oakwood, Riverside, Springboro, Trotwood, Vandalia, Washington Township, West Carrollton, and Xenia.

In the federal government's National Urban Policy and New Community Development Act of 1970, funding was provided for thirteen "new towns" or planned cities throughout the country. One location was set to become a suburb of Dayton and was known variously as Brookwood or Newfields. The goal was to have an entirely new suburb that would eventually house about 35,000 residents. The new town was to be located between Trotwood and Brookville, and modeled on the ideas of Ian McHarg. The project was abandoned in 1978 and most of the land became Sycamore State Park.

== Demographics ==
Historical population
Census	Pop.	Note	%±
1810	383		—
1820	1,000		161.1%
1830	2,950		195.0%
1840	6,067		105.7%
1850	10,977		80.9%
1860	20,081		82.9%
1870	30,473		51.8%
1880	38,678		26.9%
1890	61,220		58.3%
1900	85,333		39.4%
1910	116,577		36.6%
1920	152,559		30.9%
1930	200,982		31.7%
1940	210,718		4.8%
1950	243,872		15.7%
1960	262,332		7.6%
1970	243,601		−7.1%
1980	203,371		−16.5%
1990	182,044		−10.5%
2000	166,179		−8.7%
2010	141,759		−14.7%
2020	137,644		−2.9%
2025 (est.)	136,688		−0.7%
United States Census Bureau

Dayton's city proper population declined significantly from a peak of 262,332 residents in 1960 to 137,644 residents in 2020. This was in part due to the slowdown of the region's manufacturing sector. The metropolitan area as a whole has experienced both population growth and decreases since 1960, with the overall trend leaning towards growth for the metro area. The city's most populous ethnic group, white, declined from 78.1% in 1960 to 51.7% by 2010.

=== Racial and ethnic composition ===
Dayton city, Ohio – Racial and ethnic composition Note: the US Census treats Hispanic/Latino as an ethnic category. This table excludes Latinos from the racial categories and assigns them to a separate category. Hispanics/Latinos may be of any race.
Race / Ethnicity (NH = Non-Hispanic)	Pop 1980	Pop 1990	Pop 2000	Pop 2010	Pop 2020	% 1980	% 1990	% 2000	% 2010	% 2020
White alone (NH)	125,436	105,526	87,487	71,458	64,020	61.68%	57.97%	52.65%	50.49%	46.51%
Black or African American alone (NH)	74,749	73,360	71,291	60,342	55,620	36.75%	40.30%	42.90%	42.64%	40.41%
Native American or Alaska Native alone (NH)	280	385	475	373	305	0.14%	0.21%	0.29%	0.26%	0.22%
Asian alone (NH)	813	1,138	1,041	1,195	1,922	0.40%	0.63%	0.63%	0.84%	1.40%
Native Hawaiian or Pacific Islander alone (NH)	x	x	55	47	73	x	x	0.03%	0.03%	0.05%
Other race alone (NH)	328	279	411	265	837	0.16%	0.15%	0.25%	0.19%	0.61%
Mixed race or Multiracial (NH)	x	x	2,793	3,667	7,008	x	x	1.68%	2.59%	5.09%
Hispanic or Latino (any race)	1,765	1,356	2,626	4,180	7,859	0.87%	0.74%	1.58%	2.95%	5.71%
Total	203,371	182,044	166,179	141,527	137,644	100.00%	100.00%	100.00%	100.00%	100.00%

=== 2020 census ===
As of the 2020 census, Dayton had a population of 137,644. The median age was 34.9 years. 22.1% of residents were under the age of 18 and 13.8% of residents were 65 years of age or older. For every 100 females there were 95.4 males, and for every 100 females age 18 and over there were 93.4 males age 18 and over.

99.9% of residents lived in urban areas, while 0.1% lived in rural areas.

There were 57,751 households in Dayton, of which 25.6% had children under the age of 18 living in them. Of all households, 23.7% were married-couple households, 28.5% were households with a male householder and no spouse or partner present, and 39.2% were households with a female householder and no spouse or partner present. About 41.1% of all households were made up of individuals and 13.4% had someone living alone who was 65 years of age or older.

There were 68,899 housing units, of which 16.2% were vacant. The homeowner vacancy rate was 2.2% and the rental vacancy rate was 10.8%.

According to the U.S. Census American Community Survey, for the period 2016–2020 the estimated median annual income for a household in the city was $43,780, and the median income for a family was $60,408. About 25.4% of the population were living below the poverty line, including 39.5% of those under age 18 and 21.5% of those age 65 or over. About 53.6% of the population were employed, and 24.4% had a bachelor's degree or higher.

=== 2010 census ===
As of the 2010 census, there were 141,759 people, 58,404 households, and 31,064 families residing in the city. The population density was 2,543.2 inhabitants per square mile (981.9/km^{2}). There were 74,065 housing units at an average density of 1,330.9 per square mile (513.9/km^{2}). The racial makeup of the city was 51.7% White, 42.9% African American, 0.3% Native American, 0.9% Asian, 1.3% from other races, and 2.9% from two or more races. Hispanic or Latino residents of any race were 3.0% of the population.

There were 58,404 households, of which 28.3% had children under the age of 18 living with them, 25.9% were married couples living together, 21.4% had a female householder with no husband present, 5.9% had a male householder with no wife present, and 46.8% were non-families. 38.8% of all households were made up of individuals, and 11.2% had someone living alone who was 65 years of age or older. The average household size was 2.26, and the average family size was 3.03.

The median age in the city was 34.4 years. 22.9% of residents were under the age of 18; 14.2% were between the ages of 18 and 24; 25.3% were from 25 to 44; 25.8% were from 45 to 64, and 11.8% were 65 years of age or older. The gender makeup of the city was 48.7% male and 51.3% female.

=== Crime ===
Dayton's crime declined between 2003 and 2008 in key categories according to FBI Uniform Crime Reports and Dayton Police Department data. In 2009, crime continued to fall in the city of Dayton. Crime in the categories of forcible rape, aggravated assault, property crime, motor vehicle theft, robbery, burglary, theft and arson all showed declines for 2009. Overall, crime in Dayton dropped 40% over the previous year. The Dayton Police Department reported a total of 39 murders in 2016, which marked a 39.3% increase in homicides from 2015.

John Dillinger, a bank robber during the early 1930s, was captured and arrested by Dayton city police while visiting his girlfriend at a high-class boarding house in downtown Dayton.

On August 4, 2019, a mass shooting took place in Dayton. Ten people were killed, including the perpetrator, and twenty-seven were injured.

== Economy ==
Dayton's economy is relatively diversified and vital to the overall economy of the state of Ohio. In 2008 and 2009, Site Selection magazine ranked Dayton the #1 medium-sized metropolitan area in the U.S. for economic development. Dayton is also among the top 100 metropolitan areas in both exports and export-related jobs, ranked 16 and 14 respectively by the Brookings Institution. The 2010 report placed the value of exports at $4.7 billion and the number of export-related jobs at 44,133. The Dayton Metropolitan Statistical Area ranks 4th in Ohio's Gross Domestic Product with a 2008 industry total of $33.78 billion. Additionally, Dayton ranks third among 11 major metropolitan areas in Ohio for exports to foreign countries. The Dayton Development Coalition is attempting to leverage the region's large water capacity, estimated to be 1.5 trillion gallons of renewable water aquifers, to attract new businesses. Moody's Investment Services revised Dayton's bond rating from A1 to the stronger rating of Aa2 as part of its global recalibration process. Standard & Poor's upgraded Dayton's rating from A+ to AA− in the summer of 2009.

Bloomberg Businessweek ranked Dayton in 2010 as one of the best places in the U.S. for college graduates looking for a job. Companies such as Reynolds and Reynolds, Stratacache, CareSource, DP&L (soon AES inc), LexisNexis, Kettering Health Network, Premier Health Partners, and Standard Register have their headquarters in Dayton. It is also the former home of the Speedwell Motor Car Company, MeadWestvaco (formerly known as the Mead Paper Company), and NCR. NCR was headquartered in Dayton for over 125 years and was a major innovator in computer technology.

=== Research and development ===
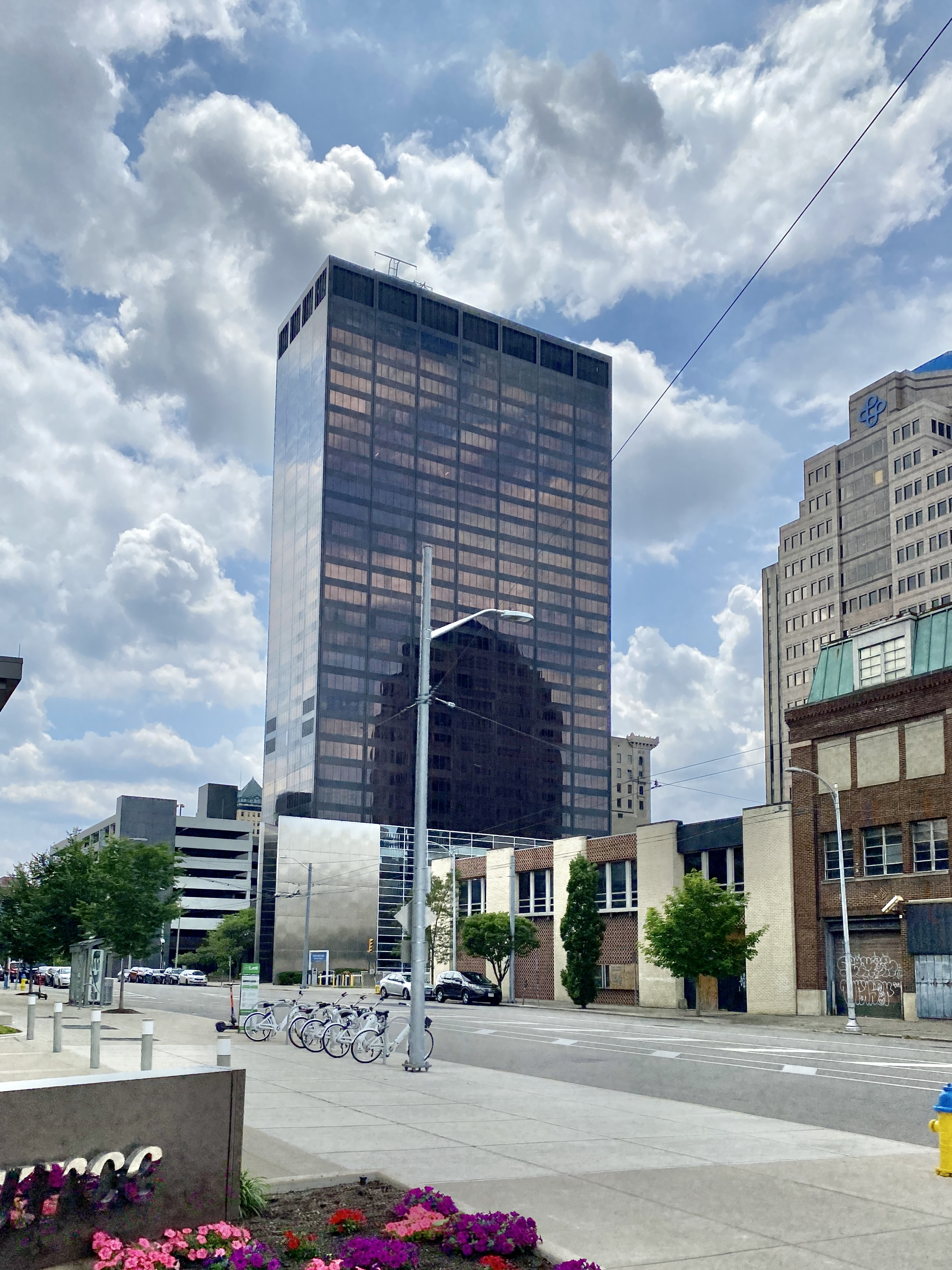
Stratacache Tower, Dayton's tallest high-rise

The Dayton region gave birth to aviation and is known for its high concentration of aerospace and aviation technology. In 2009, Governor Ted Strickland designated Dayton as Ohio's aerospace innovation hub, the state's first such technology hub. Two major United States research and development organizations have leveraged Dayton's historical leadership in aviation and maintain their headquarters in the area: The National Air and Space Intelligence Center (NASIC) and the Air Force Research Laboratory (AFRL). Both have their headquarters at Wright-Patterson Air Force Base.

Several research organizations support NASIC, AFRL, and the Dayton community. The Advanced Technical Intelligence Center is a confederation of government, academic, and industry partners. The University of Dayton Research Institute (UDRI) is led by the University of Dayton. The Cognitive Technologies Division (CTD) of Applied Research Associates, Inc., which carries out human-centered research and design, is headquartered in the Dayton suburb of Fairborn. The city of Dayton has started Tech Town, a development project to attract technology-based firms and revitalize the downtown area. Tech Town is home to the world's first RFID business incubator. The University of Dayton–led Institute for Development & Commercialization of Sensor Technologies (IDCAST) at TechTown is a center for remote sensing and sensing technology. It is one of Dayton's technology business incubators housed in The Entrepreneurs Center building.

=== Healthcare ===
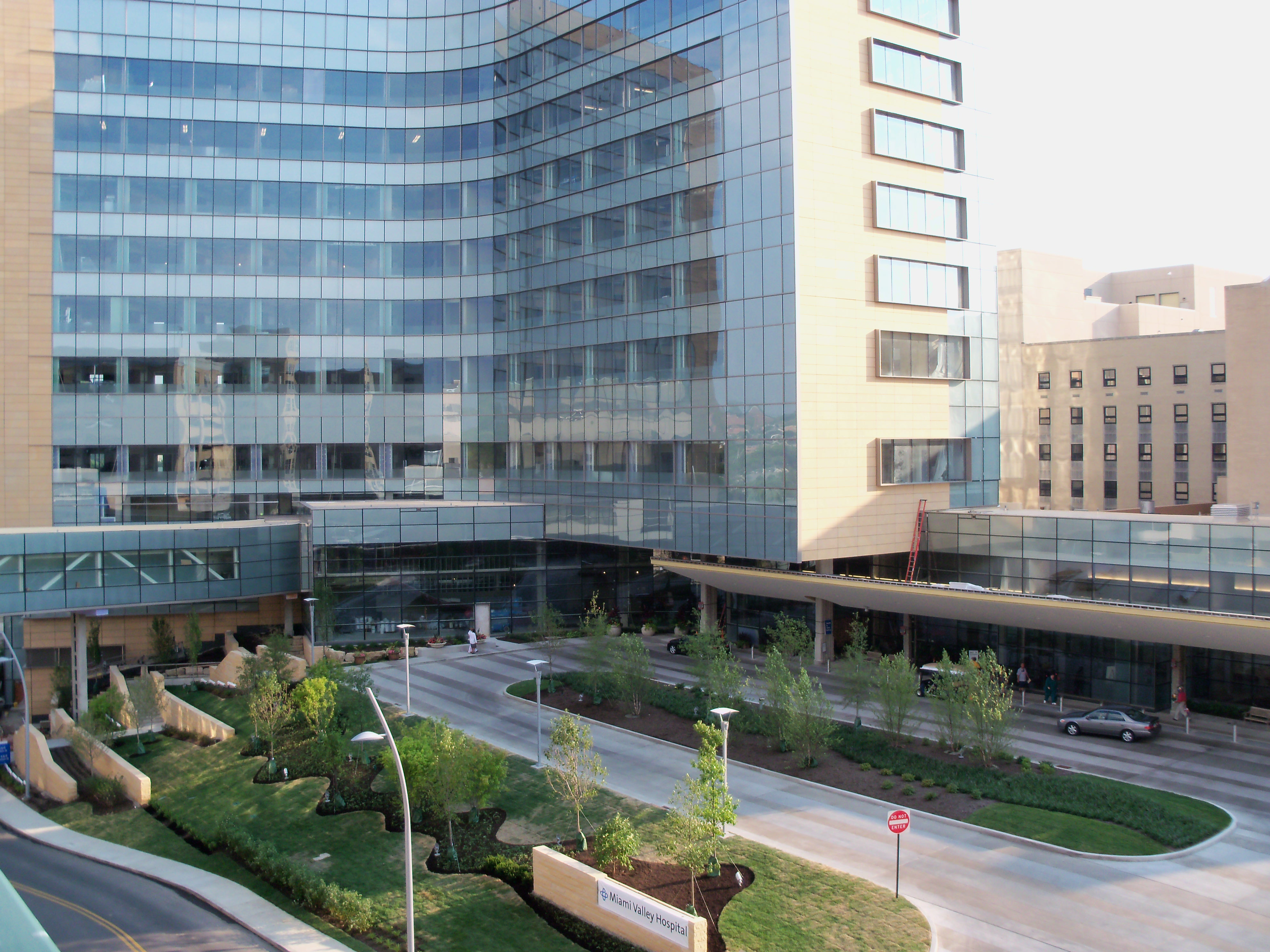
Southeast tower at Miami Valley Hospital, part of the Premier Health Partners network

The Kettering Health Network and Premier Health Partners have a major role on the Dayton area's economy. Hospitals in the Greater Dayton area have an estimated combined employment of nearly 32,000 and a yearly economic impact of $6.8 billion. In addition, several Dayton area hospitals consistently earn top national ranking and recognition including the U.S. News & World Report's list of "America's Best Hospitals" as well as many of HealthGrades top ratings. The most notable hospitals are Miami Valley Hospital and Kettering Medical Center.

The Dayton region has several key institutes and centers for health care. The Center for Tissue Regeneration and Engineering at Dayton focuses on the science and development of human tissue regeneration. The National Center for Medical Readiness (NCMR) is also in the Dayton area. The center includes Calamityville, which is a disaster training facility. Over five years, Calamityville is estimated to have a regional economic impact of $374 million. Also, the Neurological Institute at Miami Valley Hospital is an institute focused on the diagnosis, treatment, and research of neurological disorders.

=== Top employers ===
According to the city's 2024 Annual Comprehensive Financial Report, the top employers in the city proper are:

Rank	Employer	Employees (2024)	Employees (2019)	Employees (2015)
1	Premier Health Partners	11,738	12,425	14,765
2	Kettering Health Network	9,977	9,319	7,000
3	Montgomery County	4,318	4,284	3,884
4	Dayton Children's Hospital	4,235	3,341	1,517
5	University of Dayton	3,200	3,000	2,297
6	Dayton Veterans Affairs Medical Center	2,969	2,425	2,002
7	Sinclair Community College	2,614	3,163	2,613
8	Dayton Public Schools	2,386	2,062	2,085
9	CareSource	2,400	3,021	1,200
10	City of Dayton	1,826	1,963	1,910

== Arts and culture ==
=== Fine arts ===
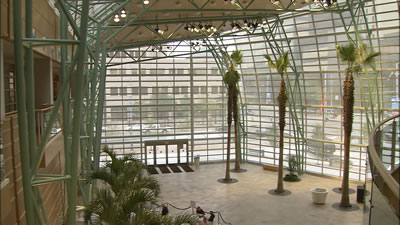
The interior of the Benjamin and Marian Schuster Performing Arts Center

The Dayton Region ranked within the top 10% in the nation in arts and culture. In a 2012 readers' poll by American Style magazine, Dayton ranked #2 in the country among mid-size cities as an arts destination, ranking higher than larger cities such as Atlanta, St. Louis, and Cincinnati. Dayton is the home of the Dayton Art Institute.

The Benjamin and Marian Schuster Performing Arts Center in downtown Dayton is a world-class performing arts center and the home venue of the Dayton Philharmonic Orchestra, Dayton Opera, and the Dayton Ballet. In addition to philharmonic and opera performances, the Schuster Center hosts concerts, lectures, and traveling Broadway shows, and is a popular spot for weddings and other events. The historic Victoria Theatre in downtown Dayton hosts concerts, traveling Broadway shows, ballet, a summertime classic film series, and more. The Loft Theatre, also downtown, is the home of the Human Race Theatre Company. The Dayton Playhouse, in West Dayton, is the site of numerous plays and theatrical productions. Between 1957 and 1995, the Kenley Players presented live theater productions in Dayton. In 2013, John Kenley was inducted into the Dayton Theatre Hall of Fame. Dayton is also home to the Winter Guard International world finals, hosting finals for winter guard, indoor percussion, and indoor winds.

Dayton is the home to several ballet companies including:

- The Dayton Ballet, one of the oldest professional dance companies in the United States. The Dayton Ballet runs the Dayton Ballet School, the oldest dance school in Dayton and one of the oldest in the country. It is the only ballet school in the Miami Valley associated with a professional dance company.
- The Dayton Contemporary Dance Company (established in 1968), which hosts the largest repertory of African-American-based contemporary dance in the world. The company travels nationally and internationally and has been recognized by critics worldwide.

Front Street, the largest artists' collective in Dayton, is housed in three industrial buildings on East Second Street.

=== Entertainment ===
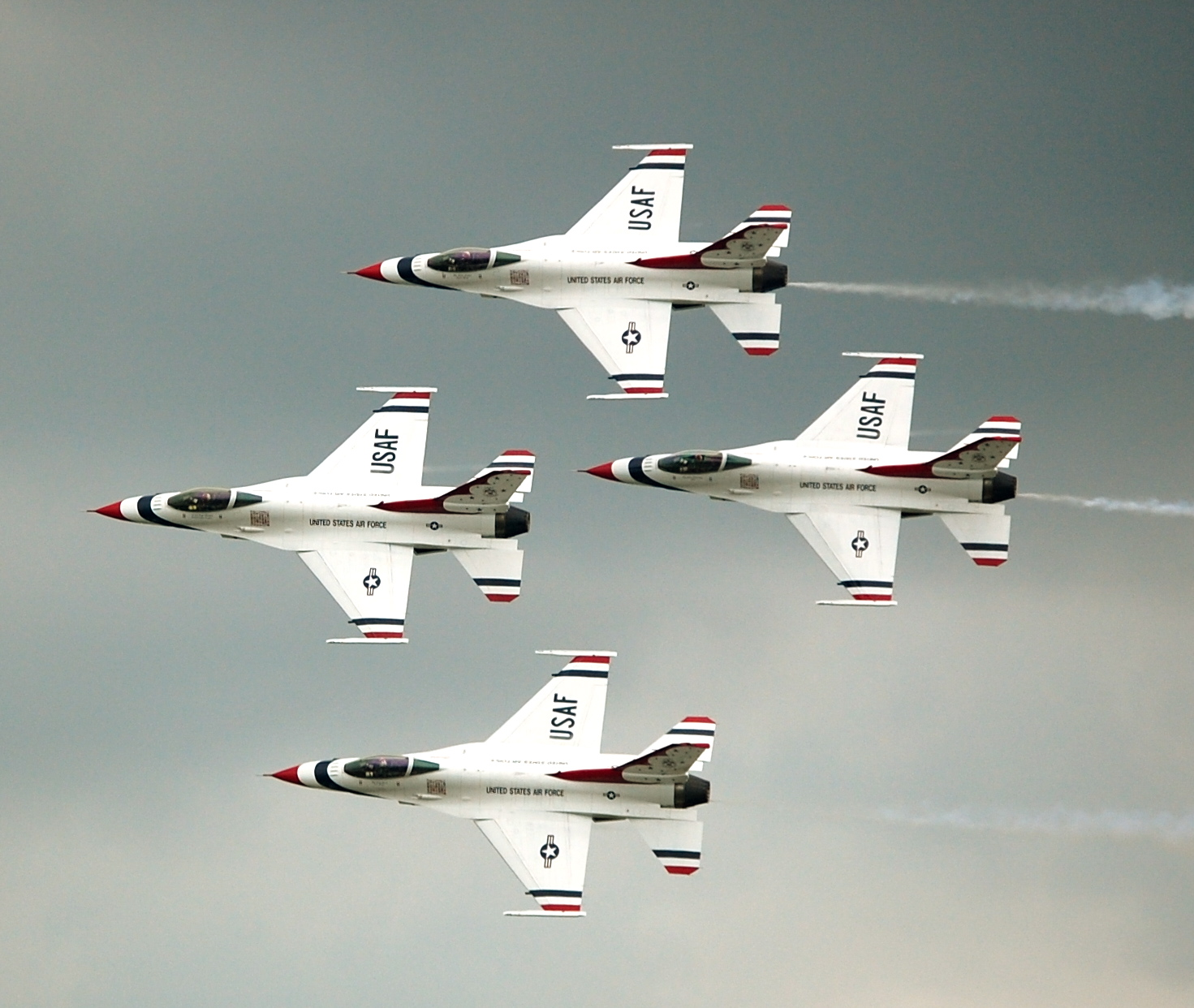
Thunderbirds at the 2009 Dayton Air Show

The Vectren Dayton Air Show is an annual air show that takes place at the Dayton International Airport. The Vectren Dayton Airshow is one of the largest air shows in the United States.

The Dayton area is served by Five Rivers MetroParks, encompassing 14,161 acres (5,731 ha) over 23 facilities for year-round recreation, education, and conservation. In cooperation with the Miami Conservancy District, the MetroParks maintains over 70 miles (113 km) of paved, multi-use scenic trails that connect Montgomery County with Greene, Miami, Warren, and Butler counties.

Dayton was home to a thriving funk music scene from the 1970s to the early 1980s, that included bands such as Ohio Players, Roger Troutman & Zapp, Lakeside, Sun, Dayton, Heatwave, and Slave. The music scene led to the city being nicknamed the "land of funk".

Dayton was also the birthplace to several influential indie and punk bands such as The Breeders, Guided by Voices, and Brainiac.

From 1996 to 1998, Dayton hosted the National Folk Festival. Since then, the annual Cityfolk Festival has continued to bring folk, ethnic, and world music and arts to Dayton. The Five Rivers MetroParks also owns and operates the PNC Second Street Market near downtown Dayton.

The Dayton area hosts several arenas and venues. South of Dayton in Kettering is the Fraze Pavilion, whose notable performances have included the Backstreet Boys, Boston, and Steve Miller Band. South of downtown, on the banks of the Great Miami River, is the University of Dayton Arena, home venue for the University of Dayton Flyers basketball teams and the location of various other events and concerts. It also hosts the Winter Guard International championships, at which hundreds of percussion and color guard ensembles from around the world compete. In addition, the Dayton Amateur Radio Association hosts the annual Dayton Hamvention, North America's largest hamfest, at the Greene County Fairgrounds in nearby Xenia. The Nutter Center, which is just east of Dayton in the suburb of Fairborn, is the home arena for athletics of Wright State University and the former Dayton Bombers hockey team. This venue is used for many concerts, community events, and various national traveling shows and performances.

The Oregon District is a historic residential and commercial district in southeast downtown Dayton. The district is populated with art galleries, specialty shops, pubs, nightclubs, and coffee houses.

The city of Dayton is also host to annual festivals, such as the Dayton Celtic Festival, the Dayton Blues Festival, Dayton Music Fest, Urban Nights, Women in Jazz, the African American and Cultural Festival, the Dayton Reggae Fest, and the Dayton Hispanic Heritage Festival.

=== Cuisine ===
The city's fine dining restaurants include The Pine Club, a nationally known steakhouse.

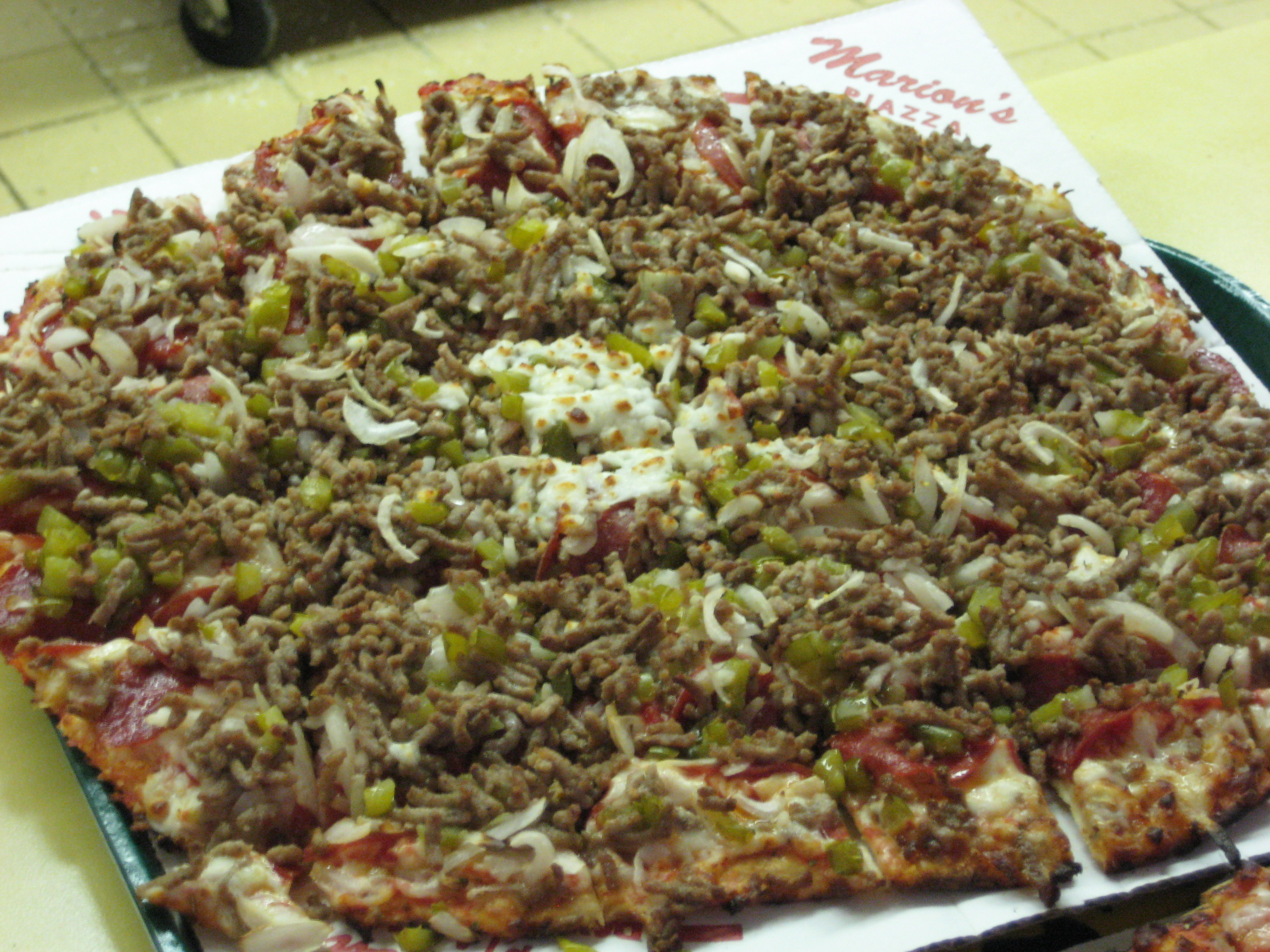
Dayton-style pizza

Dayton is home to a variety of pizza chains that have become woven into local culture, the most notable of which are Cassano's and Marion's Piazza, both of which produce Dayton-style pizza, which has a thin, crisp, salty crust dusted on the bottom with cornmeal and topped with a thin layer of thick unsweetened sauce. Cheese and other topping ingredients are heavily distributed and spread edge-to-edge with no outer rim of crust, and the finished pizza is cut into bite-size squares.

Notable Dayton-based restaurant chains include Hot Head Burritos.

In addition to restaurants, the city is also home to Esther Price Candies, a candy and chocolate company, and Mike-sells, the oldest potato chip company in the United States.

The city began developing a reputation for its number of breweries and craft beer venues by the late 2010s.

=== Religion ===
Many major religions are represented in Dayton. Christianity is represented in Dayton by dozens of denominations and their respective churches. Notable Dayton churches include the First Lutheran Church, Corpus Christi Church, Sacred Heart Church, and Ginghamsburg Church. Dayton's Muslim community is largely represented by the Islamic Society of Greater Dayton (ISGD), a Muslim community that includes a mosque on Josie Street. Dayton is also home to the United Theological Seminary, one of 13 seminaries affiliated with the United Methodist Church. Judaism is represented by Temple Israel. Hinduism is represented by the Hindu Temple of Dayton. Old North Dayton also has a number of Catholic churches built by immigrants from Lithuania, Poland, Hungary, and Germany.

=== Tourism ===
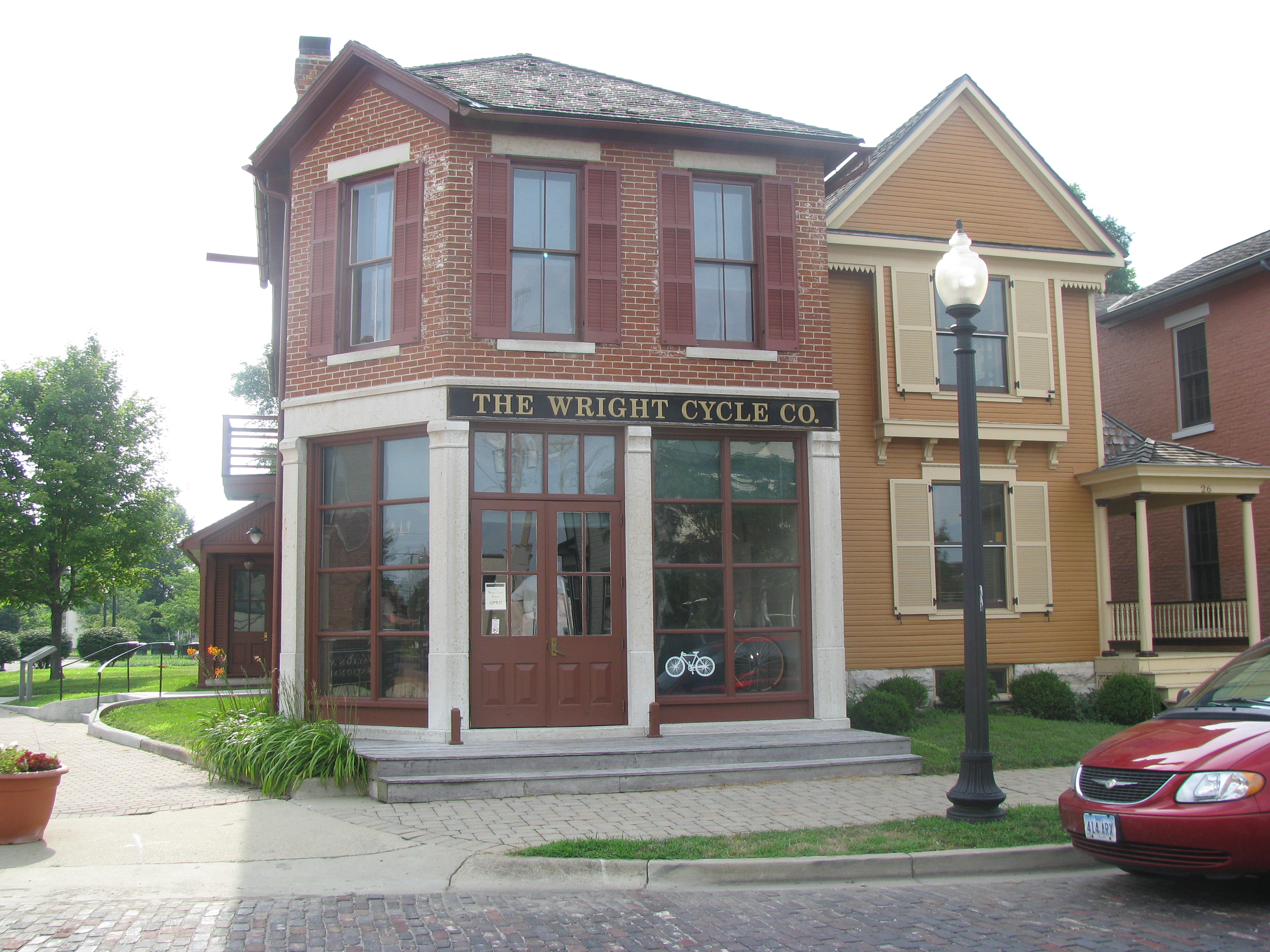
Dayton Aviation Heritage National Historical Park

Tourism also accounts for one out of every 14 private sector jobs in the county. Tourism in the Dayton region is led by the National Museum of the United States Air Force at Wright-Patterson Air Force Base, the largest and oldest military aviation museum in the world. The museum draws over 1.3 million visitors per year and is one of the most-visited tourist attractions in Ohio. The museum houses the National Aviation Hall of Fame.

Other museums also play significant roles in the tourism and economy of the Dayton area. The Dayton Art Institute, a museum of fine arts, owns collections containing more than 20,000 objects spanning 5,000 years of art and archaeological history. The Dayton Art Institute was rated one of the top 10 best art museums in the United States for children. The Boonshoft Museum of Discovery is a children's museum of science with numerous exhibits, one of which includes an indoor zoo with nearly 100 different animals.

There are also some notable historical museums in the region. The Dayton Aviation Heritage National Historical Park, operated by the National Park Service, commemorates the lives and achievements of Dayton natives Orville and Wilbur Wright and Paul Laurence Dunbar. The Wright brothers' famous Wright Flyer III aircraft is housed in a museum at Carillon Historical Park. Dayton is also home to America's Packard Museum, which contains many restored historical Packard vehicles. SunWatch Indian Village/Archaeological Park, a partially reconstructed 12th-century prehistoric American Indian village, is on the south end of Dayton; it is organized around a central plaza dominated by wood posts forming an astronomical calendar. The park includes a museum where visitors can learn about the Indian history of the Miami Valley.

== Parks and recreation ==
Dayton was named National Geographic's outdoor adventure capital of the Midwest in 2019 due in large part to the metropolitan area's revitalized Five Rivers MetroPark, extensive bicycle and jogging trail system, urban green spaces, lakes and camping areas.

Dayton Regional Bike Trail Map

In cooperation with the Miami Conservancy District, Five Rivers MetroParks hosts 340 miles of paved trails, the largest network of paved off-street trails in the United States. The regional trail system represents over 35% of the 900 miles in Ohio's off-street trail network. In 2010, the city of Troy was named "bike friendly" by the League of American Bicyclists, which gave the city the organization's bronze designation. The honorable mention made Dayton one of two cities in Ohio to receive the award, the other being Columbus, and one of 15 cities nationwide.

=== Sports ===
The Dayton area is home to several minor league and semi pro teams, as well as NCAA Division I sports programs.

Club	League	Sport	Venue	Established
Dayton Dragons	Midwest League	Baseball	Day Air Ballpark	2000
Gem City Roller Derby	Women's Flat Track Derby Association	Roller Derby	Dayton Convention Center	2006
Dayton Dutch Lions	USL League Two	Soccer	DOC Stadium	2009
Dayton Battlehawks	USAFL	Australian rules football	Various	2025
Dayton Flyers	NCAA Division I	(multiple)	Welcome Stadium (Football), University of Dayton Arena (Basketball), Thomas J. Frericks Center (Volleyball), Woerner Field (Baseball)	1903
Wright State Raiders	NCAA Division I	(multiple)	Ervin J. Nutter Center (Basketball), Alumni Field (Soccer), Nischwitz Stadium (Baseball)	1968
Dayton Area Rugby Club	Midwest Division II	Rugby Union; Rugby Sevens	Dayton Rugby Grounds	1969

The Dayton Dragons professional baseball team is a Class A minor league affiliate for the Cincinnati Reds. The Dayton Dragons are the first (and only) team in minor league baseball history to sell out an entire season before it began and was voted as one of the top 10 hottest tickets to get in all of professional sports by Sports Illustrated. The Dayton Dragons 815 consecutive sellouts surpassed the NBA's Portland Trail Blazers for the longest sellout streak across all professional sports in the U.S.

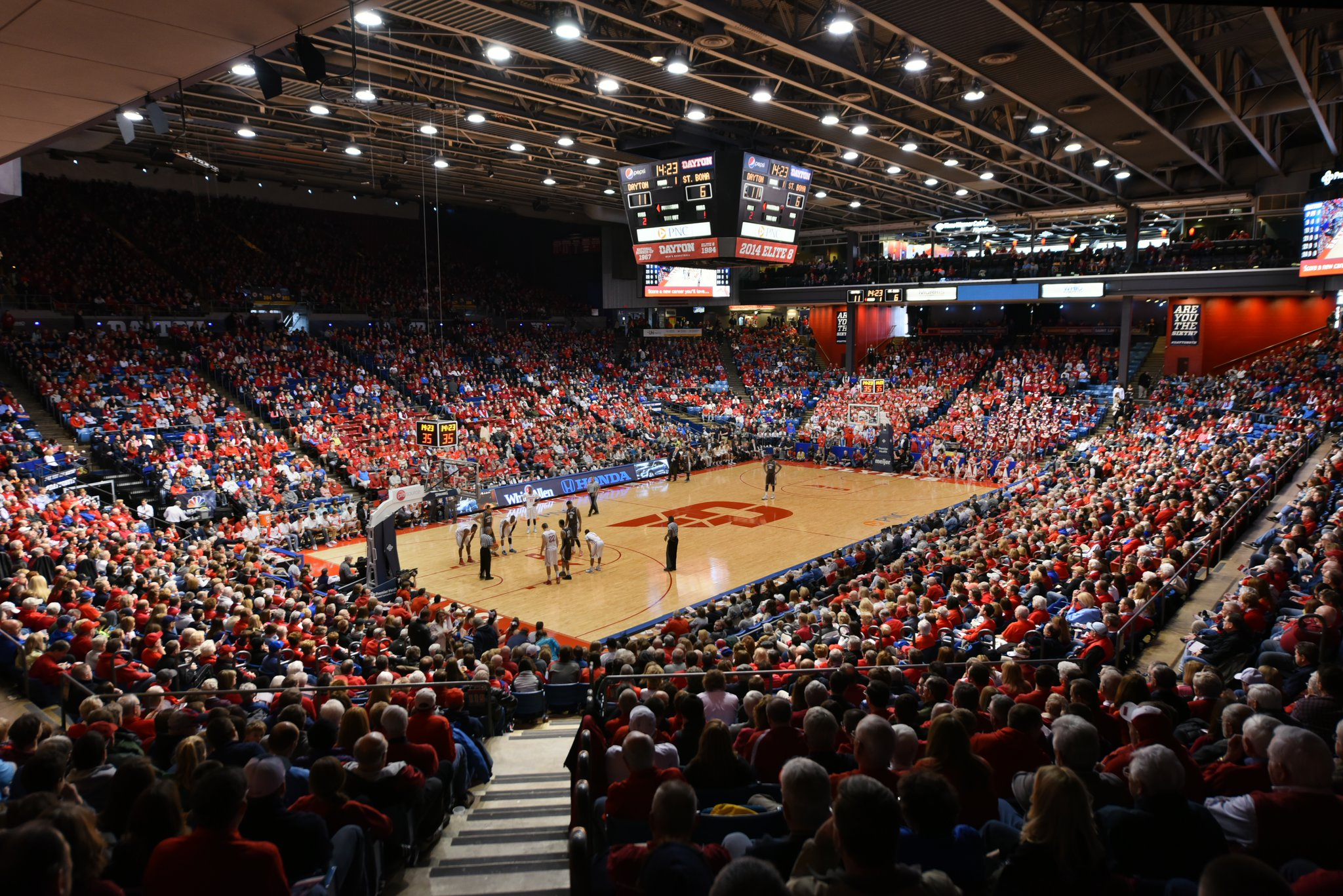
UD Arena during a Dayton Flyers men's basketball game in 2016

The University of Dayton and Wright State University both host NCAA basketball. The University of Dayton Arena has hosted more games in the NCAA men's basketball tournament over its history than any other venue. UD Arena is also the site of the First Round games of the NCAA Tournament. In 2012, eight teams competed for the final four spots in the NCAA basketball tournament. Wright State University's NCAA men's basketball is the Wright State Raiders and the University of Dayton's NCAA men's basketball team is the Dayton Flyers.

The Dayton Gems were a minor league ice hockey team in the International Hockey League from 1964 to 1977, 1979 to 1980, and most recently 2009 to 2012. The Dayton Bombers were an ECHL ice hockey team from 1991 to 2009. They most recently played the North Division of the ECHL's American Conference. In June 2009, it was announced the Bombers would turn in their membership back to the league.

Despite the folding of the Bombers, hockey remained in Dayton as the Dayton Gems of the International Hockey League were formed in the fall of 2009 at Hara Arena. The Gems folded after the 2011–12 season. Shortly after the Gems folded, it was announced a new team, the Dayton Demonz, would begin play in 2012 in the Federal Hockey League (FHL). The Demonz folded in 2015 and were immediately replaced by the Dayton Demolition, also in the FHL. However, the Demolition would cease operations after only one season when Hara Arena decided to close due to financial difficulties.

Dayton hosted the first American Professional Football Association game (precursor to the NFL). The game was played at Triangle Park between the Dayton Triangles and the Columbus Panhandles on October 3, 1920, and is considered one of the first professional football games ever played. Football teams in the Dayton area include the Dayton Flyers and the Dayton Sharks.

The Dayton region is also known for the many golf courses and clubs that it hosts. The Miami Valley Golf Club, Moraine Country Club, NCR Country Club, and the Pipestone Golf Course are some of the more notable courses. Also, several PGA Championships have been held at area golf courses. The Miami Valley Golf Club hosted the 1957 PGA Championship, the Moraine Country Club hosted the 1945 PGA Championship, and the NCR Country club hosted the 1969 PGA Championship. Additionally, NCR CC hosted the 1986 U.S. Women's Open, the 2005 U.S. Senior Open, the 2013 State Team Championships and most recently the 2022 Senior Women's Open. Other notable courses include the Yankee Trace Golf Club, the Beavercreek Golf Club, Dayton Meadowbrook Country Club, Sycamore Creek Country Club, Heatherwoode Golf Club, Community Golf Course, and Kitty Hawk Golf Course.

The city of Dayton is the home to the Dayton Area Rugby Club which hosts their home games at the Dayton Rugby Grounds. As of 2018, the club fields two men's and one women's side for Rugby Union and several Rugby Sevens sides. The club also hosts the annual Gem City 7's tournament.

== Government ==
The Dayton City Commission is composed of the mayor and four city commissioners. Each city commission member is elected at-large on a non-partisan basis for four-year, overlapping terms. All policy items are decided by the city commission, which is empowered by the City Charter to pass ordinances and resolutions, adopt regulations, and appoint the city manager. The city manager is responsible for budgeting and implementing policies and initiatives. Dayton was the first large American city to adopt the city manager (Henry Matson Waite) form of municipal government, in 1913.

== Education ==
=== Public schools ===
Dayton Public Schools operates 34 schools that serve 16,855 students, including:

- Belmont High
- Meadowdale High
- Paul Laurence Dunbar High
- Ponitz Career Technology Center
- Stivers School for the Arts
- Thurgood Marshall High

=== Private schools ===
The city of Dayton has more than 35 private schools within the city, including:

- Archbishop Alter High School
- Carroll High School
- Chaminade Julienne Catholic High School
- Dayton Christian School
- Dominion Academy of Dayton
- The Miami Valley School
- Spring Valley Academy
- Reformation Classical Academy

=== Charter schools ===
Dayton has 33 charter schools. Three of the top five charter schools named in 2011 are K–8 schools managed by National Heritage Academies. Notable charter schools include:

- Dayton Early College Academy
- Emerson Academy
- North Dayton School of Discovery
- Pathway School of Discovery
- Richard Allen Schools

=== Colleges and universities ===
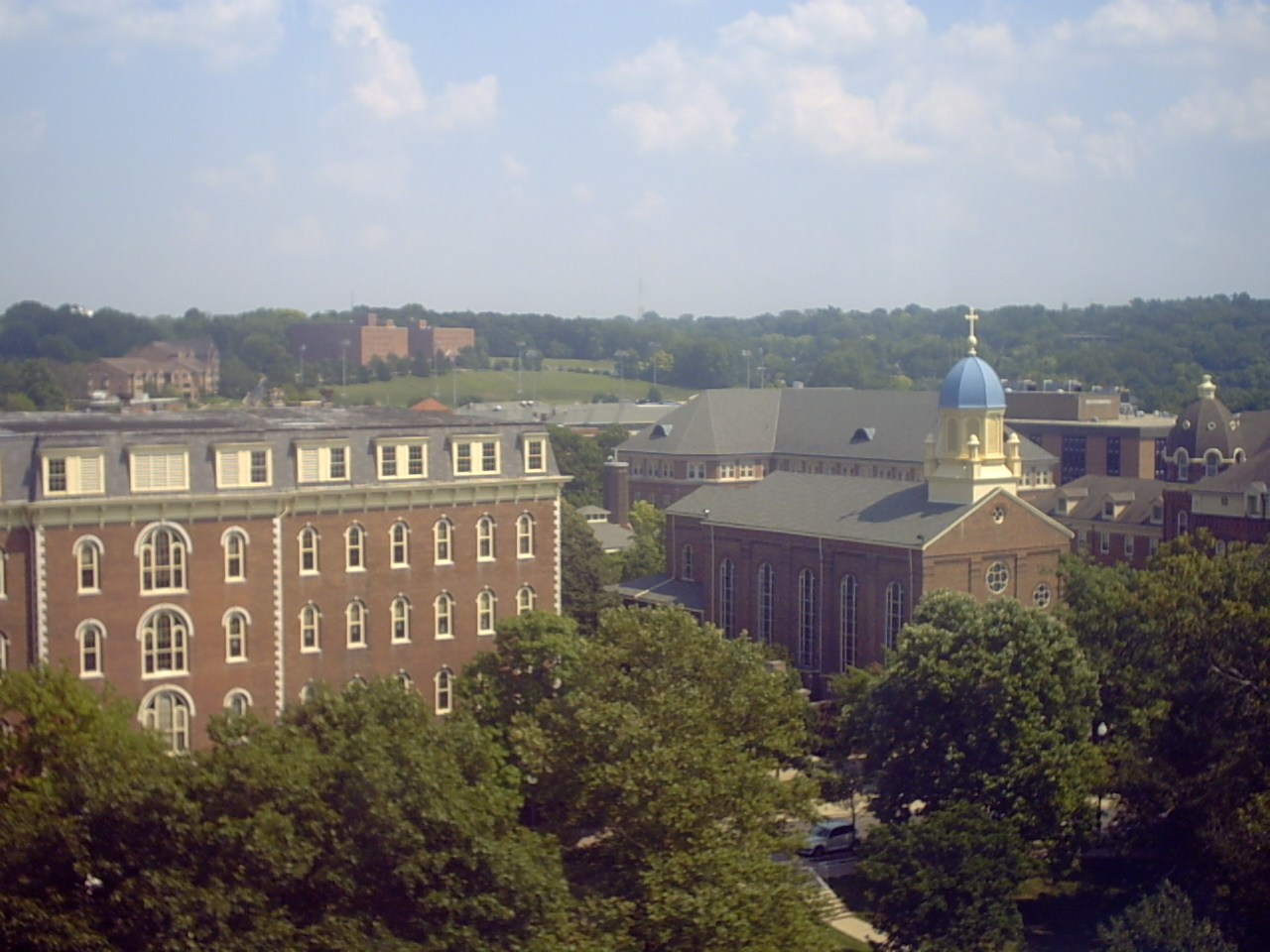
St. Mary's Hall and the Immaculate Conception Chapel at the University of Dayton

The Dayton area was ranked tenth for higher education among metropolitan areas in the United States by Forbes in 2009. The city is home to two major universities. The University of Dayton is a private, Catholic institution founded in 1850 by the Marianist order. It has the only American Bar Association (ABA)-approved law school in the Dayton area. The University of Dayton is Ohio's largest private university and is also home to the University of Dayton Research Institute, which ranks third in the nation for sponsored materials research, and the Center for Tissue Regeneration and Engineering at Dayton, which focuses on human tissue regeneration.

The public Wright State University became a state university in 1967. Wright State University established the National Center for Medical Readiness, a national training program for disaster preparedness and relief. Wright State's Boonshoft School of Medicine is the Dayton area's only medical school and is a leader in biomedical research.

Dayton is also home to Sinclair Community College, the largest community college at a single location in Ohio and one of the nation's largest community colleges. Sinclair is acclaimed as one of the country's best community colleges. Sinclair was founded as the YMCA college in 1887.

Other schools just outside Dayton that shape the educational landscape are Antioch College and Antioch University, both in Yellow Springs, Central State University in Wilberforce, Kettering College of Medical Arts and School of Advertising Art in Kettering, DeVry University in Beavercreek, Cedarville University, Clark State Community College and Wittenberg University in Springfield. The Air Force Institute of Technology, which was founded in 1919 and serves as a graduate school for the United States Air Force, is at the nearby Wright-Patterson Air Force Base.

=== Institutions ===
- Boonshoft School of Medicine
- Dayton Art Institute
- Ohio Institute of Photography and Technology
- School of Advertising Art
- Wright State University

== Media ==
Dayton Daily News building at 1611 S. Main St.

=== Print ===
Dayton is served in print by The Dayton Daily News, the city's sole remaining daily newspaper. The Dayton Daily News is owned by Cox Enterprises. The Dayton region's main business newspaper is the Dayton Business Journal. The Dayton City Paper, a community paper focused on music, art, and independent thought ceased operation in 2018. The Dayton Weekly News has been published since 1993, providing news and information to Dayton's African-American community.

There are numerous magazines produced in and for the Dayton region. The Dayton Magazine provides insight into arts, food, and events. Focus on Business is published by the Chamber of Commerce to provide awareness of companies and initiatives affecting the regional economy

=== Television ===
Nielsen Media Research ranked the 11-county Dayton television market as the No. 62 market in the United States. The market is served by stations affiliated with major American networks including: WDTN, channel 2 – NBC, operated by Nexstar Media Group; WHIO-TV, channel 7 – CBS, operated by Cox Media Group; WPTD, channel 16 – PBS, operated by ThinkTV, which also operates WPTO, assigned to Oxford; WKEF, channel 22 – ABC/Fox, operated by Sinclair Broadcasting; WBDT, channel 26 – The CW, operated by Vaughan Media (a shell corporation of Nexstar), assigned to Springfield; WKOI-TV, channel 43 – Ion Television, assigned to Richmond, Indiana; and WRGT-TV, channel 45 – My Network TV, operated under a local marketing agreement by Sinclair Broadcasting. The nationally syndicated morning talk show The Daily Buzz originated from WBDT, the former ACME Communications property in Miamisburg, before moving to its current home in Florida.

=== Radio ===
Dayton is also served by 42 AM and FM radio stations directly, and numerous other stations are heard from elsewhere in southwest Ohio, which serve outlying suburbs and adjoining counties.

== Transportation ==
=== Public transit ===
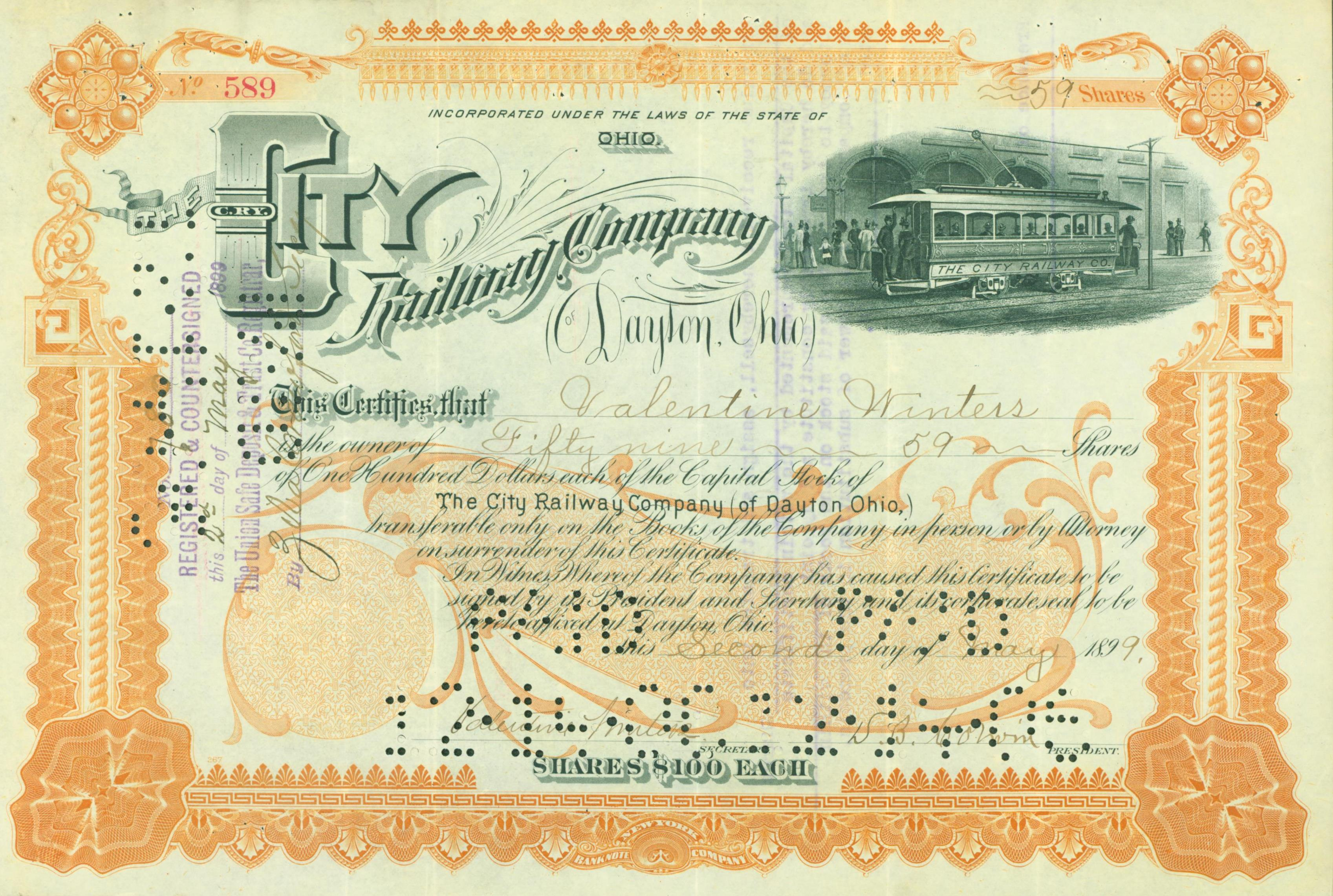
Share of the City Railway Company (of Dayton, Ohio), issued May 2, 1899

The Greater Dayton Regional Transit Authority (RTA) operates public bus routes in the Dayton metro area. In addition to routes covered by traditional diesel-powered buses, RTA has several electric trolley bus routes. The Dayton trolleybus system is the second longest-running of the four remaining trolleybus systems in the U.S., having entered service in 1933. It is the present manifestation of an electric transit service that has operated continuously in Dayton since 1888.

Dayton operates a Greyhound Station which provides inter-city bus transportation to and from Dayton. The hub is in the Greater Dayton Regional Transit Authority North-West hub in Trotwood.

=== Airports ===
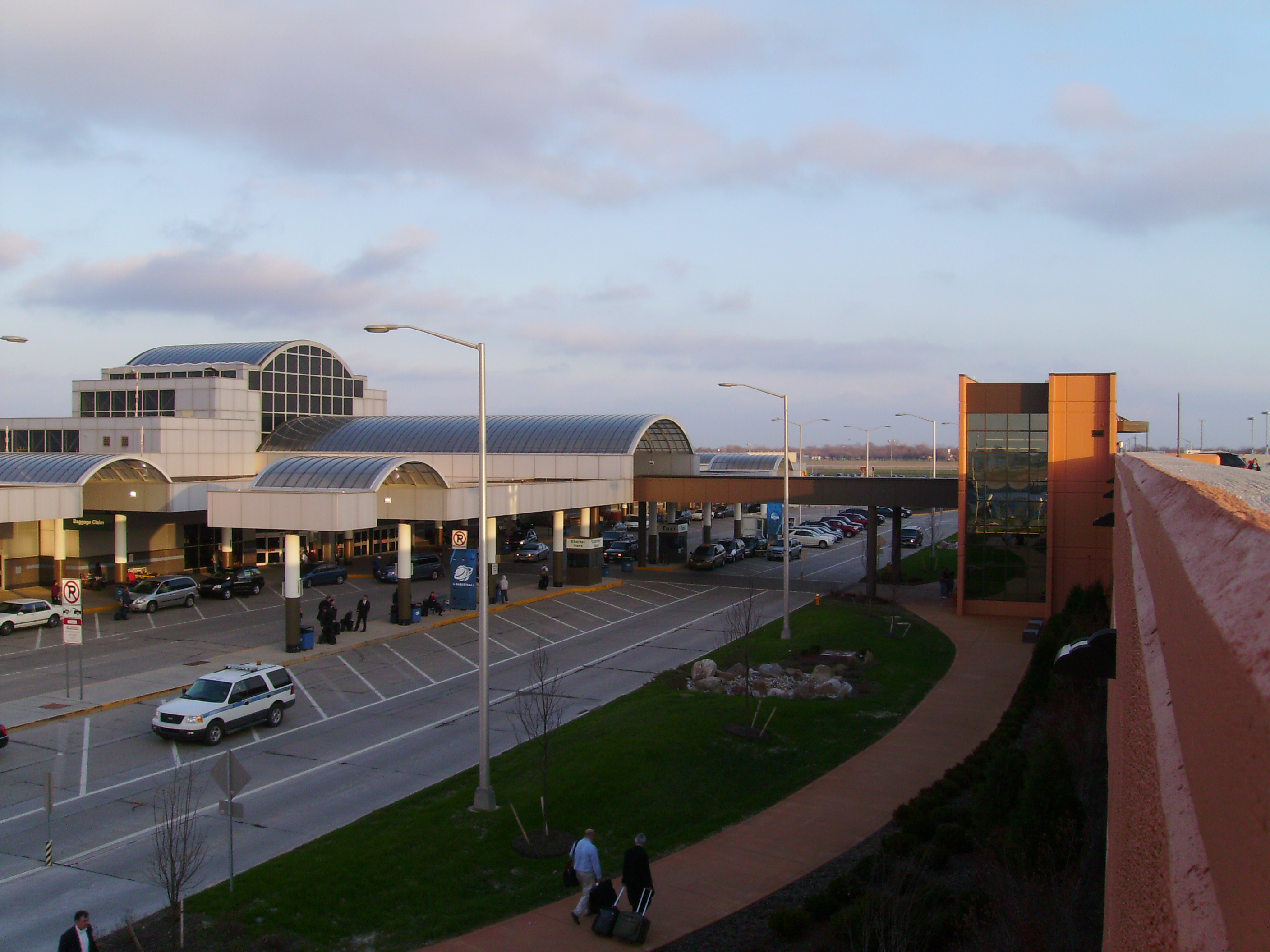
Terminal building at Dayton International Airport

Dayton International Airport lies in a northern exclave of the city and offers service to 21 markets through 10 airlines. In 2008, it served 2.9 million passengers. The Dayton International Airport is also a significant regional air freight hub hosting FedEx Express, UPS Airlines, United States Postal Service, and major commercial freight carriers.

The Dayton area also has several regional airports. The Dayton–Wright Brothers Airport is a general aviation airport owned by the City of Dayton 10 miles (16 km) south of the central business district of Dayton on Springboro Pike in Miami Township. It serves as the reliever airport for Dayton International Airport. The airport primarily serves corporate and personal aircraft users. The Dahio Trotwood Airport, also known as Dayton-New Lebanon Airport, is a privately owned, public-use airport 7 miles (11 km) west of the central business district of Dayton. The Moraine Airpark is a privately owned, public-use airport 4 miles (6.4 km) southwest of the city of Dayton.

=== Major highways ===
The Dayton region is primarily served by three interstates:

- Interstate 75 runs north to south through the city of Dayton and many of Dayton's north and south suburbs, including Kettering and Centerville south of Dayton and Vandalia, Tipp City, and Troy north of Dayton.
- Interstate 70 is a major east–west interstate that runs through many of Dayton's east and west suburbs, including Huber Heights, Butler Township, Englewood, and Brookville, and intersects with I-75 in Vandalia, Ohio, just north of the city. This intersection of I-70 and I-75 is also known as "Freedom Veterans Crossroads", which was officially named by the U.S. Department of Transportation in 2004. I-70 is the major route to the airport.
- Interstate 675 is a partial interstate ring on the southeastern and eastern suburbs of Dayton. It runs northeast to south and connects to I-70 to the northeast and I-75 to the south.

Other major routes for the region include:

- US 35 is a major limited access east–west highway that bisects the city. It is most widely used between Drexel and Xenia.
- Route 40 is a major east–west highway that runs parallel to (and 2 miles north of) I-70
- State Route 4 is a freeway that is most heavily traveled between I-75 and I-70.
- State Route 444 is north–south state highway. Its southern terminus is at its interchange with Route 4, and its northern terminus is at Interstate 675. This limited-access road serves Dayton and Fairborn and is a significant route to access points serving Wright-Patterson Air Force Base.

From 2010 through 2017, the Ohio Department of Transportation (ODOT) performed a $533 million construction project to modify, reconstruct and widen I-75 through downtown Dayton, from Edwin C Moses Blvd. to Stanley Avenue.

=== Rail ===
Dayton hosts several inter-modal freight railroad terminals. Two Class I railroads, CSX and Norfolk Southern Railway, operate switching yards in the city.

Formerly the Baltimore and Ohio Railroad, New York Central Railroad and the Pennsylvania Railroad, and afterward, Amtrak made long-distance passenger train stops at Dayton Union Station on S. Sixth Street. The last train leaving there was the National Limited in October 1979.

== Sister cities ==
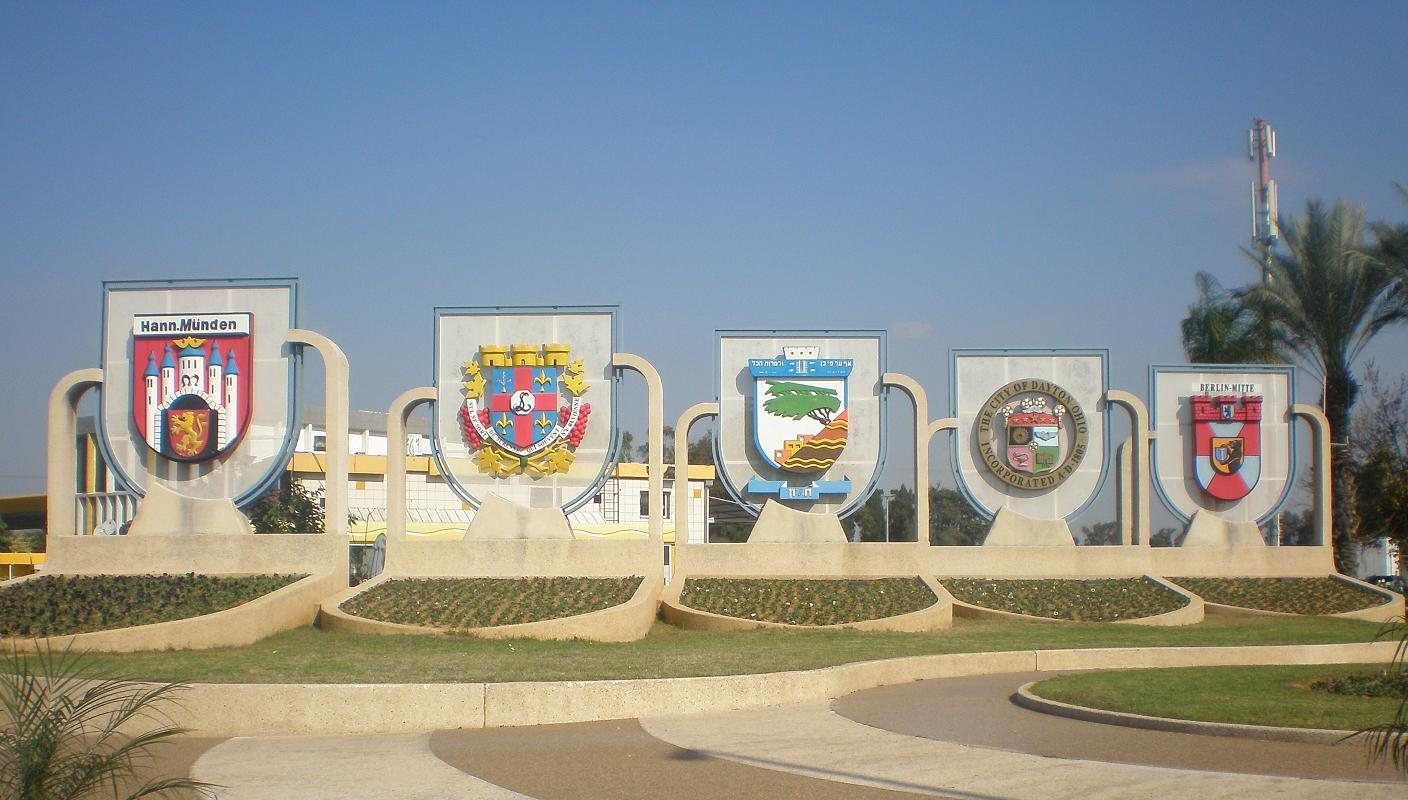
The Dayton City Seal (fourth from left) in its sister city of Holon, Israel

Dayton's sister cities are:

- Sarajevo, Bosnia and Herzegovina
- Augsburg, Germany
- Holon, Israel
- Monrovia, Liberia
- Ōiso, Japan
- Rushmoor, England
- Salfit, Palestine

== See also ==
- List of mayors of Dayton, Ohio
- List of people from Dayton, Ohio
- List of U.S. cities with large Black populations
- National Aviation Hall of Fame
- Politics of Dayton, Ohio
- USS Dayton, 2 ships
- Delco Electronics Corporation
- National Cash Register Corporation
