= Early College Academy =

Early College Academy may refer to:

- Dayton Early College Academy, in Dayton, Ohio
- Gilroy Early College Academy, in Gilroy, California
