= National Center for Medical Readiness =

US health education organization

- National Center for Medical Readiness symbol
- Formation: 2005, originally known as The H.E.L.P Center
- Type: Emergency management
- Purpose: Emergency response
- Headquarters: Dayton, Ohio, U.S.
- Region served: United States
- Director: Rufus Smith; founding director Mark E. Gebhart, MD
- Website: National Center for Medical Readiness

The National Center for Medical Readiness (NCMR), conceptualized and founded by Mark E. Gebhart, MD provides medically oriented education, training, product testing, and research opportunities for medical, public health, public safety, and civilian and military personnel at its 52-acre tactical training site, Calamityville, located in Fairborn, Ohio. NCMR is a division of Wright State University.

Key original concepts included development and concept implementation of the State of Ohio surge capacity response, known as "MEMS." MEMS was adapted from a US Army program by Dr. Gebhart with extensive input from Tish Miller, Peter Savard and Jack Smith.

== Calamityville ==
The National Center for Medical Readiness (NCMR) has created a self-sustaining, all-hazard, actual conditions training environment for first responders (Law Enforcement, Fire, and EMS), first receivers (physicians, nurses, mid-level providers, hospital staff), Department of Defense (DoD) Special Operations and tactical combat medical specialists, and civilian populations. NCMR maintains existing classroom and office facilities set on approximately 52 acres in Fairborn, Ohio, and uses unique props and realistic simulated settings to duplicate the full range of hazardous environments seen in both man-made and natural disasters. These include flooding, debris fields, hazardous materials, confined spaces, and transportation-oriented wreckage. These environments provide a training and research platform for a wide market of potential users. They also serve as an actual usage test bed for private industry development and commercialization of disaster preparedness-related equipment and materials. The Calamityville site was donated by Cemex a cement-producing company.

The facility bridges the gap between medical readiness and disaster response through the creation and implementation of training programs that offer solutions to dynamic emergency rescue challenges. In 2011, the strategic planning became focused upon research and development.

- Providing a high level of pre-hospital trauma life support in the most austere of environments;
- Gaining access to trapped and missing persons;
- Evacuating victims in the safest and most effective way possible, to receive the utmost care and recovery.
