= Ohio Institute of Photography and Technology =

For-profit university in Dayton, Ohio

Coordinates: 39.706477°N 84.205244°W

Ohio Institute of Photography & Technology
- Established: 1971
- Location: 2800 E River Rd; Dayton, OH 45439, Dayton, Ohio, United States

The Ohio Institute of Photography (OIP) is a for-profit institution in Dayton, Ohio.

It was founded in 1971. In 1977, construction began on the main building. Classes began in the new building, designed specifically for photographic education, the following September. The building was expanded again in 1984.

The school was renamed the Ohio Institute of Photography and Technology (OIP&T) in 1991 with the addition of an allied health program. Several other medical, criminal justice, and graphic design related programs were added to the curriculum over the next several years. With the addition of these programs, the school added classroom space in the nearby Point West Business Park. A branch campus called Florida Education Center-Lauderhill was opened in January 2005.

OIP&T was acquired by Kaplan Higher Education and renamed Kaplan College, Dayton campus in 2010.

The school is currently owned by Education Corporation of America and changed its name to Brightwood College in October 2015.

== Campus ==
The campus is located on the southern side of Dayton very close to Interstate seventy-five (I-75).

== Accreditation ==
The school is accredited by the Accrediting Council for Independent Colleges and Schools (ACICS), which offers accreditation to whole institutions for diverse educational programs. The medical assisting program is accredited by the Commission on Accreditation of Allied Health Education Programs.

== See also ==
- Kaplan College
