= Hot Head Burritos =

Mexican restaurant chain

- Company type: Private
- Founded: Dayton, Ohio, United States (March 2007)
- Founder: Cynthia Wiley; Raymond Wiley
- Headquarters: Dayton, Ohio, United States
- Number of locations: 87
- Area served: United States
- Website: HotHeadBurritos.com

Hot Head Burritos is a restaurant chain based in Dayton, Ohio. The restaurant specializes in Mexican-style burritos and other Mexican-style foods. Hot Head Burritos was ranked by AOL.com in 2009 as one of America's next big chains. In 2011, Hot Head Burritos was named 41st on FastCasual's list of 2011's Top 100 Movers and Shakers.

As of January 2026, 87 locations were in operation in the United States.

== History ==
The company plans to continue to add more restaurants in the Dayton region. They have also announced plans to expand into Kentucky and Cincinnati. In 2011, Hot Head announced plans to move into the Columbus, Ohio market. The company in planning for up to 50 restaurants in the Columbus area. On September 21, 2011, Hot Head Burritos opened their first store in the Columbus area located in the Columbus suburb of Hilliard. In November 2011, the restaurant signed a deal for more than 30 additional Ohio locations. As of January 2026, the restaurant had 87 locations: 1 in Connecticut, 5 in Florida, 9 in Indiana, 5 in Kentucky, 1 in Massachusetts, 62 in Ohio, 2 in Pennsylvania, 1 in Tennessee, and 1 in Texas. Hot Head Burritos operates as a franchise with their headquarters located in Kettering, Ohio, a suburb of Dayton.

On May 27th, 2026, Ray Wiley passed away at the age of 60 years old.
