= USS Dayton =

USS Dayton has been the name of two ships in the United States Navy, named after the city of Dayton, Ohio.

- USS Dayton (CL-78), was renamed and reclassified Monterey (CVL-26) on 31 March 1942, prior to launching.
- USS Dayton (CL-105), a Cleveland-class light cruiser, served from 1944 until 1949.
