= Center for Tissue Regeneration and Engineering at Dayton =

The Center for Tissue Regeneration and Engineering at Dayton (TREND) is a research center which focuses on tissue regeneration and is partnered with the National Institutes of Health, the National Science Foundation, Air Force Research Laboratory, and Ethicon Endo-Surgery. The center is located in Dayton, Ohio. The center has around 20 employees and funding for research comes 70 percent federal, 20 percent industry, 10 percent foundations or nonprofit organizations.
