= University of Dayton Research Institute =

US research institute

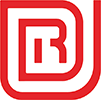
- Type: Nonprofit
- Industry: Scientific, engineering and technical research services
- Founded: Dayton, Ohio (1956)
- Headquarters: Dayton, Ohio
- Key people: Sukh Sidhu, Ph.D., Vice President for UDRI
- Products: Technical & Scientific Research Services
- Revenue: US$269.9 million (2025)
- Number of employees: 984
- Website: http://www.udri.udayton.edu/

The University of Dayton Research Institute is the professional research arm of the University of Dayton in Dayton, Ohio. UD is ranked first among all colleges in the nation for sponsored materials research, according to statistics released by the National Science Foundation. In Ohio, UD is ranked first among nonprofit institutions for research sponsored by the Department of Defense.

== Facts and information ==
The University of Dayton Research Institute (UDRI) employs 830 full-time research, technical and administrative staff. In fiscal year 2023, UDRI performed 95% of sponsored research at the University, largely contributing to UD's total research volume of $238.6 million. UDRI is nationally recognized for its research in materials, structures, sensors and autonomous systems, energy and sustainment technologies. Established as the research arm of the University of Dayton in 1956, UDRI broke the $3 billion mark in cumulative sponsored research in 2022.

Effective July 1, 2027, UDRI will transition to a non-profit, wholly-owned subsidiary of UD to improve business operations and reduce administrative complexity surrounding federal compliance requirements.
