= Dominion Academy of Dayton =

Private school in the US

- 925 N Main St. Dayton, Ohio 45405

Information
- Type: Private; Christian; Classical
- Established: 1998
- School district: Montgomery County, located in the city of Dayton
- President: Rev. Wayne McNamara
- Head of school: Dss. Michelle Caldwell
- Faculty: 20 (8 bachelors, 12 masters)
- Grades: 1-12
- Colors: black, red, white
- Athletics: Men's and Women's fall basketball fall inter scholastic soccer spring intramural soccer martial arts Cheer
- Athletics conference: OVCC - Ohio Valley Christian Conference https://www.ovccsports.com/
- Mascot: Sabers
- Affiliation: Christ the King Anglican Church
- Information: (937) 224-8555
- Website: http://www.dominionacademy.org

Dominion Academy of Dayton is a college preparatory school for grades K-12 providing a classical education based on the Bible, reason, and Tradition. It was founded in 1998 by Fr. Wayne and Sandy McNamara as a ministry of Christ the King Anglican Church. It offers a classical philosophy of education combined with small class sizes, a collegiate-model schedule and opportunities for academic mentoring and intervention. As of 2016, Dominion Academy is a non-public charter school receiving EdChoice vouchers

The school is characterized by a robust liberal arts core. For example, to graduate, students must take Rhetoric and must act in a Shakespeare comedy. AP and Honors classes are offered. Classes such as Engineering and Robotics are available for STEM oriented students. For high schoolers, the school organizes a Senior Ball each spring; students take ballroom dancing classes in order to prepare. The high school also has a chapter of the National Honor Society as well as Student Government. The school partners with Education First (EF) Tours to offer bi-annual overseas tours.

In 2014, the school introduced the Cathedral School for K through 8th graders. The program is completely flexible – allowing families to select various scheduling options for their student, whether the minimum of one class or a full-time, five-day schedule. The components of the school are named after architectural elements in a cathedral: portals, vaults, buttresses, and the spire.

In 2014, 4 out of 7 DA graduates received full rides to college. Therefore, in the last 3 years, 20 out of 35 graduates have received full rides.
