= Esther Price Candies =

Chain of candy stores in the U.S.

Esther Price Candies is a chain of candy stores in the United States. The Esther Price candy and chocolate company is based in Dayton, Ohio.

Esther Price Candies sells its products in 87 store locations in five states, including Ohio, Indiana, Kentucky, Tennessee, and Illinois. Esther Price Candies was founded in 1926, and produces about one million boxes of candy per year. The company employs about 100 people. Its chocolates are made at the Wayne Avenue facility in Dayton.

In 2009 and 2013, Ohio Magazine rated Esther Price the best chocolates in Ohio.
