= Webster Station, Dayton, Ohio =

Coordinates: 39°45′41″N 84°11′02″W

Webster Station in Dayton, Ohio is one of the nine historic districts in the city. Webster Station was empty land until it was bought in 1843. Its approximate boundaries are Keowee Street to the east, Fourth Street to the south, St. Clair Street to the west, and the Great Miami and Mad Rivers to the north. Webster Station is situated north of the Oregon District and just east of Downtown Dayton. It is a popular location for urban style lofts, such as Delco Lofts and the Cannery, and has seen breweries and bars open in recent years. It is also the location of Day Air Ballpark, home of the Dayton Dragons minor league baseball team. Webster Station is one of the fastest growing districts in the city. As of Feb 2024 there are 3 active large scale construction projects including the remodeling of the former Mendelsons liquidation building. One of the cities more overlooked gems is also situated in Webster Station, the Second Street Market. The 2SM is a year round famers market that bustles with activity on weekends, particularly during brunch hours with a handful of high-quality food options available.
