= Dayton Early College Academy =

Coordinates: 39°44′26″N 84°10′46″W

Location
- 1529 Brown St. Dayton, Ohio 45469; United States

Information
- Type: Charter
- Established: 2003
- School district: Formerly in the Dayton City School District
- Principal: Katy Jo Bull
- CEO: Dave Taylor
- Staff: teachers
- Grades: 9-12
- Colors: Red and Black
- Mascot: Bull
- Website: www.daytonearlycollege.org

Dayton Early College Academy, is a school in Dayton, Ohio. The school is typically referred to by the acronym "DECA". It is a charter school, independent of the Dayton Public Schools. DECA currently serves approximately 1,300 students in grades K-12. The school met eleven of the twelve state indicators for the 2005–2006 school year, earning it a rating of "Excellent" by the Ohio Department of Education. DECA has three main campuses: DECA Prep (K-4), DECA Middle (5-8), and DECA High (9-12).
