= Meadowbrook at Clayton =

- Location within Ohio
- 39.838°N 84.297°W

Club information
- Location: Clayton, Ohio
- Established: 1924
- Type: Public
- Owner: City of Clayton
- Tota holes: 18
- Greens: Bent grass
- Fairways: Bent grass
- Website: meadowbrookatclayton.com
- Designed by: Alex Campbell
- Par: 72
- Length: 6,663
- Course rating: 71.9
- Slope rating: 131

Meadowbrook at Clayton is a public golf course and event facility in Clayton, Ohio. The course is the home of Northmont Thunderbolts golf program. In 1924 the property was established as the Meadowbrook Country Club featuring a 171-acre (69 ha), 18-hole course designed by Alex "Nipper" Campbell. In 1963 the club hosted Arnold Palmer. The facility was donated to the City of Clayton in 2014 and opened as a public course the following year.

== Scorecard ==
Meadowbrook at Clayton
Tee	Rating/Slope	1	2	3	4	5	6	7	8	9	Out	10	11	12	13	14	15	16	17	18	In	Total
Par		4	5	3	4	4	4	5	3	4	36	4	3	5	4	3	4	4	5	4	36	72
SI	Men's	17	3	11	1	9	7	5	15	13		10	14	4	2	18	16	8	6	12
Blue	71.9/131	330	570	158	420	400	382	578	190	342	3370	390	212	515	402	194	360	381	475	364	3293	6663
White	70.4/128	305	526	158	411	384	370	570	182	330	3236	380	204	470	391	185	346	373	469	348	3166	6402
Grey	66.7/121	300	505	124	344	340	353	478	134	265	2843	339	163	418	326	172	313	300	428	284	2743	5586
Par		4	5	3	4	4	4	5	3	4	36	4	3	5	4	3	4	4	5	4	36	72
SI	Women's	11	5	15	9	7	3	1	17	13		14	18	4	8	16	12	10	2	6
Red	71.8/125	300	422	124	344	340	353	478	134	265	2760	250	163	418	326	172	313	300	390	284	2616	5376
