= List of botanical gardens and arboretums in Ohio =

This list of botanical gardens and arboretums in Ohio is intended to include all significant botanical gardens and arboretums in the U.S. state of Ohio.

Name	Image	Affiliation	City	Coordinates
Chadwick Arboretum		Ohio State University	Columbus	40°00′34″N 83°01′47″W
Cincinnati Zoo and Botanical Garden			Cincinnati	39°8′42″N 84°30′28.8″W
Cleveland Botanical Garden			Cleveland	41°30′39.05″N 81°36′34.04″W
Cox Arboretum and Gardens MetroPark			Dayton	39°39′18.58″N 84°13′26.76″W
Dawes Arboretum			Newark	39°58′44″N 82°25′01″W
Fellows Riverside Gardens		Mill Creek Metro Parks	Youngstown	41°05′57″N 80°40′30″W
Franklin Park Conservatory			Columbus	39°57′57″N 82°57′2″W
Gardenview Horticultural Park			Strongsville	41°18′46″N 81°49′55″W
Holden Arboretum			Kirtland	41°36′45.21″N 81°18′4.84″W
Inniswood Metro Gardens			Westerville	40°07′25″N 82°55′17″W
Kingwood Center			Mansfield	40°45′36″N 82°32′52″W
Kraus Preserve		Ohio Wesleyan University	Delaware	40°17′48.12″N 83°4′0.12″W
Krohn Conservatory			Cincinnati	39°6′54.86″N 84°29′25.44″W
Mount Airy Arboretum			Cincinnati	39°10′54″N 84°34′17″W
Ramser Arboretum			Danville	40°32′10″N 82°17′59″W
Stanley M. Rowe Arboretum			Indian Hill	39°11′57″N 84°20′23″W
Schedel Arboretum and Gardens			Elmore	41°28′6″N 83°18′18″W
Schoepfle Garden			Birmingham	41°19′42″N 82°21′00″W
Secrest Arboretum			Wooster	40°46′45.62″N 81°55′30.02″W
Spring Grove Cemetery			Cincinnati	39°09′52″N 84°31′22″W
Stan Hywet Hall and Gardens			Akron	41°7′7″N 81°33′5″W
R. A. Stranahan Arboretum		University of Toledo	Toledo	41°41′35″N 83°40′17″W
Toledo Botanical Garden			Toledo	41°40′05″N 83°40′20″W
Woodland Cemetery and Arboretum			Dayton	39°44′34″N 84°10′45″W

== See also ==
- List of botanical gardens and arboretums in the United States
