= Frances L. Swift =

American church and temperance worker (1837–1916)

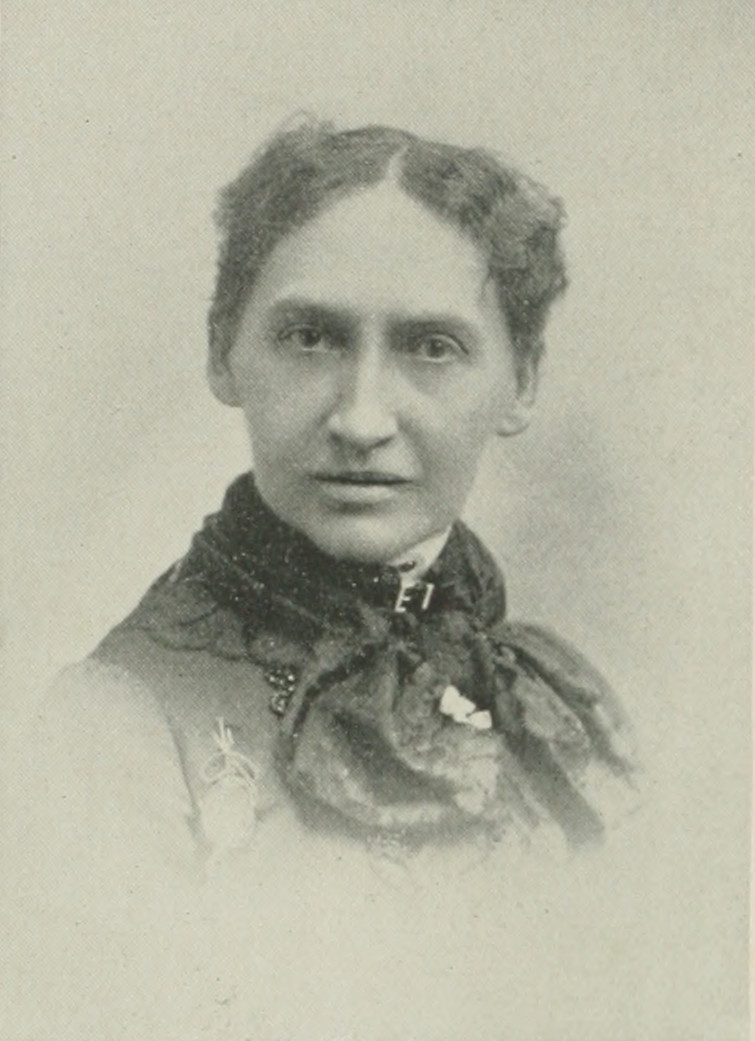
- Portrait from A Woman of the Century
- Born: Frances Laura Damon; February 6, 1837; Strongsville, Ohio, U.S.
- Died: January 9, 1916 (aged 78); Colorado Springs, Colorado
- Occupation(s): church and temperance leader
- Known for: President, Pennsylvania Woman's Christian Temperance Union
- Spouse: Eliot E. Swift (m. 1857; died 1887)

Signature
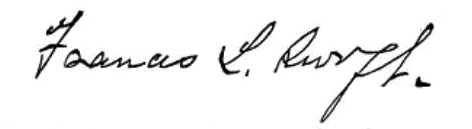

Frances L. Swift (1837–1916) was an American church and temperance leader. For eight years, she served as president of the Pennsylvania Woman's Christian Temperance Union (WCTU).

== Early life and education ==
Frances Laura Damon was born in Strongsville, Ohio, February 6, 1837. She was descended from New England ancestors, the Damons, who settled in Massachusetts 200 years earlier. Her mother removed to Ohio, after the death of her father.

Swift was educated in the Springfield Female Seminary, and taught there subsequently, in keeping with a New England style of education.

== Career ==
On August 12, 1857, she married Dr. Eliot E. Swift (d. 1887), of New Castle, Pennsylvania, a young Presbyterian minister. He was a descendant of the first Native American missionary, John Eliot. Dr. Swift was called to the assistance of his father, pastor of the First Presbyterian Church of Allegheny, Pennsylvania, whom he succeeded, and where he and his wife worked for 26 years.

The tocsin of the Women's Crusade (1873–1874) brought out Swift's prompt response. She organized the Bellevue Union on January 17, 1881, at the Bellevue Presbyterian Church, becoming the leader of the first crusade band in the State. The Brown's Chapel Union organized by Swift in 1881 or 1882, was reported the only colored Union in the State. Forty-three delegates attended the first State Convention of the WCTU for organization at Philadelphia, March 3, 1875, fifteen of whom came from Allegheny County, including Swift.

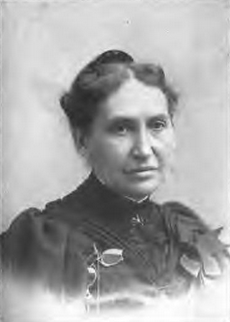
(1899)

From 1881 to 1889, the State work prospered under Swift's care as state president of the Pennsylvania WCTU. Under her leadership, the Juvenile Literature and Scientific Instruction Departments became successful, and the Constitutional Amendment work received the continued support of the WCTU throughout the State. Dr. Swift's example helped the cause of temperance, gaining the cooperation of other ministers, and opening doors of opportunity. During her tensure, the State WCTU reported to the National Convention the work of 1,051 Unions, easily outranking all other States. As a striking testimony to her urbanity, former Presidents of both State and National WCTU occupied superintendencies under her guidance. In 1887, she resigned the position of president of the State WCTU, having had 1,100 unions under her care. During the eight consecutive years that Swift served as president of the State WCTU, she also served as president of the local union, where she first pledged herself.

She was vice-president of the Woman's Board of Foreign Missions of her church, a member of the Board of State Charities, and actively identified with many benevolent institutions of the city.

== Personal life ==
Dr. and Mrs. Swift had five children: George, Elisha, Mary, Elisha, and Mary.

In 1887, she went to Europe for 18 months with her daughter and two other young women.

Frances Laura Swift died on January 9, 1916, in Colorado Springs, Colorado.
