= Jelloway, Ohio =

- Unincorporated community
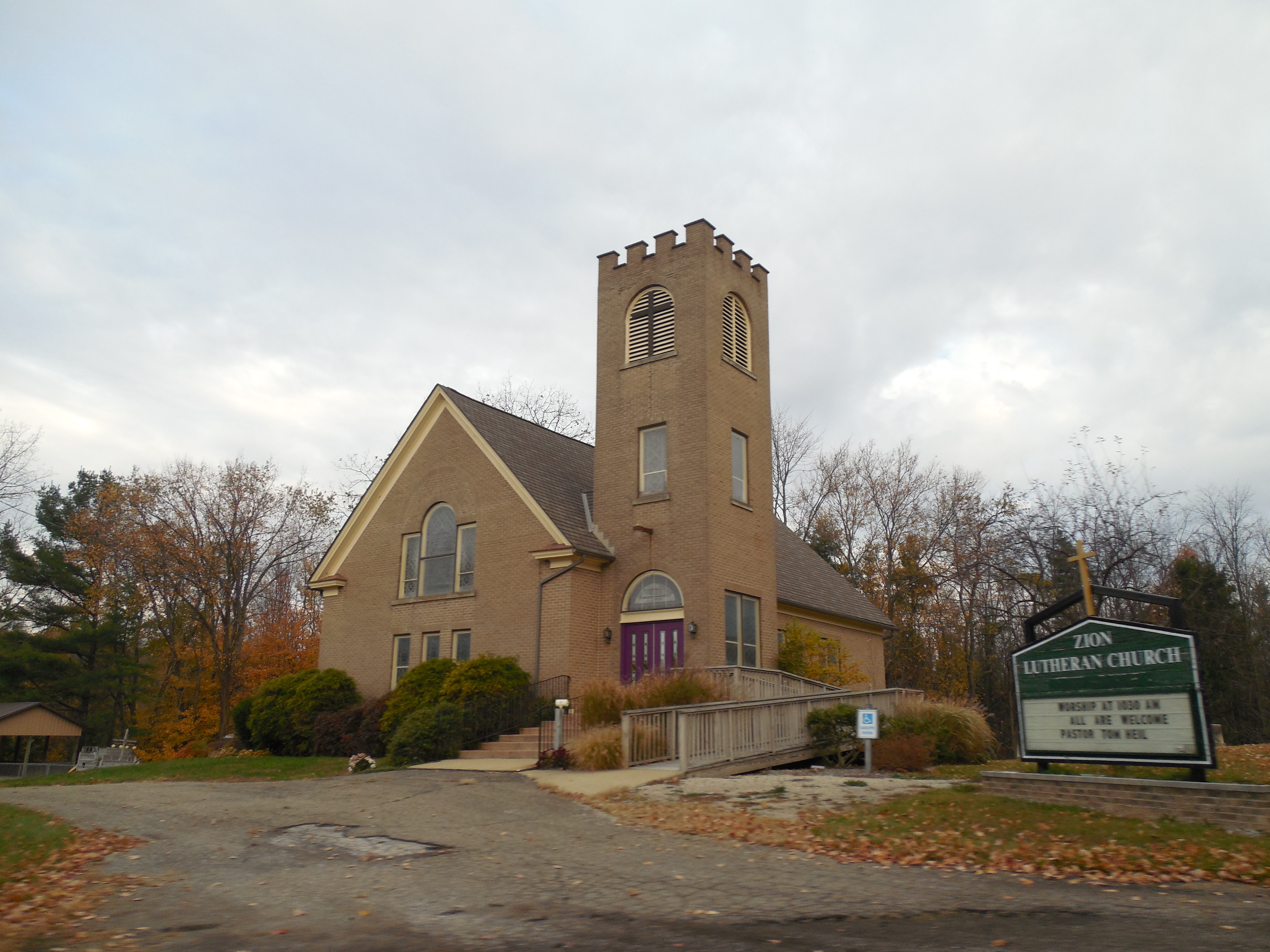
- Zion Lutheran Church in Jelloway

- Location within Ohio Location within the United States
- Coordinates: 40°32′12″N 82°18′01″W
- Country: United States
- State: Ohio
- County: Knox
- Township: Brown
- Elevation: 1,043 ft (318 m)
- Time zone: UTC-5 (Eastern (EST))
  - Summer (DST): UTC-4 (EDT)
- Area code: 740
- GNIS feature ID: 1064905

Jelloway is an unincorporated community in Brown Township, Knox County, Ohio, United States. Jelloway is located at the junction of Ohio State Route 3 and Ohio State Route 205, 14 miles (23 km) northeast of Mount Vernon.

== History ==
Jelloway was originally called Brownsville, and under the latter name was laid out in 1840. The present name comes from nearby Jelloway Creek. A post office called Jelloway was established in 1842, and remained in operation until 1918.
