= Tim Kamczyc =

American basketball player

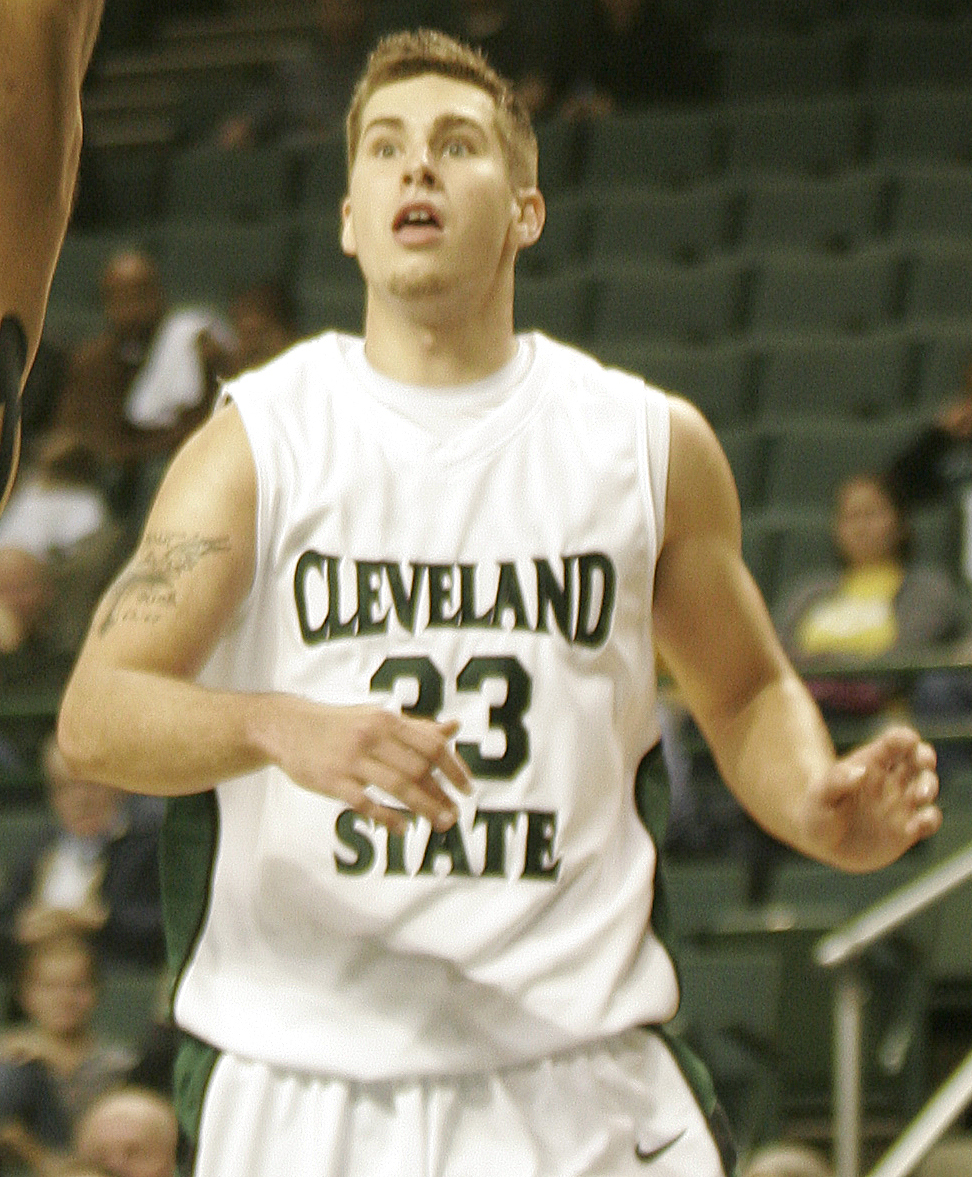
- Kamczyc with Cleveland State in 2010

Personal information
- Born: January 8, 1990 (age 36)
- Listed height: 6 ft 7 in (2.01 m)
- Listed weight: 224 lb (102 kg)

Career information
- High school: Strongsville (Strongsville, Ohio)
- College: Cleveland State (2009–2013)
- NBA draft: 2013: undrafted
- Playing career: 2013–2014
- Position: Small forward / power forward

Career history
- 2013–2014: Aris Leeuwarden

Tim Kamczyc (born January 8, 1990) is an American former professional basketball player.

== Professional career ==
In September 2013, Kamczyc signed with Aris Leeuwarden of the Dutch Basketball League (DBL). He averaged 7.7 points and 3.2 rebounds per game over 38 games in the DBL. Aris finished in the seventh place in the DBL standings.
