= Ramser Arboretum =

Arboretum in Danville, Ohio, United States

Coordinates: 40°32′10″N 82°17′59″W

- Interactive map of Ramser Arboretum
- Area: 680 acres (280 ha)
- Website: ramserarboretum.org

Ramser Arboretum is an arboretum at the intersection of Ohio State Route 3 and Ohio State Route 205 in Jelloway, Ohio. Although privately owned, the arboretum is open to the public year-round except for deer-hunting season. Ramser Arboretum was founded by businessman and farmer Russell Ramser. The arboretum includes the Mount Vernon Nazarene University Woods.

The arboretum contains 680 acres of native woodland, planted hardwood, and agricultural land, with five miles of hiking trails on hilly terrain.

== See also ==
- List of botanical gardens in the United States
