= Five Rivers MetroParks =

Park district in Ohio, United States

Five Rivers MetroParks System
- Five Rivers MetroParks
- Type: public park district
- Location: Greater Dayton, Ohio, United States
- Area: 15,418 acres (62.39 km^{2})
- Created: 1963
- Open: All year
- Facilities: 25

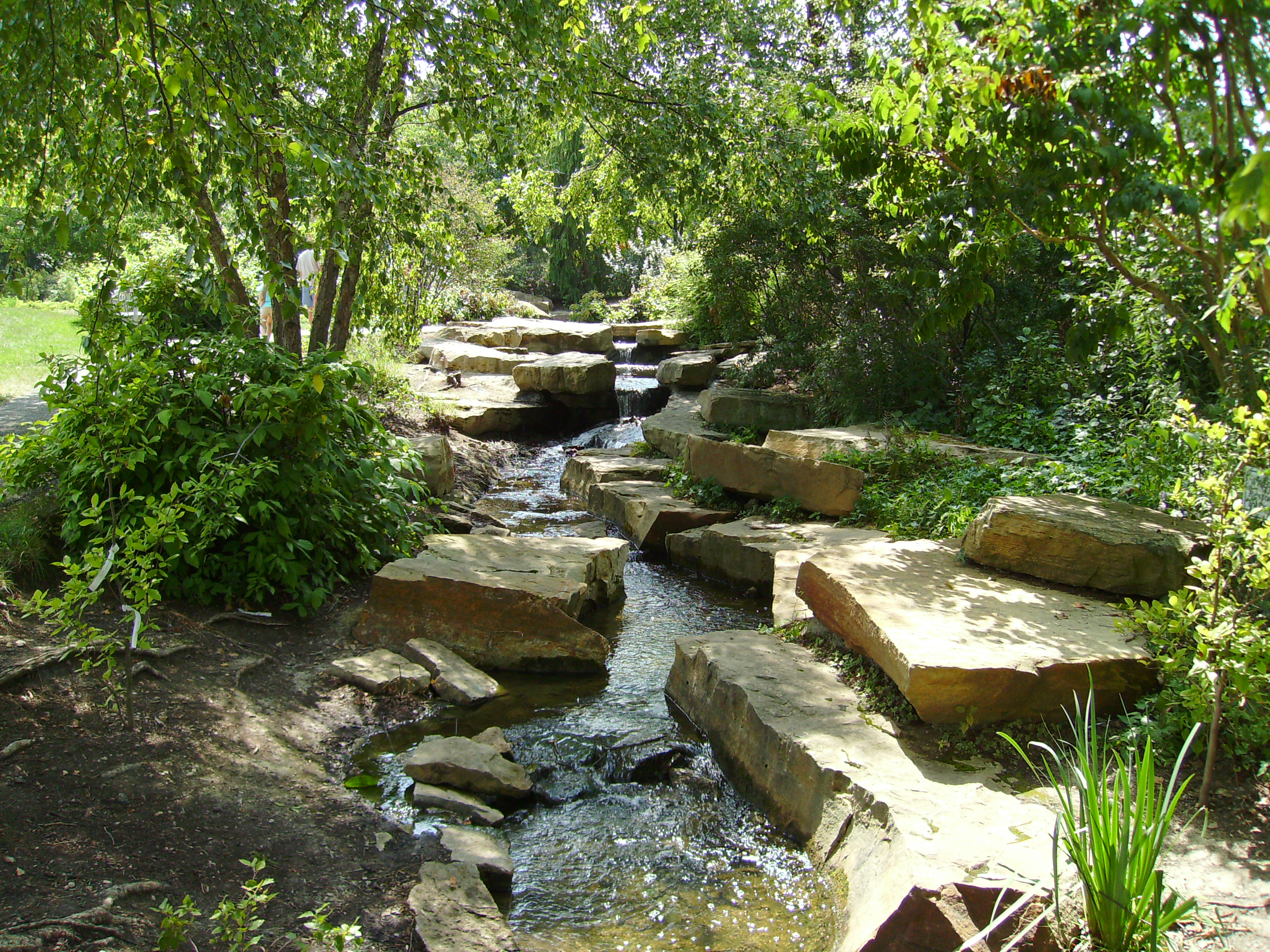
Cox Arboretum and Gardens MetroPark

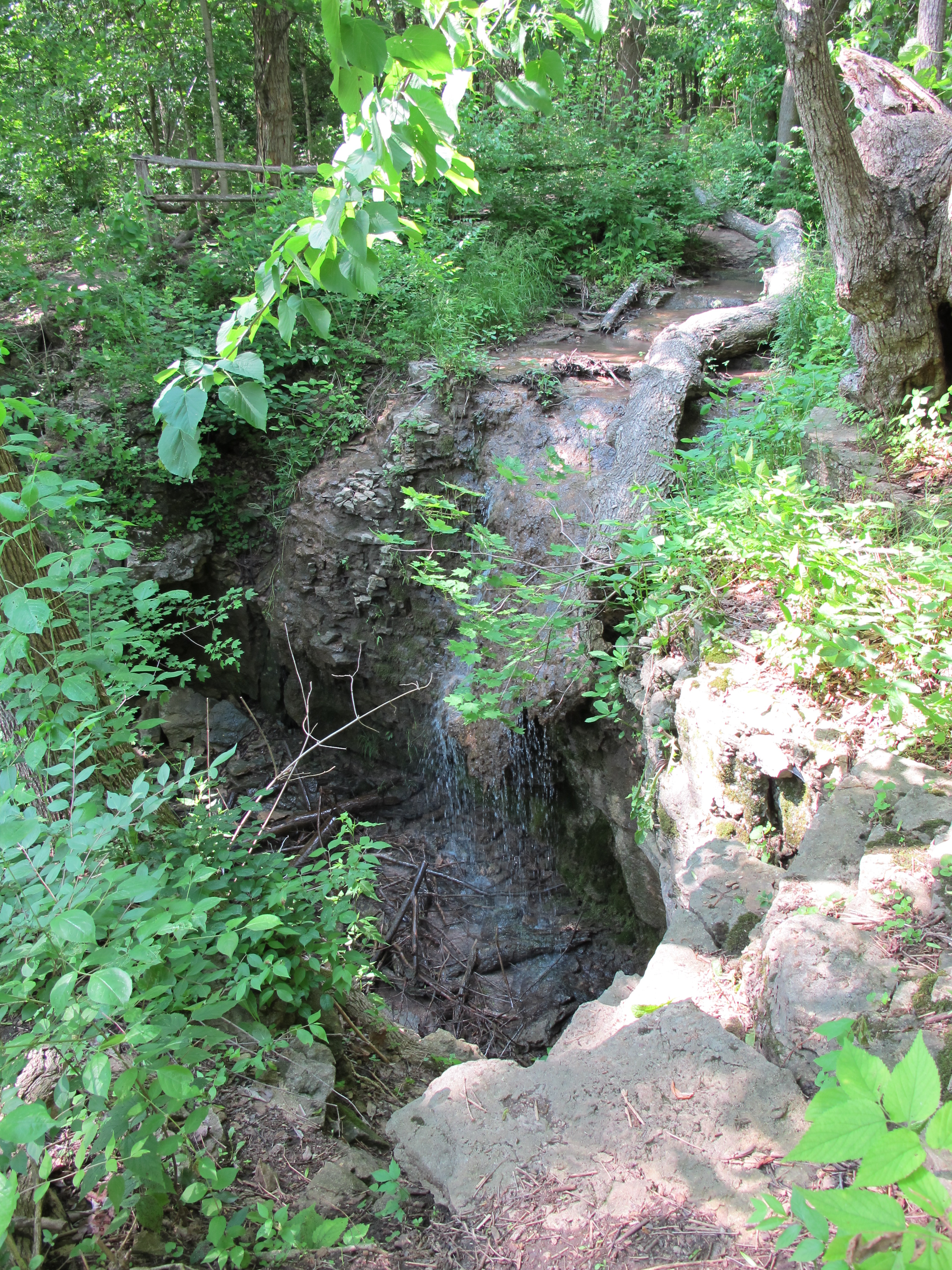
Small waterfall at Englewood MetroPark

Five Rivers MetroParks is a regional public park system consisting of conservatories and outdoor recreation and education facilities that serve the Dayton metropolitan area. The name Five Rivers MetroParks comes from five major waterways that converge in Dayton. These waterways are the Great Miami River, Mad River, Stillwater River, Wolf Creek, and Twin Creek. Five Rivers MetroParks comprises more than 15,400 acres (62 km^{2}) and 25 facilities with a number of amenities and features. These include hiking trails, a mountain bike area (MoMBA) at Huffman MetroPark, horse bridle trails, a disc golf course, a whitewater feature at Eastwood MetroPark, and a large butterfly house at Cox Arboretum MetroPark. Five Rivers MetroParks provides year-round recreation, education and conservation opportunities to the Greater Dayton community.

== Metropark facilities ==
The Metropark's 19 facilities are:

1. Aullwood House and Garden MetroPark, Englewood
2. Carriage Hill MetroPark, Huber Heights
3. Cox Arboretum and Gardens MetroPark, Dayton
4. Deeds Point MetroPark, Dayton
5. Eastwood MetroPark, Dayton
6. Englewood MetroPark, Englewood
7. Germantown MetroPark, Germantown
8. Hills & Dales MetroPark, Kettering
9. Huffman MetroPark, Fairborn
10. Island MetroPark, Dayton:
11. Possum Creek MetroPark, Dayton
12. RiverScape MetroPark, Dayton
13. 2nd Street Market, Dayton
14. Sugarcreek MetroPark, Sugarcreek Township
15. Sunrise MetroPark, Dayton
16. Taylorsville MetroPark, Vandalia
17. Twin Creek MetroPark, Germantown
18. Wegerzyn Gardens MetroPark, Dayton
19. Wesleyan MetroPark, Dayton

The Metropark's 8 conservation area's include:

- Dull Woods Conservation Area
- Medlar Conservation Area (added December 2010)
- Needmore Conservation Area
- Pigeye Conservation Area
- Sandridge Prairie Conservation Area
- Shiloh Woods Conservation Area
- Twin Valley Conservation Area
- Woodman Fen Conservation Area

== History ==
=== Individual park histories ===
2nd Street Market is public market located on East Second Street near downtown Dayton. More than 200,000 people visit the market year-round. Local merchants sell produce, flowers, baked goods, as well as homemade food and craft items. Entertainment includes local musicians, singers and dancers.

Carriage Hill MetroPark is a 900 acre recreated, historic farm representing 19th century farming methods including historically accurate farm animal breeds. The farm has been operated as an education center since at least 1975. The historic property features the former home of the Arnolds, a German Baptist family, that lived and worked the farm for generations in the 1800s. Their farmhouse, a vernacular federal style brick structure, along with blacksmith and woodworking outbuildings are maintained.

Island MetroPark is a river island located where the Stillwater and Miami Rivers meet. The park was built on the former location of the White City Amusement Park, which began operation in the late 1880s, but did not survive the Great Dayton Flood of 1913. Island Park opened and the Dayton Canoe Club held its first regatta there both in 1914. In addition to public park amenities, it is also the site of the Art Deco-style Leslie L. Diehl Band Shell, a WPA project, which was constructed in 1939. Today the Greater Dayton Rowing Association Boat House is located within the park, and it is a known birding location for black-crowned night herons.

The RiverScape Metropark fountain shoots 2,500 US gallons (9.5 m^{3}) of water per minute toward the center of the river. The central geyser of the fountain rises from the jets 200 ft (60 m) in the air. Covering 395,000 square feet (36,700 square meters) across an 800 ft (244 m) diameter, the Five Rivers Fountain of Lights is one of the largest fountains in the world.
