= 2nd Street Market =

Public market in Dayton, Ohio

Coordinates: 39°45′45″N 84°10′51″W

The 2nd Street Market is a public market in Dayton, Ohio. The market is located at the corner of Webster Street and East 2nd Street. It is Dayton's largest and oldest operating public market. In 2012, Country Living Magazine mentioned the market in its piece called “50 Things To Do This Summer in 50 States”. The market is owned and operated by Five Rivers MetroParks.

== History and information ==
The market began as an extension of the Wegerzyn Outdoor Farmers Market, which moved to the Cannery building on Wayne Avenue to provide an indoor setting and to extend its season in the late 1990s. In November 2001, the market moved to its present location in a former Baltimore and Ohio Railroad warehouse built-in 1911. The building was saved from demolition and renovated in 2001 in partnership with Five Rivers Metro Parks, Webster Station Development Group, City of Dayton, and PNC Bank. The 2nd Street Market attracts roughly 370,000 people each year.

The market is open three days a week year-round Friday, Saturday, and Sunday. Because the market is, for the most part, enclosed, the weather does not affect the hours of operation though crowds are biggest during the summer months. Additional outside stalls are set up in the warm weather months. Beginning in 2024 MetroParks began offering special Thursday night hours geared towards capitalizing on the ambiance and experience of being in this historic building during the twilight hours. They are still offering these hours every third Thursday of the month, check the events on their website for details.

Local produce and baked goods are the most popular and readily available items at The 2nd Street Market. In-season produce is always for sale, including fruits, vegetables, and eggs. A variety of cheeses are offered at several stands as well as foods such as honey, maple syrup, and coffee beans. Fresh, homemade baked goods dominate the morning hours and are often enjoyed by visitors as a breakfast treat. Organic items and meats are also available at some stalls. Some stands offer luncheon fare including both sandwiches and full platters. The market contains more than 50 different vendors.

Entertainment at The 2nd Street Market occurs year-round and often marks special occasions such as Mardi Gras, St. Patrick's Day, or Christmas.

== Gallery ==
Note: Images were taken on a non-operating day.

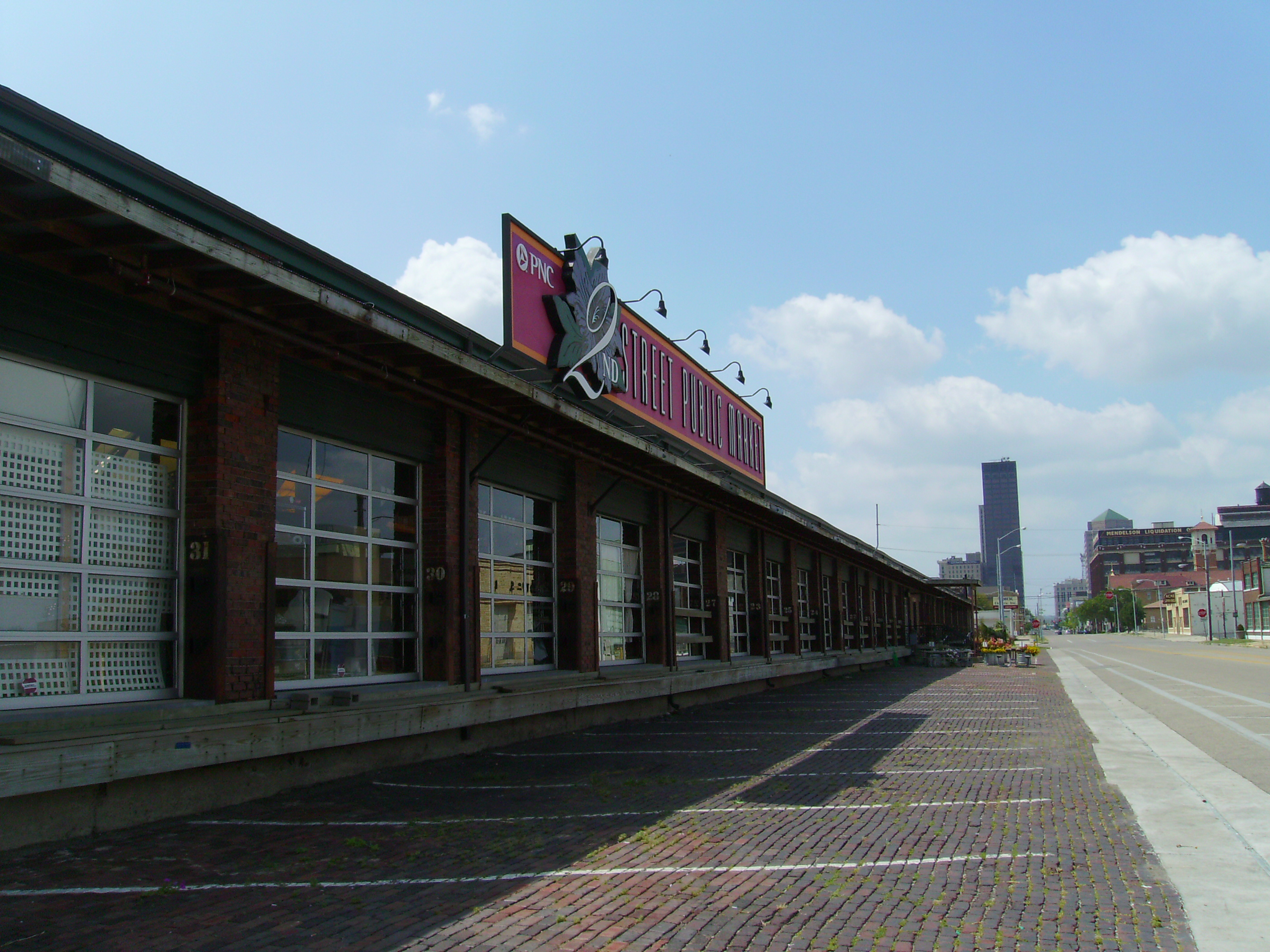
On regular operating days, many vendors will open the stations on this side of the market and set up shop outside of the doors to sell their goods.

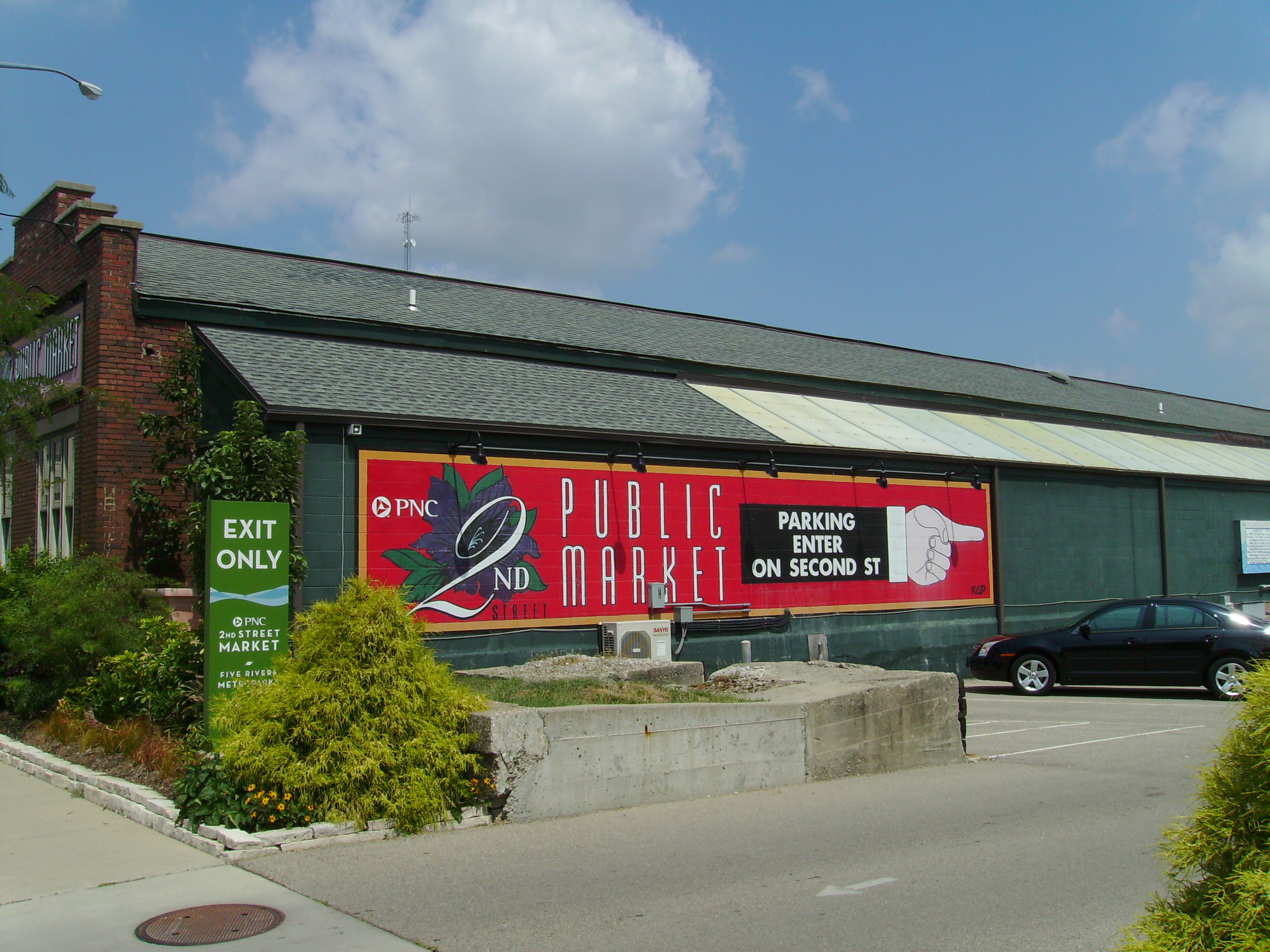
South entrance and parking at the market.

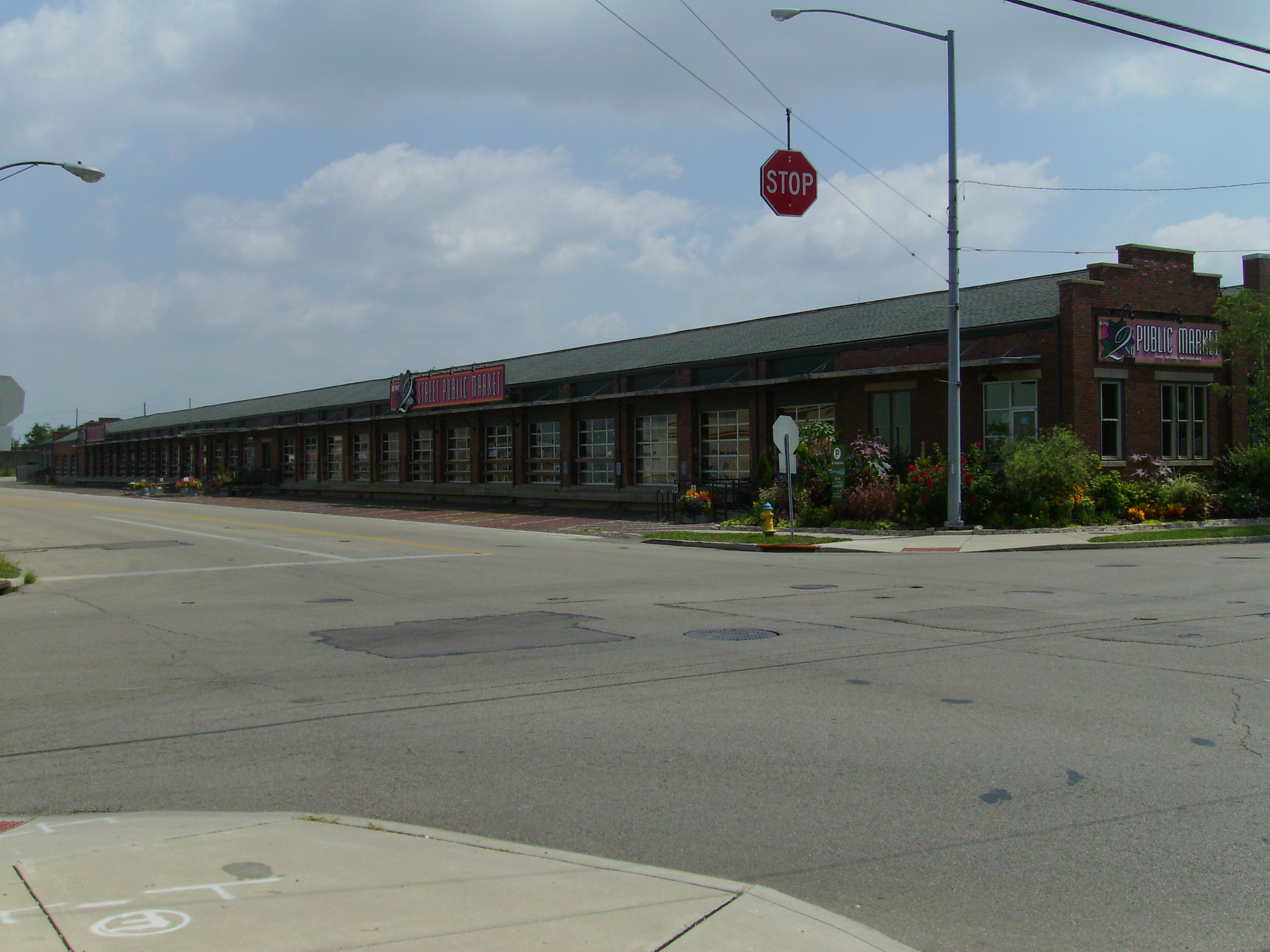
A view of the market at West Second Street and Webster Street.

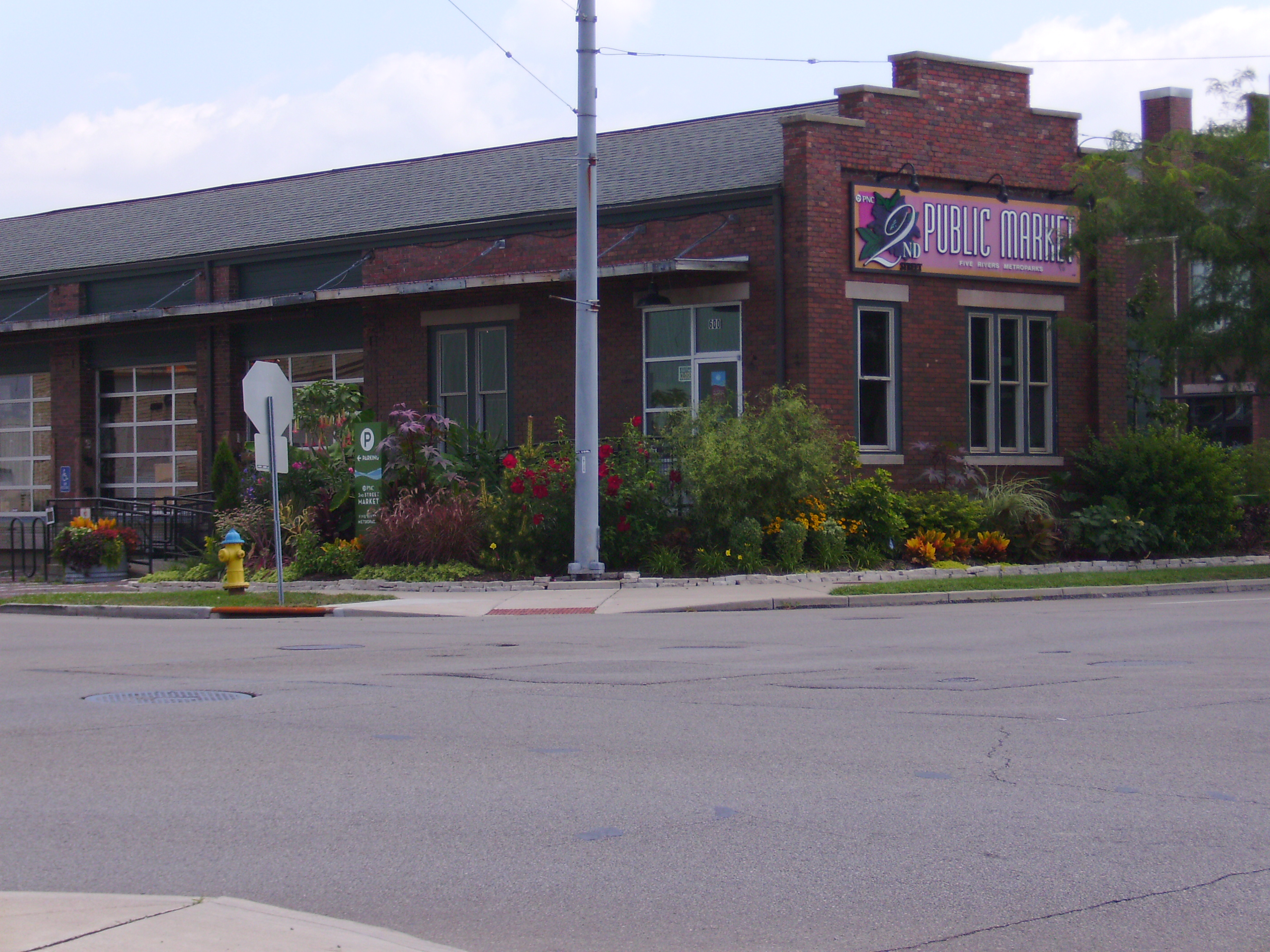
North-east entrance
