= Walter F. Ehrnfelt =

American politician

Walter F. Ehrnfelt, Jr. (December 10, 1932 – May 25, 2003) was an American politician. He was Mayor of Strongsville, Ohio for 25 years. He was also a Northeast Ohio Areawide Coordinating Agency (NOACA) Governing Board member.

== Career ==
After graduating from Strongsville High School, Ehrnfelt began his career in 1973, while running Ehrnfelt Meats, his family's local business. He was persuaded to run for the Strongsville School Board, leading the fight against a campaign to dismiss teachers and ban books in the school district. He won that race, and in 1978 he was appointed Mayor of Strongsville, later winning his first Mayoral race in November 1979 by more than a 2 to 1 margin. Voters rewarded his effective leadership by re-electing him to six consecutive four-year terms, the last beginning in 2000, making him Cuyahoga County's longest standing mayor. He served on Governor Taft's State and Local Government Commission and was President of the Ohio Municipal League. He died unexpectedly of a heart attack aged 70.

== Legacy ==
- Walter F. Ehrnfelt, Jr. Award for Outstanding Regional Contribution
- Ehrnfelt covered bridge is named in his honor.
- The Ehrnfelt Recreational Center, located in Strongsville, is also named in his honor.
