= Cox Arboretum and Gardens MetroPark =

Botanical garden and park in Dayton, Ohio, United States

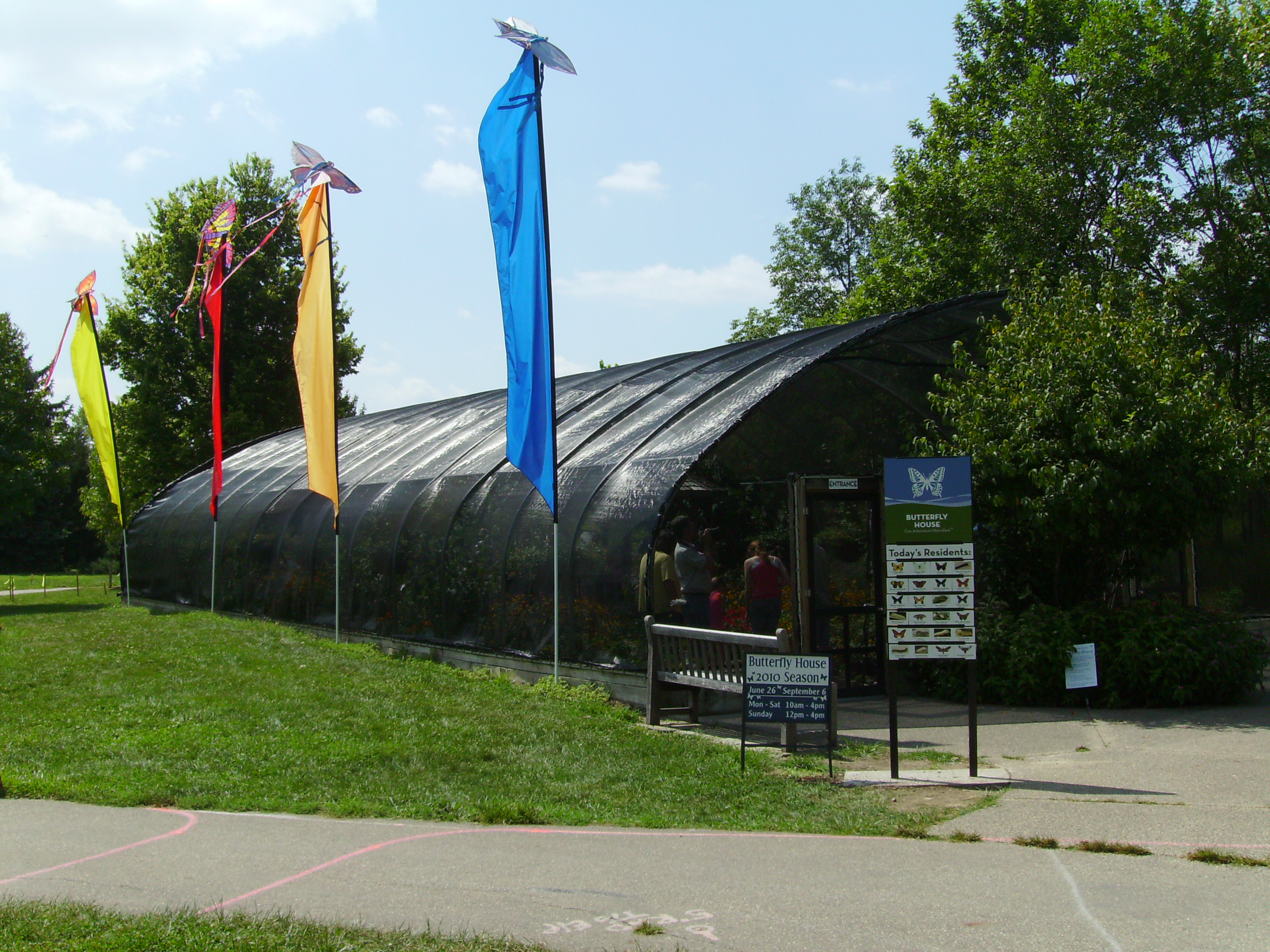
- The butterfly house at the MetroPark
- Interactive map of Cox Arboretum and Gardens MetroPark
- Type: Botanical garden and park
- Nearest city: Dayton, Ohio
- Coordinates: 39.65368°N 84.22789°W
- Area: 189 acres (76 ha)
- Created: 1962
- Operator: Five Rivers Metroparks
- Website: Official website

The Cox Arboretum and Gardens MetroPark is a 189 acres (76 ha) arboretum and park located at 6733 Springboro Pike, Dayton, Ohio (in Miami Township, south of the city proper). It is open daily without charge. Cox Arboretum and Gardens MetroPark is one of many Dayton area parks within the Five Rivers Metroparks system.

James M. Cox Jr. purchased farmland in the early 1950s that became a nature getaway that his family called Spring Running. In the 1960s, an effort to construct a housing development on the land was prevented when an extended Cox family member, Jean Mahoney, persuaded James M. Cox Jr to preserve the land as an arboretum. The family donated the property to a nonprofit foundation, and Jean Mahoney became the first director. Mahoney collaborated with Ruth Burke and Marie Aull to cultivate the arboretum. In 1972 the land was given to Montgomery County Park District, now known as the Five Rivers Metroparks, in a public/private partnership.

The arboretum contains a shrub garden with over 500 varieties of trees and shrubs, butterfly house and garden, small lake, children's maze, conifer knoll, crab apple allee, herb garden, ornamental grass collection, perennial garden, rock garden, water garden, woodland wildflower garden, and 2.5 miles (4.0 km) of walking trails.

Cox Arboretum is a resource for gardeners and arborists with research and a publication on ivy plants.

== See also ==
- List of botanical gardens in the United States
