= Ranger Lake =

- Location within Ohio Location within the United States
- Location: Strongsville, Cuyahoga County, Ohio, United States
- Coordinates: 41°20′12″N 81°49′31″W
- Type: reservoir
- Basin countries: United States
- Surface area: 1.5 acres (0.61 ha)
- Settlements: Strongsville

Ranger Lake is a 1.5 acres (0.61 ha) reservoir located in the Cleveland Metroparks Mill Stream Run Reservation in Strongsville, Cuyahoga County, Ohio.

The lake has been stocked to establish sport fishing populations of largemouth bass, bluegill, pumpkinseed sunfish, crappie, channel catfish, and rainbow trout. The lake is stocked with trout in the winter for ice fishing.

Prior to flooding the lake, the tree and brush cover along the west side of the lake was left standing to provide improved fish habitat. Fishermen will find this area productive for catching fish.

Special fishing regulations are posted at Ranger Lake for largemouth bass and rainbow trout. The minimum legal size for catching largemouth bass is 12 inches (300 mm) and the daily harvest is two bass per angler. The daily harvest for rainbow trout is three fish per angler.

== Notes ==
A: Coordinates obtained from Google by plotting intersection mentioned in Cleveland Metroparks' description of Ranger Lake's location and manually adjusting.
