= Gardenview Horticultural Park =

Nonprofit botanical garden and arboretum in Strongsville, Ohio, United States

Coordinates: 41°18′46″N 81°49′55″W

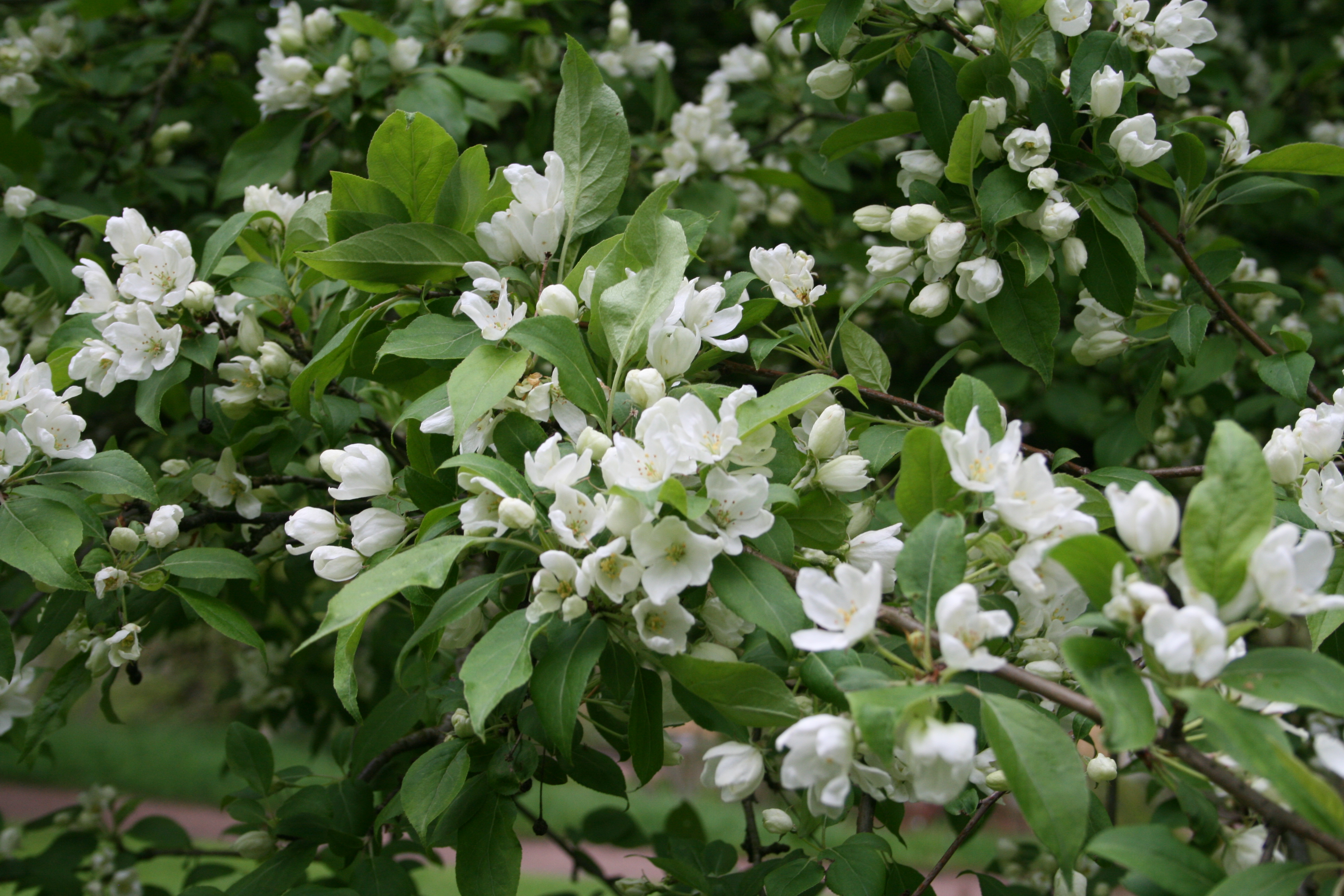
- Malus baccata can be found in the park.
- Interactive map of Gardenview Horticultural Park
- Type: Botanical garden
- Location: Strongsville, Ohio
- Area: 16 acres (6.5 ha)
- Opened: 1961
- Founder: Henry Ross
- Open: April 1 – October 15; Tuesday–Friday: 10:00–5:00; Saturday and Sunday: 12:00–6:00
- Website: www.gardenviewhp.org

Gardenview Horticultural Park (16 acres) is a nonprofit botanical garden and arboretum located at 16711 Pearl Road, Strongsville, Ohio. It is open weekend afternoons to non-members; an admission fee is charged.

The park was begun in 1949 by horticulturist Henry Ross (deceased November 1, 2014) on a private lot filled with blackberry brambles and weeds atop blue and yellow clay. In his extensive work on the garden, Ross has introduced dozens of cultivars including the white-leafed Ajuga 'Arctic Fox' and the mildew-resistant Monarda 'Gardenview Scarlet'. He opened the garden for public viewing in 1961.

The park now includes 6 acres (24,000 m^{2}) of English Cottage Gardens (emphasizing plants with variegated, golden, silver, or colored foliage) and a 10-acre (40,000 m^{2}) arboretum. The arboretum contains some 2,500 unusual trees, including 500 varieties of flowering crabapples underplanted with daffodils. The garden also features azaleas, 1,500 tuberous rooted begonias, thousands of tulips, a cactus collection, and two ponds.

== See also ==
- List of botanical gardens in the United States
