= Strongsville, Ohio =

- City
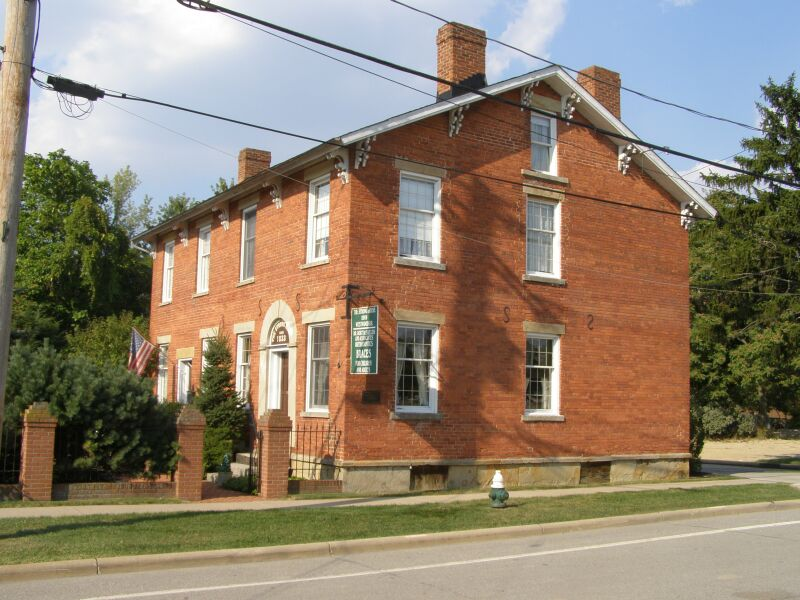
- North side of Strongsville's Town Square

- Flag Seal
- Nickname: Crossroads of the Nation
- Interactive map of Strongsville, Ohio
- Location within Ohio Location within the United States
- Coordinates: 41°18′46″N 81°49′55″W
- Country: United States
- State: Ohio
- County: Cuyahoga
- Township created: 1818
- Village created: 1923
- Incorporated: 1961; 63 years ago

Government
  - Type: Mayor-council
  - Mayor: Thomas Perciak (R)

Area
  - Total: 24.63 sq mi (63.79 km^{2})
  - Land: 24.62 sq mi (63.77 km^{2})
  - Water: 0.0077 sq mi (0.02 km^{2}) 0.04%
- Elevation: 932 ft (284 m)

Population (2020)
  - Total: 46,491
  - Density: 1,888.2/sq mi (729.04/km^{2})
- census
- Time zone: UTC-5 (EST)
  - Summer (DST): UTC-4 (EDT)
- Zip code: 44136, 44149
- Area code: 440
- FIPS code: 39-75098
- GNIS feature ID: 1065396
- Website: strongsville.org

Strongsville is a city in Cuyahoga County, Ohio, United States, and a suburb of Cleveland. As of the 2020 census, its population was 46,491.

The city's nickname, Crossroads of the Nation, originated from the intersection between the Baltimore and Ohio Railroad and Southwestern Electric Line that connected Cleveland and Wooster, Ohio. As the railroad line ceased operation in 1931, the motto and city seal have been adapted to reflect the modern-day intersection of Interstate 71 and the Ohio Turnpike.

== History ==
Founded by settlers arriving in the newly purchased Connecticut Western Reserve, the city was named after John Stoughton Strong, the group's leader. He brought his oldest son, Emory Strong, his brother-in-law Elijah Lyman Sr., and Guilford Whitney, another relative of the Strongs. Along with Whitney came his daughter, her husband John Hilliard, and their daughter. Other pioneers in the group included William Fuller Jr., Obadiah Church, Zachariah Goodale, and George Fox Gilbert. They arrived in 1816 and cleared enough land to construct log cabins. The 25-square-mile area of land was surveyed and divided into lots for John Stoughton Strong to sell off by agreement with Oliver Ellsworth of Hartford, Connecticut. Strongsville officially became Township No. 5, 14th range on February 25, 1818. Strongsville became a village in 1923 and was ultimately designated a city in 1961.

John Stoughton Strong, originally from Vermont, was instrumental in Strongsville's establishment and early growth. He drew in settlers from New York, Pennsylvania, and New England by driving cattle that he obtained to markets in those states. In the following years, he oversaw the development of settlements, roads, businesses, schools, and churches. He had the first mill built in 1820 on the Rocky River in Albion. While it is no longer standing, the dam and foundation still exist in what is now Bonnie Park. He also brought in settlers with specialized skills, such as Dr. William Baldwin as the town doctor. The John Stoughton Strong House was added to the National Register of Historic Places on November 24, 1980.

Many of the main streets in the city are named after other principal figures and landowners from the city's history, e.g. Howe, Drake, Shurmer, and Whitney.

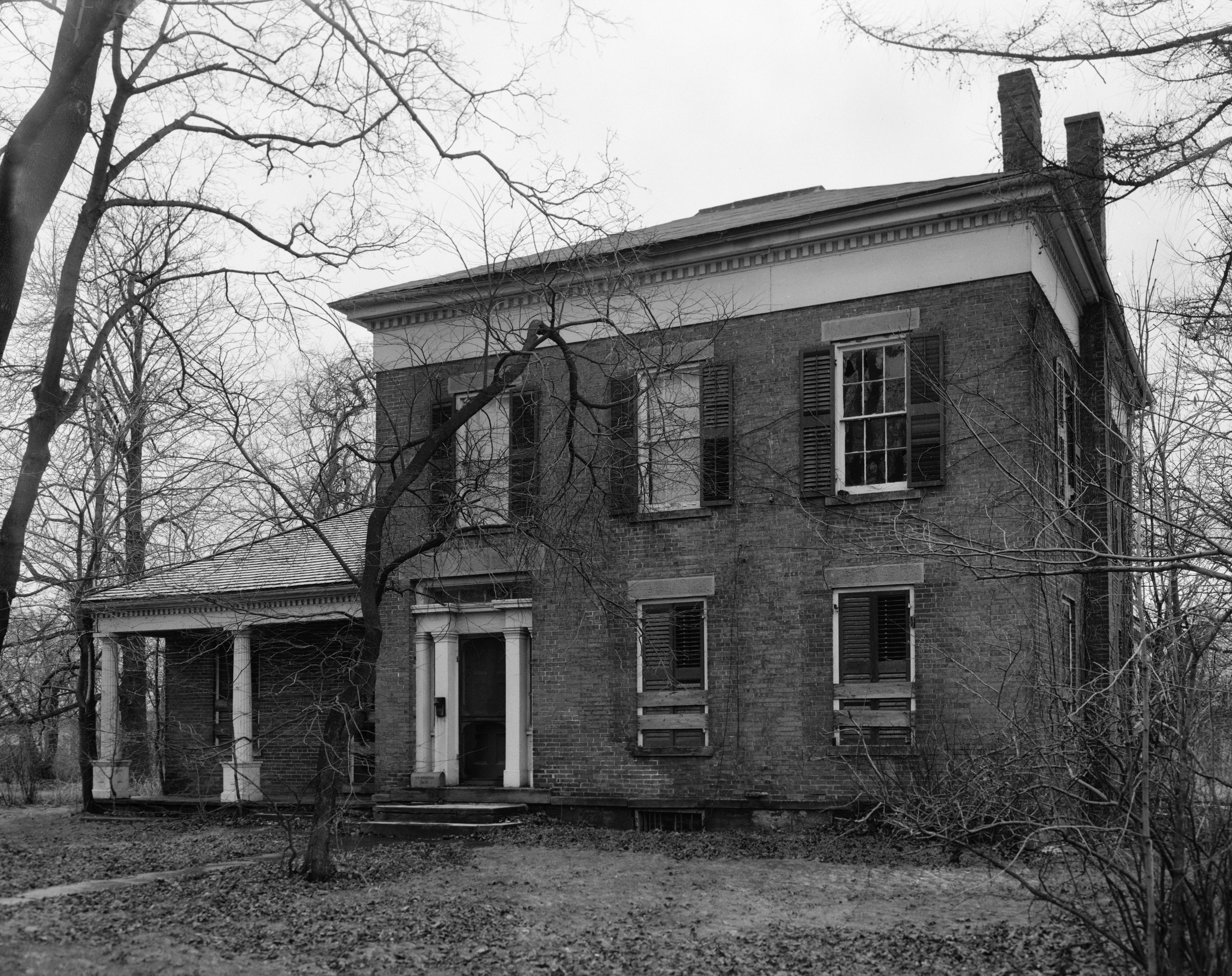
A Historic American Landscapes Survey photograph of the Alanson Pomeroy House.

The Pomeroy House, built in 1847, was known as the Homestead for over a century. Alanson Pomeroy, the homeowner and prominent Strongsville resident, hosted members of the Congregational Church, of which he was an active member. He also opened his spare room to travelers. During the Civil War, the Homestead became a stop on the Underground Railroad, where he concealed runaway slaves on his property. From this residence in Strongsville, the runaway slaves were taken to boats on the Rocky River for passage to Canada.

The Alanson Pomeroy House was added to the National Register of Historic Places in June 1975. After a few years of renovation, it opened as Don's Pomeroy House Restaurant & Pub in 1980. Guests can dine in the library, the old dining room, the study, or the parlor. The pub is located downstairs and the upstairs bedrooms now serve as private dining rooms.

In 1853, John D. Rockefeller's family moved to Strongsville. At the time, Rockefeller was a child.

On April 11, 1965, an F4 tornado hit Strongsville; it was part of the 1965 Palm Sunday tornado outbreak in the region.

=== National Register of Historic Places ===
- Alanson Pomeroy House
- John Stoughton Strong House
- Strongsville Town Hall
- Valerius C. Stone House

== Geography ==
Strongsville is located at 41°18′46″N 81°49′55″W (41.312752, -81.831976).

According to the United States Census Bureau, the city has a total area of 24.64 square miles (63.82 km^{2}), of which 0.01 square miles (0.03 km^{2}) is covered by water. The east branch of the Rocky River enters Strongsville from North Royalton and exits into Berea. Valley Parkway parallels the river's northwesterly course. This portion of the Cleveland Metroparks, named Mill Stream Run, includes Bonnie Park and Ranger Lake. Abutting the Rocky River, the recreation area offers visitors a pavilion, picnicking facilities, two small ponds, and several sport fields. Bonnie Park serves as a hub for hiking, bridle, and paved multipurpose trails.

== Demographics ==
Historical population
Census	Pop.	Note	%±
1930	1,349		—
1940	2,216		64.3%
1950	3,504		58.1%
1960	8,504		142.7%
1970	15,182		78.5%
1980	28,577		88.2%
1990	35,308		23.6%
2000	43,858		24.2%
2010	44,750		2.0%
2020	46,491		3.9%
2025 (est.)	45,629		−1.9%

The median income for a household in the city was $68,660, and the median income for a family was $76,964 (these figures had risen to $79,715 and $90,870 respectively as of a 2007 estimate). Males had a median income of $54,988 versus $33,129 for females. The per capita income for the city was $29,722. About 1.3% of families and 2.2% of the population were below the poverty line, including 1.7% of those under age 18 and 3.7% of those age 65 or over.

Of the city's population over the age of 25, 41.6% held a bachelor's degree or higher.

=== Racial and ethnic composition ===
Strongsville city, Ohio – Racial and ethnic composition Note: the US Census treats Hispanic/Latino as an ethnic category. This table excludes Latinos from the racial categories and assigns them to a separate category. Hispanics/Latinos may be of any race.
Race / Ethnicity (NH = Non-Hispanic)	Pop 2000	Pop 2010	Pop 2020	% 2000	% 2010	% 2020
White alone (NH)	40,929	40,559	39,100	93.32%	90.63%	84.10%
Black or African American alone (NH)	533	813	1,187	1.22%	1.82%	2.55%
Native American or Alaska Native alone (NH)	15	34	50	0.03%	0.08%	0.11%
Asian alone (NH)	1,403	1,816	2,908	3.20%	4.06%	6.25%
Native Hawaiian or Pacific Islander alone (NH)	4	13	14	0.01%	0.03%	0.03%
Other race alone (NH)	15	46	134	0.03%	0.10%	0.29%
Mixed race or Multiracial (NH)	402	557	1,453	0.92%	1.24%	3.13%
Hispanic or Latino (any race)	557	912	1,645	1.27%	2.04%	3.54%
Total	43,858	44,750	46,491	100.00%	100.00%	100.00%

=== 2020 census ===
As of the 2020 census, Strongsville had a population of 46,491. The median age was 45.8 years, with 19.9% of residents under the age of 18 and 22.9% 65 or older. For every 100 females there were 95.1 males, and for every 100 females age 18 and over there were 92.3 males age 18 and over.

98.9% of residents lived in urban areas, while 1.1% lived in rural areas.

There were 18,643 households in Strongsville, of which 27.2% had children under the age of 18 living in them. Of all households, 58.2% were married-couple households, 14.4% were households with a male householder and no spouse or partner present, and 22.6% were households with a female householder and no spouse or partner present. About 26.0% of all households were made up of individuals and 13.8% had someone living alone who was 65 years of age or older.

There were 19,406 housing units, of which 3.9% were vacant. The homeowner vacancy rate was 0.6% and the rental vacancy rate was 7.2%.

Racial composition as of the 2020 census
Race	Number	Percent
White	39,494	84.9%
Black or African American	1,230	2.6%
American Indian and Alaska Native	69	0.1%
Asian	2,925	6.3%
Native Hawaiian and Other Pacific Islander	16	0.0%
Some other race	458	1.0%
Two or more races	2,299	4.9%
Hispanic or Latino (of any race)	1,645	3.5%

=== 2010 census ===
As of the census of 2010, there were 44,750 people, 17,659 households, and 12,563 families living in the city. The population density was 1,816.9 inhabitants per square mile (701.5/km^{2}). There were 18,476 housing units at an average density of 750.1 per square mile (289.6/km^{2}). The racial makeup of the city was 92.0% White, 1.9% African American, 0.1% Native American, 4.1% Asian, 0.4% from other races, and 1.4% from two or more races. Hispanic or Latino of any race were 2.0% of the population.

There were 17,659 households, of which 31.5% had children under the age of 18 living with them, 60.5% were married couples living together, 7.4% had a female householder with no husband present, 3.2% had a male householder with no wife present, and 28.9% were non-families. 24.9% of all households were made up of individuals, and 10.9% had someone living alone who was 65 years of age or older. The average household size was 2.52 and the average family size was 3.04.

The median age in the city was 44.2 years. 23.3% of residents were under the age of 18; 6.4% were between the ages of 18 and 24; 21.6% were from 25 to 44; 32.5% were from 45 to 64; and 16.1% were 65 years of age or older. The gender makeup of the city was 48.6% male and 51.4% female.

=== 2000 census ===
As of the census of 2000, there were 43,858 people, 16,209 households, and 12,383 families living in the city. The population density was 1,779.6 inhabitants per square mile (687.1/km^{2}). There were 16,863 housing units at an average density of 684.2 per square mile (264.2/km^{2}). The racial makeup of the city was 94.18% White, 1.26% African American, 0.05% Native American, 3.21% Asian, 0.01% Pacific Islander, 0.28% from other races, and 1.03% from two or more races. Hispanic or Latino of any race were 1.27% of the population.

There were 16,209 households, out of which 35.9% had children under the age of 18 living with them, 67.5% were married couples living together, 6.4% had a female householder with no husband present, and 23.6% were non-families. 19.9% of all households were made up of individuals, and 7.0% had someone living alone who was 65 years of age or older. The average household size was 2.69 and the average family size was 3.13.

In the city, the population was spread out, with 26.3% under the age of 18, 6.2% from 18 to 24, 28.5% from 25 to 44, 27.6% from 45 to 64, and 11.4% who were 65 years of age or older. The median age was 39 years. For every 100 females, there were 95.3 males. For every 100 females age 18 and over, there were 92.3 males.

== Government ==
The current mayor, Thomas Perciak, was elected in November 2003 following the death of longtime mayor Walter F. Ehrnfelt on May 25, 2003.

== Education ==
Strongsville High School serves students in grades 9 through 12. The city's five elementary schools serve pre-kindergarten through 5th grade: Chapman, Kinsner, Muraski, Surrarrer, and Whitney. With Strongsville's younger student population on the decline, three elementary schools, Allen, Drake and Zellers, closed their doors in recent years. A private Catholic school, St. Joseph and John's, serves children through the 8th grade. In 2012, citizens approved a bond issue for $81 million. The bond money was used to build a new middle school, combining the old Center and Albion middle schools, renovations to the high school, technology upgrades to the elementary schools, and renovations to the preschool. The new middle school was built just in time for the 2016–2017 school year.

	Address	School mascot	Grades
Strongsville High School	20025 Lunn Rd	Mustangs	9th - 12th Grade
Strongsville Middle School	13200 Pearl Rd	Mustangs	6th-8th Grade
Chapman Elementary	13883 Drake Road	Chargers/Mustangs	K-5th Grade
Kinsner Elementary	19091 Waterford Parkway	Cobras	K-5th Grade
Muraski Elementary	20270 Royalton Road	Wildcats	K-5th Grade
Surrarrer Elementary	9306 Priem Road	Roadrunners	K-5th Grade
Whitney Elementary	13548 Whitney Road	Bears	K-5th Grade
Strongsville Early Learning Preschool	19543 Lunn Rd	Mustangs	Preschool

=== 2013 Strongsville City Teachers' Strike ===
The Strongsville City Teachers' Strike was a labor strike organized by the Strongsville Education Association that lasted for eight weeks.

The strike commenced at 12:01 a.m. on March 4, 2013. The dispute is over a number of issues, notably teacher contracts, pay step increases, health insurance premium costs, and general working conditions. The Strongsville Education Association claims the Board does have the money to meet the teachers' salary requirements, but that "the 'projection' figures released by the Board on its website are no more than arbitrary, meaningless figures." The Strongsville Board of Education attests that the district is currently "operating in the red", meaning the district budget deficit will increase drastically if the status quo remains. Several rounds of negotiations over said issues between the S.E.A. and the B.O.E. have taken place since March 2010. The strike ended after eight weeks.

== Transportation ==
The Greater Cleveland Regional Transit Authority provides bus service in the city.

== Places of Interest ==
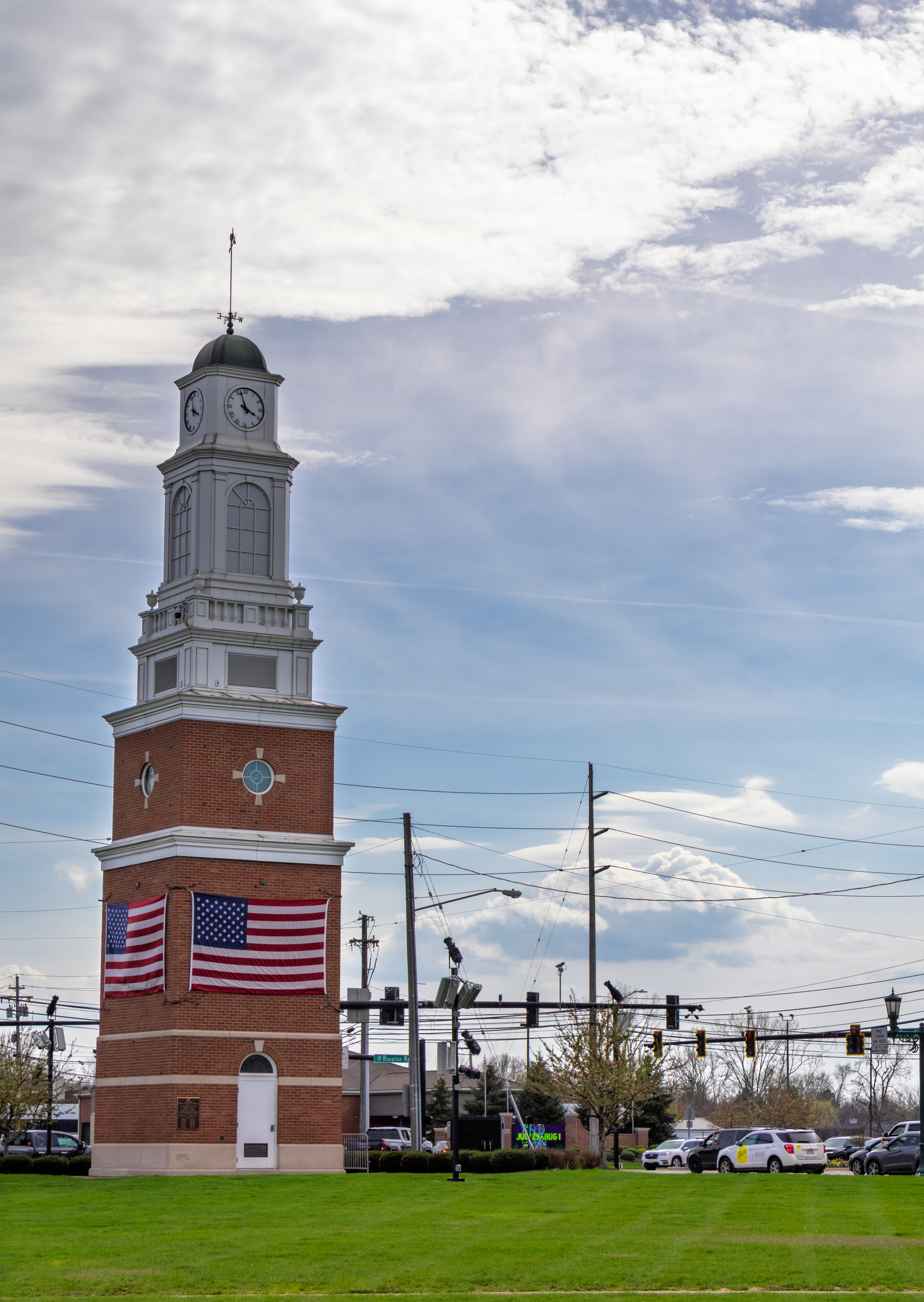
- Strongsville Clock Tower
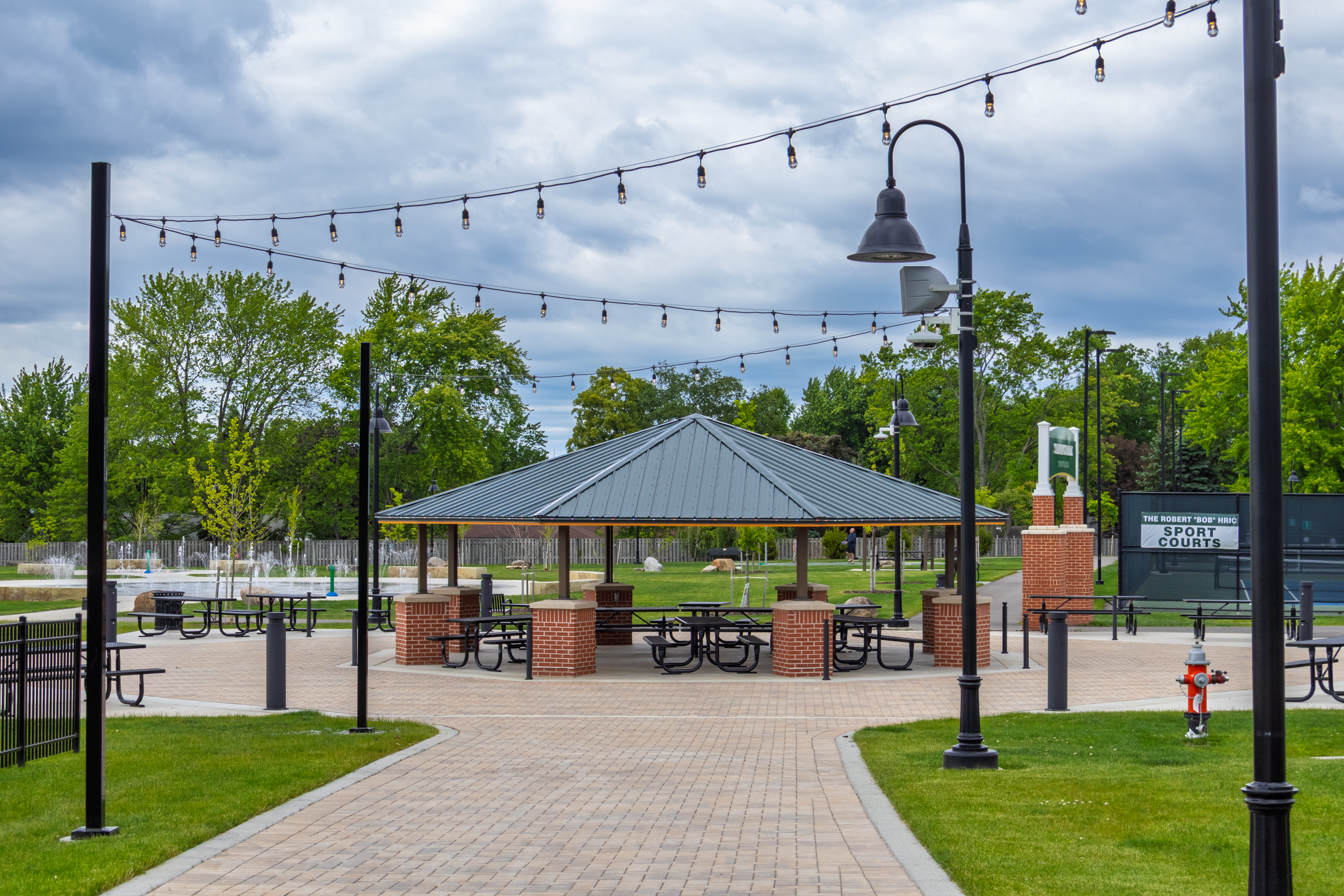
  Strongsville Town Center Park
  Beebetown - Historic neighborhood
- Brunswick Auto Mart Arena, formerly OBM Arena - Strongsville ice rink
- Ehrnfelt Recreation and Senior Center
- Freedom Trail - This paved, mile-long walkway is one of Ohio's largest veteran memorials. It features a gazebo with a directory of war veterans from Strongsville.
- Gardenview Horticultural Park
- Mill Stream Run Reservation - The east branch of the Rocky River runs alongside this branch of the Cleveland Metroparks.
- The Pomeroy House- A former stop on the Underground Railroad
- Preserve of Strongsville - Strongsville's only national preserve.
- Southpark Mall
- Strongsville Business & Technology Park - The largest industrial park in Northeast Ohio
- Strongsville Commons and Clock Tower - The site of many traditional events, including the Strongsville Homecoming, the Rib Burnoff, and the Winter Lighting Ceremony.
- Strongsville Historical Society and Village - The site of original historic buildings from the 19th and early 20th century, as well as a replica of the log cabins built around the time Strongsville was founded. Every September they host a Harvest Festival.
- Strongsville Water Tower - Previously painted by Ziggy creator Tom Wilson. In 2019, the white water tower was repainted green and the Ziggy figure covered.
- Town Center Park - Opened in 2024 as part of Strongsville's Town Center Enhancement and Walkability Initiative. The park includes a community pavilion, improved walkways, two playgrounds with accessibility accommodations, a food truck area with picnic tables, and tennis, pickleball, sand volleyball, and half basketball courts.
- Walter F. Ehrnfelt Covered Bridge

== Notable people ==
- Zebedee Coltrin (1804–1887) Mormon pioneer, authority in Church of Jesus Christ of Latter Day Saints
- Tom Dimitroff Sr. (1935-1996) gridiron football player and coach
- Bruce Drennan (1950-) sportscaster
- Walter F. Ehrnfelt (1932-2003) politician
- Asmahan Farhat (1990-) swimmer
- Jenny Fish (1949-) Olympic speed skater
- Nate Freese football player
- Morris E. Gallup (1825–1893), member of the Ohio House of Representatives
- Jackie Gayda (1981-) professional wrestler
- Olga D. González-Sanabria scientist, inventor
- Joe Haden football player
- Corey Mach, Broadway Actor and founder of Broadway Sings concert series
- Paul Hoernemann (1916-1965) college football coach
- Mark Hunter photographer and lead singer of Chimaira
- Tim Kamczyc (1990-) basketball player
- Drew Kaser, NFL punter
- Reggie Lee (1974-) actor
- Fred McLeod (1952-2019) sportscaster
- Dayton Miller (1866–1941) physicist, astronomer, acoustician
- Tom Patton politician
- Kyle Prandi (1979-) Olympic diver
- Mike Pruitt football player
- John D. Rockefeller (1839-1937) businessman, philanthropist
- William Rockefeller (1841–1922) businessman, financier, co-founder of Standard Oil
- George Myron Sabin (1833-1890) federal judge
- Mackenzie Shirilla (2004 - ) teenage influencer convicted of murdering her boyfriend and their friend; now serving a life sentence
- Isaac Sowells (1982-) football player
- Herb Stein (1898-1980) football player
- Gary Suhadolnik politician
- Frances L. Swift (1837-1916), church and temperance leader
- Daniel Martin Varisco (1951-) anthropologist, historian
- Kyle Veris (1983-) soccer player
- Matt Warburton television writer
- Aaron White (1992-) professional basketball player
- D. J. Woods (1989-) AFL football
