= Jelloway Creek =

Stream in Ohio, U.S.

Coordinates: 40°24′20″N 82°19′14″W

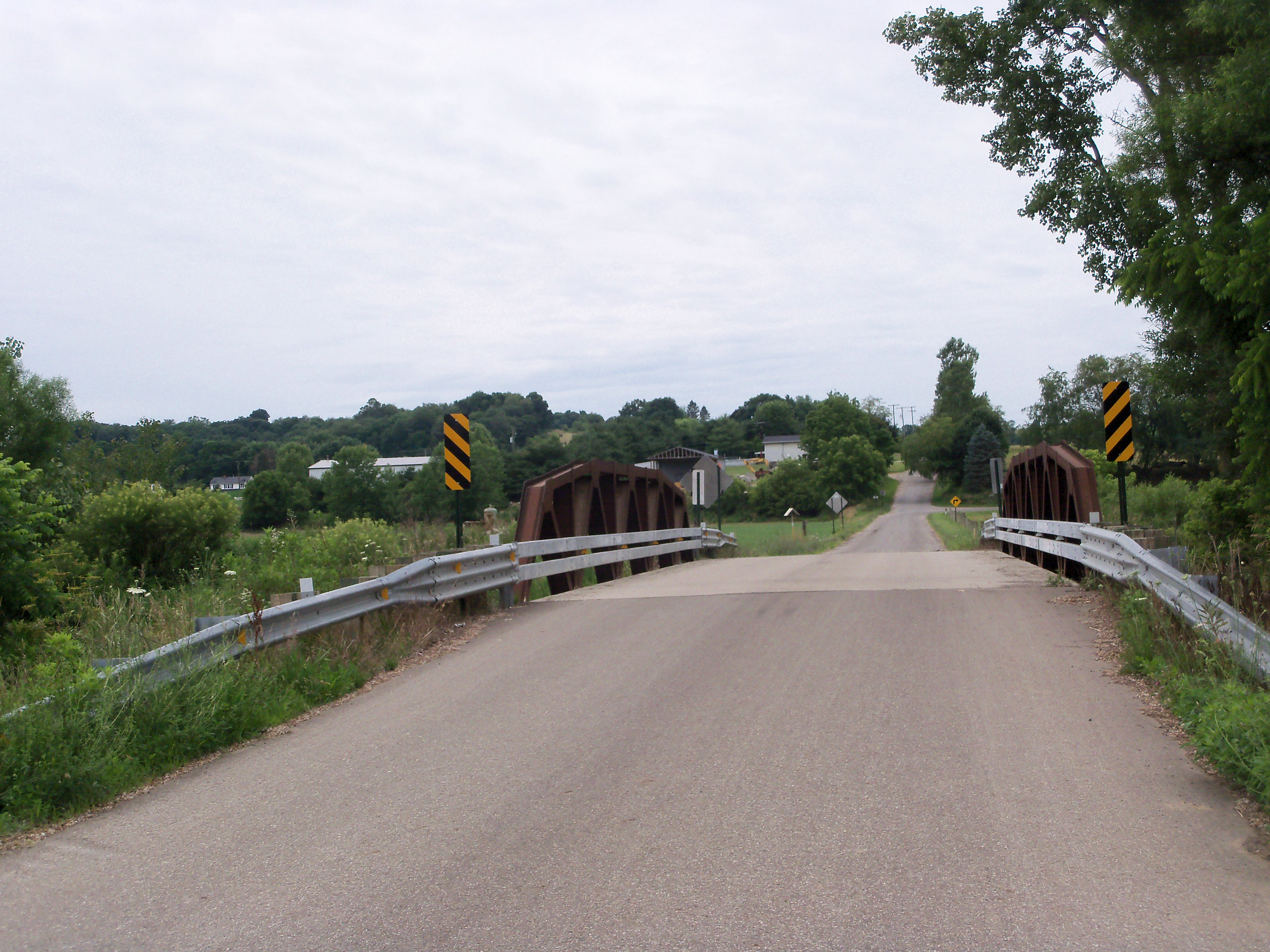
Bridge over the creek in northern Knox County

Jelloway Creek is a stream in the U.S. state of Ohio.

Jelloway Creek was named for Tom Jelloway, a Native American chief.

== See also ==
- List of rivers of Ohio
