= Aullwood House and Garden =

Historic house in Ohio, United States

- U.S. National Register of Historic Places
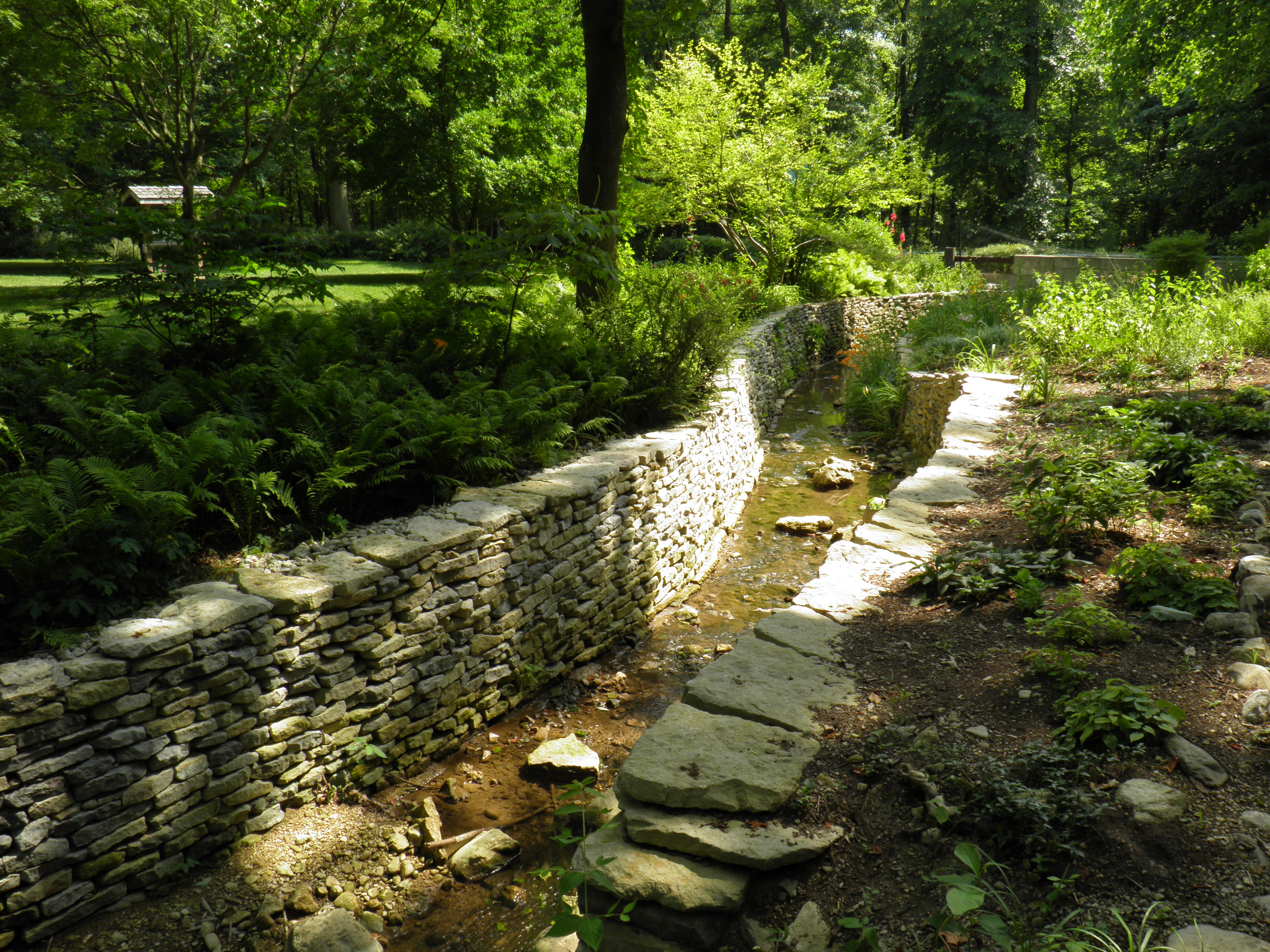
- A stream on the Aullwood House Grounds

- Location within Ohio Location within the United States
- Nearest city: Dayton, Ohio
- Coordinates: 39°52′5″N 84°16′32″W
- Architect: Marie Aull
- Architectural style: Craftsman
- NRHP reference No.: 99000092
- Added to NRHP: 1999-02-05

Aullwood House and Garden is a registered historic site near Dayton, Ohio, listed in the National Register on 1999-02-05.

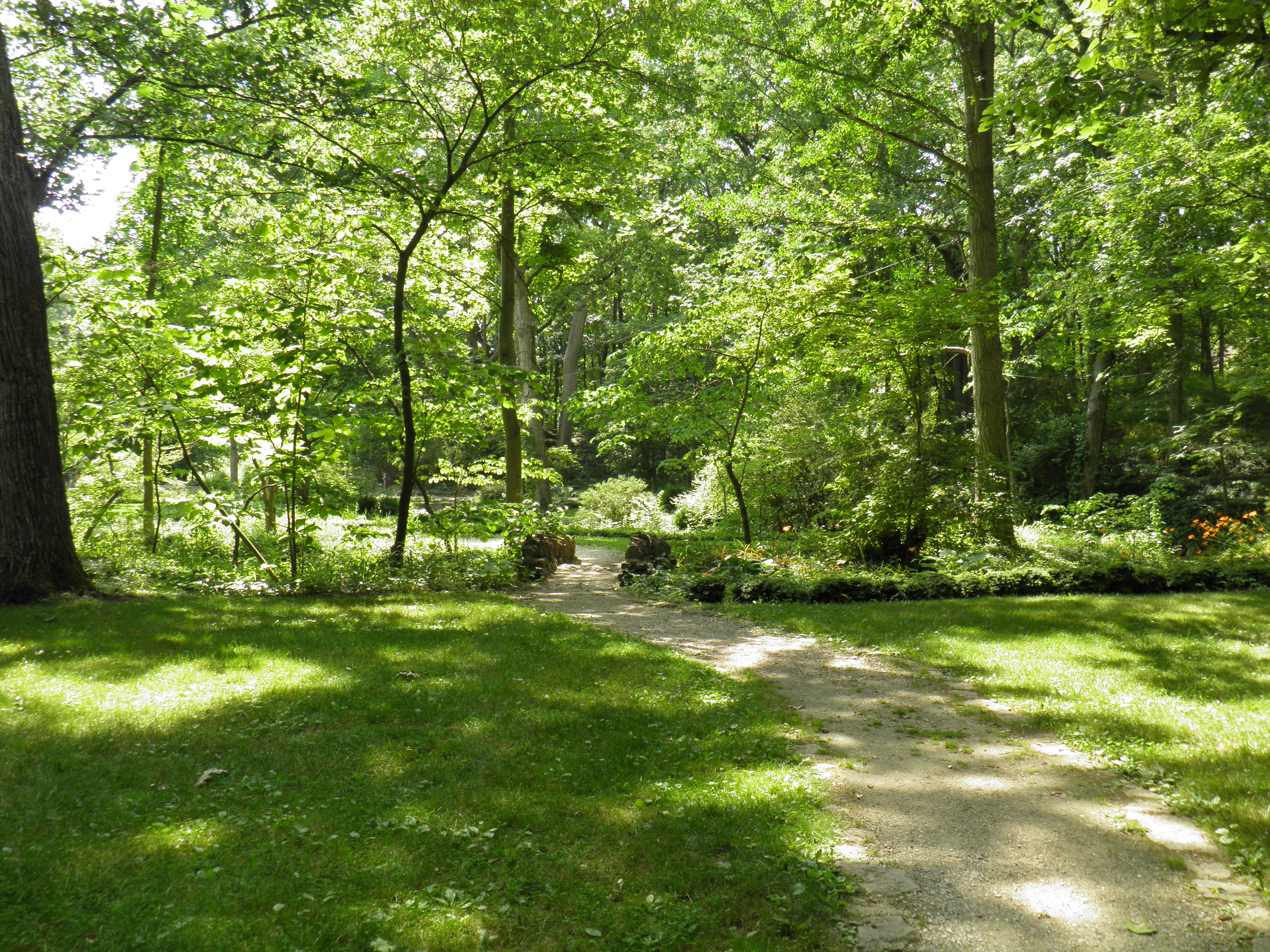
A path on the grounds in June, 2012.

The property once served as home for Dayton-area industrialist John Aull and his wife, Marie. The garden includes a mix of native and nonnative plants, and is home to many bird and butterfly species. Today, the garden is one of twenty-five properties cared for by Five Rivers MetroParks. There are guided tours of the 32-acre (13 ha) gardens.

== Marie Aull ==
Marie Sturwold Aull (1897-2002) is considered "the godmother of the Miami Valley environmental movement." Born in Cincinnati, Ohio, to a family of avid gardeners, she grew up with a passion for gardening and the environment. She went on to take botany, biology, and bird study courses at the University of Cincinnati.

She is credited for initiating the first National Audubon Society nature center in the Midwest when 70 acres of her property was gifted to the Audubon Society in 1957. When a neighboring farm was put up for sale, Marie purchased the property and the farm was converted into an educational farm. Marie continued to live in her home until the age of 104 while providing public access to the gardens.

Marie financially contributed to the purchase of public land for the Dayton park district. She would later donate her home and garden property to an organization that would become the Five Rivers MetroParks.
