= Schoepfle Garden =

Botanical garden and natural woodland in Birmingham, Ohio, United States

Coordinates: 41°19′42″N 82°21′00″W

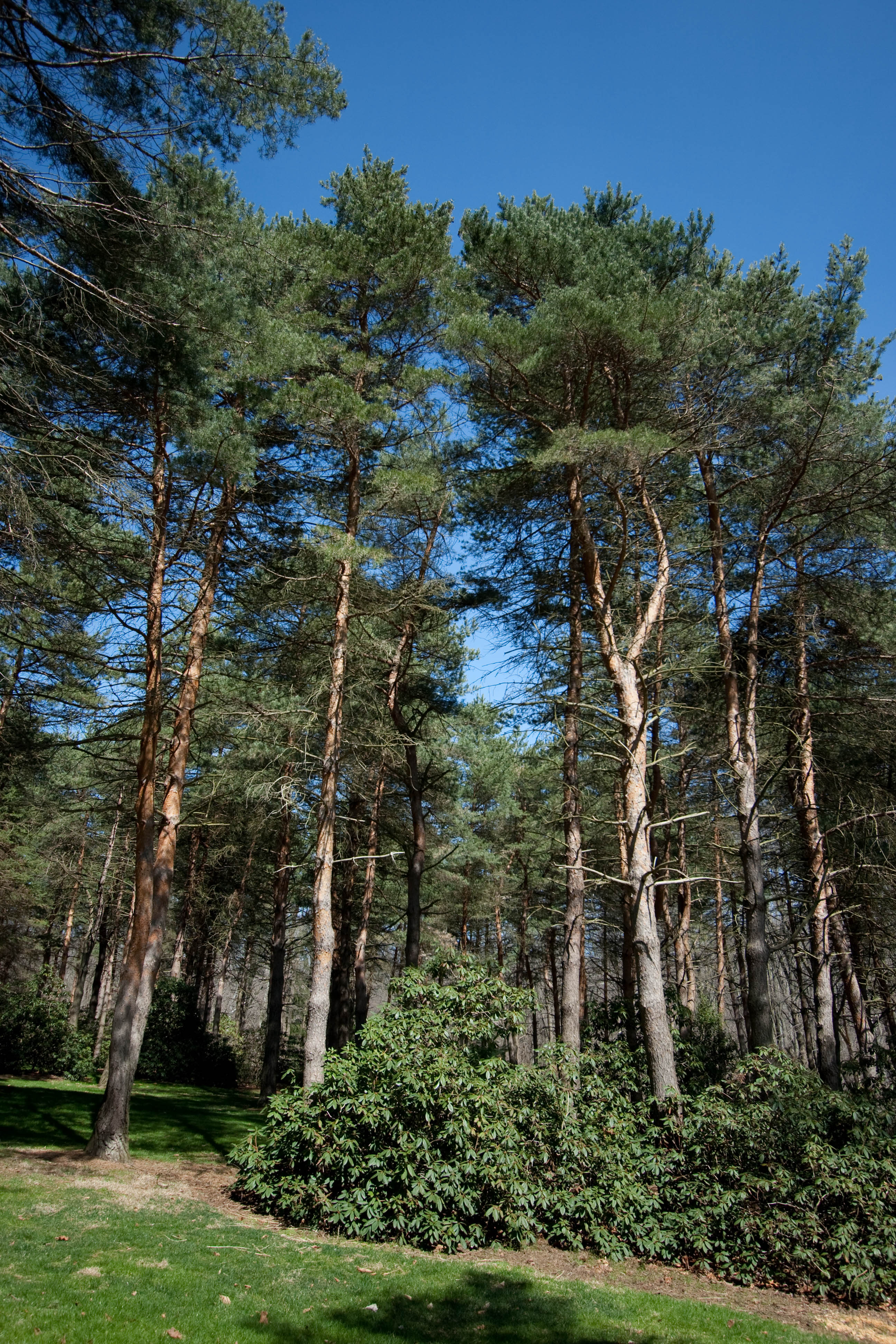
- Interactive map of Schoepfle Garden
- Area: 70 acres (28 ha)
- Website: Official website

Schoepfle Garden is a 70 acres (28 ha) botanical garden and natural woodland bordered by the Vermilion River (Ohio). The garden features collections of rhododendrons, roses, lilies, hostas, various shade plants, along with many varieties of shrubs, topiary and trees. There is a visitor center, and guided tours are available throughout the year. The garden is part of the Lorain County Metro Parks, and is located on Market Street in Birmingham, Erie County, Ohio.

== History ==
Schoepfle Garden was the ancestral home of the Schoepfle family, before being sold in 1924 and used as rental property. In 1936, Otto Schoepfle repurchased the house and land originally owned by his grandparents. Over the years, with help from local people, Otto developed the garden that can be seen today. Born in 1910, Otto Schoepfle did not start out to create a botanical garden. He in fact referred to it sometimes as “the garden that grew”. Over the years, he traveled Europe to study and learn about different botanical varieties, coming home after each trip with new ideas for plantings. This continual pursuit of learning became a dominant force in his philosophy of life.

In 1969, Otto donated the garden to Lorain County Metro Parks and continued to live in the house and look after it until his death in 1992.

== Layout ==
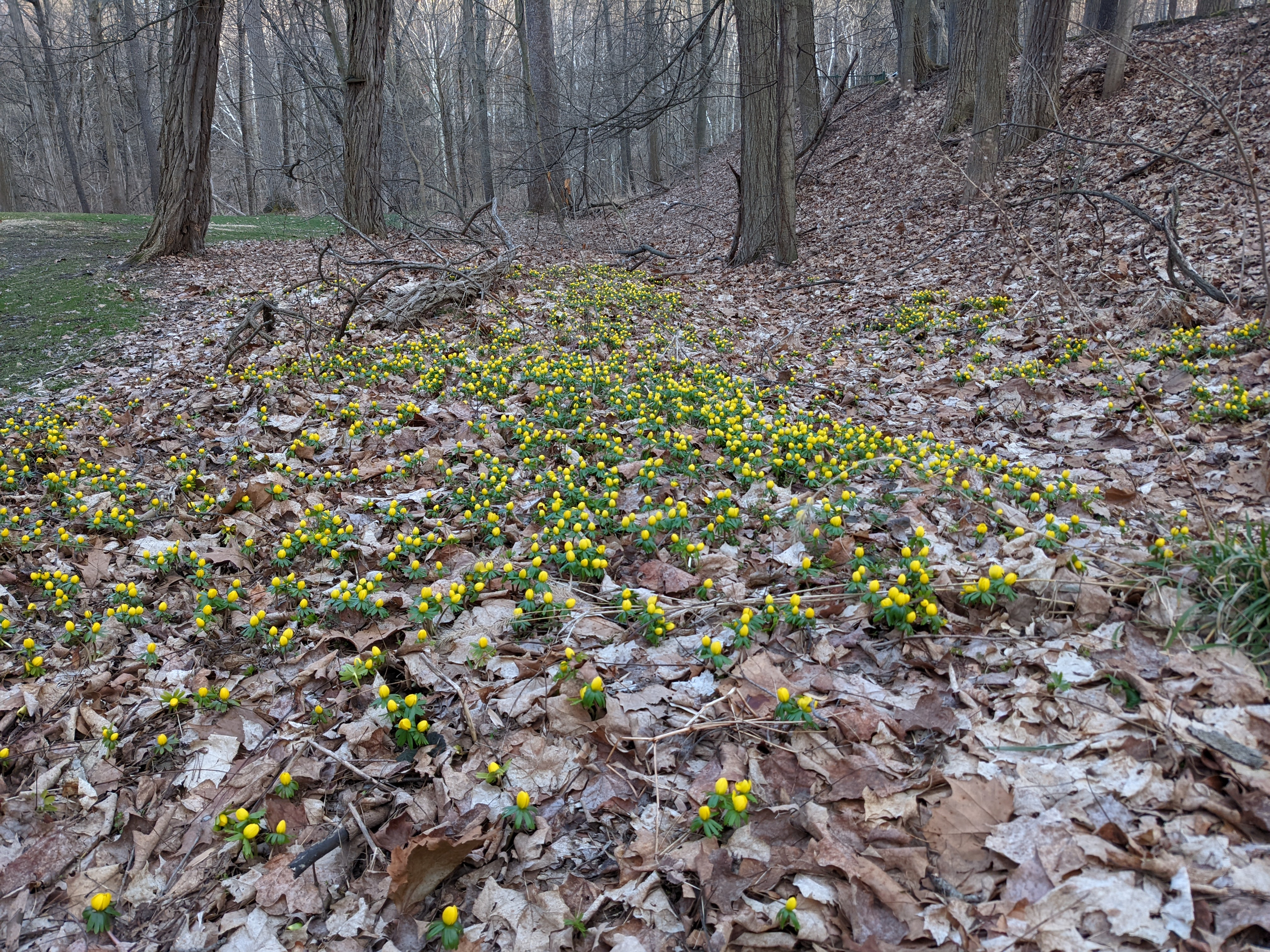
Winter aconite (Eranthis hyemalis)in the buttercup family (Ranunculaceae) at Schoepfle Garden, in Birmingham, Erie County, Ohio on March 10th, 2022

Schoepfle Garden is laid out in several sections, including the:

- "Formal garden", which contains a central path lined with hedges and topiaries and grassy side paths. Specimen trees in this garden include holly, ginkgo, European beech, Japanese Umbrella Pine, and Dawn Redwood.
- "Shade garden", which runs alongside the formal garden, and features a canopy of pines and two ponds. Species of shrubs and shade plants which line the floor include ferns, hostas, astilbes and rhododendrons.
- "Children's garden", a musically themed section that was added in 2007, and involved a community project of local businesses, landscapers and artists who donated, constructed the garden and restored carousel horses.

In addition to the formal and shade gardens, there are nearly fifty acres of natural woodlands that lie between the gardens and the Vermilion River. Hiking trails here include a 1-mile (1.6 km) and a 0.5-mile (0.80 km) loop, and a 0.6-mile (0.97 km) river trail.

== See also ==
- List of botanical gardens in the United States
