= Maple-Union Corners =

- U.S. National Register of Historic Places
- U.S. Historic district
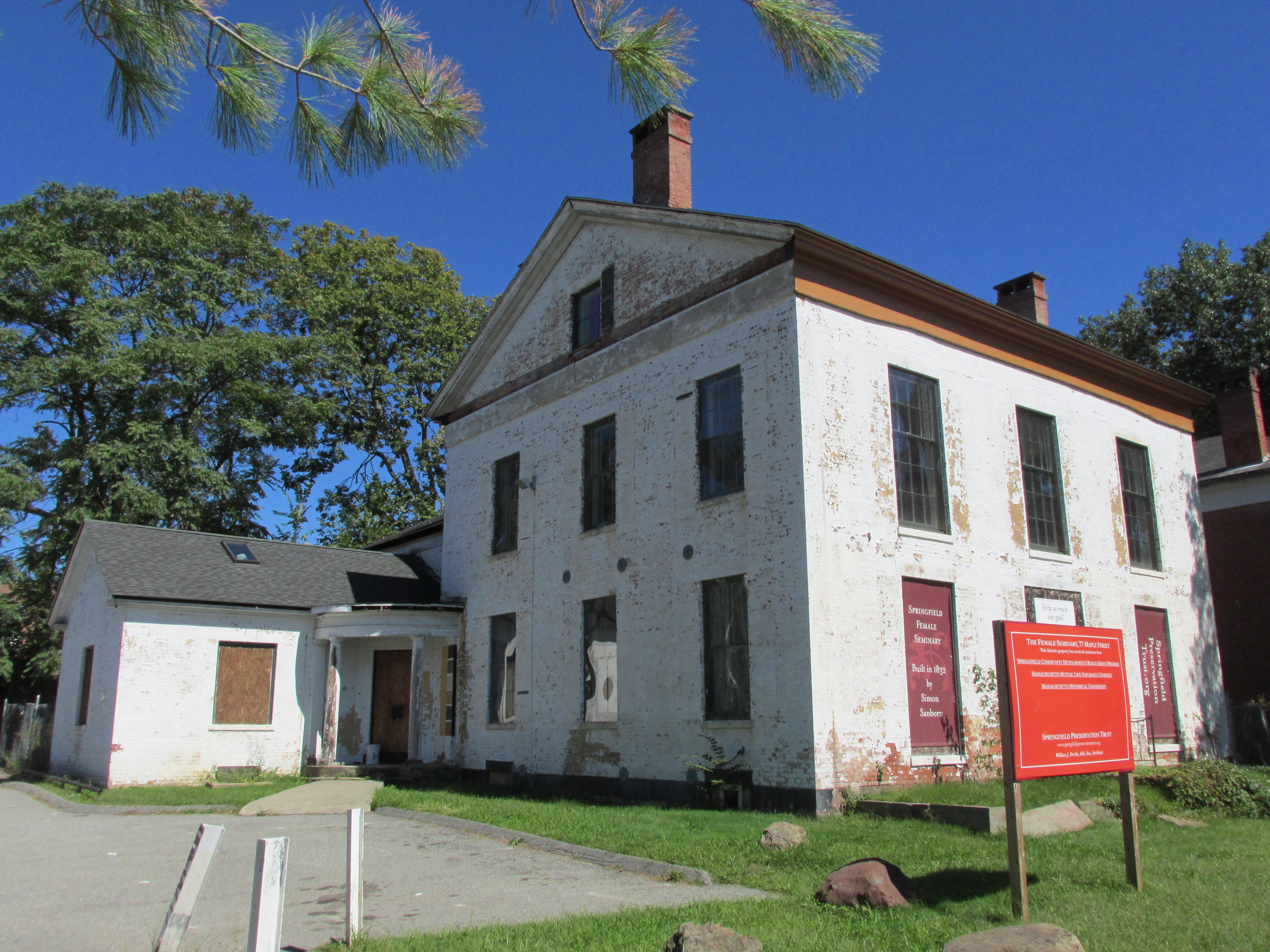
- The Female Seminary

- Location within Massachusetts Location within the United States
- Location: Maple and Union Sts., Springfield, Massachusetts
- Coordinates: 42°6′5″N 72°34′56″W
- Area: 1 acre (0.40 ha)
- Built: 1832
- Architect: Sanborn, Simon
- NRHP reference No.: 76000243
- Added to NRHP: April 26, 1976

Maple-Union Corners is a historic district centered at the intersection of Maple and Union Streets in Springfield, Massachusetts. The area is prominent as the location of the Springfield Female Seminary building (77 Maple Street, built 1832, now in residential use), and for the distinctive homes of several of Springfield's prominent 19th century citizens. The house at 83 Maple Street, was first owned by Solomon Merrick, inventor of the monkey wrench, and was later owned by Ansel Phelps, the fourth mayor of Springfield. Townhouses at 76-78 and 80-84 Maple Street comprise the rest of the district; owners or occupants included Francis Fuller, owner of the Fuller Block, and Edmund Chapin, president of the John Hancock National Bank. The district was listed on the National Register of Historic Places in 1976.

The cluster of buildings are located on the north and south sides of Maple Street, extending westward from its junction with Union Street. 83 Maple Street is at the corner on the north side; it was built in 1841, and is a fine example of Greek Revival architecture in brick, with a two-story columned portico across the front. The former seminary building stands just to its west; it is a two-story brick structure, with a three-bay facade and gabled roof. On the south side of Maple Street, 80-84 is a row of three brick townhouses, two stories in height, built in 1870. The two right ones are topped by a mansard roof, while that at the corner has a decorative parapet. Number 76-78 is a duplex with a mansard roof and a pyramidal tower at the right corner.

== See also ==
- National Register of Historic Places listings in Springfield, Massachusetts
- National Register of Historic Places listings in Hampden County, Massachusetts
