= Fellows Riverside Gardens =

Public botanical gardens in Youngstown, Ohio, United States

Coordinates: 41°05′57″N 80°40′30″W

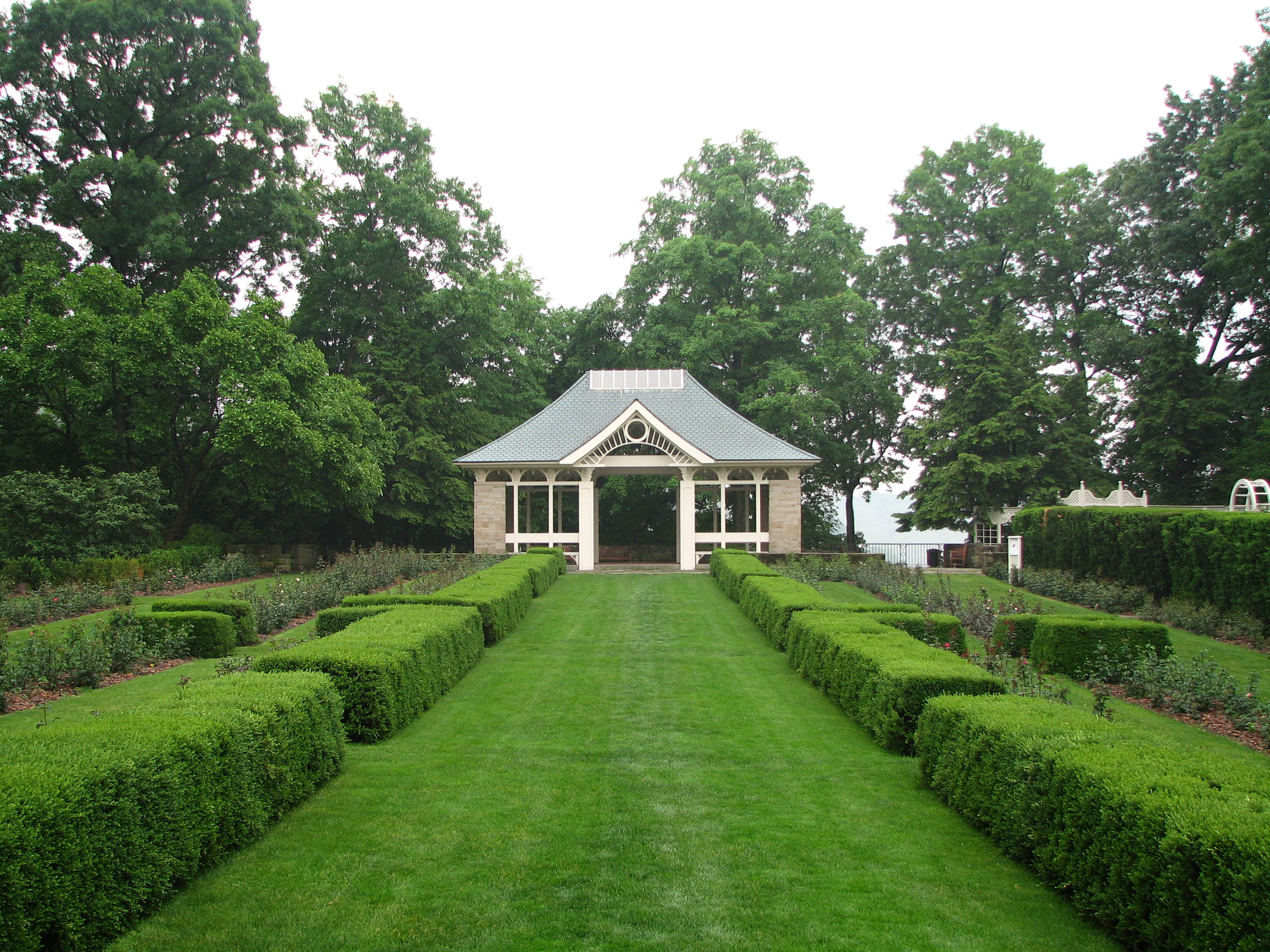
- Kidston Pavilion
- Interactive map of Fellows Riverside Gardens
- Website: Official website

Fellows Riverside Gardens (11 acres) are public botanical gardens, part of the Mill Creek Metro Parks system. The gardens are located at 123 McKinley Avenue, in Youngstown, Ohio, United States. They are open daily with no admission fee.

== History ==
In 1958, Elizabeth A. Fellows bequeathed the property to Mill Creek Park, together with funds to create a public garden on the site. She died in 1958 at the age of 96 in her home. In 1962, plans of how the garden would be designed came to fruition by Landscape Architect John L. Paolano. In order to keep the authenticity of the land, he maintained the overlooks and natural rolling landscape. After the design was completed, the first plantings began in 1963.

== Facilities ==
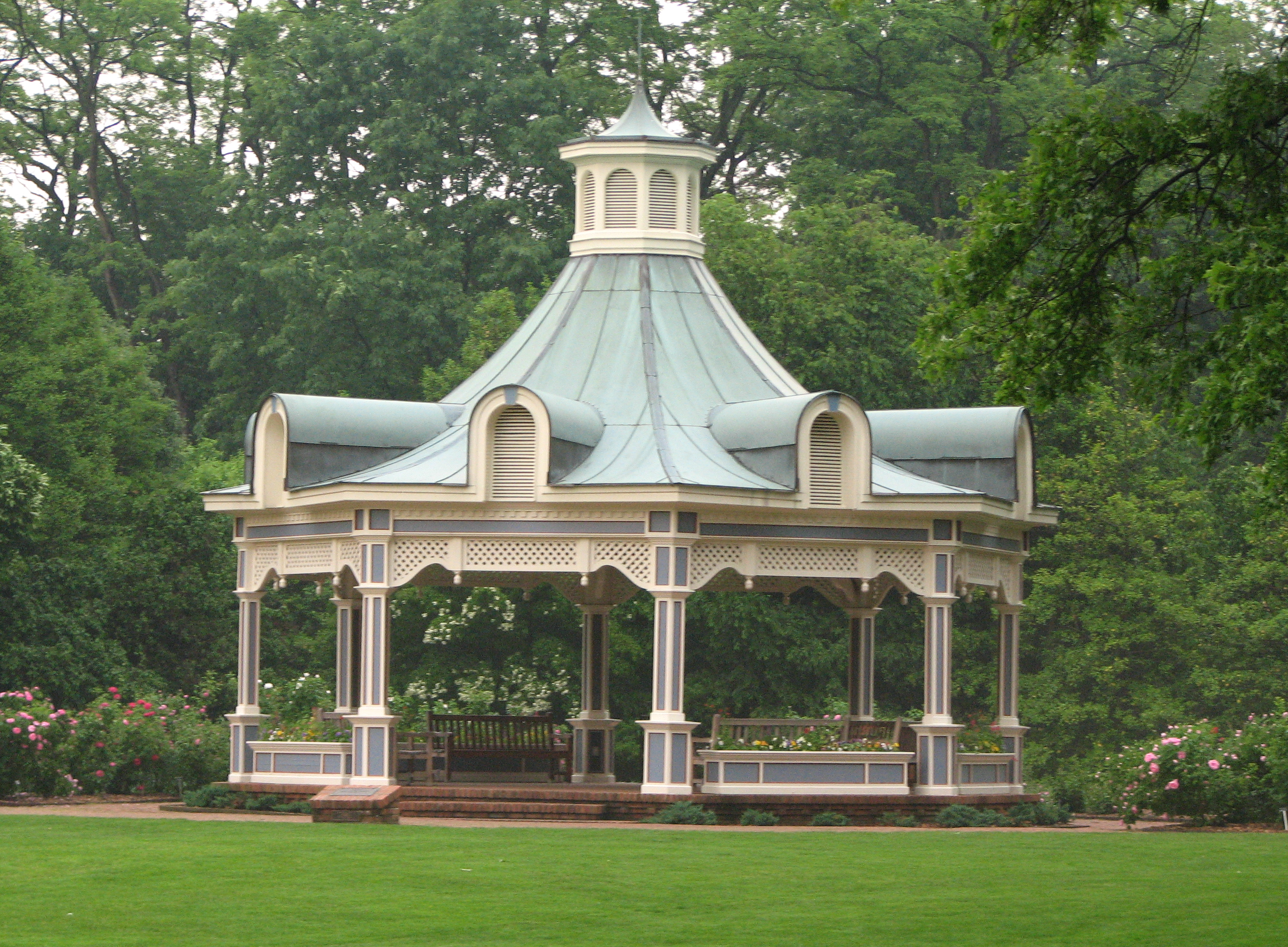
Victorian gazebo

Today the gardens include labeled flower displays of annuals, chrysanthemums, perennials, and tulips, with over 40,000 bulbs blooming each spring. The rose collection includes a formal rose garden with hybrid tea, floribunda and grandiflora roses, as well as climbing roses along a perennial border walk. Botanical and shrub roses are represented throughout the site. The gardens also contain a variety of labeled trees and woody shrubs, with collections of European beech, dwarf conifers, hollies, and rhododendrons, as well as an observation tower with a fine view of Lake Glacier.

The D.D. and Velma Davis Visitor & Education Center located at the Gardens houses a horticultural library, a Garden Cafe by Kravitz Deli, classrooms, a gift shop and meeting rooms. Many cultural events take place there each year and classes in horticulture, art and culture are offered year-round. The Visitor Center also contains a museum and an art gallery which features nature- and horticulture-themed shows. National and international speakers are hosted at the center as well.

Two other structures, the Gazebo and the Kidston Pavilion, are often the site of weddings, programs, and classes.

== Events ==
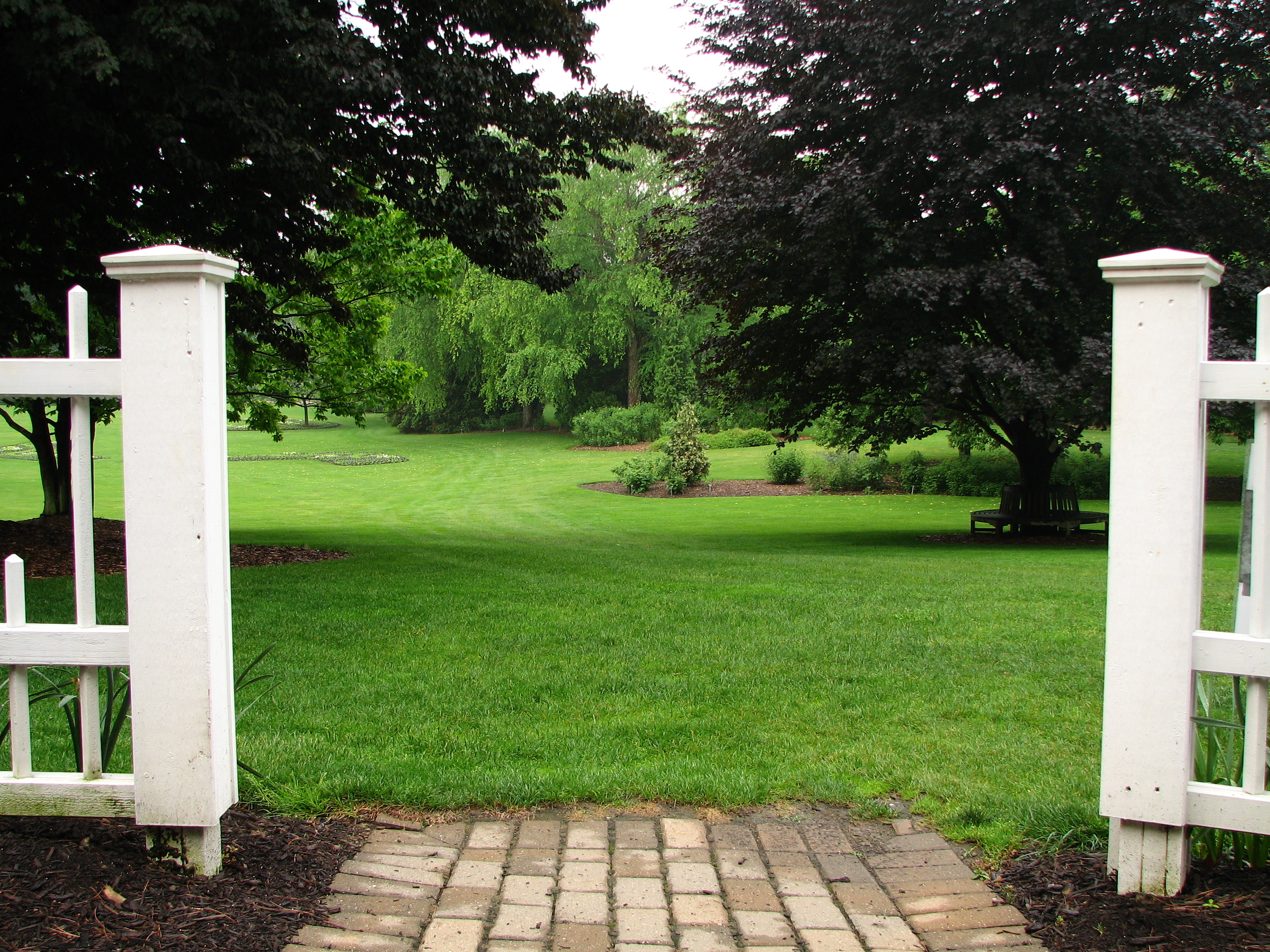
A variety of events are held each year in the gardens.

The garden is the site of an All-America Selections Roses demonstration garden where new rose varieties are tested before being released to the public, a trial garden for new releases of annuals and perennials and a dahlia trial garden where showy dahlia varieties are tested. The dahlia trial garden is sponsored by the American Dahlia Society.

Children can interact with gardening and take classes in the Family Garden. Some classes and events require a fee.

Several annual events, such as Pumpkin Walk at Twilight, an autumn exhibit of carved and lighted jack-o-lanterns, Winter Nights, a winter display of luminary, and numerous flower shows are hosted at the gardens.

Fellows Riverside Gardens celebrated its 50th anniversary in 2008 with a variety of special events.

== Gallery ==
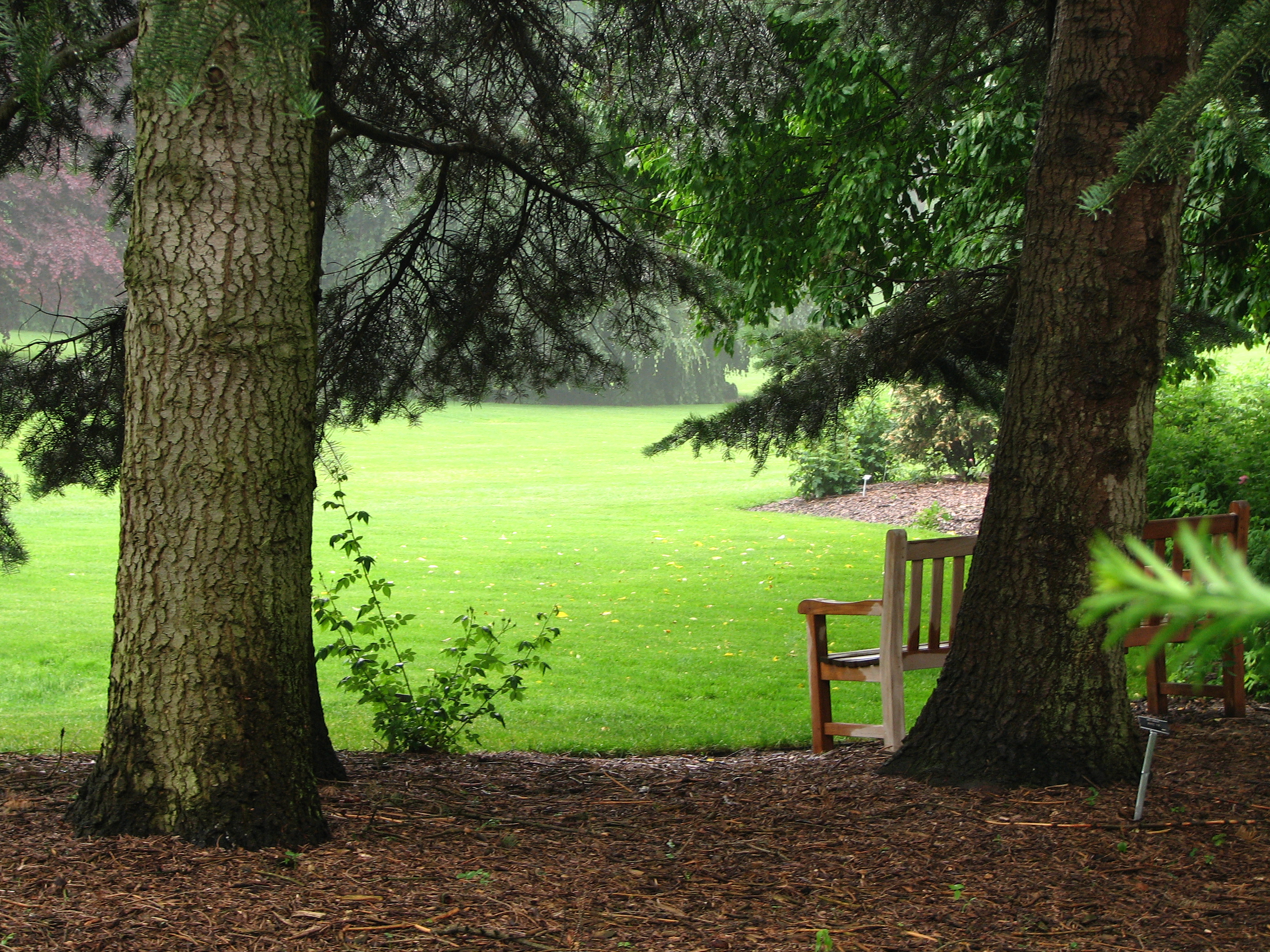

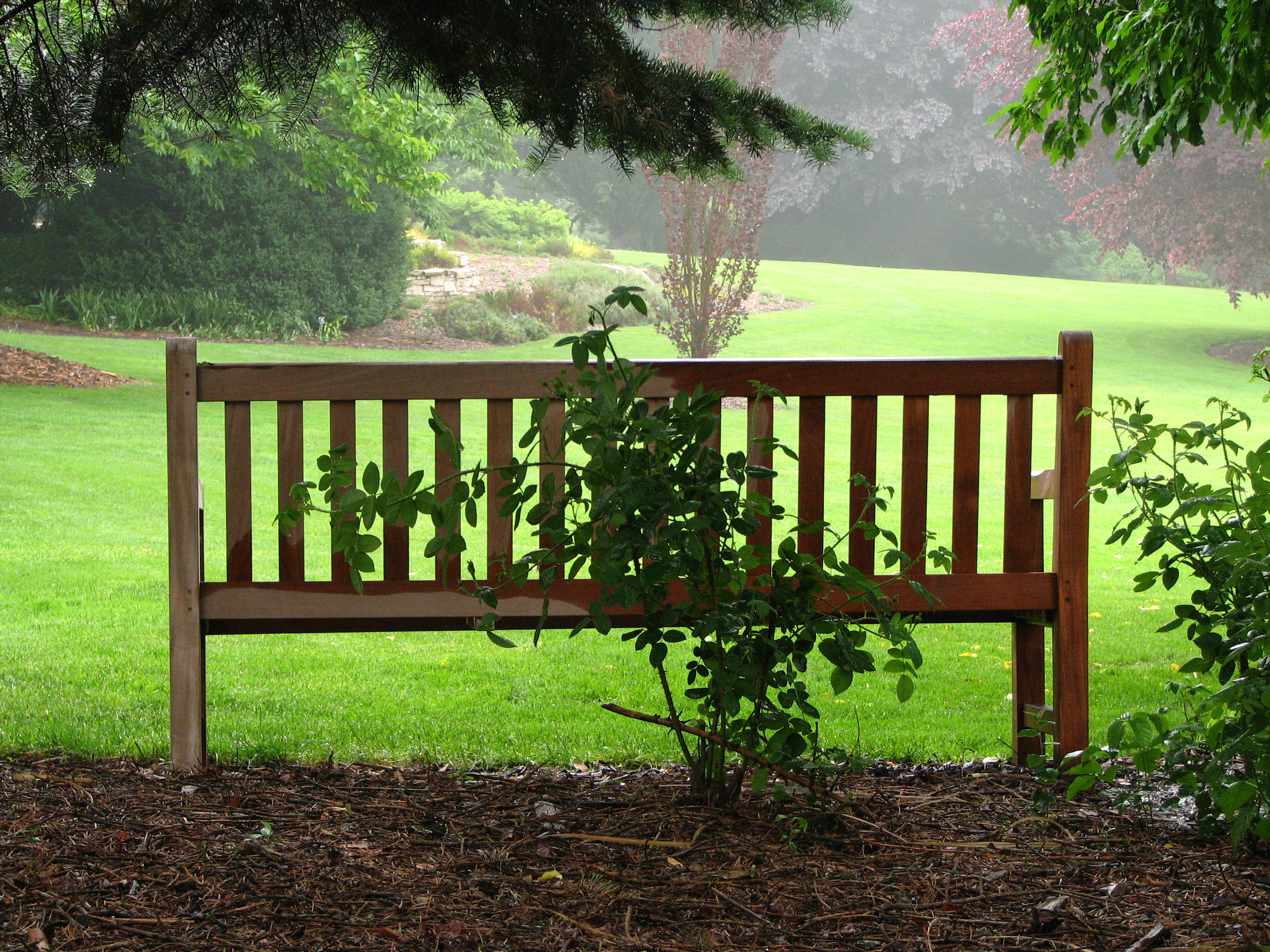

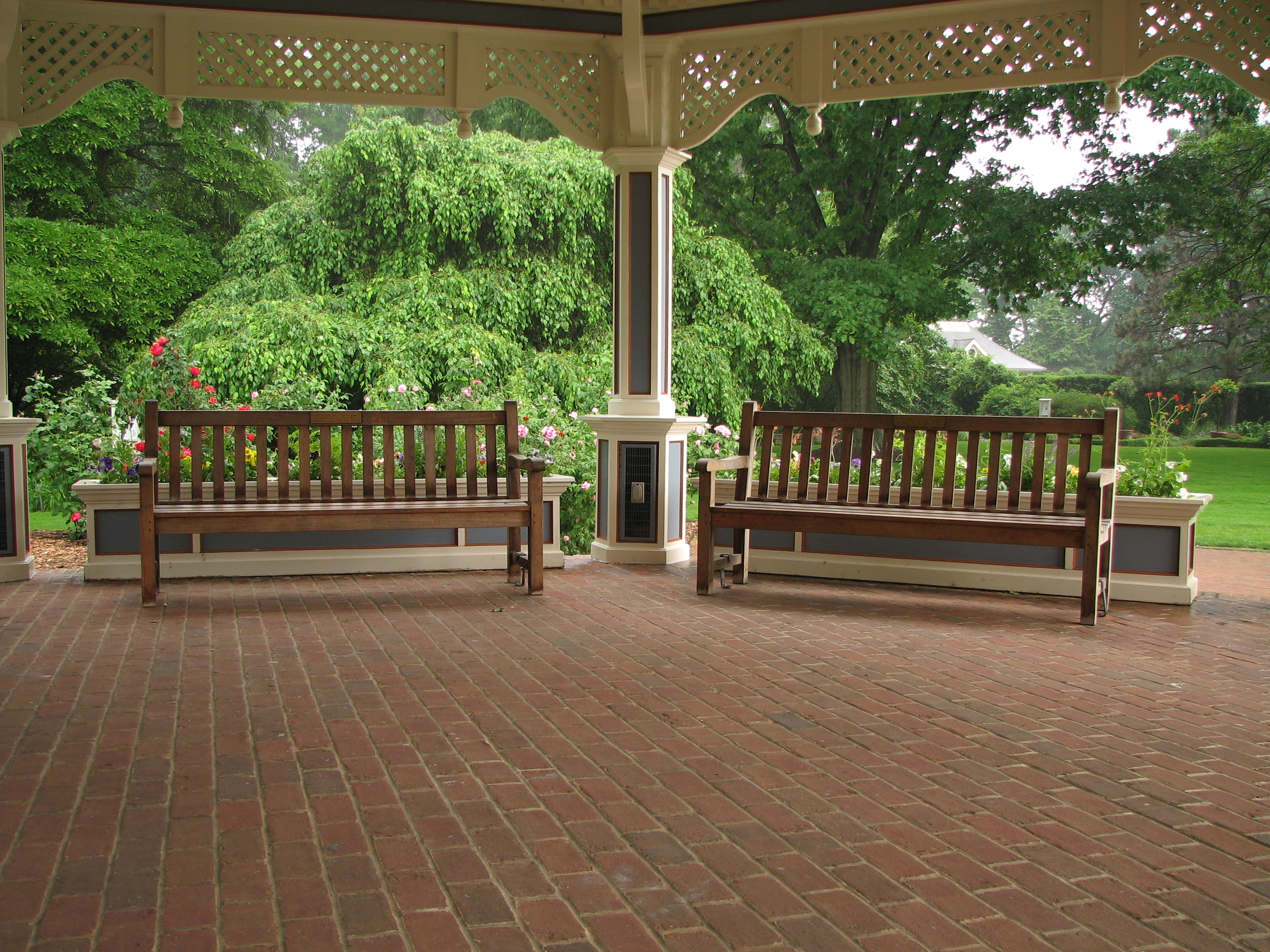
Inside the Victorian gazebo

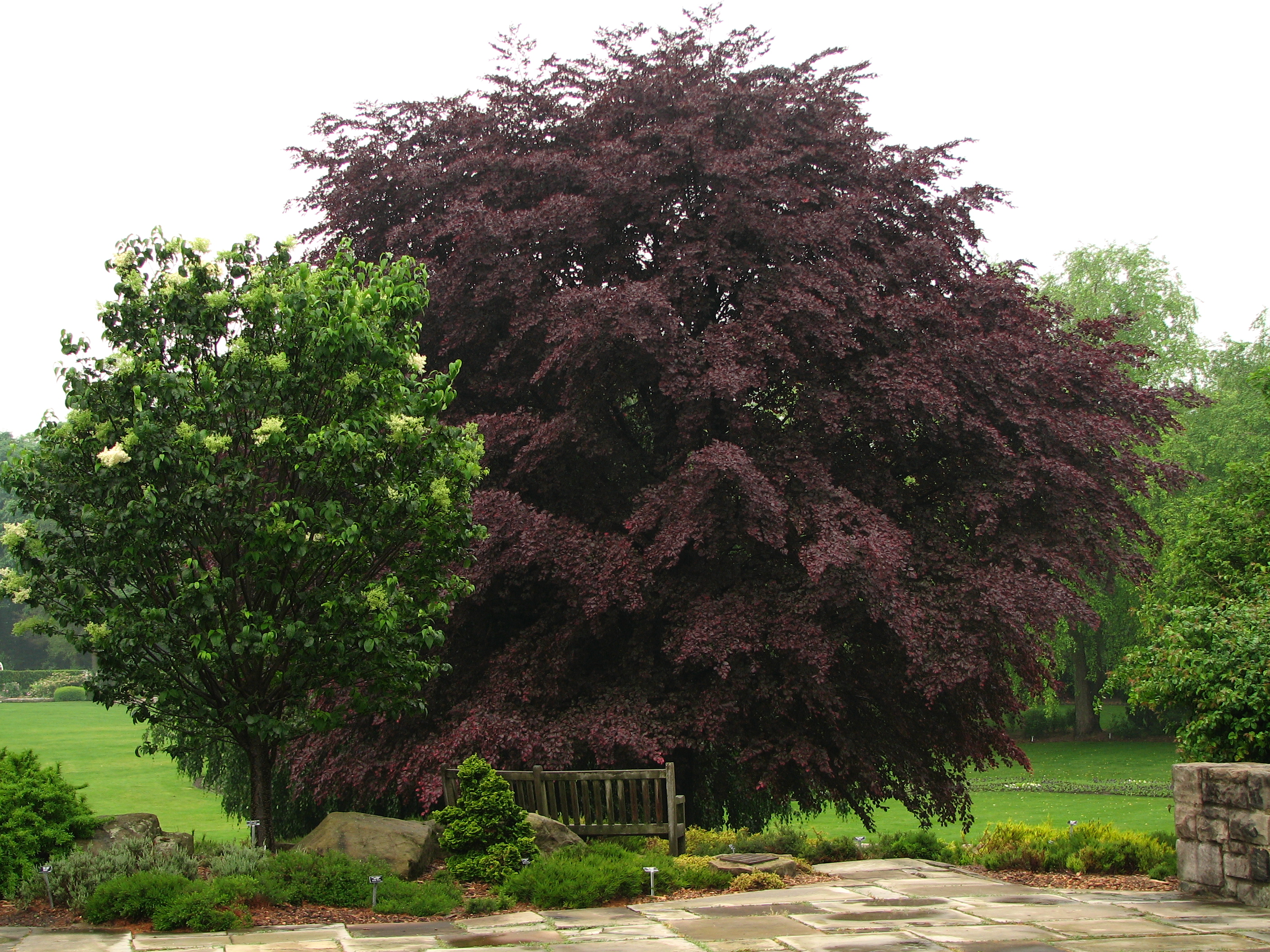

== See also ==
- List of botanical gardens in the United States
