= R. A. Stranahan Arboretum =

Arboretum in Toledo, Ohio, United States

Coordinates: 41°41′35″N 83°40′17″W

- Interactive map of R. A. Stranahan Arboretum
- Area: 47 acres (19 ha)
- Website: Official website

The R. A. Stranahan Arboretum covers 47 acres (19 ha), and is located at 4131 Tantara Drive, Toledo, Ohio, about a 10-minute drive from the main campus of the University of Toledo. It contains 1,500 specimens of cultivated, mature trees from China, Serbia, Japan, and Norway, as well as North American varieties ranging from Bristlecone Pine to Buckeye.

The Arboretum site includes cultivated ornamental trees, rolling lawns, natural woods, ponds, wetlands, and a restored prairie, all located within the "Oak Openings" sand dune region. About one-quarter of the Arboretum is covered by forest. The older forest has not been cleared for over 150 years and has oaks as the dominant tree, with the peaks of old sand dunes visible beneath its undergrowth. The newer forest is 50 years old, with red maple as the dominant tree.

The Arboretum was donated to the University of Toledo in 1964 by the W. W. Knight family, in memory of Robert Stranahan.

== See also ==
- List of botanical gardens in the United States
