= Ohio bioscience sector =

Significant economic sector in the state

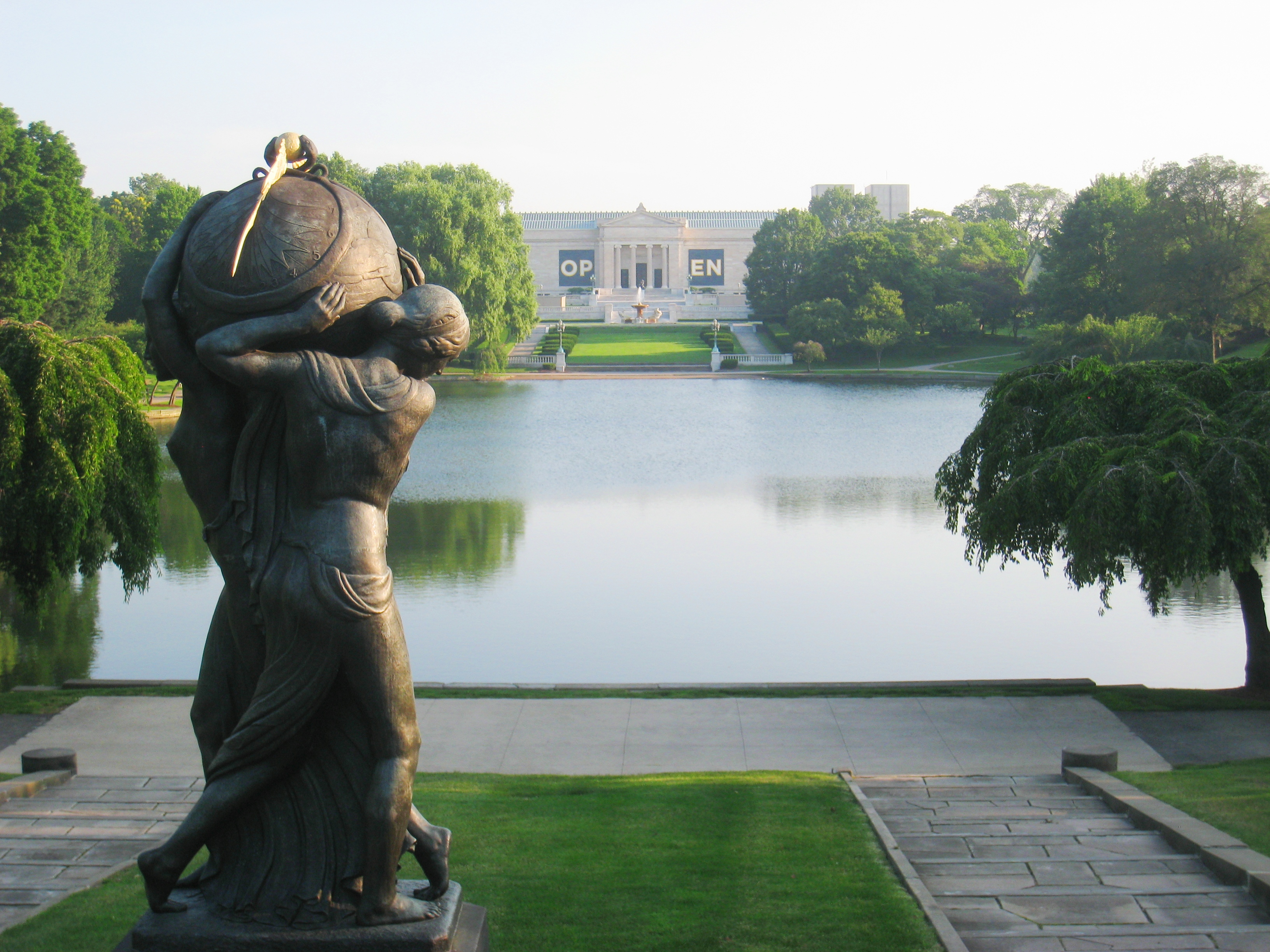
Wade Lagoon in University Circle, home to the Case Medical Center and neighboring Cleveland Clinic, which is set to begin human clinical trials of their breast cancer vaccine in 2011. Netherlands-based Philips Healthcare is constructing a medical imaging research and development center in the neighborhood, referred to as the Cleveland Health-Tech Corridor.

The Ohio bioscience sector strength was ranked #4 among USA states in 2008 by Business Facilities magazine.

== Overview ==
As of 2008, there were over 1,100 biotech related firms operating in the state, employing 1.4 million residents overall in direct or indirect related fields, including healthcare, with $2.5 billion in investment in 2007, making it an international leader. Ohio had three city-regions in the top 30 biotech locations in the country, with Cleveland-Akron ranked #20, Columbus #22, and Cincinnati #28.

The overall economic impact of the bioscience industry in Ohio, including healthcare, amounted to $148.2 billion in 2007, representing 15.7% of Ohio's economic output. Half of the biotech industry is located in northeast Ohio, with 574 firms, while central and southern Ohio are home to around 200 each. 635 companies are FDA-certified to manufacture medical devices. Biotech research and development employs directly 12,415 residents, while agricultural bioscience contributed the largest economic impact, at $10.7 billion. Medical device manufacturers employ 9,757 residents.

=== General firms ===
Major firms include Meridian Bioscience in Cincinnati, which has been ranked by Fortune and Business Week as one of the top small businesses in the country; Atricure in West Chester, Ganeden Biotech in Cleveland, Cleveland Medical Devices and Orbital Research in Cleveland, Stolle Milk Biologics in Cincinnati, Germany-based BASF in Whitehouse, Imalux Corporation in Cleveland, ZIN Medical in Cleveland, Theken Surgical in Akron, Ohio, Philips Medical Systems in Highland Heights, Charles River Labs in Spencerville, Freedom Meditech in Toledo, Traycer Diagnostic Systems in Columbus, Idexx Laboratories in Boardman, Ben Venue Laboratories, a division of Germany-based Boehringer Ingelheim, in Bedford, Ethicon Endo-Surgery, a subsidiary of Johnson & Johnson, located in Blue Ash, STERIS Corporation in Mentor, Chemical Abstracts Service in Columbus, Invacare in Elyria, Diagnostic Hybrids in Athens, and Synapse Biomedical in Oberlin.

In 2010, France-based Areva began a partnership with the University of Cincinnati to develop treatments for cancer using nuclear techniques, while the Third Frontier program attracted Colorado-based Lanx Inc.'s Lumbar Motion Monitor Commercialization project, working in collaboration with the Ohio State University and Cleveland Clinic Center for Spine Health.

Capital venture firms focused on biosciences include Charter Life Sciences in Cincinnati, Primus Venture Partners in Cleveland, Reservoir Venture Partners in Columbus, River Cities Capital Funds in Cincinnati, Draper Triangle Ventures in Cleveland, Ohio Innovation in Cleveland, CID Equity Partners in Columbus, Triathlon Medical Ventures in Cincinnati, and Oakwood Medical Investors in Cleveland, while JumpStart, based in Cleveland, provides funding for related ventures.

Major biotech incubators include BioEnterprise in Cleveland, BIOSTART in Cincinnati, TechColumbus, and the Innovation Center in Athens.

In October 2010, Austen BioInnovation Institute in Akron was cleared to begin a renovation project for their new headquarters, projected to produce 2400 new employment positions in the next decade.

=== Biopharmaceutical ===
Biopharmaceutical companies in Ohio employ 91,750 people in Ohio, with 15,992 directly related jobs, and 75,758 indirectly related positions. In 2006, wages from the sector totaled $1.2 billion, with an economic output of $14.9 billion. 15.8% of clinical trials for new medicines focused on important conditions were conducted in the state in 2008, while companies invested $688 million in research and development.

Major firms include Procter & Gamble, headquartered in Cincinnati, Roxane Laboratories, a division of Boehringer Ingelheim, located in Columbus, Forest Pharmaceuticals, a subsidiary of Forest Laboratories, located in Cincinnati, Patheon in Cincinnati, Amylin Pharmaceuticals in West Chester, Auburn Pharmaceuticals in Cleveland, a Sigma-Aldrich facility in Miamisburg, Reese Pharmaceutical in Cleveland, AcelleRX Therapeutics in Cleveland, Akebia Therapeutics in Cincinnati, Kendle International in Cincinnati, Bayer in Newark, Ross Laboratories, a division of Abbott Laboratories, in Columbus, Barr Pharmaceuticals in Cincinnati, and Cardinal Health in Dublin. In total, there are 88 FDA-certified companies in Ohio manufacturing pharmaceuticals.

In June 2010, the state's biotechnology development organization, BioOhio, announced a partnership with the Beijing Pharma and Biotech Center to develop business interests in the state and in China.

Ohio is home to pharmacy chains including Revco in Twinsburg and Discount Drug Mart in Medina, and previously Phar-Mor, which was headquartered in Youngstown.

=== Regenerative medicine ===
Cleveland has become recognized as a regenerative medicine research hub, due in part to the location of major research facilities in the city such as the National Center for Regenerative Medicine, Center for Stem Cell and Regenerative Medicine, Clinical Tissue Engineering Center, and the Cleveland Clinic, as well as its 30-year history of the research.

In 1986, scientists from the Case Western University filed patents related to mesenchymal stem cells, creating the foundation internationally for this sector in cellular therapeutics. The first clinical trials in the United States involving mesenchymal stem cells occurred between 1996 and 2000 at the University Hospitals of Cleveland, while the hospital was also responsible for the first adult umbilical cord transplant in 1997, and the first adult stem-cell clinical trials in the country in 2003.

Major regenerative medicine firms located in Cleveland include Osiris Therapeutics, started in 1994, Juventas Therapeutics, which has plans for their first clinical trial in 2010 and has raised $9.1 million in venture capital and grants, Cell Targeting Inc., which has raised $1 million in grants, Invenio Therapeutics Inc., which specializes in leukemia treatments, and Athersys Inc., which has developed the product Multistem, conducted 2 clinical trials, and raised $180 million in venture capital and grants. Other firms include Proxy Biomedical, LucCell, Inc., and the Cleveland Cord Blood Center.

An up-and-coming firm, Arteriocyte Inc., has completed one clinical trial and raised $43 million in venture capital and grants while being named as the top biotech startup in 2010 by the Ohio Venture Association. The same year the company announced completion of an R&D project funded by the U.S. Department of Defense through DARPA for the development of artificial blood to be used for combat situations.

Firms and institutions around the state include Center for Tissue Regeneration and Engineering at Dayton, Hi-Genomics in Toledo, BioDontos in Dublin, The Research Institute at Nationwide Children's Hospital in Columbus, SecuraCell in Canton, Stembanc, Inc. in Chardon, and Ethicord in Strongsville.
