= Research and development in Ohio =

Ohio in the United States is a major research and development center, home to many institutions.

== Overview ==
In 2008, institutions and companies in the state won 10 R&D 100 Awards, given annually to the top 100 innovations recognized by R&D Magazine, finishing second behind California. Ohio State University is among the country's top public research institutions at #7. Ohio is ranked in the top eight for states conducting clinical trials, including conducting the most clinical trials per capita.

In 2006, the state had a high-tech payroll of $9.8 billion, with 155,174 high-tech employees at 10,756 high tech locations. In 2005, industry in Ohio spent $5.9 billion on research and development, with colleges spending $1.5 billion, but by 2009, $8.2 billion in R&D contracts were identified, ranking 13th nationally. Ohio receives around $2.7 billion annually in federal R&D funds, ranking #9.

In 2005, it was ranked #4 in the country in industrial R&D activities, while the University of Dayton and Ohio State University ranked #2 and #3 nationally in total materials research. Ohio leads the nation in plastics and rubber research.

On July 30, 2010, the state approved a $3.5 million grant to convert the old NCR headquarters in Dayton into a collaborative innovation center. The Miami Valley Research Park in southwestern Ohio is a 1,250 acre complex home to the headquarters of Woolpert, Inc. as well as ATX, WilmerHale, and Center for Tissue, Innovation and Research facilities. A fun note, in 2010 automotive racing star Jeff Gordon and his company, in partnership with Arshot Investment Corp., named their new research and development project in Columbus the "Center for Automotive Research & Technology at Cooper Park."

=== Government and non-profit ===
Government-operated and non-profit research and development institutions include:

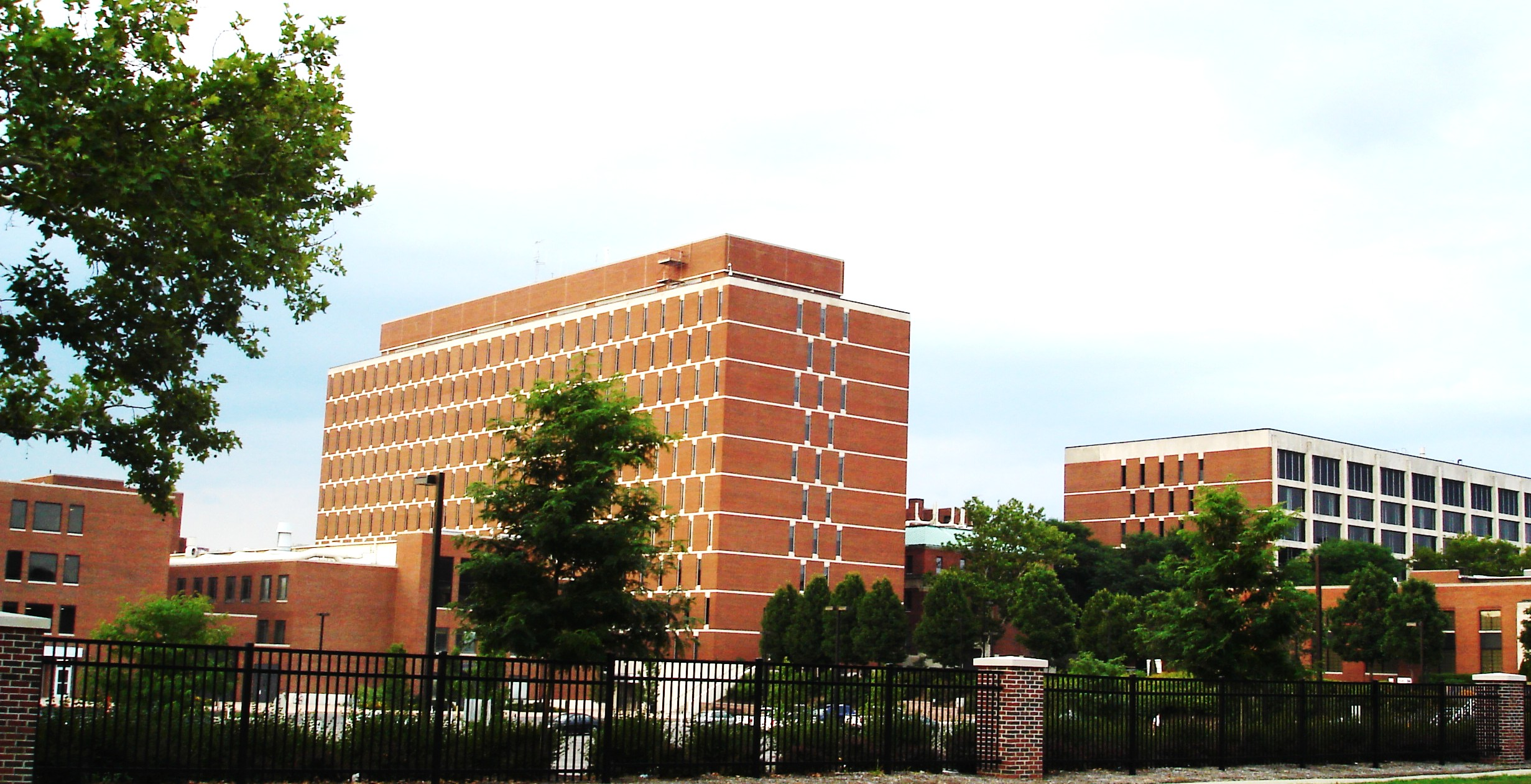
The Battelle Memorial Institute headquarters in Columbus. The institute is the world's largest private contract research and development organization, responsible for innovations such as photo-copying, leading to the creation of Xerox, the first nuclear fuel rods for nuclear reactors, the first optical digital recorder, the development of the Universal Product Code, and cruise control for automobiles. They have won 217 prestigious R&D 100 Awards.

- University of Dayton Research Institute
- Battelle Memorial Institute
- Cleveland Clinic
- Air Force Research Laboratory
- National Center for Regenerative Medicine
- Neurological Institute at Miami Valley Hospital
- Center for Stem Cell and Regenerative Medicine
- Center for Tissue Regeneration and Engineering at Dayton
- Clinical Tissue Engineering Center
- NASA Glenn Research Center
- FDA Forensic Chemistry Center
- a unit of the Army Research Laboratory
- UES, Inc
- Naval Health Research Center Detachment Environmental Health Effects Laboratory
- Environmental Protection Agency centers include a division of the National Exposure Research Laboratory, National Risk Management Research Laboratory, Breidenbach Environmental Research Center, Test and Evaluation Facility, Center Hill Facility, Experimental Stream Facility, Kerr Environmental Research Center, a unit of the National Center for Environmental Assessment
- U.S. Department of Health and Human Services centers include divisions for Biomedical and Behavioral Sciences, Physical Sciences and Engineering, Education and Information, Surveillance, Hazards Evaluations, and Field Studies
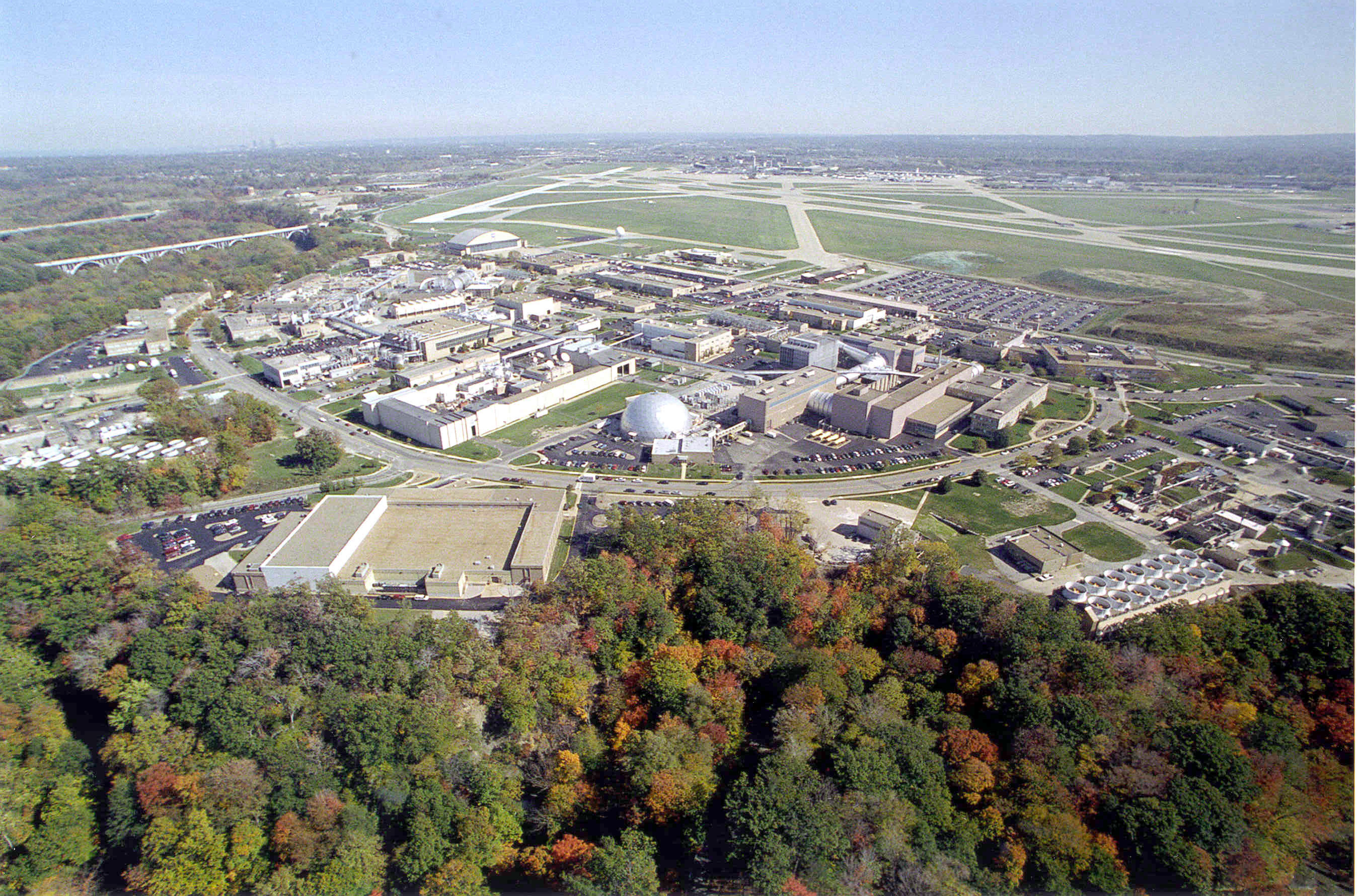
  The NASA Glenn Research Center in Cleveland. The center is responsible for the development of the liquid hydrogen rocket engine, the gridded Ion thruster, and the Centaur upper stage rocket.
- U.S. Department of Veterans Affairs centers include Stokes Cleveland Medical Center, Cincinnati Medical Center, and the Dayton VA Medical Center.
- U.S. Department of Agriculture centers include Soil Drainage Research Unit, North Appalachian Experimental Watershed Research Unit, Delaware Forestry Sciences Laboratory, and ARS Research Facility
- U.S. Department of Transportation's Vehicle Research and Test Center
- U.S. Department of the Interior's Columbus Field Research Station
- Ohio Coal Research Consortium
- Ohio Aerospace Institute
- Genome Research Institute
- Center for Computational Medicine
- Wright Center of Innovation
- Fuel Cell Prototyping Center
- Ohio Agricultural Research and Development Center
- Ohio Center for Advanced Propulsion and Power

=== Private ===
Private institutions in Ohio conducting research and development include:

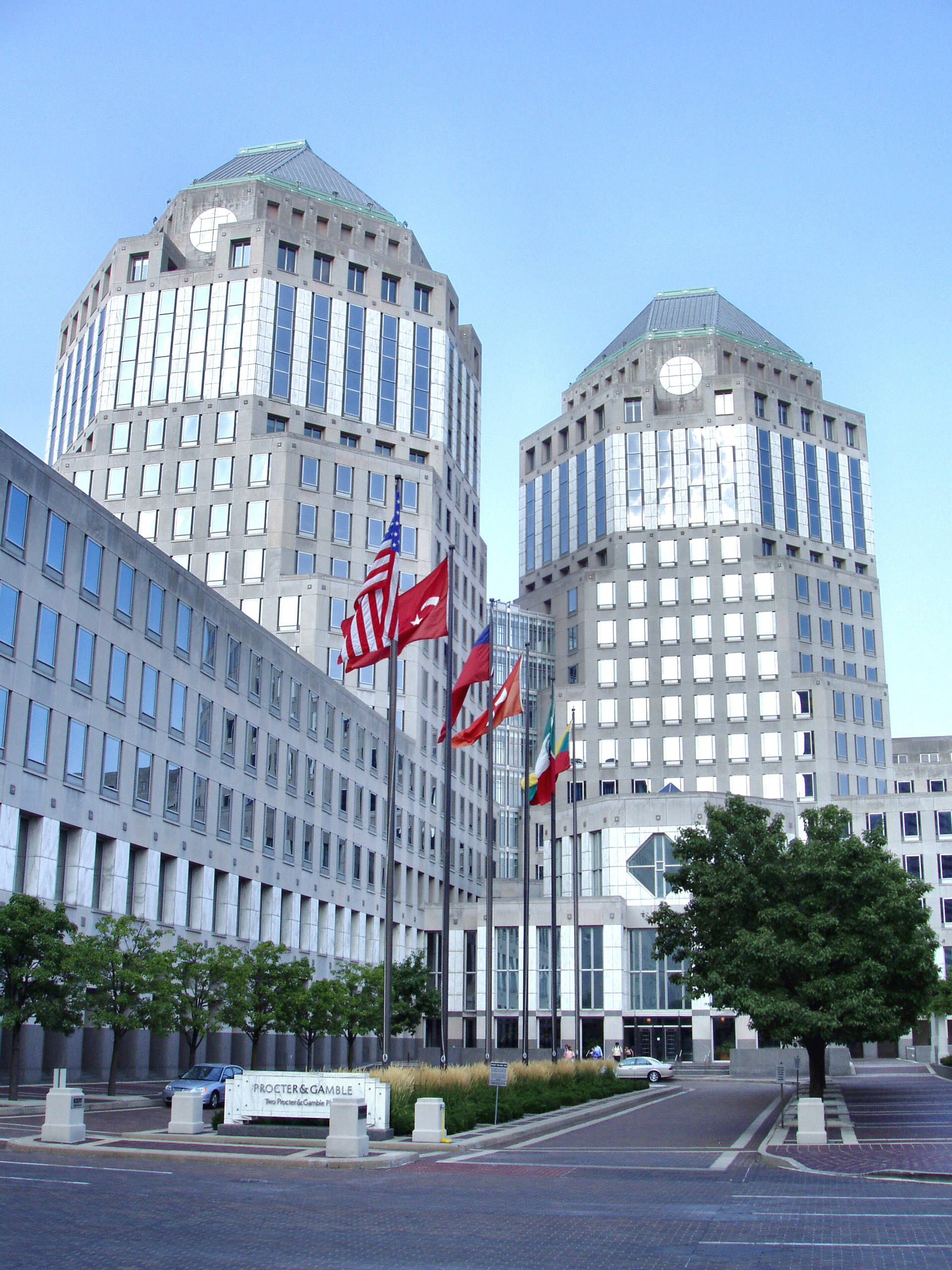
Procter & Gamble's headquarters in Cincinnati. The company is responsible for the first synthetic detergent used on delicate clothing, Dreft, the first shampoo and conditioner combination product, Pert Plus, and the first concentrated tablet laundry detergent, Salvo.

- The Research Institute at Nationwide Children's Hospital
- Procter & Gamble
- B&C Research, Inc., a division of Alcoa
- Honda of America
- House Care Research Center
- GE Aviation
- Rolls-Royce
- General Dynamics
- MacAulay-Brown
- Arctic Slope Regional Corporation
- Ross Laboratories
- Cardinal Health
- Babcock & Wilcox Company Research Center
- Keithley Instruments, Inc.
- Swagelok Co.
- Neoprobe
- Amylin Pharmaceuticals
- Bridgestone Technical Center
- Charles River Laboratories Ashland (formerly WIL Research Laboratories)
- Chemical Abstracts Service
- Diagnostic Hybrids, Inc.
- Parker Hannifin
- Dana Holding Corporation
- Delphi Technologies
- Goodyear
- PPG Industries
- Ashland Chemical
- Lincoln Electric
- Rockwell Automation Technologies
- Ethicon Endo-Surgery
- Scotts Miracle-Gro
- Global Cardiovascular Innovation Center
- Nestlé
- Pilkington North America
- AK Steel
- First Solar
- Global Titanium Research and Development Center
- North American Science Associates (NAMSA)

=== Collegiate ===
Collegiate institutions in Ohio conducting major research and development include:

- Ohio State University
- Case Western Reserve University
- Cleveland State University
- Miami University
- University of Cincinnati
- Wright State University

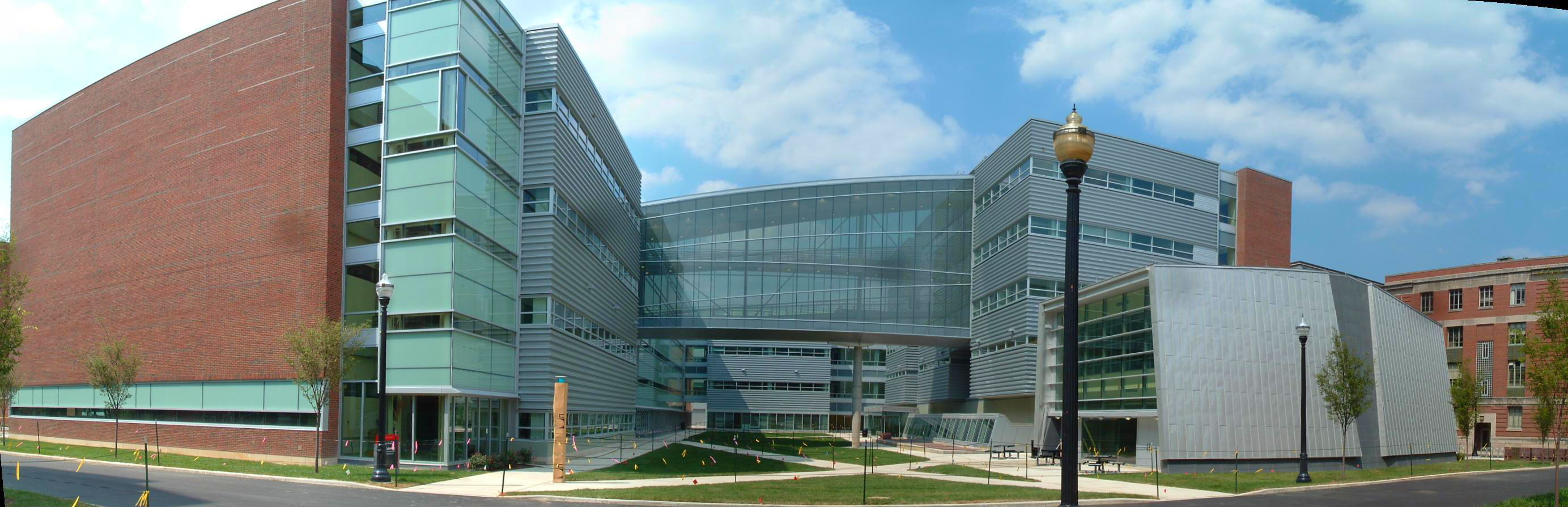
Scott Laboratory at the Ohio State University, Columbus

- Medical College of Ohio
- Kent State University
- University of Toledo
- University of Dayton
- Ohio University
- University of Akron
- Bowling Green State University
