= Lauren Bakaletz =

American medical researcher

Lauren O. Bakaletz
- Education: Ohio State University
- Scientific career
- Fields: Bacterial pathogenesis
- Workplaces: The Ohio State University; Nationwide Children's Hospital

Lauren Opremcak Bakaletz is a Professor of both Pediatrics and Otolaryngology at The Ohio State University and at the Center for Microbe and Immunity Research at The Abigail Wexner Research Institute at Nationwide Children's Hospital in Columbus, Ohio.

== Research ==
The Bakaletz lab studies the molecular mechanisms behind polymicrobial infections - particularly Haemophilus influenzae and Moraxella catarrhalis - in a variety of human disease states, including the respiratory tract and infections of the middle ear (otitis media).

== Awards ==
Bakaletz was elected to the American Academy of Microbiology in 2020.
