= Buerger Center for Advanced Pediatric Care =

- Children's Hospital of Philadelphia
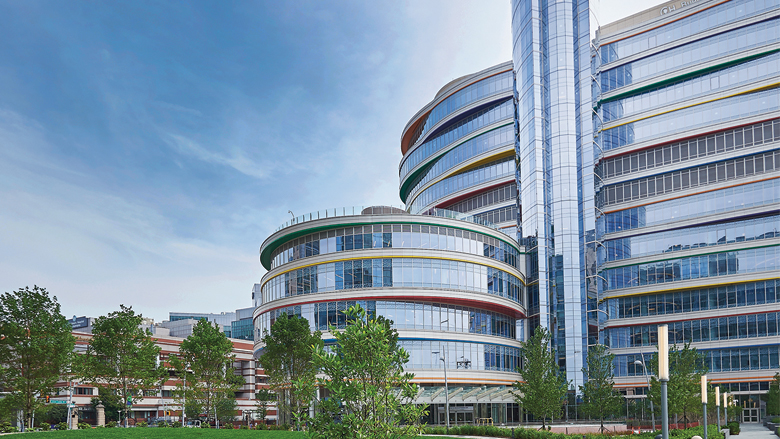
- Exterior of the Buerger Center for Advanced Pediatric Care

- Location within Pennsylvania

Geography
- Location: 3500 Civic Center Boulevard, Philadelphia, Pennsylvania, United States
- Coordinates: 39.948°N 75.193°W

Organization
- Care system: Pediatric
- Type: Outpatient
- Affiliated university: Children's Hospital of Philadelphia

History
- Opened: 2015

Links
- Website: www.chop.edu/locations/buerger-center-advanced-pediatric-care
- Lists: Hospitals in Pennsylvania

The Buerger Center for Advanced Pediatric Care is a pediatric outpatient facility operated by the Children's Hospital of Philadelphia (CHOP) in the University City neighborhood of Philadelphia, Pennsylvania. Completed in 2015, the 12-story, 700,000-square-foot (65,000 m^{2}) building forms part of CHOP's Raymond G. Perelman Campus and is recognized for its distinctive architectural design.

== History ==
Construction of the Buerger Center began in 2013, following a $50 million donation from the Buerger family—Alan, Constance, Reid, Krista, and Grant Buerger—which was among the largest naming gifts for a building in Philadelphia's history. The $650 million project, part of CHOP's South Campus expansion, was funded through a $200 million bond issue, hospital reserves, and contributions from over 4,200 donors, including 1,300 CHOP employees. The building opened to patients on July 27, 2015, with a formal ribbon-cutting ceremony on November 7, attended by civic leaders, hospital staff, and the Buerger family.

== Design and Features ==
Designed by Pelli Clarke Pelli Architects in collaboration with FKP Architects and CannonDesign, the Buerger Center is a 12-story structure defined by its curvilinear glass façade, which creates a flowing, wave-like silhouette against the Philadelphia skyline. The exterior incorporates a palette of orange, yellow, and green panels, selected to convey a sense of vibrancy and warmth for pediatric patients, as noted by the design team. The façade's glass panels, totaling over 120,000 square feet, were engineered for thermal performance, balancing natural light with energy efficiency.

The building's floors vary in size and shape, with clinical spaces organized along a rectilinear spine—a structural core that ensures stability—while waiting areas and communal spaces are offset in a cantilevered arrangement to maximize daylight exposure. This layout improves the interior space and forms a repeating pattern on the exterior, adding to the building's overall shape. A significant construction challenge was the installation of the curving curtain wall, which required a unitized system with custom glazing to ensure water resistance and energy efficiency, as detailed by Turner Construction, the project's general contractor.

Additional architectural features include a five-story underground parking garage with 1,500 spaces, addressing the urban site's spatial constraints, and a 3-acre green roof—the largest in Philadelphia—which supports stormwater management and contributes to the building's LEED Silver certification. A 14,000-square-foot rooftop garden provides a space for patient rehabilitation, featuring accessible pathways and shaded seating areas. The campus also includes a 2.6-acre landscaped plaza with a Children's Discovery Garden, designed with interactive elements to engage young visitors, and a second-floor pedestrian bridge linking the center to CHOP's main hospital.

== Services ==
The Buerger Center functions as an outpatient facility for pediatric care, offering specialties such as cardiology, neurology, dermatology, endocrinology, and radiology, among others. It was designed to accommodate over 200,000 patient visits annually.

== Recognition ==
In 2017, the Buerger Center received the Best Healthcare Project award from the Engineering News-Record, with judges citing its innovative design and high-quality construction. Architectural Digest described the building as a “bold” addition to CHOP's campus, highlighting its distinctive architecture and thoughtful design.
