= Mark Peeples =

Mark E. Peeples is an American biologist, focusing on protein structure and folding, and the molecular basis of disease and virology. He is doing research on RSV infection. He is currently at The Research Institute at Nationwide Children's Hospital and Ohio State University and is an Elected Fellow of the American Association for the Advancement of Science.
