= Tata Medical Center =

Tata Medical Center টাটা মেডিকেল সেন্টার
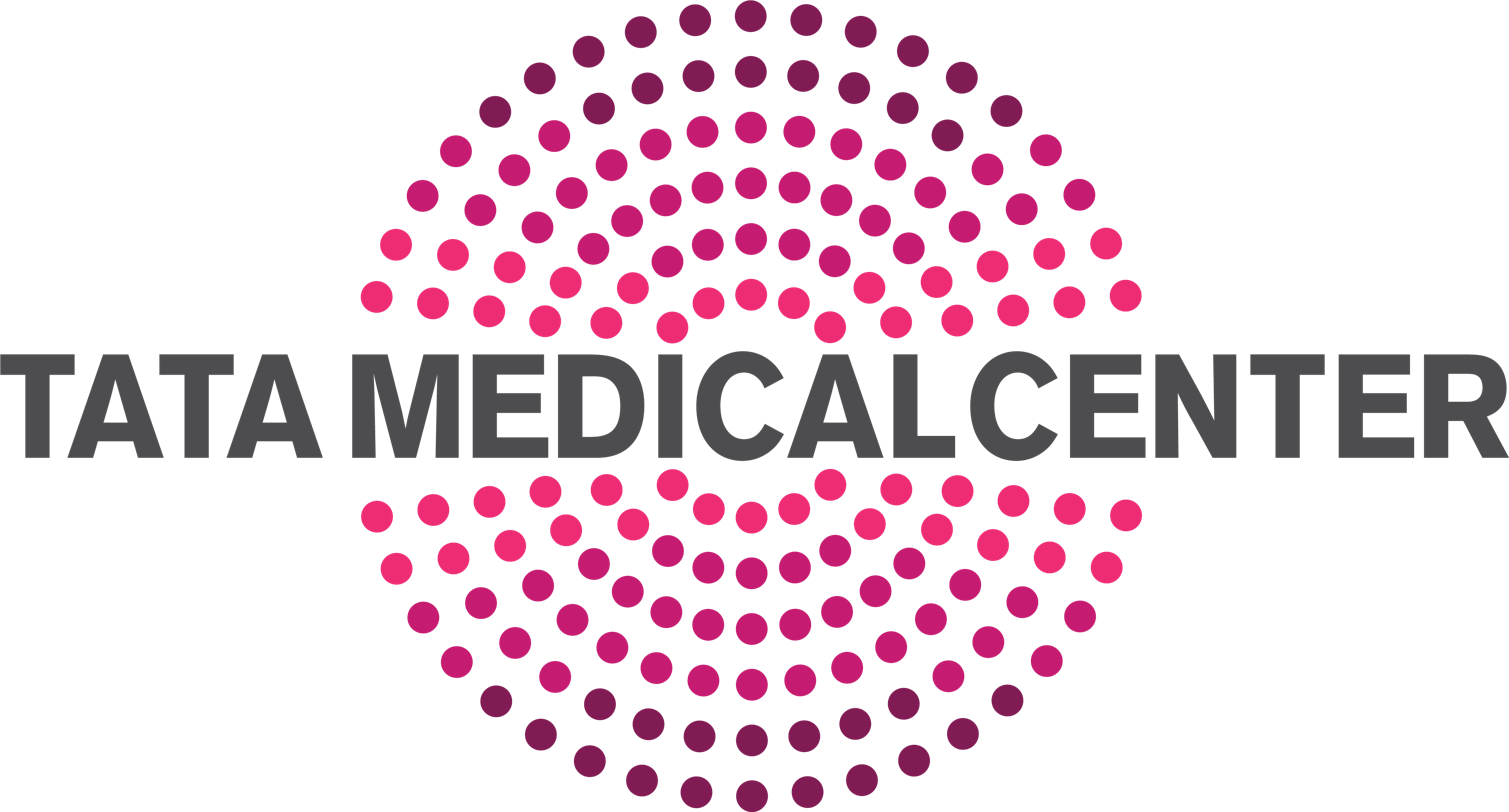

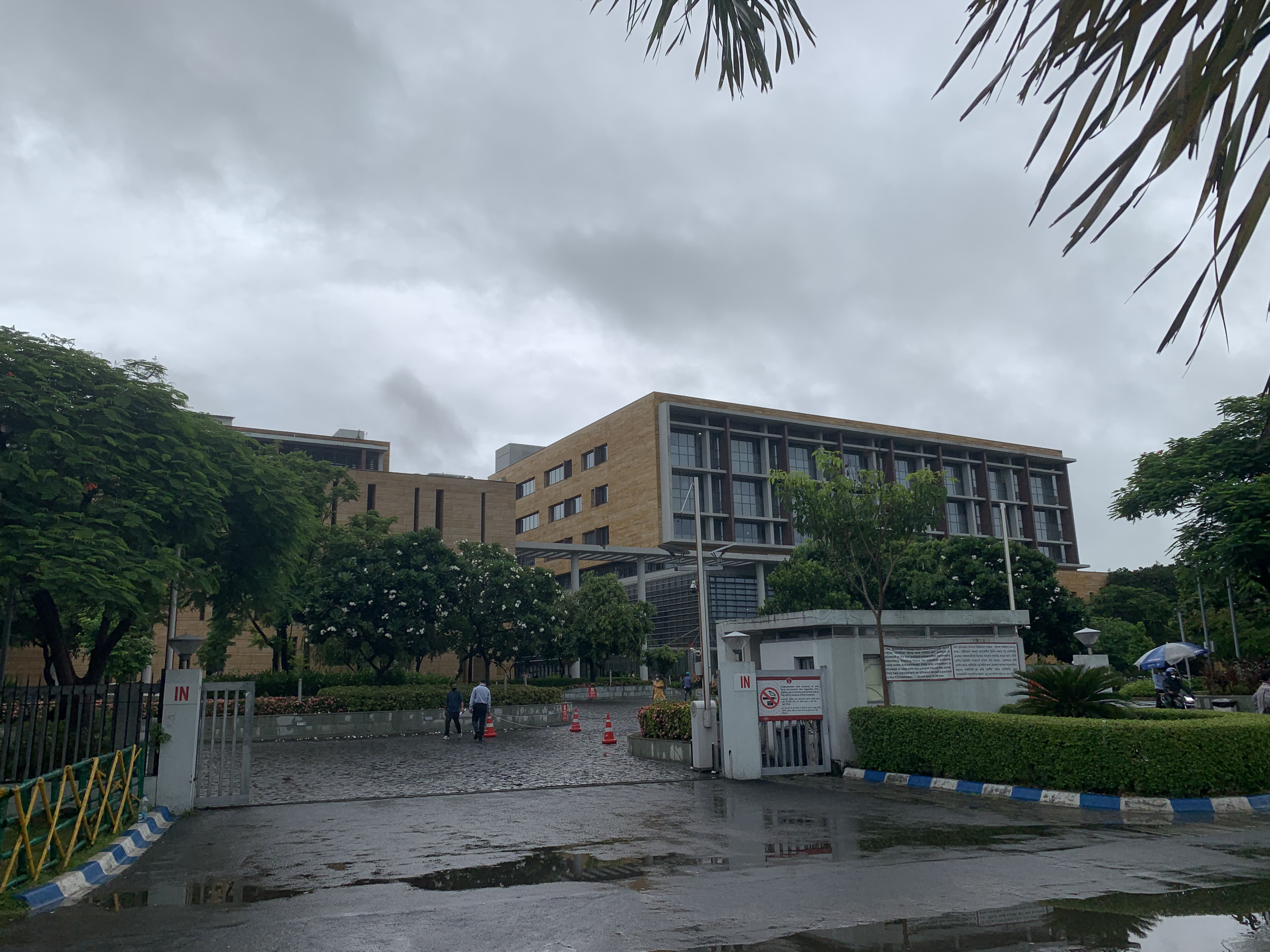
- Tata Medical Centre in Kolkata, 2021

Geography
- Location: Kolkata, West Bengal, India
- Coordinates: 22.576082°N 88.473117°E

Organisation
- Type: Specialist
- Affiliated university: NBE; WBUHS

Services
- Beds: 437
- Speciality: Oncology; Teaching hospital

History
- Founded: 16 May 2011; 15 years ago

Links
- Website: tmckolkata.com

Tata Medical Center (TMC) is a medical center or hospital located on New Town in Kolkata Metropolitan Area, West Bengal. It is one of the 62 regional cancer centers in India. In 2011, the hospital started operations with 160 beds.

The hospital was designed by Canon Design, a renowned North American architectural firm. It is situated on 13 acres of land in New Town, Kolkata, West Bengal.

The medical center specializes in prevention, early diagnosis, treatment and rehabilitation of cancer patients in West Bengal as well as neighboring states and neighboring countries. The hospital with a capacity of 431 beds caters to all sections of the society, with 75% of its infrastructure earmarked for subsidized treatment for the underprivileged.

== History ==
Tata Medical Center was conceptualized in 2004 as a philanthropic initiative for the eastern and northeastern parts of India and neighboring countries. In 2011, the hospital was inaugurated by Ratan Tata. Tata Medical Center (TMC) started operations on 16 May 2011. The hospital is governed by the "Tata Medical Center Trust", a charitable trust established in 2005.

In January 2018, an event was organized in Kolkata to announce the fund-raising for the second phase expansion of the Tata Medical Center. Former Indian cricket captain Sourav Ganguly was present at this event. The construction of the second phase of the hospital was completed in 2019, and it started operations on 14 February 2019. Indian Oil provided a part of the funds spent on setting up the second phase of the hospital. In 2019, Indian Oil Director Ranjan Kumar Mohapatra inaugurated the second phase in the presence of Tata Medical Center Director Mammen Chandy. During this phase the number of hospital beds increased, a percentage of which was reserved for underprivileged patients. On 28 March 2022, Tata Medical Center added 254 new beds dedicated to cancer treatment.

== Facilities ==
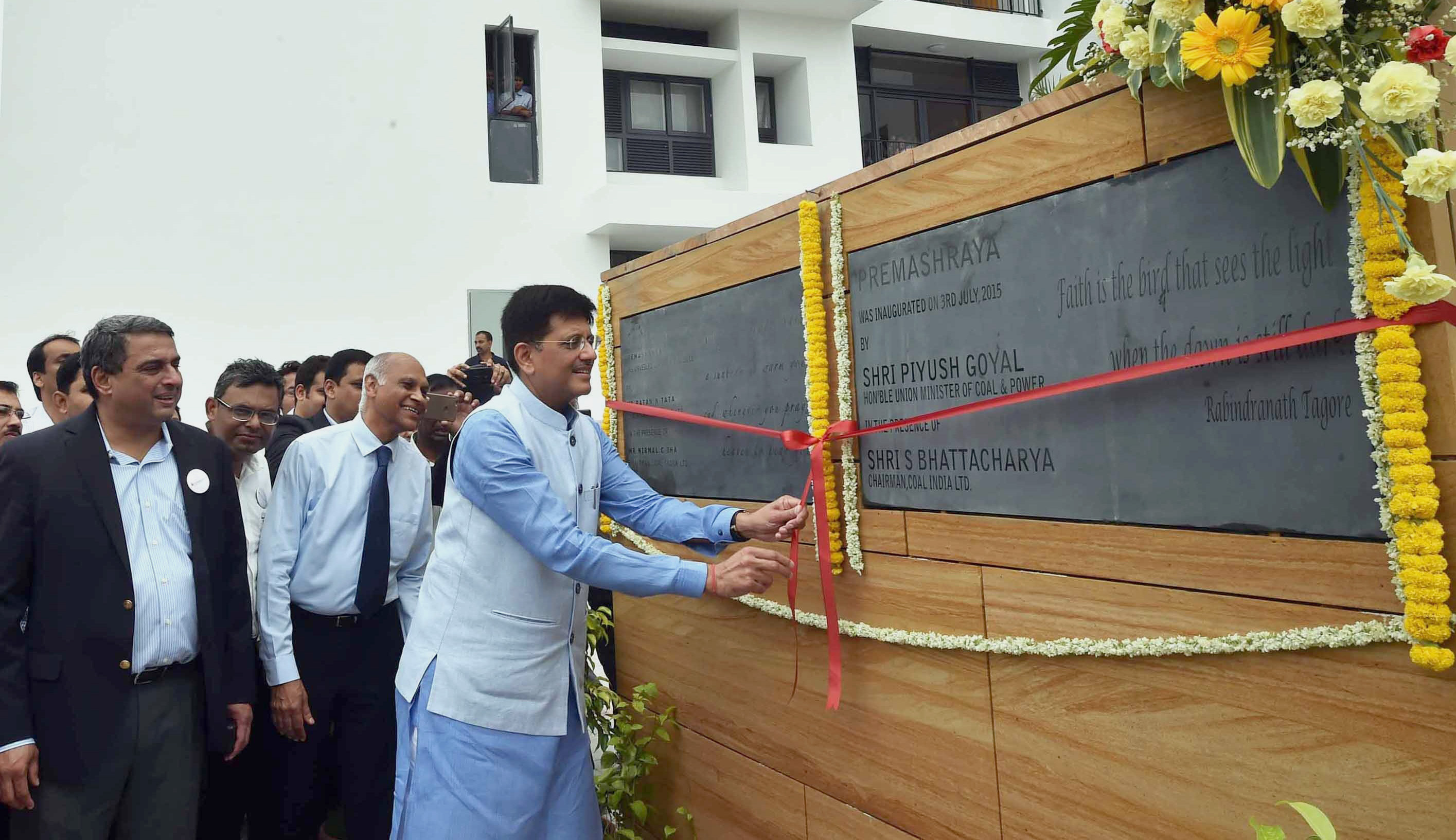
The Minister of State (Independent Charge) for Power, Coal and New and Renewable Energy, Shri Piyush Goyal inaugurating the Premasharay – a home for Cancer patients and Relatives of Tata Medical Center, built by CSR initiative of Coal India Limited, at Rajarhat, New Town, Kolkata on July 03, 2015.

Tata Medical Center consists of three institutions, which are the hospital, Premashraya and the Tata Translational Cancer Research Centre.

The main hospital campus is one of three institutes established for cancer management. The hospital has more than 400 beds, and treats cancer patients. Diagnosis and treatment are characterized by a multidisciplinary approach with disease management teams. Premashraya is a residential facility for outstation patients and their relatives. It is located 1 km from the main hospital campus. Tata Translational Cancer Research Center (TTTRC) is a dedicated research facility embedded within Tata Medical Center. It was established in 2014, and moved to dedicated facilities in April 2018. The institute is housed within a dedicated academic space and is spread over 3 floors. A multidisciplinary team of clinicians, scientists, academics, and industry professionals is engaged to develop a systems medicine approach to cancer research.

=== Education ===
The Institution has started M.Sc. in Medical –Surgical Nursing – Oncology Nursing Speciality Course from 2013 under WBUHS affiliations. To excel in Service, Education and Research The Institution runs multiple paramedical courses under affiliation of State Medical Faculty of West Bengal since 2017. From 2017 The Institution and Indian Institute of Technology Kharagpur jointly started multiple Integrated MSc-PhD courses. Since 2019 The Hospital running several National Board of Examinations accredited DNB, DrNB Super specialty, FNB Super specialty courses collaboration way with other reputed Premier hospital and Medical colleges. Regularly The Institution run fellowship programmes aim at training the Fellow in the concerned specialty and the allied specialties in clinical practice, academics and research.

=== Research ===
Tata Medical Center, Kolkata, and the Indian Institute of Technology, Kharagpur, have launched India's first fully annotated, relational, de-identified cancer image bank, Comprehensive Archive of Imaging (CHAVI).
