= Niagara Falls City Hall =

- U.S. National Register of Historic Places
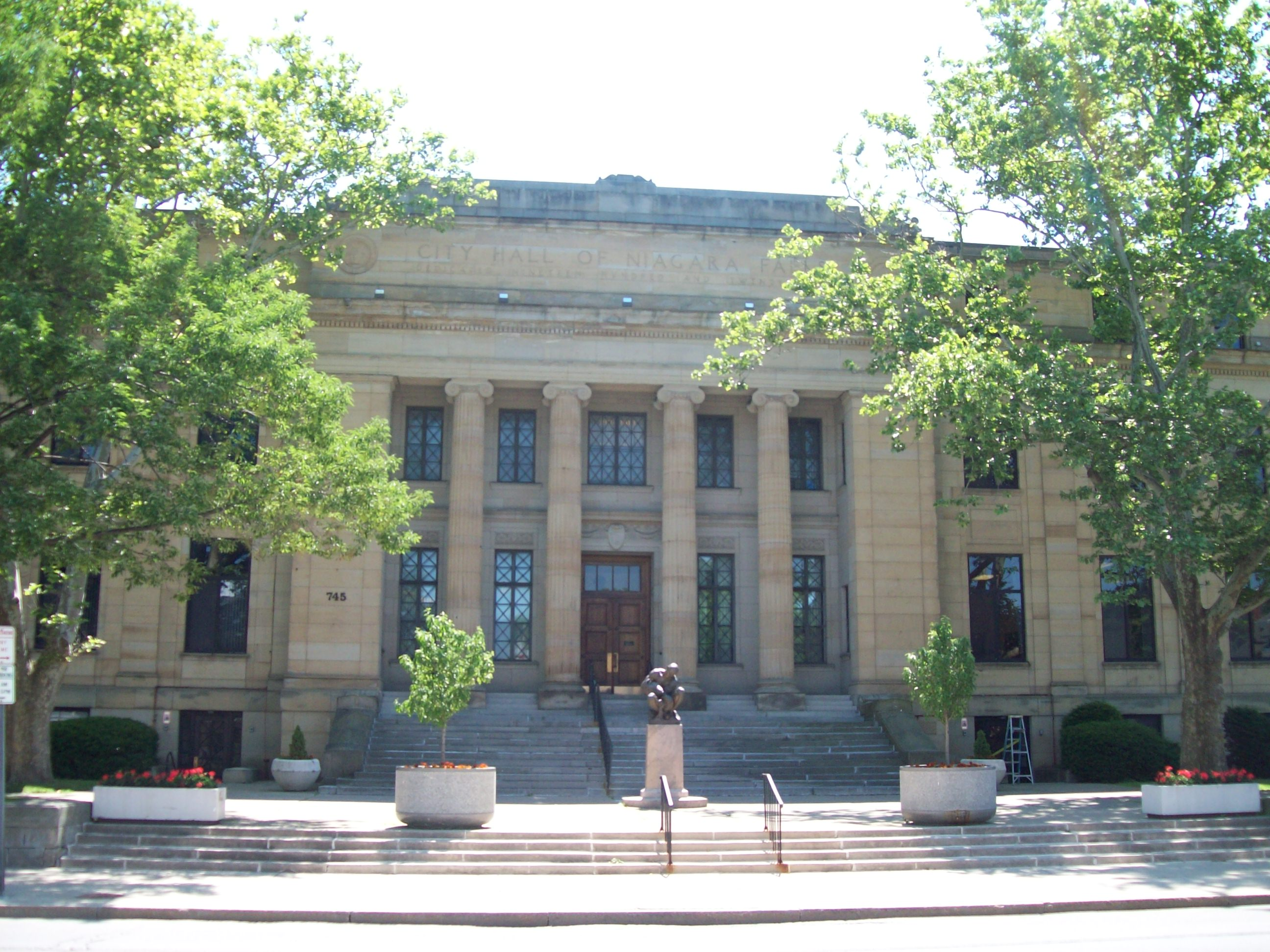
- Niagara Falls City Hall, June 2009

- Location within New York Location within the United States
- Location: 745 Main St., Niagara Falls, New York
- Coordinates: 43°5′45″N 79°3′19″W
- Built: 1923–1924
- Built by: Braas Bros. Co.
- Architect: Kirkpatrick & Cannon
- Architectural style: Beaux Arts
- NRHP reference No.: 00001688
- Added to NRHP: January 26, 2001

Niagara Falls City Hall is a historic city hall located at Niagara Falls in Niagara County, New York. It was constructed in 1923–1924, in the Beaux-Arts style. The building embodies Neo-Classical Revival architectural details. It features a centrally arranged rectangular form, with a central projecting pavilion, fluted columns with Ionic capitals, and smooth ashlar sandstone walls with pilasters.

It was listed on the National Register of Historic Places in 2001.

== Gallery ==
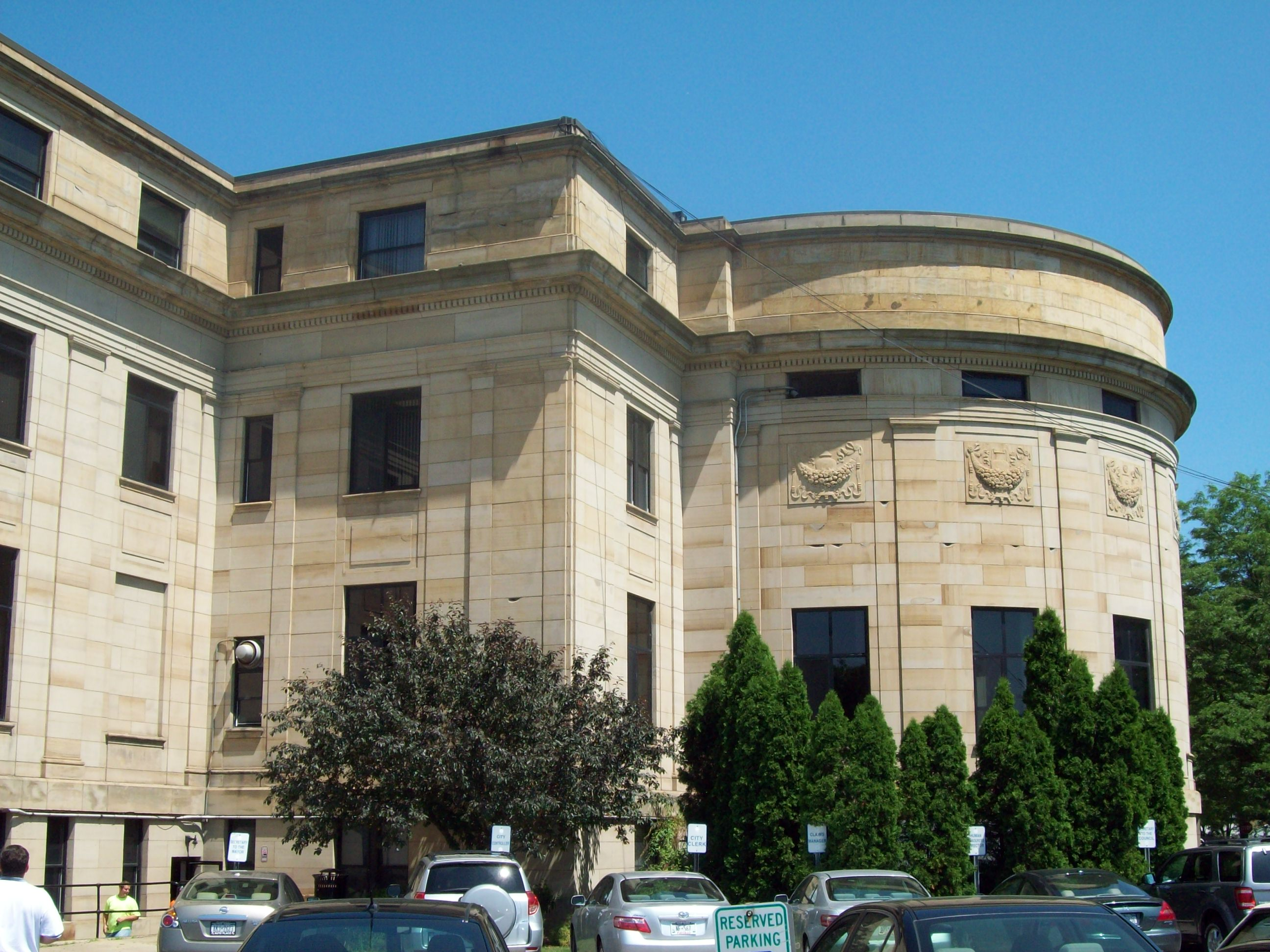
Niagara Falls City Hall, Rear view
