= Ganeden =

Ganeden, Inc.
- Company type: Private
- Genre: Probiotic ingredient manufacturer
- Founded: 1997; 29 years ago San Diego, California, U.S.
- Headquarters: Mayfield Heights, Ohio, U.S.
- Website: Official website

Ganeden, Inc. is a privately held United States probiotic ingredient manufacturer that sells its products to makers of foods and dietary supplements. It is based in Mayfield Heights, Ohio and was founded in 1997 in San Diego, California by Sean Farmer. The company's name, Ganeden, was derived from the Hebrew "Gan Eden", meaning Garden of Eden. The company moved to Ohio in 2000.

In 2011, Ganeden sold two of its probiotic brands, Sustenex and Digestive Advantage, to Schiff Nutrition International.

In 2017, the Irish-based Kerry Group acquired Ganeden for an undisclosed amount.
