= Armed Forces Institute of Regenerative Medicine =

Research institute (US)

The Armed Forces Institute of Regenerative Medicine (AFIRM) is a federally funded institution in the United States, which is committed to develop clinical therapies for the following five areas:

1. Burn repair
2. Wound healing without scarring
3. Craniofacial reconstruction
4. Limb reconstruction, regeneration or transplantation
5. Compartment syndrome, a condition related to inflammation after surgery or injury that can lead to increased pressure, impaired blood flow, nerve damage and muscle death

The Institute was established in 2008 by the United States Department of Defense.
