= Nationwide Children's Hospital =

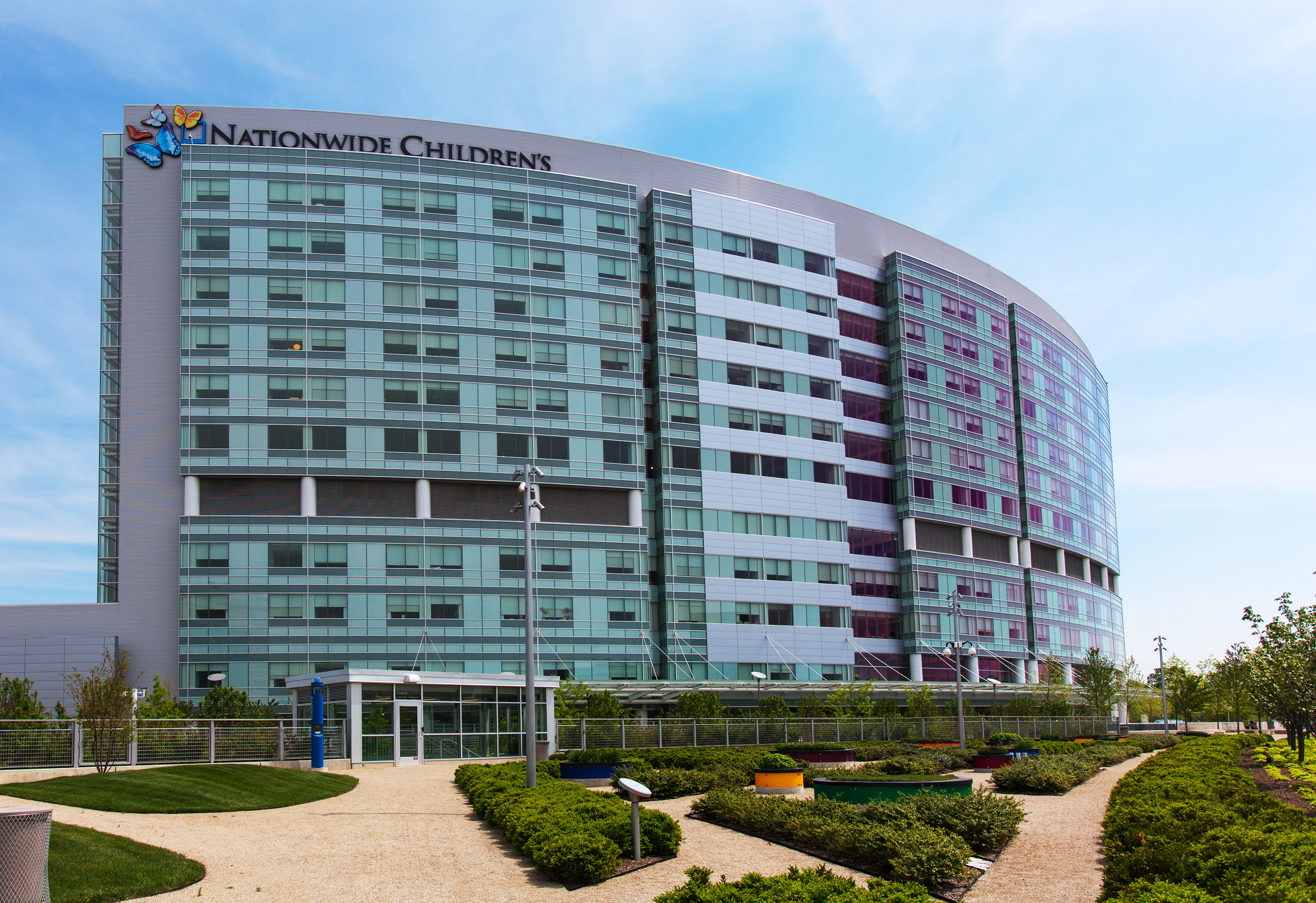
- Nationwide Children's Hospital in Columbus, Ohio, 2013

Geography
- Location: 700 Children's Dr., Columbus, Ohio, United States
- Coordinates: 39.953235°N 82.979359°W

Organization
- Type: Children's Teaching Hospital
- Affiliated university: Ohio State University College of Medicine

Services
- Emergency department: Level 1 Pediatric Trauma Center
- Beds: 673

Helipads
- Helipad: FAA LID: OI95

History
- Former name: Columbus Children's Hospital
- Founded: 1892

Links
- Website: nationwidechildrens.org
- Lists: Hospitals in Ohio
- Other links: The Research Institute at Nationwide Children's Hospital

Nationwide Children's Hospital (formerly Columbus Children's Hospital) is a nationally ranked pediatric acute care teaching hospital located in the Southern Orchards neighborhood of Columbus, Ohio. The hospital has 673 pediatric beds and is affiliated with the Ohio State University College of Medicine. The hospital provides comprehensive pediatric specialties and subspecialties to infants, children, teens, and young adults aged 0–21 throughout Ohio and surrounding regions. Nationwide Children's Hospital also sometimes treats adults that require pediatric care. Nationwide Children's Hospital also features an ACS-verified Level 1 Pediatric Trauma Center, one of four in the state. The hospital has affiliations with the nearby Ohio State University Wexner Medical Center. Nationwide Children's Hospital is located on its own campus; it has more than 1,379 medical staff members and over 11,909 total employees.

In recent years, the hospital has been ranked as one of America's Best Children's Hospitals by U.S. News & World Report and in 2023, the hospital was ranked as the 6th best overall children's hospital in the United States. The hospital has also been the recipient of numerous other awards.

== History ==
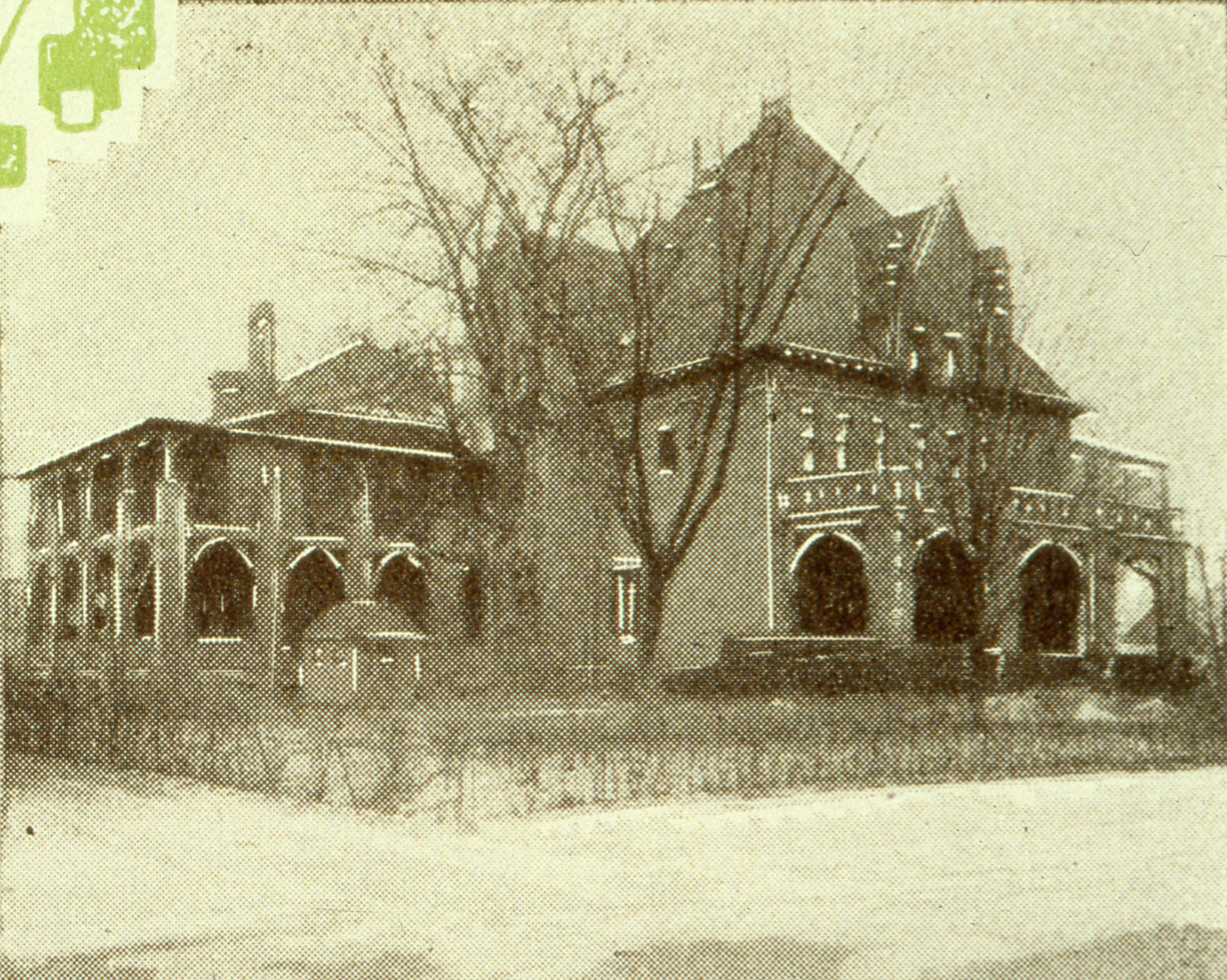
The first location of the hospital in Columbus

Children's Hospital of Columbus opened in 1892 with 9 patient beds, which quickly grew to 15 beds. In 1922, the cornerstone for the new hospital was laid, and in 1924, the new hospital opened accommodating 75 patients with the ability to expand to 150 beds immediately (eventually going to 300 beds). In 1931 that the hospital began taking private patients for $4 per week.

In 1954, construction began on the Sellers Wing, which was a physical therapy building used to house polio patients. In 1965, the federal government granted money to be used for the establishment of Children & Youth (C&Y) Clinics throughout the city. These clinics grew into the Close To Home network of clinics since government funding decreased and the hospital continued to privately support them.

The first successful kidney transplant in central Ohio was performed at Children's in 1966, on an 11-year-old boy. Also in 1966, a new infant intensive care service (NICU) opened, specializing in the care of the seriously ill infants. It was operated independently of the regular intensive care unit (ICU).

In 1999, Children's and OhioHealth announced a relationship to operate the Neonatal Special and Intensive Care units at OhioHealth Central Ohio hospitals, which are: Doctors Hospital West, Grant Medical Center and Riverside Methodist Hospital. The hospitals have since collaborated to provide pediatric emergency care at Ohio Health campuses and urgent care facilities throughout Ohio. On March 16, 2002, 13-year-old Brittanie Cecil was struck in the head by a deflected puck during a Columbus Blue Jackets' game against the Calgary Flames at Nationwide Arena. She was rushed to the hospital and died two days later, becoming the only NHL fan to be killed in a game-related accident. The family sued the Blue Jackets, the NHL, and the Nationwide Children's Hospital for failing to detect a torn artery.

In 2003, Children's began an $80 million, 160,000-square-foot (15,000 m^{2}) clinical expansion and started renovating 100,000 square feet (9,300 m^{2}) of existing space. Children's became the first freestanding children's hospital in Ohio to receive "Magnet Recognition" in 2004, which is the highest honor for excellence in nursing. In 2005, the hospital performed its first lung transplant on a 23-year-old cystic fibrosis (CF) patient. In 2006, a "Domino" heart and double lung transplant was performed, involving the world's youngest living heart donor. The transplant was performed successfully, by the Children's Hospital Heart Center team led by Dr. Mark Galantowicz.

In 2007, the hospital received a gift of $50 million from the Nationwide Foundation of the Nationwide Insurance Company of Columbus, Ohio. Columbus Children's Hospital was accordingly renamed to Nationwide Children's Hospital.

== Clinical services ==
In 2018, Nationwide Children's Hospital had 18,128 inpatient discharges, performed 38,036 surgeries and saw 1,468,343 outpatient visits. The hospital system has 125 specialties within its main downtown campus and its 34 outpatient care centers throughout the central Ohio area. These include sixteen Close To Home Centers, which offer diagnostic and therapeutic services, and eleven Primary Care Centers, which offer primary care check-ups for children from birth to age 21.

Six Close To Home Centers in Canal Winchester, Dublin, Downtown, East Columbus, Marysville and Westerville offer urgent care services. Other outpatient facilities include the Homecare Center, the Center for Autism Spectrum Disorders, the Sports Medicine and Orthopedic Center and the Orthopedic Center. Also on site is the Outpatient Care Center, which provides subspecialty ambulatory clinics; an outpatient lab and outpatient pharmacy, and pediatric and surgical specialists. The system also has an urgent care center that offers immediate treatment for illnesses and injuries that do not require hospital emergency department attention.

=== Family-centered care ===
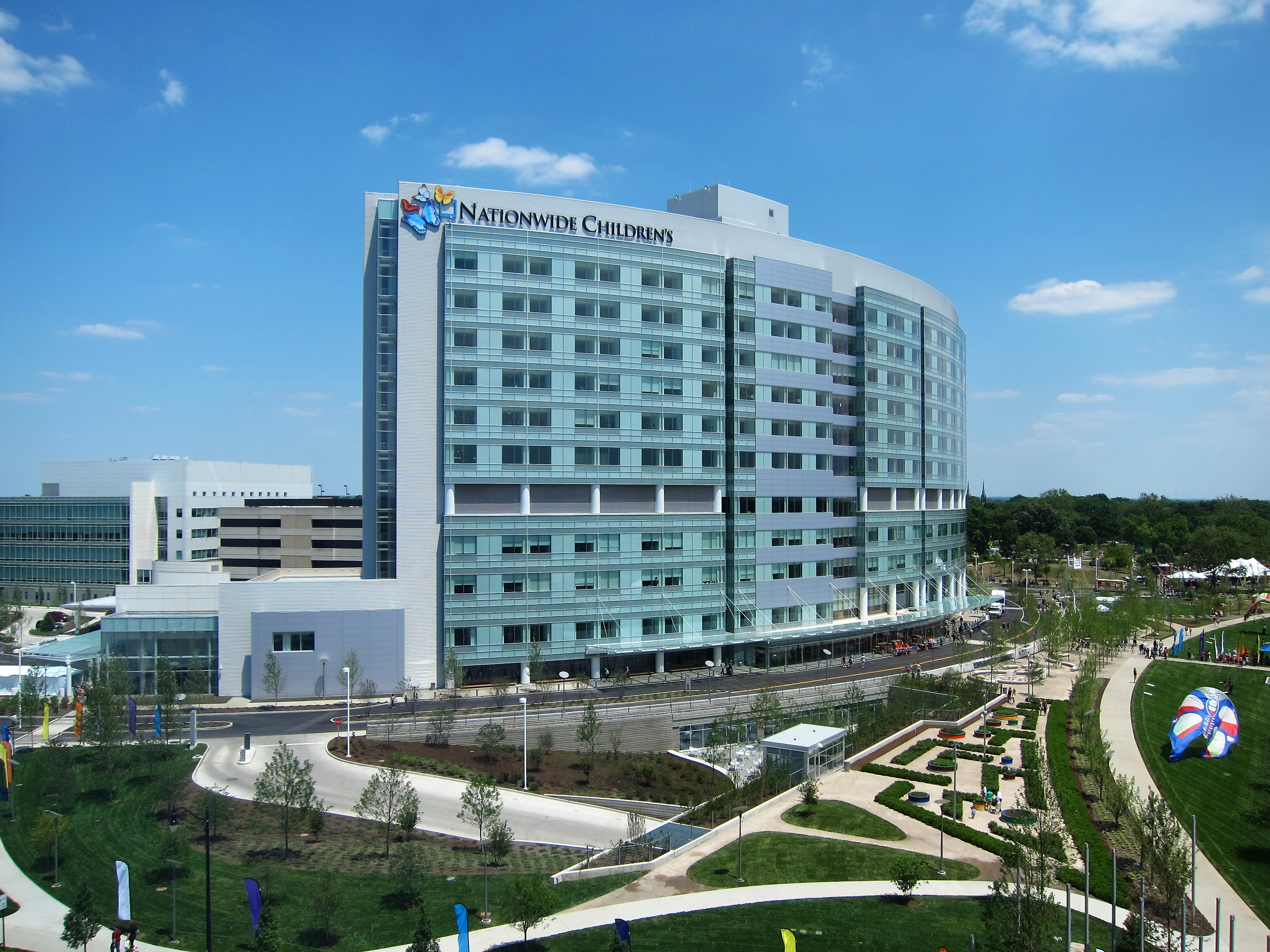
Hospital exterior, June 2012

The hospital provides "family-centered care", focusing on the family's needs, as well as the child's, to promote and maintain the health of the child in the context of the family and community.

== Research and education ==
=== Research ===
The Research Institute at Nationwide Children's Hospital is one of the fastest growing pediatric research centers in the United States. Organized research began after World War II with the recognition of E. coli III as a source and cause of epidemic diarrhea, and the development of a treatment for histoplasmosis. In 2009, among free-standing children's hospitals, The Research Institute ranked 9th based on NIH funding and amongst all other pediatric research organizations ranked 18th based on NIH funding.

The Research Institute contains Biobehavioral Health, Cardiovascular and Pulmonary Research, Childhood Cancer and Blood Diseases, Clinical and Translational Research, Gene Therapy, Injury Research and Policy, Innovation in Pediatric Practice, Microbial Pathogenesis, Genomic Medicine, Perinatal Research, Mathematical Medicine, and Vaccines and Immunity departments.

Children's Hospital Investigative Laboratory Division, CHILD, was created in the 1950s when the hospital realized a separate organization was needed to manage research. The first medical science research building at [Nationwide] Children's Hospital, Ross Hall, was completed in 1961. CHILD evolved into Children's Hospital Research Foundation, a non-profit corporation that was incorporated on May 12, 1964. In 1966, research expenditures exceeded $1 million for the first time. In 1987, the new Wexner Center for Pediatric Research opened. In 2003, Children's Hospital Research Foundation was renamed the Columbus Children's Research Institute. In the same year, the Research Institute not only began a human testing phase for a new HIV/AIDS vaccine, but they finished the year with $34 million in external research awards. A new 160,000-square-foot (15,000 m^{2}) research building opened in 2004. In 2006, the Nationwide Foundation donated a 10-year, $50 million gift to support child safety and injury prevention, neonatal intensive care, and the heart center at Nationwide Children's Hospital. In 2007, the Columbus Children's Research Institute was renamed The Research Institute at Nationwide Children's Hospital.

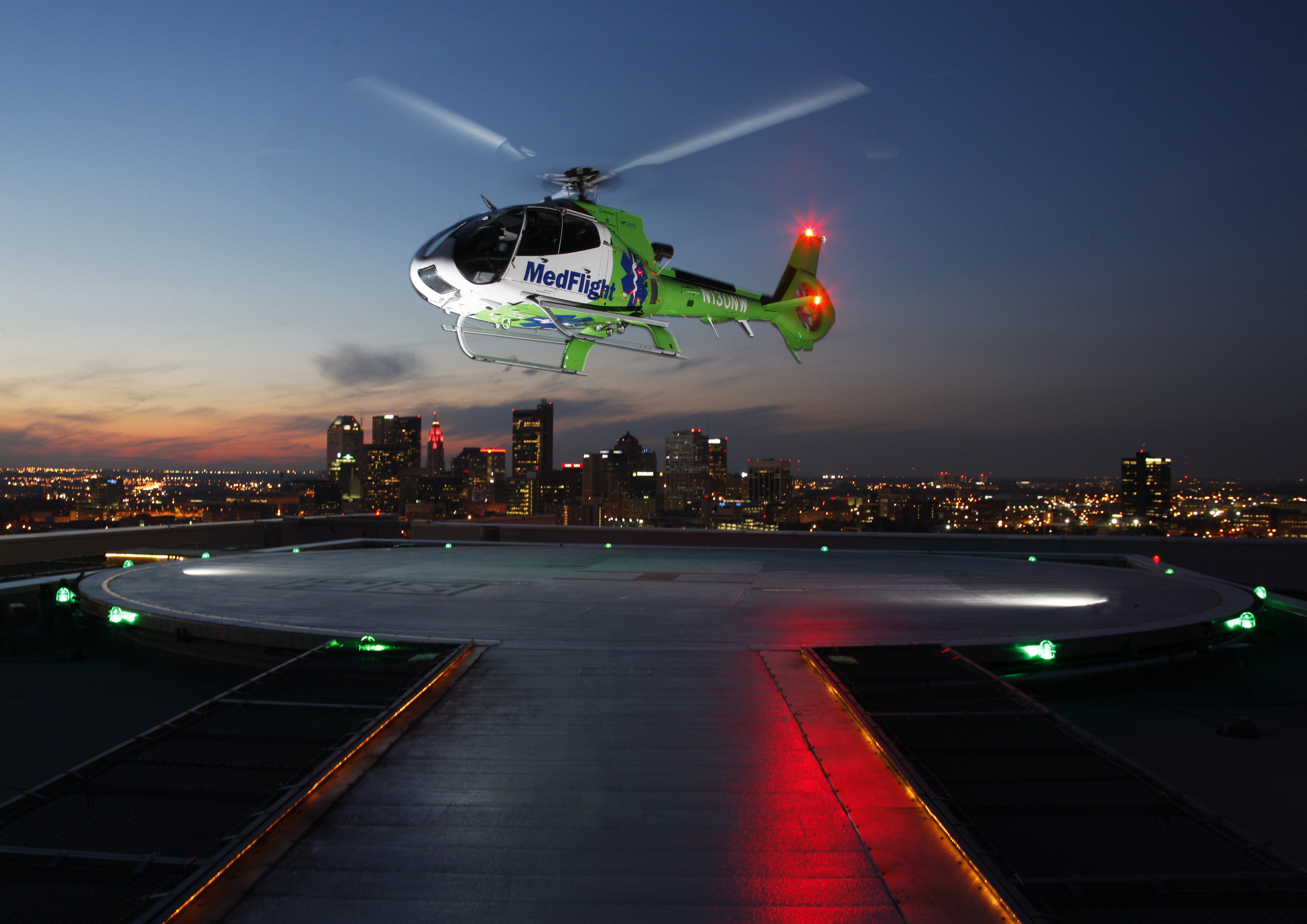
Helipad, November 2013

Prominent researchers at this institute include neurologist Jerry Mendell, who led the world's first clinical trial for gene therapy for duchenne muscular dystrophy at the institute in 2007.

=== Education ===
Nationwide Children's Hospital houses the Department of Pediatrics for The Ohio State University College of Medicine. It is a teaching hospital offering nationally recognized pediatric residencies and fellowships in medical and surgical specialties. The residency programs offered are a dual residency with OhioHealth's Doctors Hospital, Internal Medicine and Pediatric Residency, Genetics Residency, Pediatric Neurology, Pediatric Pharmacy, Pediatric Research Pathway, Pediatric Residency, and Pediatric Surgery. Fellowships are available in 33 areas of patient care, including Cardiology, Child Abuse and Maltreatment, Critical Care, Gastroenterology, Neonatal–Perinatal Medicine, Ophthalmology, and Surgical Critical Care.

In 1931, the pediatric residency program began at Children's Hospital. In 1937, the teaching of pediatrics was moved from the Starling Loving Hospital at Ohio State University to Children's Hospital. Dr. Earl H. Baxter became the first chairman of the Ohio State University Department of Pediatrics in 1943. The Pediatric Pathology residency program began in 1953 and was followed by the Pediatric Dentistry program in 1954. Dr. Bruce Graham became chairman of the Department of Pediatrics at OSU and the medical director of the hospital in 1964 and was the first to combine the two positions. Dr. Grant Morrow III became chairman of the Department of Pediatrics at OSU and Medical Director of the hospital in 1978. The Internal Medicine-Pediatrics residency program began in 1983, followed by the neonatology fellowship in 1984, and the Pediatric Hematology/Oncology fellowship in 1985. In 1990, construction began on the new $18.3 million education building that opened in 1992. Dr. Thomas N. Hansen was named chairman of the Department of Pediatrics at OSU and Medical Director of the hospital in 1995. The Department of Pediatrics was awarded the prestigious Ohio State University Departmental Teaching Excellence Award in 1999, and the Educational Building was renamed the Ann Isaly Wolfe Education Building in recognition of her support. In 2003, new fellowship programs begin in pediatric nephrology, pediatric ophthalmology, and pediatric physical medicine and rehabilitation. In 2004, another new residency program in pediatric orthopedic surgery began. Nationwide Children's Hospital is home to the International Symposium on the Hybrid Approach to Congenital Heart Disease (ISHAC).

The hospital has a large active education program with 252 interns and residents employed at the hospital.

== Expansion ==
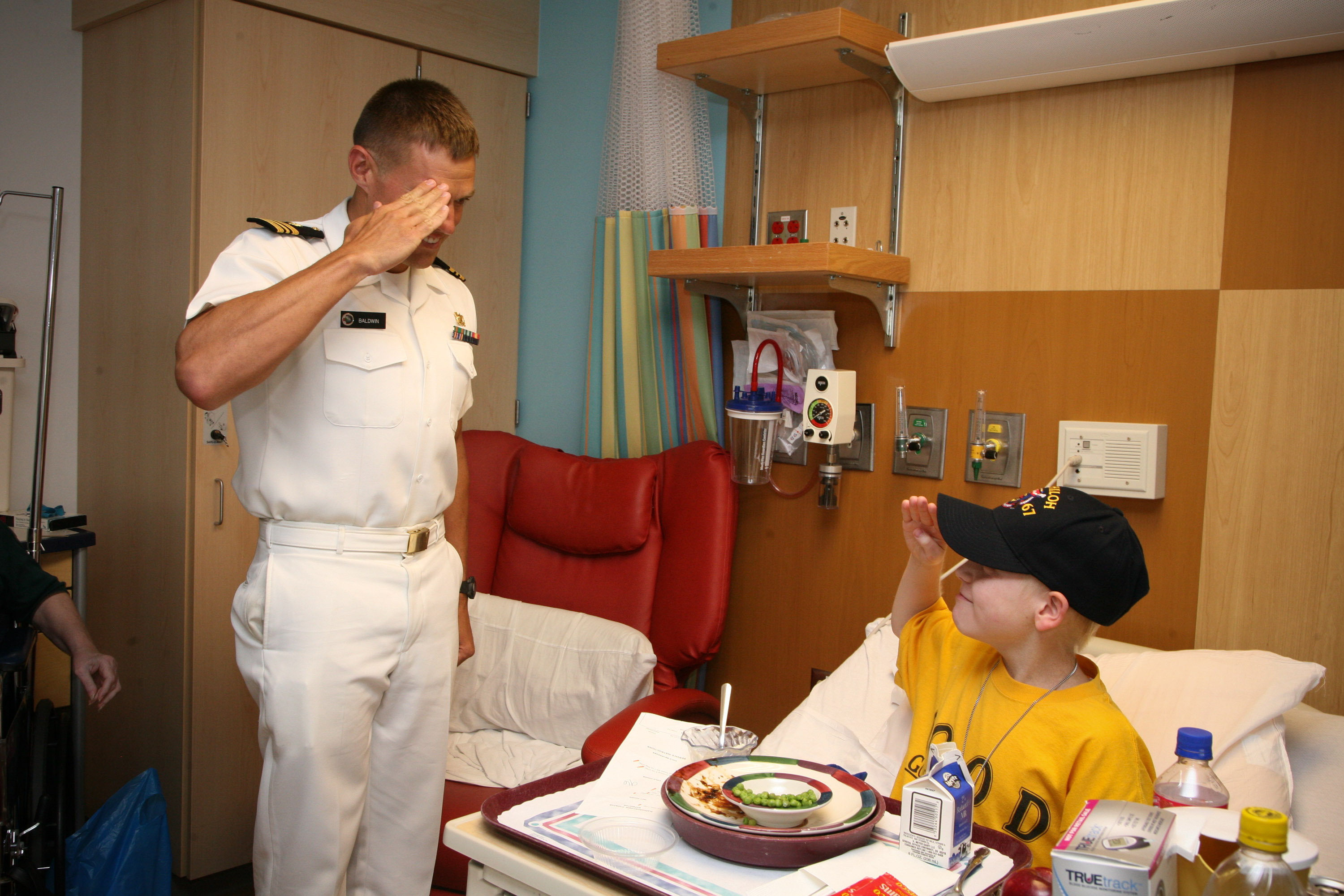
A Navy officer shows a young patient at Nationwide Children's Hospital how to salute after giving him a Navy ball cap. September 2009

Nationwide Children's Hospital opened a new, 12-story, 750,000-square-foot (70,000 m^{2}) main hospital on June 20, 2012, with select floors and patients transferred to individually complete floors from January 2012 onward. Other components of the hospital's 2012 Master Facilities plan included "Research III", a $93 million, six-floor research facility, which added 225,000 square feet (20,900 m^{2}) to the current 375,000 square feet (34,800 m^{2}) of research space. Research III will be home to the new Cardiovascular and Pulmonary Research Facility with state-of-the-art equipment including hybrid suites, and the Battelle Center for Mathematical Medicine. The successful expansion followed green design principles, including a LEED-certified new central energy plant.

Houston firm FKP Architects was the master designer for the expansion.

== Awards ==
In 2023, the hospital was ranked as the 6th best children's hospital in America by U.S. News & World Report. As of 2023, Nationwide Children's Hospital has placed nationally in all 10 ranked pediatric specialties on U.S. News & World Report for 10 years in a row.

U.S. News & World Report Rankings for Nationwide Children's Hospital
Specialty	Rank (In the U.S.)	Score (Out of 100)
Neonatology	#18	75.2
Pediatric Cancer	#9	90.6
Pediatric Cardiology & Heart Surgery	#5	85.8
Pediatric Diabetes & Endocrinology	#12	78.0
Pediatric Gastroenterology & GI Surgery	#6	94.8
Pediatric Nephrology	#4	97.6
Pediatric Neurology & Neurosurgery	#6	95.0
Pediatric Orthopedics	#11	80.8
Pediatric Pulmonology & Lung Surgery	#3	98.1
Pediatric Urology	#8	87.4

== Controversy and criticism ==
=== Emergency department naming ===
In 2008, Nationwide Children's Hospital in Columbus planned to rename its emergency department the Abercrombie & Fitch Emergency Department and Trauma Center in exchange for a $10 million donation from Abercrombie & Fitch, a locally based retail clothing corporation. A letter written by the Campaign for a Commercial-Free Childhood and signed by over 100 doctors and children's advocacy groups urged the hospital not to go ahead with the renaming, arguing that, "Given this company's appalling history of targeting children with sexualized marketing and clothing, no public health institution should be advertising Abercrombie & Fitch." People all over the United States questioned the ethics of allowing a pediatric emergency room to be named after a clothing company.

== In popular culture ==
The hospital was consulted on in the Netflix series Diagnosis when 17-year-old Lashay Hamblin was diagnosed with rumination and was connected with specialists at the Nationwide Children's Hospital rumination program. The program is one of only few in the country. Due to distrust of doctors, Hamblin did not seek treatment at the hospital.

== See also ==
- List of children's hospitals in the United States
- Cincinnati Children's Hospital Medical Center
- Rainbow Babies & Children's Hospital
- Akron Children's Hospital
- Dayton Children's Hospital
