= FKP Architects =

- Company type: Private
- Industry: Architecture
- Headquarters: Houston, Texas, United States
- Number of locations: Dallas
- Key people: Brad Lukanic, CEO
- Services: Architecture, Interiors, Graphics, Planning

FKP Architects is an American architecture firm based in Houston, Texas. It specializes in the design of major academic, research, scientific, and healthcare projects. In 2017, FKP Architects merged with CannonDesign, a global architecture, engineering and planning firm.

== Awards ==
- 2010 Top 100 Green Design Firm
- 2010 Best Higher Education/Research Project, Texas Construction Magazine: Rice University BioScience Research Collaborative
- 2010 Award of Excellence, Higher Education/Research Project, Texas Construction Magazine: Texas A&M Health Science Center Health Professions Education Building
- 2010 Best in Commercial Real Estate, San Antonio Business Journal: UT Health Science Center at San Antonio Medical Arts and Research Center
- 2010 Landmark Award, Houston Business Journal: Texas Children's Hospital Feigin Center
- 2009 Beacon Award for Critical Care Excellence, American Association of Critical-Care Nurses, Children’s Hospital of Orange County Pediatric Intensive Care Unit
- 2008 Merit Award for Urban Planning, American Society of Landscape Architects, Texas A&M Health Science Center
- 2008 Landmark Award, Houston Business Journal: Memorial Hermann Hospital Southwest - Heart & Vascular Institute

== Current and recent projects ==
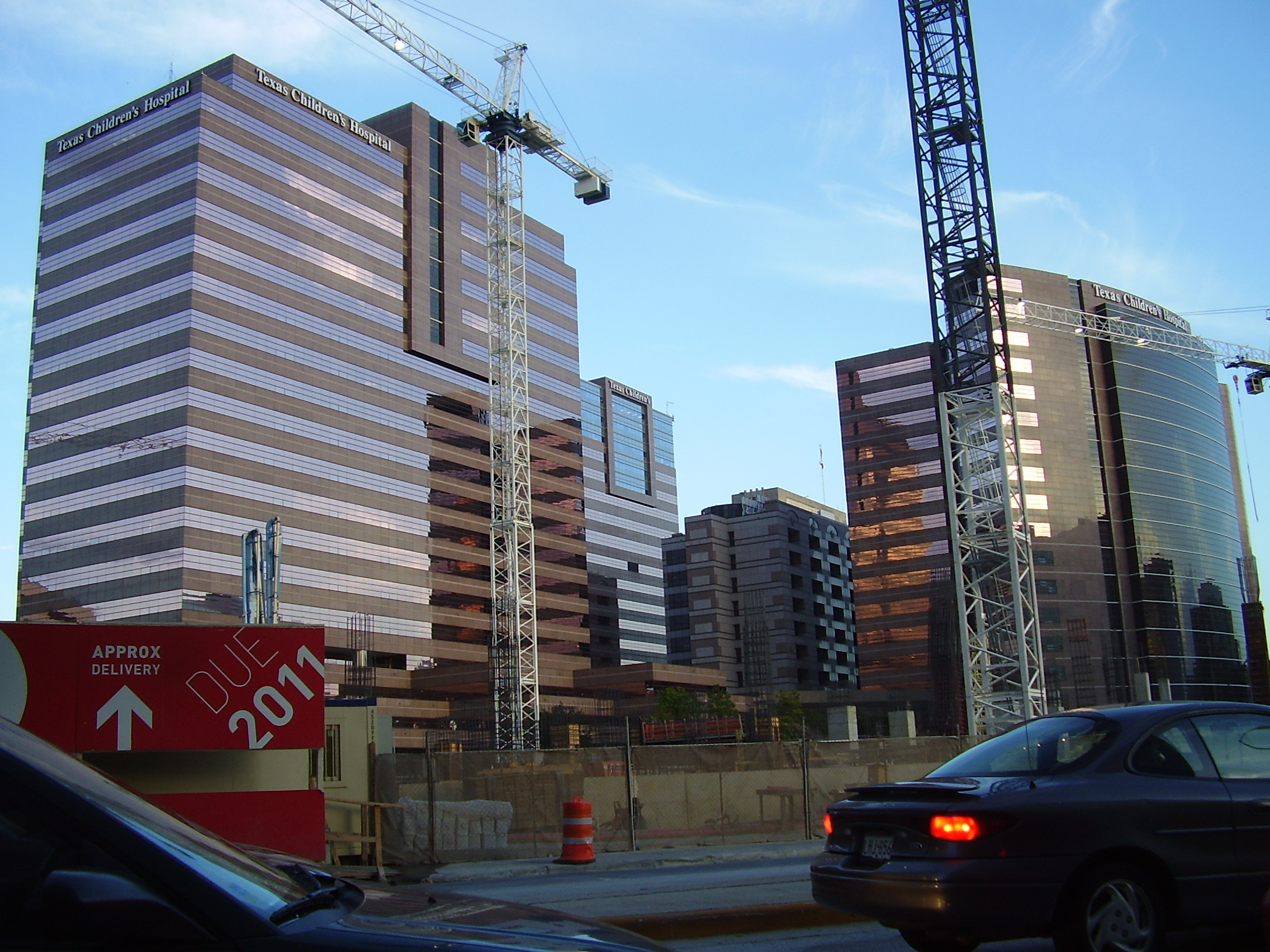
The Texas Children's Hospital is one of FKP's largest projects

- Texas Children's Hospital Pavilion for Women, Houston, Texas
- Medical Arts & Research Center (MARC), UTHSCSA, Texas
- Biotechnology, Sciences and Engineering Building I, UTSA, San Antonio, Texas
- Nationwide Children's Hospital, Columbus, Ohio
- Le Bonheur Children's Hospital, Memphis, Tennessee
- CHOC Children's Hospital, Tower II, California
- Cook Children's Medical Center, North Tower, Dallas, Texas
- The Children's Hospital of Denver, Colorado
- Texas A&M Health Science Center, Bryan Campus Master Plan, Texas
- Rice University, BioScience Research Collaborative, Houston, Texas
- University of Texas Southwestern Medical Center Outpatient facility, Dallas, Texas
- The University of Texas MD Anderson Cancer Center, Master Plan, Texas
