= National Center for Regenerative Medicine =

Medical research organization (US)

- Industry: Medical research
- Founded: Cleveland, Ohio, United States (2004)
- Founder: Case Western Reserve University, Cleveland Clinic, University Hospitals Case Medical Center
- Headquarters: Cleveland, Ohio, United States
- Area served: North America
- Number of employees: 100 researchers
- Divisions: Center for Stem Cell and Regenerative Medicine, Armed Forces Institute of Regenerative Medicine
- Website: https://case.edu/medicine/ncrm/

The National Center for Regenerative Medicine (NCRM) was founded in 2004 and specializes in regenerative medical research, while acting as the coordinating organization for other associated institutions.

== Institution coordination ==
The NCRM acts as a coordinating organization for the following institutions:

- Center for Stem Cell and Regenerative Medicine: developing basic and clinical research programs, biomedical and tissue engineering programs, and the development and administration of new therapies to patients
- Armed Forces Institute of Regenerative Medicine: developing clinical therapies for military-related injuries

== See also ==
- Stem cell laws
