= CannonDesign =

American architecture firm

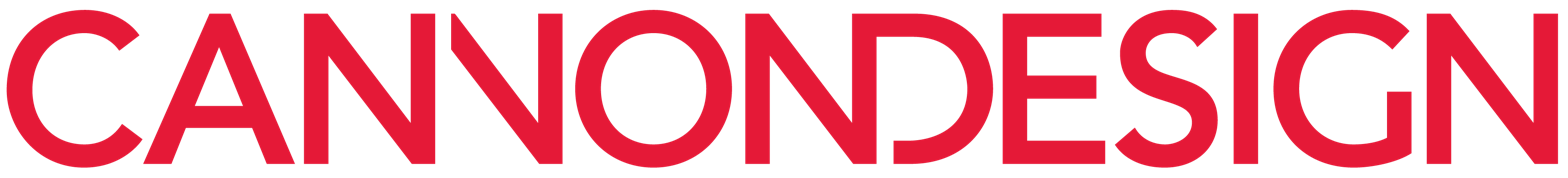
- Type: Private
- Industry: Architecture
- Founded: 1945; Niagara Falls, New York, U.S.
- Founders: Will Cannon, Sr.
- Headquarters: Buffalo, New York
- Area served: Worldwide
- Key people: Bradley Lukanic, CEO; Juliet Rogers; David Polzin; Robin Cibrano
- Services: Architecture; Interior design; Engineering; Consulting
- Number of employees: 1,400
- Website: www.cannondesign.com

CannonDesign is a global architecture, engineering and consulting practice that provides services for a range of project types, including hospitals and medical centers, corporate headquarters and commercial office buildings, higher education and PK-12 education facilities, hotels and hospitality, mixed-use, sports facilities, and science and research buildings. Brad Lukanic has been the CEO of the employee-owned firm since 2015. In 2017 and 2019, Fast Company named CannonDesign one of the 10 most innovative architecture firms in the world.

== History ==
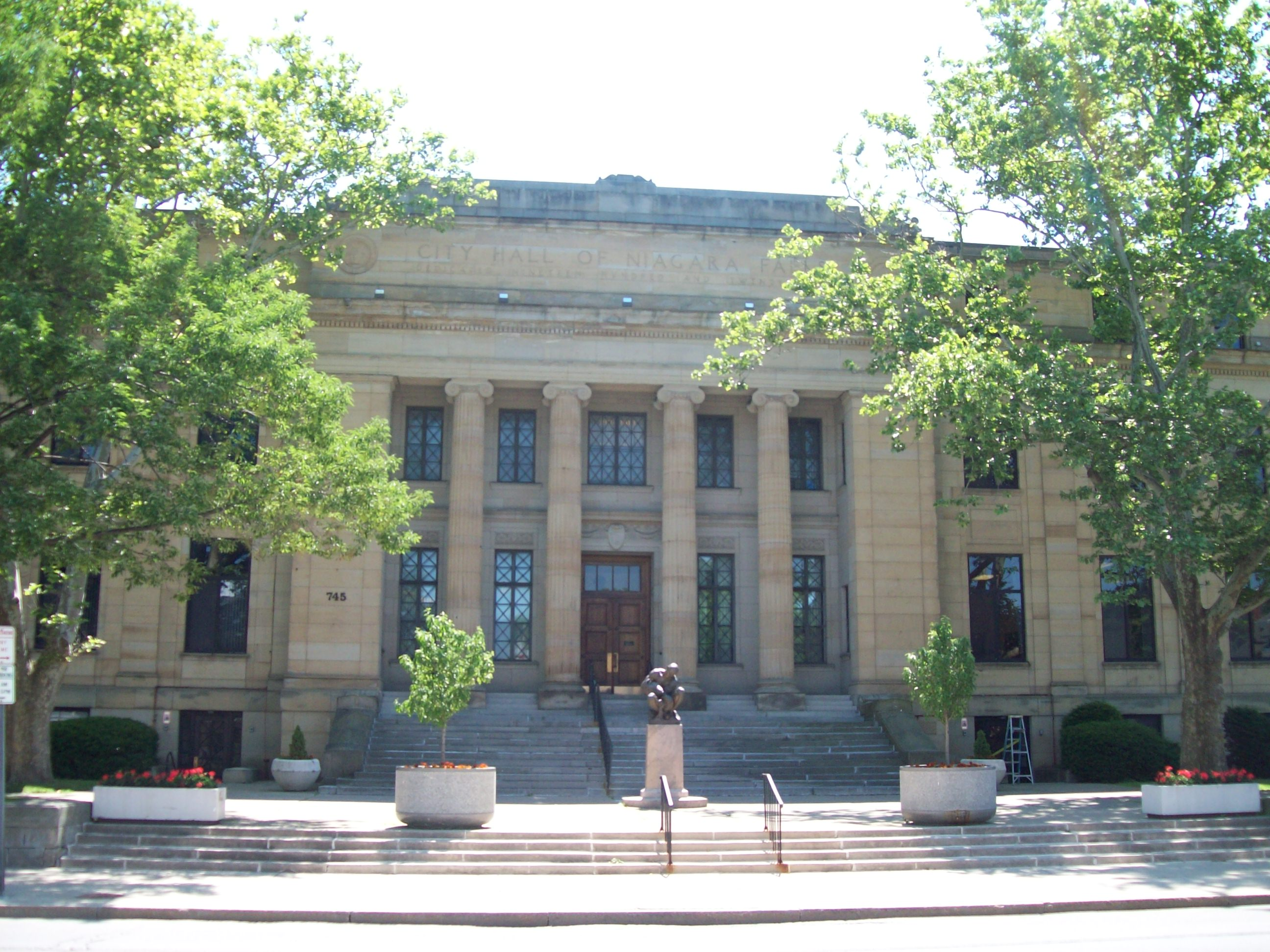
Niagara Falls City Hall

Will Cannon, Sr. started his architecture practice in Niagara Falls, New York, in 1915. He worked on Beaux-Arts style Niagara Falls City Hall in 1923. He and his sons, Will Jr. and Don, formed CannonDesign as a family business in 1945.

== Acquisitions ==
In 2009, the company acquired O'Donnell Wicklund Pigozzi & Peterson (OWP/P), a Chicago-based architecture firm.

In late 2014, CannonDesign acquired Pittsburgh firm Astorino Co. The deal allowed CannonDesign to expand its footprint into Pittsburgh.

In 2017, CannonDesign announced it was merging its global practice with FKP Architects, a Houston-based architecture firm with 90 employees. Denver-based Bennett Wagner Grody Architects also joined CannonDesign.

In 2018, gkkworks, an architectural and construction practice with a significant presence in Southern California and Denver, Colorado, joined CannonDesign.

In 2019, Blue Cottage Consulting merged with CannonDesign. The merger strengthened CannonDesign's consulting and planning capabilities within the healthcare, education and workplace sectors. Juliet Rogers assumed the role as President of the company. CannonDesign formed a strategic partnership with ModularDesign+, a modular design and prefabrication firm with a 100,000-SF warehouse in Euless, Texas.

In 2024, SRG Partnership, an architecture, interiors and planning firm with studios in Portland, Oregon, and Seattle, Washington, has joined CannonDesign. Going forward, SRG Partnership will be known as SRG + CannonDesign. With the addition of SRG’s Portland and Seattle studios, CannonDesign has expanded to 18 offices and nearly 1,300 teammates across North America and India.

== Controversies ==
In August 2016, CannonDesign reached an agreement with the Justice Department and the Department of Veterans Affairs to pay a $12 million settlement after it admitted to criminal conduct kickback scheme. Prior to the settlement, the former director of the Louis Stokes Cleveland VA Medical Center hospital and later the VA hospital in Dayton, Ohio, William Montague, was sentenced to prison for his role in giving insider information to contractors in exchange for money. CannonDesign executive Mark Farmer was also sentenced to prison for his involvement in the scheme.

== Notable awards and recognition ==
- 2018, Laboratory of the Year Winner, R&D Magazine
- 2019, Outstanding Organization of the Year, Healthcare Design Magazine
- 2019, One of 9 World Changing Companies, Fast Company
- 2019 & 2017, One of the 10 Most Innovative Architecture Firms in the World, Fast Company
- 2020, Design Firm of the Year, Engineering News-Record

== Selected projects ==
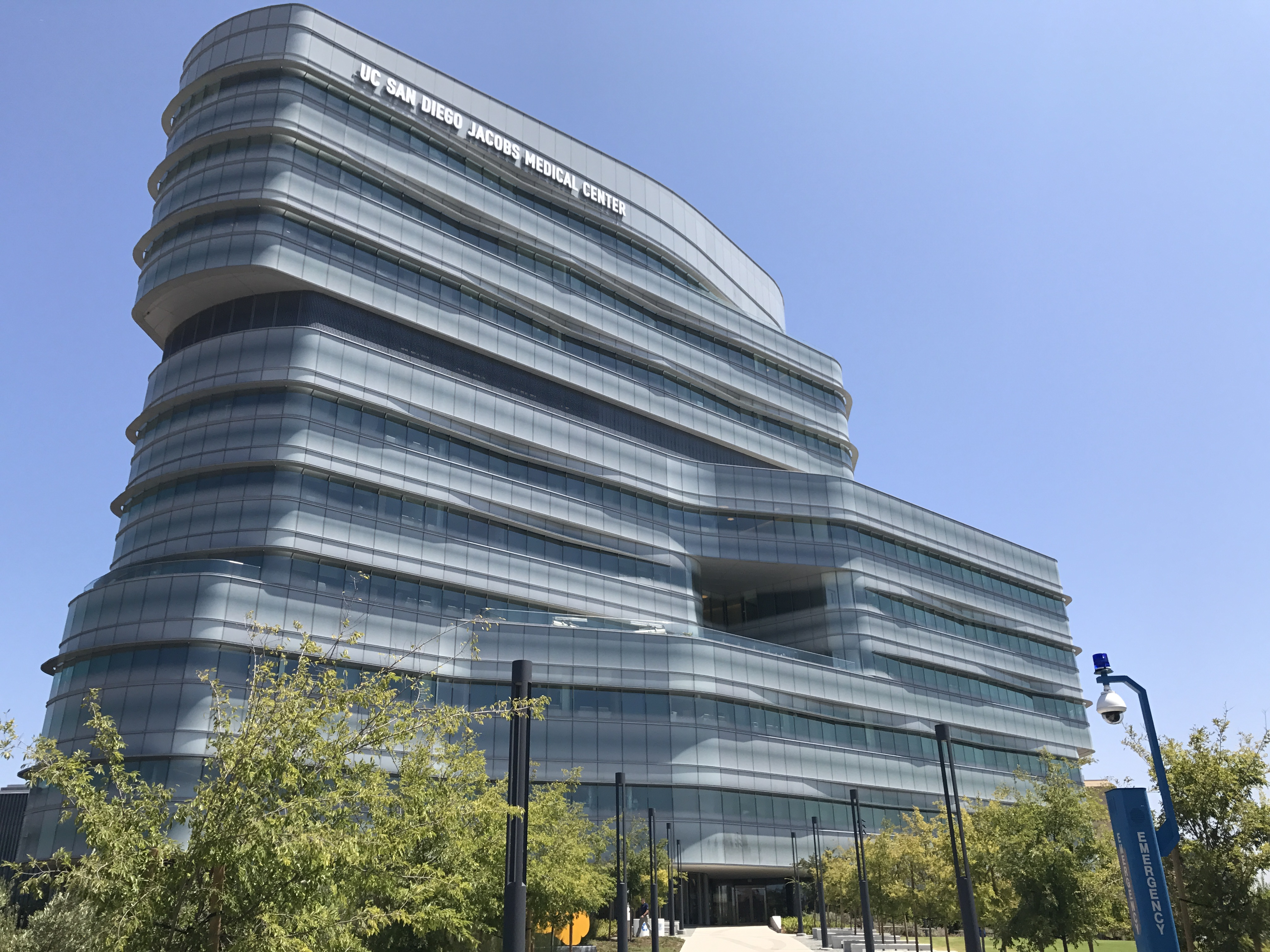
UC San Diego Health, Jacobs Medical Center.

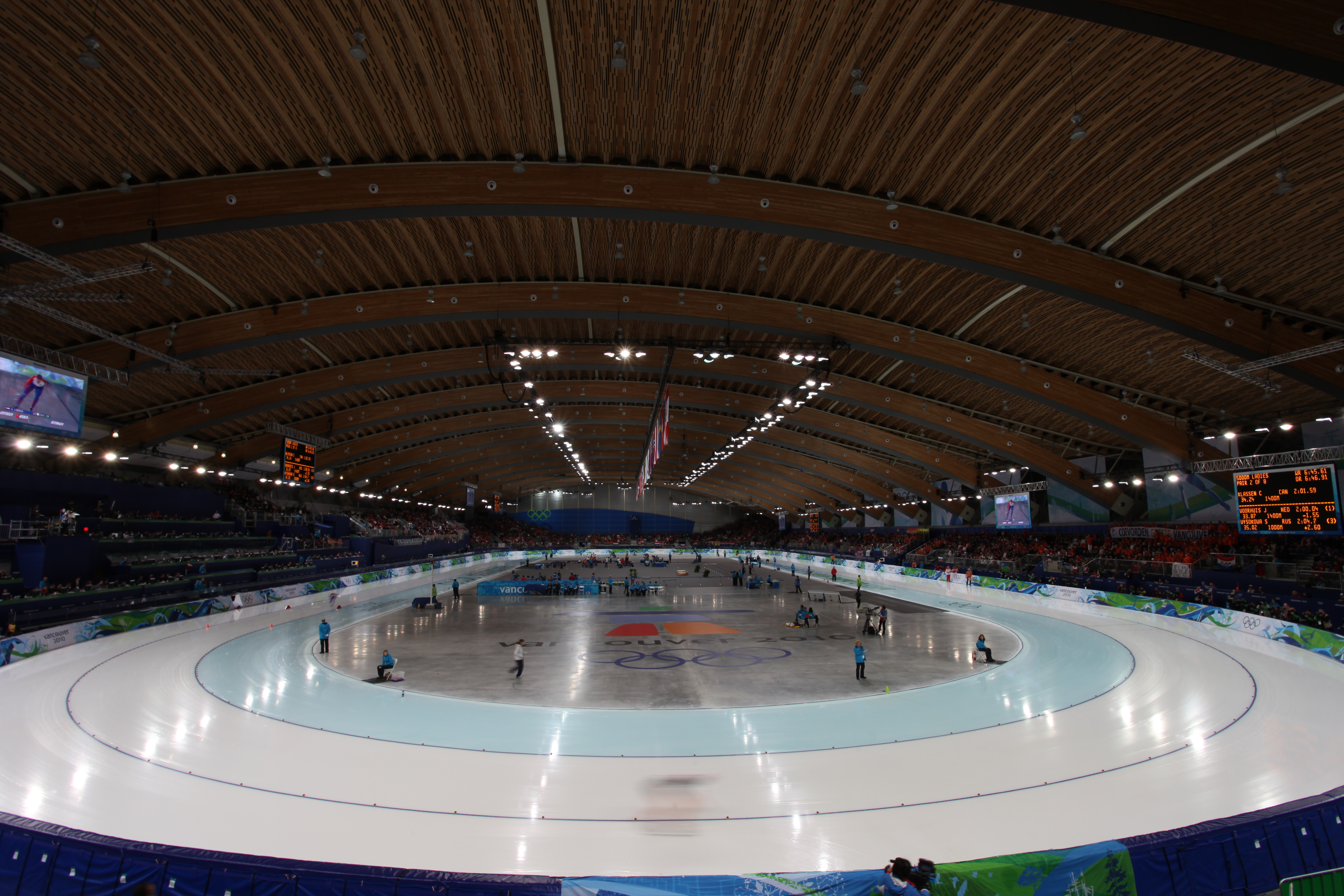
Richmond Olympic Oval.

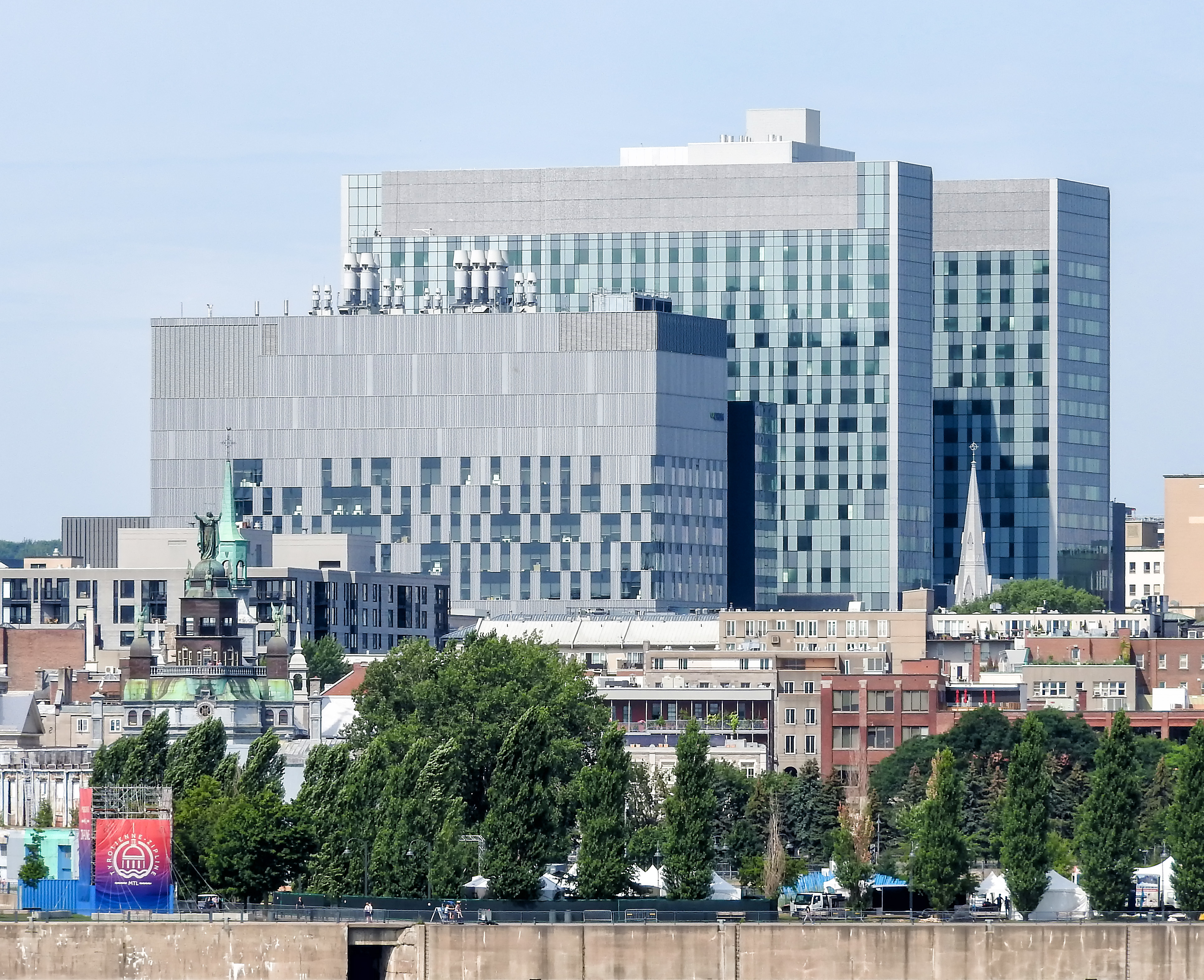
Centre hospitalier de l’Université de Montréal.

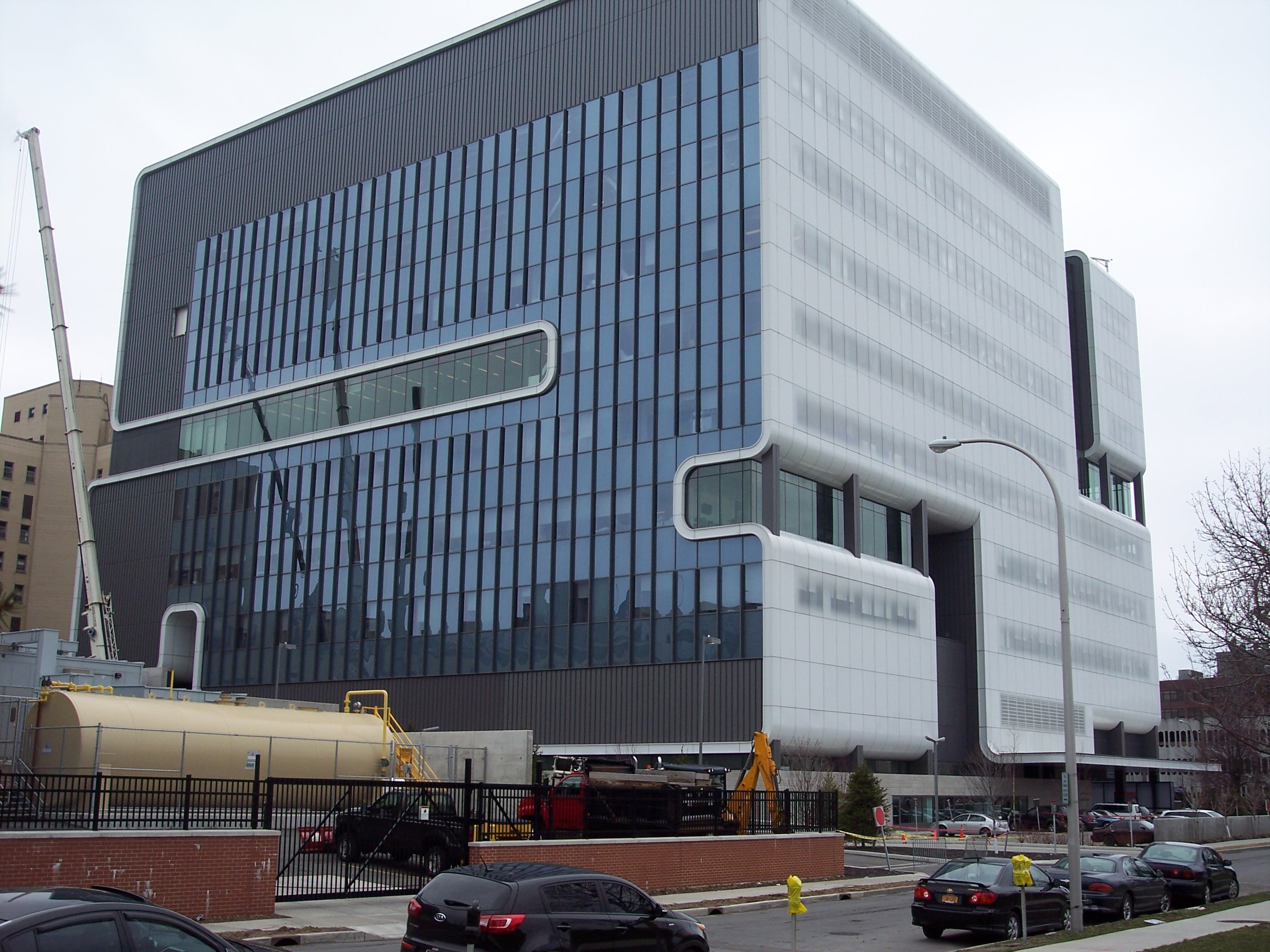
Gates Vascular Institute.

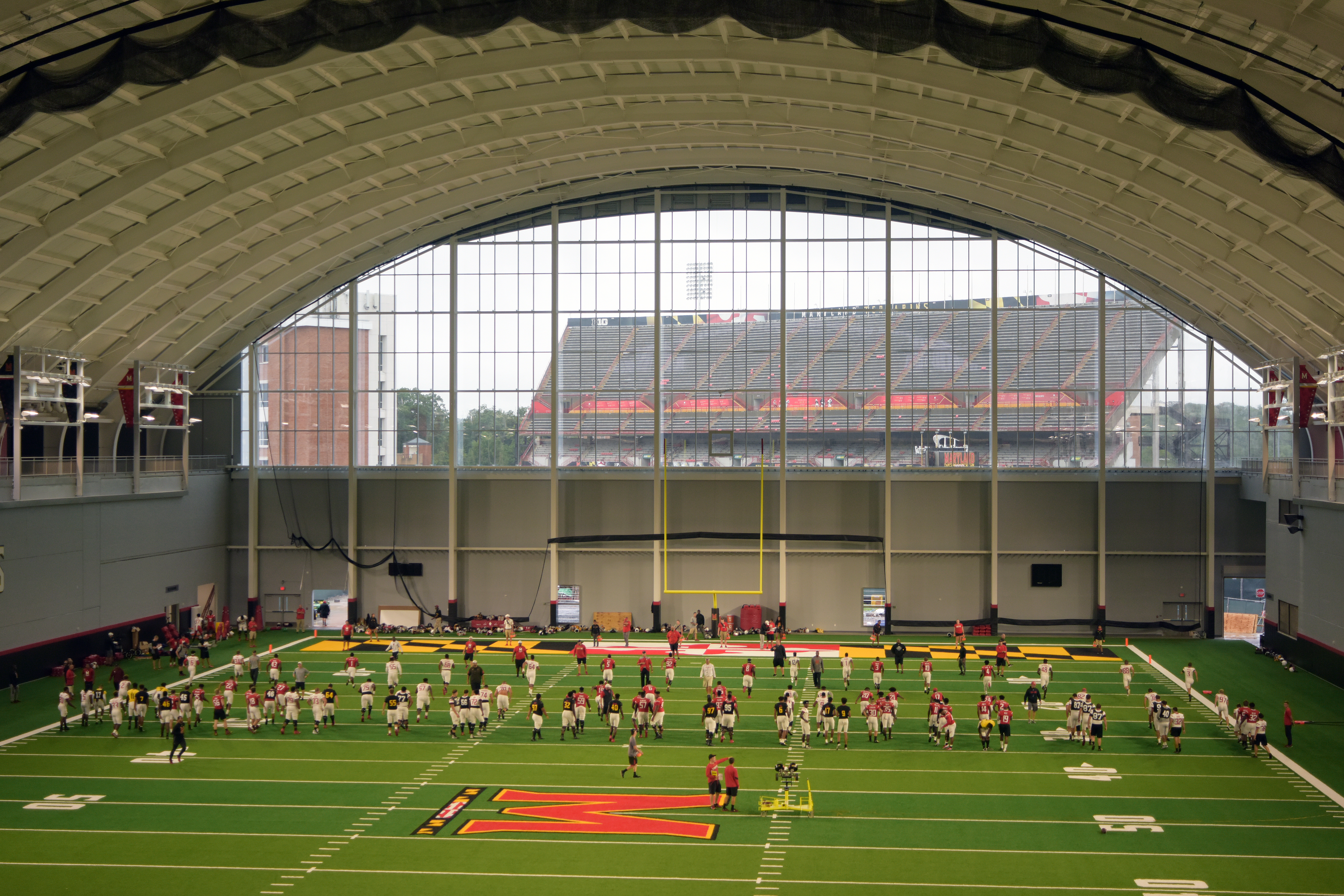
University of Maryland, New Cole Field House.

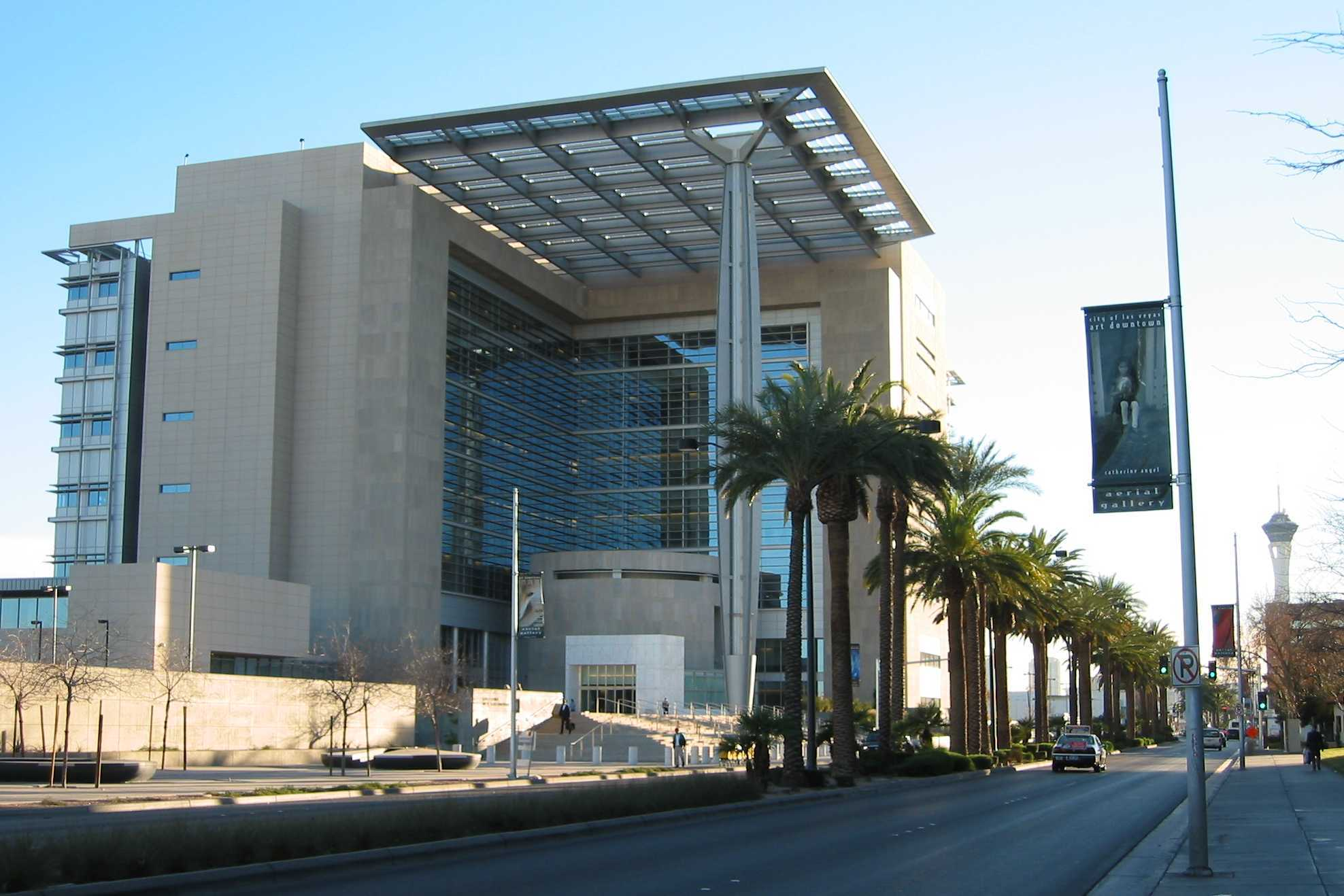
Lloyd D. George Federal District Courthouse.

=== Commercial ===
- 2012 Clorox New Pleasanton Campus
- 2015 Follett Corporation Headquarters Office Consolidation
- 2015 Lockton Companies Chicago Office Relocation
- 2015 Flexera Software Headquarters Relocation
- 2015 Zurich Insurance Group Headquarters
- 2017 Uber, Advanced Technology Group, Pittsburgh
- 2017 CJ Group, CJ Blossom Park
- 2019 Atlassian, Mountain View Office
- 2019 Showtime, West Coast Headquarters
- 2020 Upwork, Chicago Office Expansion

=== Education ===
- 2008 Texas Christian University, Brown Lupton University Union
- 2008 University of San Diego Price Center, renovation
- 2008 University of Chicago Law School, Library Tower
- 2014 University of Colorado Boulder, Student Recreation Center
- 2015 Coppin State University, Science and Technology Center
- 2015 Carnegie Mellon University, Cohon University Center Addition
- 2016 University of Utah Lassonde Studios
- 2017 Waukee Innovation and Learning Center
- 2018 York University, Second Student Centre
- 2018 University of Maryland Baltimore County, Event Center
- 2019 North Carolina A&T State University, Student Center
- 2019 Richard J. Daley College, Engineering + Advanced Manufacturing Center
- 2020 Ohlone Community College, Academic Core
- 2020 Kaiser Permanente Bernard J. Tyson School of Medicine

=== Healthcare ===
- 2010 Advocate Lutheran General Hospital
- 2011 Tata Medical Center
- 2012 Kaleida Health Gates Vascular Institute
- 2013 Cedars-Sinai Medical Center OR 360 Simulation Laboratory
- 2015 Kaiser Permanente Kraemer Radiation Oncology Center
- 2016 Children's Hospital of Philadelphia, Buerger Center for Advanced Pediatric Care
- 2016 UC San Diego Health, Jacobs Medical Center
- 2017 Centre hospitalier de l’Université de Montréal
- 2018 Texas Children's Hospital, Lester and Sue Smith Legacy Tower
- 2019 Nantucket Cottage Hospital
- 2019 Mount Sinai Medical Center (Miami), Skolnick Surgical Tower and Hildebrandt Emergency Center

=== Community ===
- 1977 Buffalo Metropolitan Transportation Center
- 2011 Louis Stokes Cleveland VA Medical Center
- 2012 Buffalo State College Science and Mathematics Complex
- 2012 Lloyd D. George Federal District Courthouse
- 2012 St. Louis Public Library
- 2013 Museum of Tolerance

=== Science and technology ===
- 1994 Volen Center for Complex Systems, Brandeis University
- 2008 Texas Children’s Hospital, Feigin Research Center
- 2011 Novartis Institutes for Biomedical Research 200 Technology Square (Cambridge, Massachusetts)
- 2015 Novartis-Penn, Center for Advanced Cellular Therapies
- 2016 Yale University Sterling Chemistry Lab Renovation
- 2017 Novartis Institutes for BioMedical Research, Cambridge Campus
- 2019 Vermont Agriculture & Environmental Laboratory
- 2021 Johns Hopkins University Applied Physics Laboratory, Building 201

=== Stadiums and sports facilities ===
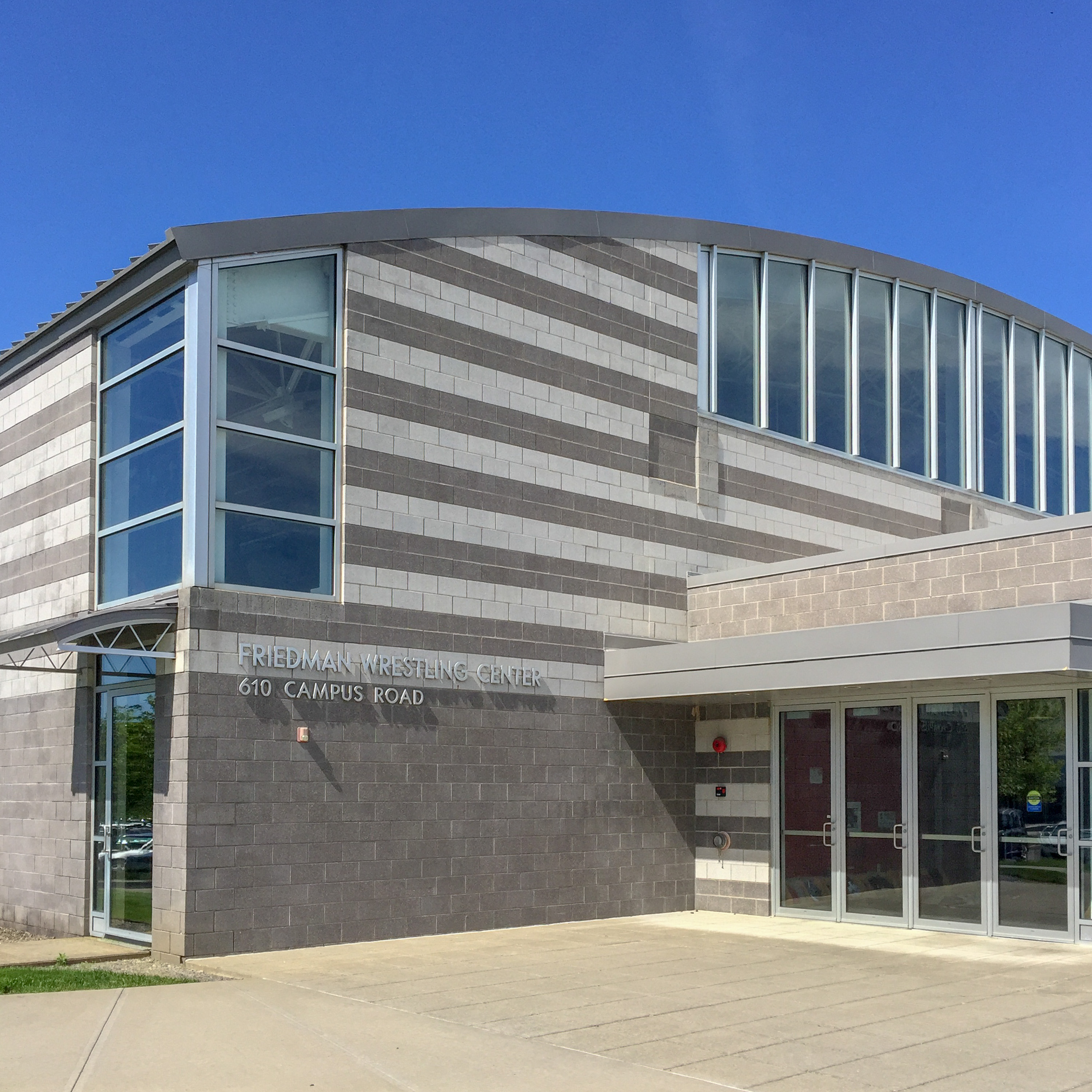
Friedman Wrestling Center at Cornell University

- 2000 Jenny Craig Pavilion
- 2003 Friedman Wrestling Center, Cornell University
- 2003 Curb Event Center
- 2008 Richmond Olympic Oval
- 2011 TD Place Stadium
- 2011 Jack Nicklaus Golf Club Korea
- 2012 Sports and Recreation Center, Worcester Polytechnic Institute
- 2015 Rafferty Stadium
- 2017 University of Maryland, New Cole Field House
- 2018 Place Bell (Laval, Quebec)
