= Center for Stem Cell and Regenerative Medicine =

Medical research organization

- Industry: Medical research
- Founded: Cleveland, Ohio, United States (2003)
- Founder: Case Western University, Cleveland Clinic, University Hospitals Case Medical Center, Athersys, Inc., Ohio State University, Ohio Third Frontier
- Headquarters: Cleveland, Ohio, United States
- Area served: North America

The Center for Stem Cell and Regenerative Medicine (CSCRM) is a medical research institution specializing in stem cell and other cell therapy research and treatments, located in Cleveland, Ohio. They specialize in basic and clinical research programs, biomedical and tissue engineering programs, and the development and administration of new therapies to patients.

== History ==
The CSCRM was founded in 2003 through funding by the state of Ohio. Its parent institution is the National Center for Regenerative Medicine. They have received over $33 million in funding from the state of Ohio since their inception. As of 2009, they had conducted over 50 clinical trials, treated over 300 patients, spun off four companies, and raised $235 million in venture capital.

== Stem cell bank ==
The center possesses a wide variety of stem cells, including ASC, CSC, CTP, ESC, HSC, HB1, iPS, MSC, MAPC, NSC, SKMB and UCB.
