= The Research Institute at Nationwide Children's Hospital =

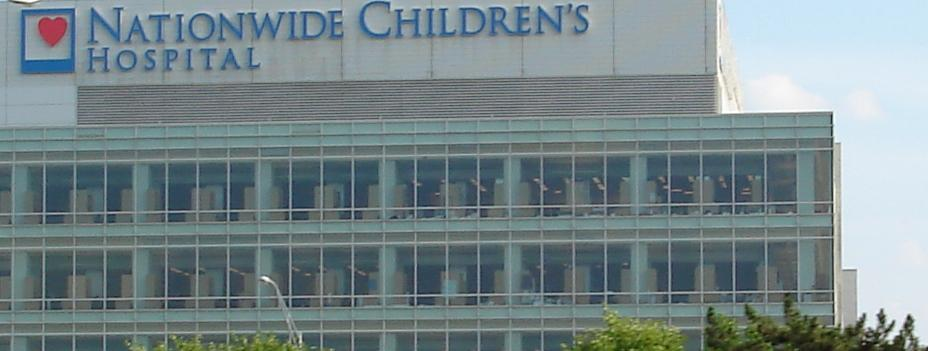
- Nationwide Children's Hospital

Geography
- Location: Nationwide Children's Hospital, Columbus, Ohio, United States
- Coordinates: 39.95242°N 82.979428°W

Links
- Website: The Research Institute at Nationwide Children's Hospital
- Lists: Hospitals in Ohio

The Research Institute at Nationwide Children's Hospital is one of America's ten largest free-standing pediatric research centers and works to enhance the health of children by engaging in research.

== History ==
=== Origins ===
Research at the Children's Hospital can be traced back to the founding in 1892. Following World War II, extensive resources were dedicated to research, which led to the first successful treatment of histoplasmosis by Dr. Warren Wheeler. Eventually the research conducted at the hospital would be consolidated under C-H-I-L-D, or Children’s Hospital Investigative Laboratory Division. In 1964, Children’s Hospital Research Foundation was founded. In 1998, The Children's Hospital Research Foundation became the Columbus Children's Research Institute. In 2007, following a gift from the Nationwide Foundation, it became The Research Institute at Nationwide Children's Hospital.

=== Medical firsts, breakthroughs, and contributions ===
The first successful treatment of histoplasmosis by Dr. Warren Wheeler occurred at the center in the mid-20th century. In 1965, the world's first rhinovirus reference center was established in Ross Hall at the Hospital. In the 1970s, research by the hospital contributed to an innovative therapy in the fight against Reye's Syndrome. In the 1980s, Dr. Samuel Mites created microvolume techniques for bloodwork and Dr. H. William Chatworthy pioneered pediatric surgeries by developing portosystemic shunt procedures. In the 1990s, Dr. Christopher Walker led a nationwide project on hepatitis C infection and immunobiology. In 2000, Dr. Robert Castile patented breakthrough technology, an "adult-type" infant pulmonary function testing device. In 2003, the research institute conducted HIV vaccine trials. In 2006, the first human gene therapy trial for muscular dystrophy was conducted at the research institute. In 2009, the institute again conducted trials for an HIV vaccine.

=== 2019 Rededication ===
In early 2019, the center was rededicated the Abigail Wexner Research Institute at Nationwide Children's Hospital, with corresponding new signage on all buildings.

=== Espionage ===
In August 2020 Li Chen pled guilty to stealing trade secrets and other intellectual property from the Research Institute at Nationwide Children's Hospital lab where she and her husband worked for ten years. Most of the stolen information related to exosomes and their therapeutic use. In return for bringing the technology to China she received benefits from the State Administration of Foreign Expert Affairs, National Natural Science Foundation of China, and multiple government talent acquisition plans.

== Research Centers ==
The Research Institute at Nationwide Children's Hospital is divided into 12 Centers of Emphasis.
