= Downtown Dayton =

- Central business district
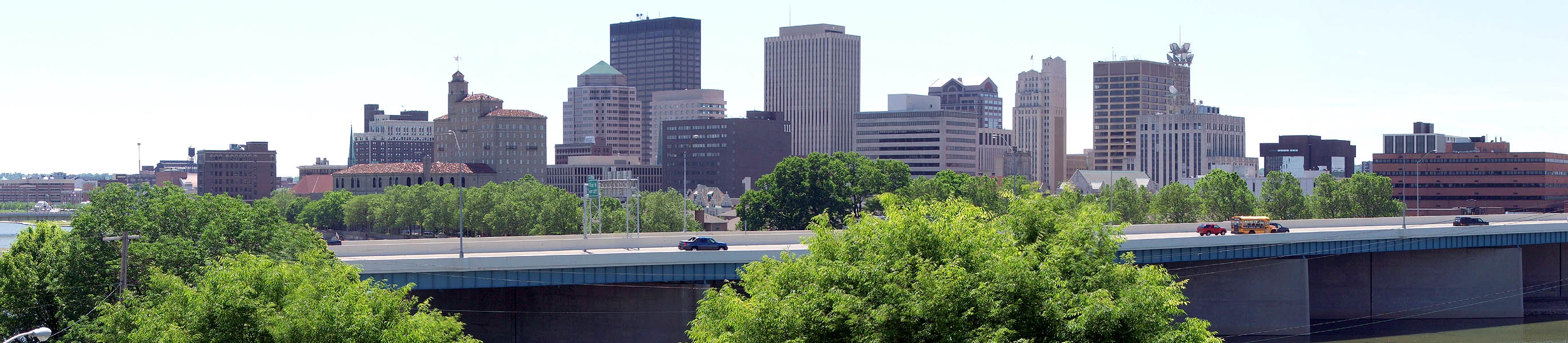
- Downtown Dayton in 2007
- Interactive map of Downtown Dayton
- Coordinates: 39°45′42″N 84°11′30″W
- City: Dayton
- State: Ohio
- Country: United States

Population (2,000)
  - Total: 2,009

Downtown Dayton is the central business district of Dayton, Ohio, United States. Major reinvestment in the downtown area began heavily in the mid-1990s, and continues today with $2 billion in residential, commercial, health, and transportation developments that has or is taking place in the downtown area.

While much of the city's population decamped to surrounding suburbs in the second half of the 20th century, downtown Dayton has begun to gain population again since the early 2000s with a 96-98 percent housing occupancy rate. Downtown Dayton is home to 42,000 employees, 2,000 residents, and more than 7 million yearly visitors. It is also becoming one of the most technology oriented and high-tech friendly downtowns in the United States.

== Education ==
Downtown is home to Sinclair Community College and the University of Dayton. Sinclair community college is the largest community college at a single location in Ohio and one of the largest community colleges in the nation. Sinclair is acclaimed as one of the country's best community colleges. Sinclair was founded as the YMCA college in 1887.

The University of Dayton is a private, Catholic institution. It is Ohio's largest private university and is one of the top 10 Catholic universities in the United States. UD is also home to the University of Dayton Research Institute which ranks second in the nation for sponsored research, and the Center for Tissue Regeneration and Engineering at Dayton which focuses on human tissue regeneration.

== Entertainment ==
Entertainment in the downtown Dayton area is diverse. Downtown is home to the Dayton Art Institute which is a museum of fine arts that owns collections containing more than 20,000 objects spanning 5,000 years of art and archaeological history. The Dayton Art Institute was rated one of the top 10 best art museums in the United States for children. Along with the Dayton Art Institute, there are also other arts in the downtown area. The Dayton Region ranked 33rd in the nation out of 373 metropolitan areas in arts and culture.

The Benjamin and Marian Schuster Performing Arts Center in downtown Dayton is a world-class performing arts center and the home venue of the Dayton Philharmonic Orchestra, Dayton Opera, and the Dayton Ballet. In addition to Philharmonic and Opera performances, the Schuster Center hosts concerts, lectures, traveling Broadway shows, and is a popular spot for weddings, and other events. The historic Victoria Theatre, located in downtown Dayton, hosts concerts, traveling Broadway shows, ballet, a summertime classic film series, and more. The Loft Theatre, also located downtown, is the home of the Human Race Theatre Company.

Downtown Dayton is the home of the Dayton Ballet, one of the oldest professional dance companies in the United States. The Company runs the Dayton Ballet School, the oldest dance school in Dayton and one of the oldest in the country. It is the only ballet school in the Miami Valley associated with a professional dance company. Additionally, Dayton is home to the Gem City Ballet and Progressive Dance Theater, companies in residence at the Pontecorvo Ballet Studio.

The Oregon District is a historic residential and commercial district in southeast downtown Dayton. The district is populated with art galleries, specialty shops, pubs, nightclubs, and coffee houses. Not far from the Oregon District is the PNC Second Street Market a public market owned by Five Rivers MetroParks.

=== Nightlife ===
Downtown Dayton is home to over 70 nightclubs and over 130 restaurants/bars. Most of the nightlife is concentrated near the Oregon District, Fire Blocks District, and around the Ballpark (Webster Station). Downtown Dayton has an eclectic choice of sports bars, raves, lounges, pubs, musical bars, and holes in the wall. The Fire Blocks District is home to four LGBT friendly clubs and businesses. There are many local bands that play at pubs and musical bars in the Oregon District as well.

=== Sports ===
Downtown Dayton is host to the Dayton Dragons baseball team, and the Dayton Flyers NCAA division one basketball team. The Dayton Dragons is Dayton's only professional baseball team and is the minor league affiliate for the Cincinnati Reds. The Dayton Dragons are the first (and only) team in minor league baseball history to sell out an entire season before it began and was voted as one of the top ten hottest tickets to get in all of professional sports by Sports Illustrated.

The Dayton Flyers play at The University of Dayton Arena, which hosted 82 games in the NCAA men's basketball tournament over its history, making it the second most prolific venue in NCAA history and the most prolific among active venues, with the most recent being first and second round games of the 2017 tournament.

== Recent developments ==
CareSource Management Group in 2009, completed construction of a $55 million corporate headquarters at the corner of Main Street and Monument Avenue in downtown Dayton. The 300,000-square-foot (28,000 m^{2}), 10-story building marks downtown's first new office tower in more than a decade. Along with this construction was built a new seven-floor parking garage that accommodates 1,200 vehicles. The facility represents an investment downtown of approximately $20 million. Since NCR vacated its world headquarters near downtown Dayton, the University of Dayton Research Institute announced that they would be relocating to the former National Cash Register world headquarters building. The former HQ and the surrounding land came under acquisition of the University of Dayton at a purchase price of $18 million.

Downtown Dayton has also seen numerous residential developments, most notably in the Water Street District announced in mid-2013. Transportation projects in Downtown Dayton have also been on the rise. The Ohio Department of Transportation is currently in the process of $533 million of construction to modify and reconstruct I-75 through downtown Dayton. ODOT is upgrading and widening I-75 from Edwin C Moses Blvd. to Stanley Avenue. Many downtown bridges are also being upgraded.

In 2010, the Greater Downtown Dayton Plan was announced. The Plan represents a vision for Dayton's center city that focuses on strengthening connections and creating a downtown attractive to investors, businesses, employees, residents, students and visitors. This vision focuses on the potential of Greater Downtown to become an authentic urban center and the catalyst for Dayton's regional economy. The plan focuses on housing opportunities, and creating an inviting environment for businesses to relocate and stay in the downtown area. The plan will also home in on what makes downtown Dayton unique and build on it. This includes downtown arts, sports, health care, and entertainment. Face-lifts and improvements such as gateway projects, repaving, and upgrading building facades are also part of the plan.
