= David Dusing =

American musician (1943–2014)

David H. Dusing (March 22, 1943 – May 14, 2014) was an American composer, arranger, conductor, and tenor. He is best remembered for his long term partnership with composer and music satirist Peter Schickele with whom he performed and toured regularly from 1990 through 2008.

Raised in Toledo, Ohio, Dusing was trained as a singer and choral conductor at Mount Union College and the New England Conservatory (NEC). After initially working as a music educator for Minerva Local School District he joined the faculty of the NEC where he taught conducting and directed choirs from 1970 to 1973. He began his career as a tenor during these years; performing frequently in cantatas by Bach conducted by Craig Smith at Emmanuel Episcopal Church, Boston and performing as a soloist in oratorios under conductors like Robert Shaw.

Dusing left his position at NEC to join the vocal sextet Songs by Six with who he toured from 1973 until 1975. He then performed as a member of the Robert De Cormier Singers into the late 1980s. He simultaneously maintained a solo career as a concert tenor and occasional musical theatre actor. In 1984 he founded his own choir, the Dusing Singers, with whom he periodically toured and recorded into the 1990s. He succeeded Norman Luboff as conductor of the Norman Luboff Choir in 1986.

Dusing lived in New York City where he was a frequent collaborator with director and choreographer Nat Horne. From 1992 until 2010 the two men spent two months of each year in Dayton, Ohio, co-staging annual musicals for Muse Machine with Dusing also serving as musical director.

== Early life and education ==
The son of Ernest and Ida Mae Dusing, David Henry Dusing was born in Pemberville, Ohio, on March 22, 1943. He was educated in the Toledo City School District at Arlington Elementary School and Libbey High School; graduating from the latter institution in 1961. He studied music at Mount Union College (MUC) in Alliance, Ohio. There he starred in a student production of Douglas Moore's The Devil and Daniel Webster in 1962, and that same year was elected vice-president of the Mount Union College Choir. He was elected president of the choir in 1963, and was also a singer in the school's Madrigal Singers. He was also active in the Phi Mu Alpha Sinfonia fraternity at the school.

After graduating from MUC in 1966 with both Bachelor of Music and Bachelor of Music Education degrees, Dusing worked as a music teacher for Minerva Local School District where he was director of the choir at Minerva High School. He simultaneously worked as a graduate assistant at the New England Conservatory (NEC) while pursuing a Masters's degree in choral conducting. On July 1, 1967 he married Cathy Frase at Christ Presbyterian Church in Canton, Ohio. Their marriage ended in divorce in 1975.

== Career ==
=== Tenor and choral music leader ===
After graduating from the NEC with a master's degree, Dusing joined the faculty of that conservatory where he taught conducting and conducted choirs. He worked as a resident tenor soloist at Emmanuel Episcopal Church, Boston where he performed regularly as soloist in Bach cantatas led by Craig Smith; among them Lobet Gott in seinen Reichen, BWV 11. In 1970 he sang the lead tenor role of the Evangelist in Johann Sebastian Bach's St Matthew Passion under the baton on Robert Shaw at the Blossom Festival; a work presented in honor of the late George Szell who had recently died. In 1971 he was the tenor soloist in Giacomo Carissimi's oratorio Jephte in a concert given at Bates College, and that same year was the tenor soloist in Mozart's Requiem with the Concord Chorale. He was also a tenor vocalist on George Russell's 1971 jazz album Listen to the Silence.

In the Summer of 1972 Dusing toured Europe for seven weeks as a member of the New England Conservatory's choir in a concert tour funded by the United States Department of State. He performed the aria "Un'aura amorosa" from Mozart's Così fan tutte in a concert of opera arias at Harvard University's Sanders Theatre in August 1973. On Labor Day 1976 he was the tenor soloist in the premiere of Morton Gould's cantata Something to Do: A Salute to the American Worker at the John F. Kennedy Center for the Performing Arts; a work which also starred Pearl Bailey and was commissioned to celebrate the United States Bicentennial. In 1977 he was the tenor soloist in a recording of Malcolm Peyton's Chamber Cantata. He also worked as a guest soloist in concerts with Harry Belafonte and John Raitt.

Dusing toured in the vocal sextet Songs by Six from 1973 until 1975; resigning from his position at the NEC when he joined this group. The ensemble was organized and directed by Robert De Cormier who also wrote the group's arrangements of both popular and classical music. He then performed as a member of the professional choir, the Robert De Cormier Singers (RDCS), in the late 1970s and 1980s. He also conducted the RDCS when De Cormier was not able to lead the ensemble. He was still a member of this ensemble as late as 1988.

Dusing founded the choir, the Dusing Singers (DS; also known as the David Dusing Ensemble). The group was actively performing in concert series as early as the Spring of 1984. The choral group toured periodically in the 1980s and 1990s. This included a Christmas concert presented in conjunction with the RDCS at The Church of the Holy Trinity in 1989. In 1991 the DS released the album The Cool Of The Day: The Music Of Jean Ritchie which featured the ensemble performing vocal arrangement's of Jean Ritchie's music by Dusing. The DS also recorded music for the soundtrack of the 1995 film Dead Man Walking. Dusing also performed as a member of the Norman Luboff Choir and succeeded Luboff as the ensemble's conductor in the last months of his life. Following Luboff's death in September 1987, he conducted the choir on a concert tour to Australia in November 1987. He also served as chorus master for Peter Sellars's stagings of Così fan tutte (1986) and Don Giovanni (1987) in New York.

Dusing also occasionally worked in musical theatre. In 1979 he was a featured singer in Radio City Music Hall's stage adaptation of the 1937 Disney animated film Snow White and the Seven Dwarfs. After this he portrayed Sir Lionel in a national tour of Camelot. In 1986 he starred as Seryozha in Stanley Silverman's musical revue The Black Sea Follies featuring the music of Dmitri Shostakovich which was staged in a co-production by the Music-Theatre Group of Brooklyn and the Lenox Arts Center of Massachusetts. After a run at the Lenox Arts Center, the production was performed Off-Broadway in New York at Playwrights Horizons.

In 1987 Dusing was the tenor soloist in Bach's Christ lag in Todes Banden, BWV 4, Anton Bruckner's Requiem, and Mozart's Mass in D major, K. 194 with the Richmond Choral Society (RCS). He performed with the RCS again in 1988 as a soloist in Beethoven's Mass in C major. In 1992 he was a guest performer on Garrison Keillor's American Radio Company program.

=== Work with Nat Horne ===
Dusing moved to New York City where he was a frequent collaborator with director and choreographer Nat Horne. He taught voice on the faculty of the Nat Horne Musical Theatre School. With Glen Vecchione he co-authored the music and lyrics to the Off-Off-Broadway musical The Legend of Frankie and Johnny which was staged in New York City by the Nat Horne Musical Theatre. It opened on April 10, 1981 and closed after 38 performances. The production was directed Albert Reyes and choreographed by Horne. It toured the United States after the end of its New York run.

Dusing was the longtime music director for Muse Machine's (MM) annual musical theatre productions staged at the Victoria Theatre in Dayton, Ohio; often also serving as the co- stage director with Nat Horne. The first production he served as music director for MM was Rodgers and Hammerstein's South Pacific in 1992. He served as music director and co-stage director for MM's productions of Oliver! (1993), Moose Charlap and Jule Styne's Peter Pan (1994 and 2008), The Music Man (1995), The Wizard of Oz (1996), Me and My Girl (1997 and 2009), Mame (1998), Damn Yankees (1999) My Favorite Year (2000) My Fair Lady (2001), The Pajama Game (2002), Guys and Dolls (2003), How to Succeed in Business Without Really Trying (2004), On the Town (2005), Beauty and the Beast (2006), Thoroughly Modern Millie (2007), and Singin' in the Rain (2010).

In 1997 Dusing spearheaded the recording of an album, Broadway In Concert, which featured the performers of the Muse Machine in excerpts from musicals that he had led with the company. He also conducted a series of summer musical revues presented by the Muse Machine in Dayton entitled Heart and Music.

=== Collaborations with Peter Schickele ===
Dusing was a frequent collaborator with music satirist and composer Peter Schickele; frequently appearing with him in concerts and cabaret programs. The pair also frequently partnered with soprano Michèle Eaton in the various programs they crafted.

Some of the venues Dusing and Schickele appeared in concert at included the Emelin Theatre (1990), the Daniels Pavilion in Naples, Florida (1990), Ford Hall at Ithaca College (1990), the Bearsville Theater (1990), Simon's Rock at Bard College (1992), Plymouth Church, Des Moines, Iowa (1992), the Mount Gretna Playhouse (1992), the Fargo Theatre (1992), the Galvin Fine Arts Center (1993), Pennington Presbyterian Church (1995), the Metropolitan Performing Arts Center (1995), the OK Mozart Festival (1996), the Glenn Gould Studio (1996), Binghamton University (1996), College of St. Scholastica (1996), St. Philip's in the Hills Episcopal Church (1997), the Merrill Auditorium (1997), the John Harms Theatre (1997), the Ed Landreth Auditorium (1997), the Inter-Media Art Center (1999), the 92nd Street Y (1999), Joseph Meyerhoff Symphony Hall (1999), Manoa Valley Theatre (1999), the Bowker Auditorium (1999), the Ann Arbor Summer Festival (2000), Carnegie Music Hall (2001), the John Harms Center (2001), Powell Hall (2001), the Maine Center for the Arts (2001), The Bushnell Center for the Performing Arts (2001), the Caramoor Center for Music and the Arts (2002), the Weidner Center for the Performing Arts (2004), Monmouth University (2004), Appalachian State University (2004), the Braden Auditorium (2005), the Pearce Auditorium (2005), the Cerritos Center for the Performing Arts (2005), Alice Pratt Brown Hall (2005), Howard Performing Arts Center (2007), the Society of the Four Arts (2007), the Peggy and Yale Gordon Center For Performing Arts (2007), and the Winspear Centre (2008).

In 1997 he performed a musical parody concert with Peter Schickele at the Cleveland Museum of Art to raise funds for the Cleveland Music School Settlement. In 2000 Dusing portrayed the role of the mysterious writer Peter Schafler in Schickle's A Little Nightmare Music with the New Jersey Symphony Orchestra (NJSO); a work which gave an alternative humorous account of the relationship between Mozart and Antonio Salieri. In 2001 Schickele and Dusing performed in concert with the Chicago Symphony Orchestra led by William Eddins at Symphony Center; and later had a return engagement with the orchestra in 2004 with the CSO led by Alastair Willis. In April 2001 they performed in concert with the Philadelphia Orchestra led by Rossen Milanov at the Academy of Music. Other orchestras the pair performed with included the Reno Philharmonic Orchestra (2002), the California Symphony (2002), the Orlando Philharmonic Orchestra (2002), the San Diego Symphony (2003) the Madison Symphony Orchestra (2003), the Utah Symphony (2003), and the Waterloo-Cedar Falls Symphony Orchestra (2007).

In June 2003 Schickele and Dusing were guests on NPR's Wait Wait... Don't Tell Me!. In July 2005 and July 2007 they performed on A Prairie Home Companion in a special live broadcasts from the Tanglewood Music Festival.

== Death ==
Dusing suffered from Parkinson's disease in the last years of his life. He died at his home in New York City on May 14, 2014 at the age of 71.
