= Nat Horne =

American dance educator and dancer

Nathaniel Augustus Horne (born December 20, 1929) is an American dancer, choreographer, theatre director, and dance educator. A native of Richmond, Virginia, he graduated from Virginia Union University in 1951 with a degree in mathematics. Against the wishes of his father, a Baptist minister, he pursued a career as a dancer, initially working as both a dancer and choreographer in the Eighth Army division of the Special Services branch in Europe from 1952 to 1954. Upon returning to the United States he moved to New York City where he trained as a dancer under Matt Mattox, among others. He danced with Aubrey Hitchens's Negro Dance Theatre prior to having a distinguished career on Broadway as a dancer in musicals from 1957 to 1970. He was an original member of the Alvin Ailey American Dance Theater, and performed in the world premieres of several of Ailey's early works, among them the seminal modern dance work Revelations.

Horne mainly retired from performance after 1970, re-orienting his career towards choreography and teaching. He was a long-time teacher of jazz dance at the Ailey School, joining the faculty in 1971. He began his shift toward choreographic work in 1963 at the Jones Beach Theatre, and then worked in Germany as a choreographer for several musical production in the 1960s. In 1969 he formed an artistic partnership with the director Albert Reyes with whom he worked on several musicals in regional theatre and stock theatre as a choreographer into the mid-1970s. In 1973 Reyes and Horne began teaching theatre workshops with an emphasis on training dancers to act and sing as well as move. The success of these workshops led the men to found the Nat Horne Musical Theatre and School (NHMTS) in Theatre Row on 42nd Street in 1975. The school portion of the NHMTS trained many Broadway performers during its eleven-year existence. The NHMTS also operated the Off-Off Broadway Nat Horne Theatre which remained active after the school closed. It was still operational as late as 1994.

After Reyes's death in 1992, Horne formed a close working relationship with the conductor, composer, and tenor David Dusing who had worked for Horne at the NHMTS as a voice teacher. Together the two men co-directed annual musicals for Muse Machine at the Victoria Theatre in Dayton, Ohio, from 1992 to 2010. As of 2024, Horne resides in Hell's Kitchen, Manhattan, where he has lived for more than 60 years.

== Early life and education ==
Nathaniel "Nat" Horne was born in Richmond, Virginia, on December 20, 1929. He was the third son of five born to Reverend Jacob Jesse Earl Horne and his wife Alice Irma Davis Horne (known by her middle name Irma). His father was a Baptist minister and evangelist who was predominantly active in rural areas outside Richmond. His brother J. Robinson Horne became a playwright of religious stage works, a theater critic, and director. Robinson and Nat had a very close relationship, and the two brothers shared an enthusiasm for dance and musical theatre. In their youth the two brothers would often try to recreate dances together that they saw in films.

Nat's original interest in becoming a dancer was instigated by watching Gene Kelly perform in musical films as a child. His father's religious beliefs made him opposed to dancing, and Nat began studying dance secretly in his youth by sneaking out of Saturday night prayer meetings to attend classes in the Richmond studio of African American teacher Mrs. Frances Hill Carter. He was eventually caught by his father while rehearsing for a stage adaptation of the fairy tale Beauty and the Beast at the local YMCA, a work directed by Carter, who was the wife of pastor and politician Matthew G. Carter. Mrs. Carter successfully convinced Nat's father to allow him to continue in the production without punishment, and he was able to study openly after his father saw the play and recognized his gift.

Racial segregation in the United States impacted Horne's childhood: the majority of dance education opportunities in Richmond were only available to white children. This limited his early development as a dancer. Most of Horne's training under Carter was concentrated on the execution of dance lifts as a partner to the female students in her studio, and it was not until his time in New York that he received a more thorough grounding in dance technique. Under Carter's direction, Horne performed in several productions of fairy tales put on by the Dance Guild of the Leigh Street YMCA and the Phyllis Wheatley Branch YWCA. Nat's brother Robinson also studied dance with Carter, and the two brothers would occasionally perform in routines together in her studio's productions.

Carter left Richmond while Nat was in high school, and after this he began performing in dances in the city with Mary Stewart Price. The dance pair starred in the revue Tan Town Topics staged by the YMCA at the Altria Theater. In 1947 he graduated from Armstrong High School in his native city, where one of his fellow students was future governor of Virginia Douglas Wilder. While a student there he danced in school productions, and continued to do the same while a student at Virginia Union University (VUU). Many of the shows he appeared in at VUU were created by his brother, Robinson, the most successful being Mayday of 1950. His dance partners at VUU included Zenoiba Carter and Mary Price. He graduated from VUU with a Bachelor of Science in mathematics in 1951. His studies in math were a departure from his family's original expectation that he train to be a minister at VUU.

== War service and move to New York ==
In 1952 Horne was drafted into the United States Army during the Korean War, and served for two years. He was initially assigned to Camp Breckinridge where he received basic training as part of the Eighth Army. He was originally destined for the officer candidate school because of his background as a college graduate. However, he wanted to be assigned to the Special Services (SS) branch in order to pursue his ambitions to become a dancer. He succeeded in obtaining a recommendation letter for this branch after performing at an officer's club in Richmond which he presented to a sympathetic commanding officer at his assigned post in Germany. That officer had him audition for the head of the United Service Organizations who in turn sent a letter to the head of the SS branch in Stuttgart where he was ultimately assigned.

Horne was the first Black American to join the Special Services as an official member. He spent his war service working as both a dancer and choreographer of shows for the SS, crafting jazz, African, and Cuban dance works for touring productions. He performed as a dancer in shows throughout Germany, France, Austria, Switzerland, and in London. His military service ended in 1954 and he returned to the United States where his family wanted him to settle in Richmond as a school teacher. Against their wishes, he left without informing his family for New York City in order to pursue a career as a dancer, settling there in 1954.

Horne originally worked as an order clerk in New York while taking dance lessons; during this time he predominantly lived off of oatmeal. He originally studied ballet in New York with Orest Sergievsky in 1954, followed by studies with Elna Laun and John Gregory in modern jazz dance and further ballet studies with Aubrey Hitchins. Because he was unable to afford the cost of lessons he would clean dance studios in exchange for being allowed to study. He maintained a rigorous schedule of working every day and studying dance for three hours every night. He also trained at Jacob's Pillow in Massachusetts, and later studied jazz dance with Jack Cole and both jazz and ballet with Matt Mattox, choreographers who shaped his own dance pedagogy when he later became a dance teacher. He studied with Mattox from 1956 to 1964, and also with Walter Nicks in the late 1950s.

== Dance career ==
At the age of 26, Horne obtained his first professional contract performing as a dancer in a revue at Club Harlem in Atlantic City, New Jersey. Not long after he appeared in the Orest Varieties, a dance revue crafted by his teacher Orest Sergievsky, at Carnegie Hall, a production which toured to Connecticut. He also portrayed the featured dancing role of Howard the Butler in Queens College, City University of New York's production of Finian's Rainbow. In 1955 he became a member of the all-male Negro Dance Theatre (NGT, founded by his teacher Aubrey Hitchens) with fellow dancers including Charles Moore and Bernard Johnson. With this group he performed in three ballets at Jacob's Pillow, notably as a principal dancer in Dania Krupska's "Outlook for Three". The NGT repertoire also included two classical ballets by Hitchens set to the music of Bach's Italian Concerto and Franz Liszt's Les Préludes.

In 1956 Horne portrayed the gambler "Balloon Cheeks" in the 1956 New York City Center revival of Carmen Jones with Muriel Smith in the title role. After the close of the New York run he toured with the production to Washington, D.C.'s Carter Barron Amphitheatre. In 1957 he made his Broadway debut as featured dancer in Harold Arlen and Yip Harburg's Jamaica starring Lena Horne. When that show temporarily closed in the summer of 1958 he toured to San Juan, Puerto Rico, with the Walter Nicks Ballet Company. Also in the cast was a young Alvin Ailey, and it is possible that it is through this production that Horne and Ailey met.

Horne became an original member of the Alvin Ailey American Dance Theater when it was founded in 1958, appearing in the troupe's inaugural performance at the 92nd Street Y. One of Ailey's early original dances featuring Horne was "Blues Suite" in which he danced the role of The Other Man opposite Ailey and Minnie Marshall, performing the work at its premiere on March 30, 1958. Another early Ailey dance he was featured in was "Canto al Diablo" (1960). On January 31, 1960, he performed in the world premiere of Ailey's seminal work Revelations as a principal dancer in the numbers "Wade in the Water" and "Sinner Man" in addition to the ensemble numbers. The following May he performed with the company in that work at the Apollo Theater. In 1962 he performed as a principal dancer in the world premieres of Ailey's "Been Here and Gone" (January 26, 1962) and "Creation of the World" (September 9, 1962), also filming the latter work for television broadcast on the Camera Three anthology series.

Horne worked regularly on Broadway as dancer for thirteen years. His other Broadway credits included work as a dancer in Saratoga (1959, Winter Garden Theatre), Finian's Rainbow (1960, New York City Center), Show Boat (1961, New York City Center), Sophie (1963, Winter Garden Theatre), What Makes Sammy Run? (1964, 54th Street Theatre), Golden Boy (1964, Majestic Theatre), and Illya Darling (1967, Mark Hellinger Theatre). He also portrayed the parts of the Ambassador in I'm Solomon (1968, Mark Hellinger Theatre), Panayotis in Zorba (1968–1969, Imperial Theatre), Horace Vandergelder in Hello, Dolly! (1969), and one of the musicians in Applause (1970, Palace Theatre).

Horne also worked in regional theatre. In 1961 he created the role of Teo in the premiere of A. E. Hotchner's A Short Happy Life at the Moore Theatre in Seattle; a production which starred Nan Martin and which toured to Los Angeles. In 1968 he performed in South Pacific at the Jones Beach Theatre (JBT) with Kathleen Nolan as Nellie and Jerome Hines as Emile. He had earlier worked as a dancer in the JBT production of Paradise Island (1961 and 1962).

Horne was a dancer in the 1960 television special Belafonte, New York 19, a tribute to Manhattan starring Harry Belafonte. He also appeared on television that year as a dancer in a filmed lecture given by choreographer Matt Mattox. His other television credits in the 1960s included performances on The Ed Sullivan Show and The Sammy Davis Jr. Show.

== Early work as choreographer and dance educator ==
Having previously worked as a choreographer during his military service, Horne returned to that work in 1963 when he served as June Taylor's assistant choreographer for a production of Sig Herzig and Sammy Fain's Around the World in 80 Days at the Jones Beach Theater. It was produced by Guy Lombardo, directed by Arnold Spector, and starred Elaine Malbin, Fritz Weaver, and Robert Clary. In 1964 he choreographed a production of the musical Girl Crazy which was staged in Dusseldorf, Germany. He obtained the position of choreographer after being asked by Matt Mattox to replace him in the post. He subsequently choreographed productions of Cabaret and West Side Story in Germany. In July 1976 his dance work "Old Movies & New Friends" was given five performances at the New York Public Library for the Performing Arts; he was also a principal dancer.

Horne had a longtime collaborative partnership with playwright and director Albert Reyes. This partnership began in 1969 when they began working on musicals in stock theatre together with Reyes as stage director and Horne as choreographer. Some of the stock theatre shows they worked on in their early years working together included productions of Anything Goes, 1776, and West Side Story. In 1974 they staged the Virginia Museum Theatre's (VMT) production of Purlie. Horne, without Reyes returning as director, choreographed the VMT's 1975 production of Guys and Dolls.

By 1965 Horne was teaching dance in New York City on the staff of the Clark Center for the Performing Arts. By 1971 he had joined the faculty of the New American Dance Center (better known as the Ailey School), teaching classes in jazz dance. He taught dance workshops at Radford College among other universities beginning in the 1970s. In the summer of 1979 he taught on the faculty of the International Summer Academy of Dance in Cologne.

== Nat Horne Musical Theatre and School ==
In 1975 Horne and Reyes co-founded the Nat Horne Musical Theatre and School (NHMTS). The origins of this organization dated to two years earlier when Reyes and Horne began offering theatre workshop classes together. The school portion of this institution trained dancers for professional employment in the field of musical theatre; offering not only dance classes but also acting and music lessons. Many of its pupils obtained employment on the Broadway stage. By 1980 the school had an enrollment of 250 students. Located in Theatre Row at 440 W. 42nd Street, the school operated for 11 years. In addition to being a school, the organization had its own professional company known as Dancing Plus.

In addition to its school the NHMTS operated the Off-Off Broadway Nat Horne Theatre (NHT) which had a seating capacity of 115. The theatre was previously known as the Masque Theater and had been used for sexually explicit burlesque shows and an adult movie theater. The NHMTS acquired and remodeled the theatre, transforming it from a seedy venue into a legitimate playhouse.

Horne served as artistic director of the NHT with Reyes holding the post of executive producer of the theatre. Shows staged at the theatre included Hugh Wheeler's Look, We've Come Through! (1976), Ken Campbell's The Great Caper (1976), Freda Scott's version of The Late Late Show (1976), Kay Kynlon's Tatiana Golikova Is Real (1976), Allen Deitch's version of The Late Late Show (1976, also directed by Horne), Deitch's Homeseekers (1976), Jerome Walman's I Murdered My Finch One Day Last Spring (1976), Nikki Stern and John Faro PiRoman's Ham (1976), and Aarion Brown's Onica Mitchell Is in Double Jeopardy: She's Black and Female (1977), D. H. Lawrence's The Fight for Barbara (1978), Paul Zindel's Let Me Hear You Whisper (1982), Zindel's The Ladies Should Be in Bed (1982), Anthony P. Curry's Divine Hysteria (1982), Stephen Levi's Getting Mama Married (1983), Jane Nixon Willis's SLAM! (1983), Willis's Triptych (1984), Peter Samelson's The Magician (1986), Michael Lynch's Sister Gloria's Pentecoastal Baby (1987), Keith Reddin's Plain Brown Wrapper (1987), Murphy Martell and Fredrick Davies's The Great Truman Capote (1987), John Thorburn Hall's DASH (1988), and Paul Dick's Once/Twice (1990) among others. The theatre was active as late as 1994 when it staged Le Wilhelm's A Malice in the Wood.

In March 1981 Horne was honored at a special event at the Virginia Center for the Performing Arts entitled "Nat Horne Comes Home" which featured local professional performing groups and university music and dance ensembles performing works with which he was associated in the first half of the program. The second half included excerpts from NHMTS's professional company (Dancing Plus) production of David Dusing and Glen Vecchione musical The Legend of Frankie and Johnny, which Horne choreographed. Dusing, a classical tenor and composer, taught voice on the faculty of the NHMTS. The Legend of Frankie and Johnny was given its premiere at the NHT on April 10, 1981, and closed after 38 performances. It toured the United States after its New York run.

The NHT, along with the New Elgin Theatre, was the venue used by the Black American Film Festival, founded by Carl Offord in 1977. In 1980 the NHT was used as the venue for the International Directors Festival.

== Later career ==
After the closing of the NHMTS, Horne remained active as a teacher of dance workshops at universities and conferences both in the United States and internationally. He presented master classes in Germany, France, Austria, Switzerland, Corsica, Japan, and Israel. Following Reyes's death in 1992, he formed a close artistic partnership with composer and conductor David Dusing. Together the two men were the artistic force behind annual musicals staged by Muse Machine at the Victoria Theatre in Dayton, Ohio. Musicals they co-staged together with Horne also choreographing and Dusing also serving as music director included Rodgers and Hammerstein's South Pacific (1992), Oliver! (1993), Moose Charlap and Jule Styne's Peter Pan (1994 and 2008), The Music Man (1995), The Wizard of Oz (1996), Me and My Girl (1997 and 2009), Mame (1998), Damn Yankees (1999) My Favorite Year (2000) My Fair Lady (2001), The Pajama Game (2002), Guys and Dolls (2003), How to Succeed in Business Without Really Trying (2004), On the Town (2005), Beauty and the Beast (2006), Thoroughly Modern Millie (2007), and Singin' in the Rain (2010).

== Personal life ==
Horne's father died in 1957, and his mother died in 1973. As of 2024 he resides in Hell's Kitchen, Manhattan, where he has lived for more than 60 years.
