= Dayton Performing Arts Alliance =

Nonprofit organization in Ohio, US

The Dayton Performing Arts Alliance is a nonprofit performing arts association located in Dayton, Ohio and composed of three performing arts groups: the Dayton Philharmonic Orchestra, the Dayton Opera, and the Dayton Ballet and incorporated as a 501(3)(c) nonprofit organization.

The Dayton Performing Arts Alliance is believed to be one of the first nonprofit organizations in the United States to simultaneously manage a symphony orchestra, an opera company, and a ballet company.

A preliminary study of the merger of the Dayton Philharmonic Orchestra, the Dayton Opera, and the Dayton Ballet was announced in January 2011 for the stated purposes of reducing operating costs and attracting new revenue while still maintaining the individuality of the three art forms, and was supported with funds provided by the Nonprofit Alliance Support Program of The Dayton Foundation. In early 2012, the three organizations received commitments of support contingent upon the merger taking place. These contingent grants totaled $1.25 million over the next three years and were offered by the Harry A. Toumlin, Jr. and Virginia B. Toumlin Fund of the Dayton Foundation and an anonymous donor.

A plan was created to consolidate the management structures and business operations of the three original organizations under one executive director and 39-member board of trustees, and each organization maintains its own artistic director. All three artistic organizations have maintained their distinct identities and have continued appealing to their donors under their own names rather than simply as an arts alliance. The union of the Dayton Ballet, the Dayton Opera, and the Dayton Philharmonic Orchestra under the aegis of the Dayton Performing Arts Alliance was formalized on July 1, 2012.
