= Valman =

Valman may refer to:

- Valman language, a Torricelli language of Papua New Guinea
- Valman, Iran, a village in Markazi Province, Iran

== See also ==
- Wallman/Wallmann
- Walman/Walmann
