= Ballpark Village =

Ballpark Village may refer to:

- Dayton Ballpark Village, the former name of the Water Street District in Dayton, Ohio
- Ballpark Village (St. Louis)
