= Walman =

Walman or Walmann is a surname. Notable people with the surname include:

- Jake Walman (born 1996), Canadian-American professional ice hockey player
- Jerome Walman, American composer
- Aleksander Walmann (born 1986), Norwegian singer and songwriter

== See also ==
- Valman (disambiguation)
- Wallman/Wallmann
