= James Meena =

American Conductor and Opera Minister

James Meena Conductor
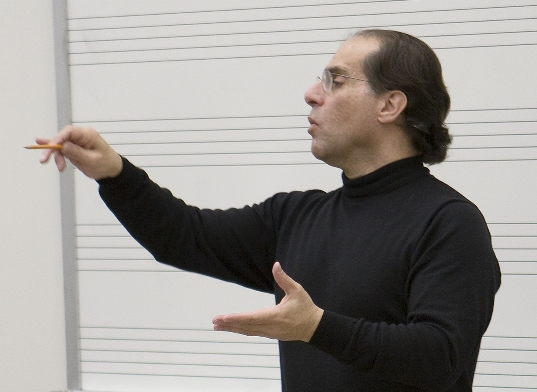
- James Meena conducting in December 2007
- Born: 1951 (age 74–75)
- Education: Carnegie Mellon University
- Occupations: Opera conductor and Administrator
- Years active: 1980–present
- Agent: Uzan International Artist (US).

James Meena (born 1951) is an American conductor and opera administrator. Meena served as general director and principal conductor of Toledo Opera in Ohio, and the general director and principal conductor of Opera Carolina, in Charlotte, North Carolina.

== Early life and education ==
Meena was born in Cleveland, Ohio, the son of V. Rev. James C. Meena an Antiochian Orthodox priest and musician who studied composition and wrote three hymnals as well as arranging and translating Tchaikovsky's Liturgy of St. John Chrysostom into English. He spent his childhood in Los Angeles and Pittsburgh before returning to Cleveland when his father became pastor of the St. George Antiochian Orthodox Church there. Meena did his undergraduate studies at Baldwin Wallace College Conservatory of Music, receiving his Bachelor of Arts degree in 1973, and then taught music for three years in Cleveland's high schools as well as singing in the Cleveland Symphony Chorus. He studied conducting with Robert Page, the chorus's director and a professor at Carnegie Mellon University, where Meena received his Master of Fine Arts in conducting in 1978. When Page became director of the Mendelssohn Choir of Pittsburgh in September 1979, he hired Meena as his assistant. He also studied conducting with Thomas Mihalak, who was music director of the New Jersey Symphony for six seasons; the opera conductor Rudolph Fellner; and Boris Halip, a former associate concertmaster and conductor of the Bolshoi Ballet who had emigrated to Cleveland and with whom Meena also studied violin. Meena is also known for conducting completely from memory.

== Conducting career ==
Meena made his professional debut in 1980, conducting the Pittsburgh Symphony and Mendelssohn Choir in performances of Haydn’s The Creation. His professional opera debut was in 1983 (Mozart’s The Magic Flute) with Pittsburgh Opera, where he was associate conductor. His apprentice years in Pittsburgh included work as music director of the Three Rivers Training Orchestra and McKeesport Symphony, and director of the Pennsylvania Opera Festival, which has since become the Pittsburgh Opera young artist program. In 1986 he was appointed artistic director of Toledo Opera, making his company debut with Carmen, and in 1988 he was appointed resident conductor of the Toledo Symphony, where he conducted Classics, Mainly Mozart, Community Concerts and Symphony Pops concerts. Concurrently, in 1997 he was appointed conductor of the Cleveland/San Jose Ballet, with which he conducted more than twenty performances each season, including the annual Nutcracker production. Meena was appointed general director and principal conductor of Opera Carolina in 2000.

He has also maintained an active career as guest conductor of opera and concerts in the United States and abroad, having conducted the New York City Opera, the National Symphony ROC, the KBS Symphony Orchestra (Seoul), the Cairo Philharmonic, Orchestra Regionale Toscana (Italy) and the orchestra of Teatro Massimo Bellini in Sicily, as well as L’Opera de Montreal, Portland Opera, Washington Opera as well as the opera companies in Modena (Italy), Livorno (Italy), Lucca (Italy), Ravenna (Italy), Pisa (Italy), Phoenix, Sarasota, and Edmonton, Ottawa and Winnipeg (Canada) where he led the world premiere performances of Victor Davies’ The Transit of Venus, which was broadcast nationally over the CBC. His performances of Verdi’s Il Trovatore, Gounod’s Faust and Tchaikovsky’s Eugene Onegin have been recorded and broadcast over National Public Radio's World of Opera.

== Recordings ==
- Charles Duvernoy: Concerto for Clarinet and Orchestra No. 3 (world premiere recording), François Devienne: Première Sonate in B flat, Jean Francaix: Tema con variazioni – Collaborative Arts Chamber Orchestra, James Meena (conductor). Koch International Classics CD 37186-2.
