= Toledo Opera =

Opera company in Toledo, Ohio, United States

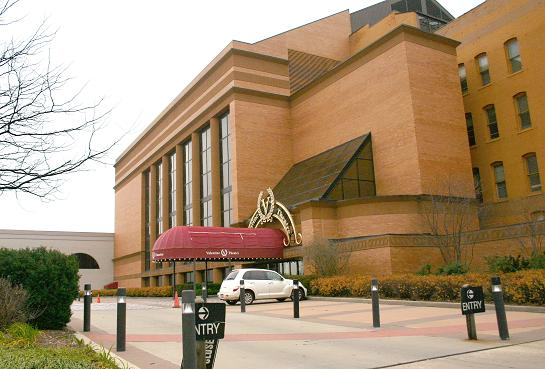
- The Valentine Theatre, home of the Toledo Opera
- Formation: 1959; 67 years ago
- Type: Nonprofit
- Headquarters: Toledo, Ohio
- General Director: James M. Norman
- Revenue: $1.3 m USD (2023)
- Website: toledoopera.org

The Toledo Opera is an American opera company in Toledo, Ohio, performing in the Valentine Theatre in downtown Toledo. The company's season consists of two to three fully-realized operas, plus additional community programming for the Northwest Ohio region.

== History ==
Founded in 1959, the company's first general director was Lester Freedman with conductor Joseph Hawthorne serving as music director. In 1960, Freedman founded the Dayton Opera and for many years he led the two organizations simultaneously - an arrangement which cut down on production costs for both companies. Mr. Freedman enjoyed a great collaboration with many Metropolitan Opera stars who came to Toledo Opera to sing. These included Placido Domingo, Lili Chookasian, Chester Ludgin, Roberta Peters, Robert Merrill, Barry Morell, James McCracken, Louise Russell, Martina Arroyo and many more including conductors Anton Coppola, Anton Guadagno, and Imre Pallo. In 1983, Freedman was forced out of his position by the Toledo Opera Board after in-fighting among the company's leadership. Several interim directors kept the company going over the next three years, including David Bamberger and Johan van der Merwe.

In 1986, conductor James Meena became the company's new permanent general director and successfully produced opera at the Masonic Theatre (now called the Stranahan Theatre). During Mo. Meena's tenure, many rising opera start appeared in Toledo Opera's productions including Renee Fleming, Mark Delavan, and Marcello Giordani. In 1994, Toledo philanthropists Theodore and Lucille Gorski created a major financial boon for the company through a one million dollar challenge grant which enabled it to establish an endowment. That same year the company played a major role in supporting the renovation of the historic Valentine Theatre in Toledo; a decision which saved the theatre from demolition. The renovations of the theater took several years, and Toledo Opera could not move into its new permanent home until 1999. The company had the honor of opening the newly renovated theater for Toledo Opera's 40th Season gala night on October 22, 1999, with a production of Giacomo Puccini's Tosca, featuring Diana Soviero in the title role.

In 2000, Renay Conlin succeeded Meena as the director of Toledo Opera. David Shengold highlighted the company in the February 2006 issue of Opera magazine, commenting that "Toledo's proudest legacy of its glory days of glass and automobile manufacturing is its astonishing Museum of Art, free to all and with a collection to make strong curators weak. But operatically-minded visitors should not overlook the worthy Toledo Opera, housed in the impressive yet intimate Valentine Theatre, a beautiful 900-seat house built in 1895." In 2005, Conlin launched a capital campaign to increase the endowment and was able to raise $2 million. Ms. Conlin was also able to secure the company's first NEA grant.

In March 2011, Conlin resigned from Toledo Opera when she took a position as CEO of Napa Valley Museum. The board of directors appointed a former development director, Suzanne Rorick, as Toledo Opera's new executive director. Under Rorick's leadership, the company has focused on fundraising and education and has undergone an artistic re-organization that saw the return of several former Toledo Opera colleagues, including James Meena, who served as guest conductor and principal artistic adviser until October 2019. Ms. Rorick brought financial stability and artistic excellence to the company with many of today's operatic stars gracing its productions including Jennifer Rowley, Kathryn Lewek, Othalie Graham, and Michael Chioldi. James M. Norman and Kevin Bylsma were appointed as co-artistic directors in 2020 after Meena stepped down as principal artistic adviser.

In 2018, Toledo Opera presented the world premiere of I Dream, a "rhythm and blues opera" with libretto, lyrics, and music by Douglas Tappin, chronicling the last 36 hours of Dr. Martin Luther King, Jr's life. I Dream was first conceived in 2006, and an earlier revision of the work was performed in Atlanta in 2010.

Toledo Opera has continued offering world class opera in the midwest with a mixture of traditional opera, operetta, and new works. In 2022, the company produced the award winning opera Blue with librettist Tazwell Thompson directing and Chelsea Tipton II conducting. May 2024 saw the retirement of Executive Director Suzanne Rorick. In December 2023, the Toledo Opera Board named James M. Norman as general director and Kevin Bylsma as artistic director to continue the excellence audiences have come to expect from this regional company. Under their guidance, Toledo Opera has added Broadway musicals such as Ragtime and South Pacific to the repertoire to critical and audience acclaim.

== Programming ==
Opera On Wheels, its resident artist education program, annually performs for 22,000 elementary and junior high students in the region and the resident artists are featured in the mainstage productions providing them with exposure and education from world-class singers, conductors, and directors. Toledo Opera's preschool program, An Opera Is A Story, visits preschool classrooms in Toledo Public Schools to develop literacy and social-emotional skills in children. This program helps prepare children for kindergarten as they practice Ohio Early Learning objectives.
