= Albert Reyes (director) =

Albert Bosco Reyes (14 October 1941 – 26 October 1992) was a Mexican-born American theatre director, playwright, educator, businessman, and producer and director for television and radio. He is best remembered as a co-founder of the Nat Horne Musical Theatre and School. He served as the school's executive director.

== Life and career ==
The son of Carlos O Reyes and his wife Maria de los Angeles Raquel Sevilla Cantis, Albert Bosco Reyes was born in Mexico City on 14 October 1941. As a young adult he served in the United States Army and became a naturalized American citizen. He studied theatre at Brooklyn College (BC) where he portrayed Bill Calhoun/Lucentio in the BC's 1964 production of Kiss Me, Kate.

From 1968 through 1977 he worked as a producer and director for NBC. He directed the 1970 NBC Radio Network documentary The Contaminated Human which focused on environmental pollution in the United States and its effects on human health. He won eight Peabody Awards for his work in radio and television. He also worked as a writer for News 4 New York and was president of the video production company Pro Desktop.

Reyes formed a longtime collaborative partnership with the dancer and choreographer Nat Horne. They began their association in 1969 leading production of musicals together in stock theatre with Reyes directing and Horne choreographing. From this point into the early 1970s they staged stock theatre productions of Anything Goes, 1776, and West Side Story among other musicals. In 1974 they staged the Virginia Museum Theatre's (VMT) production of Purlie.

In 1975 Horne and Reyes co-founded the Nat Horne Musical Theatre and School (NHMTS). Located in Theatre Row at 440 W. 42nd Street, the school operated for 11 years. The origins of this organization dated to two years earlier when Reyes and Horne began offering theatre workshop classes together. The school portion of this institution trained dancers for professional employment in the field of musical theatre, and many of its pupils worked professionally on the Broadway stage.

In addition to its school the NHMTS operated the Off-Off Broadway Nat Horne Theatre (NHT) which Reyes and Horne established after purchasing and remodeling the Masque Theater; transforming a venue which had previously presented burlesque shows featuring strippers into a legitimate professional theatre in the newly created Theatre Row district. Reyes served as the NHT's executive producer and Horne its Artistic Director. With Edward Brown he co-authored the musical The Phantom, an adaptation of The Phantom of the Opera which reset the story in the context of a 1970s dance troupe. It was staged at the NHT in 1978. That same year he crafted and directed the NHT musical revue 42nd Street (no relation to the Broadway musical), and adapted, directed, and designed the NHT production of War of the Worlds.

In addition to producing the seasons of plays and musicals staged at the NHT, Reyes also occasionally directed productions at the theatre. Some of the works he directed at the NHT included Jerome Walman's I Murdered My Finch One Day Last Spring (1978), Bob Ost's Breeders (1979), and David Dusing and Glen Vecchione's musical The Legend of Frankie and Johnny (1981). The latter production toured the United States after the end of its New York run.

Reyes died at Mount Sinai Hospital, Manhattan, at the age of 51 from stomach cancer related to his diagnosis of AIDS on 26 October 1992.
