= Glen Vecchione =

American composer and writer

Glen Vecchione (born 12 July 1951) is an American composer, lyricist, poet, and writer. Working with the director David Dusing he wrote the music and lyrics to the musical The Legend of Frankie and Johnny. He is the author and illustrator of several non-fiction books for children and young adults; many of them written on science related topics or on children's games. He has also published poetry for adults in several literary journals. Under the pseudonym Glen Peters he wrote the novel Where the Nights Smell Like Bread.

== Life and career ==
Glen Vecchione was born in Manhattan on 12 July 1951. An Italian-American, his ancestors founded the Brooklyn-based cheese manufacturing company Polly-O. He spent his childhood in New York City, and later moved to San Juan Capistrano, California, where he lived during the 1970s. He was educated at the University of California, Los Angeles.

Vecchione's choral work "Spinnin' Round" was premiered in a concert at Alice Tully Hall on June 24, 1981. With David Dusing he co-authored the music and lyrics for the Broadway musical The Legend of Frankie and Johnny which was staged as a limited run in New York City by the Nat Horne Musical Theatre. It opened on April 10, 1981 and closed after 38 performances. The production was directed by Albert Reyes and choreographed by Nat Horne. It toured the United States after the end of its New York run. As an actor he portrayed Felix White in the world premiere of John Twomey's Teachers' Lounge at the Laguna Playhouse in 1994. He penned the play Cowboy BO and the Train Whistle which was staged at the Lyceum Theatre in San Diego in 2011 as part of the Actors Alliance Festival. Working with filmmakers Lewis Hall and Clark Dugger, Vecchione also wrote three musical scores for American Education Films and Taylor and Francis Publishing Groups. He also composed television music for NBC and CBS announcing their fall lineup seasons.

Vecchione is the author and illustrator of several books for children; many of them non-fiction books on games. His book The World's Best Street & Yard Games (1990, Sterling Publishing), drew on his experiences playing city games on the streets of New York. It contained 92 games from around the world, both historical and contemporary, that could be played by children with either no equipment or everyday items such as a rope or stick; making them cheap and accessible. To write the book, Vecchione tested all of the games with the children of his friends. It was followed by other books on children's games including World's Best Outdoor Games (1992, Sterling Publishing) The Jump Rope Book (1995, Sterling Publishing), The Little Giant Book of Kids' Games (1999, Sterling Publications), and Sidewalk Games (2003, Sterling Publications).

Vecchione has also penned 28 science-related books for children and young adults. His book 100 Amazing Make-It-Yourself Science Fair Projects (1994, Sterling Publications) compiled one hundred winning projects from science fairs, and distilled them into reproducible instructions with detailed explanations of the science principles demonstrated in each project and with illustrations drawn by Vecchione. His book Magnet Science (1996, Sterling Publications) features several activities and experiments accessible to children which can help teach the scientific properties of magnetism. He also wrote the forward to and was the editor of the cookbook A Place at the Table: Food, Faith and Friendship at the Immaculate Heart Center for Spiritual Renewal which contained recipes by chef Teresa Fanucchi of the Los Angeles-based Immaculate Heart Community. and was favorably reviewed by author and Food Critic Emily Dwass in the Los Angeles Times.
