= Dayton Ballet =

Ballet company based in Dayton, Ohio

General information
- Name: Dayton Ballet
- Previous names: Experimental Group for Young Dancers; Dayton Theatre Dance Group; Dayton Civic Ballet
- Year founded: 1937
- Founders: Josephine Schwarz; Hermene Schwarz
- Principal venue: Victoria Theatre; Dayton, Ohio; United States
- Website: www.daytonballet.org

Senior staff
- President and CEO: Patrick Nugent - Dayton Performing Arts Alliance

Artistic staff
- Artistic director: Brandon Ragland

Other
- Associated schools: Dayton Ballet School; Wright State University Dance Department-Dayton Ballet II Scholarship Program
- Formation: Company Dancer; Apprentice; Trainee

The Dayton Ballet is a ballet company based in Dayton, Ohio.

The Dayton Ballet was founded in 1937, making it the second oldest regional ballet company in the United States. Dayton Ballet seasons typically comprise four works—familiar traditional ballets, such as The Nutcracker, as well as new and innovative works—and over 40 performances.

The Dayton Ballet performs in the historic 1,139-seat Victoria Theatre (Dayton, Ohio) and the 2,300-seat Schuster Performing Arts Center.

Part of the Dayton Performing Arts Alliance, which also oversees the Dayton Opera and the Dayton Philharmonic, the ballet receives administrative and operational leadership and support from its parent organization. Brandon Ragland has been the Artistic Director of the Dayton Ballet since 2023.

== History ==
Dayton Ballet had its beginning when Josephine (Jo) Schwarz and her sister Hermene opened The Schwarz School of Dance in 1927. Jo Schwarz later studied ballet and danced in Chicago, in New York at the School of American Ballet, and in Europe. She danced on Broadway, but was forced to return home to Dayton after being injured while performing there. In May 1938, Jo and Hermene gathered together the school's finest dancers, named the troupe "The Experimental Group for Young Dancers," and staged a performance at the Dayton Art Institute. This was the first performance of what is now the Dayton Ballet.

Jo was a pioneer of the American regional ballet movement of the mid-20th century. Through years of persistence, she made Dayton a center of dance. In 1958, the company restructured as the Dayton Civic Ballet, with a board of directors, and federal tax-exempt status. In 1959, the Dayton Civic Ballet became a chartered member of the Northeast Regional Ballet Association. The Schwarz sisters organized many regional dance festivals and choreography conferences. In 1978, the company dropped the "Civic" designation and became the fully professional Dayton Ballet.

=== 1980–1990 ===
Stuart Sebastian, a student of Josephine and Hermene Schwarz, assumed directorship of the company in 1980 at the invitation of Josephine Schwarz. He had danced professionally for the Dayton Ballet and the National Ballet of Washington before assuming the role. He had also choreographed in New York, Germany and England. Sebastian led the Dayton Ballet for 10 years, in which time the company rose in stature and status.

Sebastian brought in new dancers and created the company's first full-length ballet, The Sleeping Beauty. He choreographed over 25 new works. Of those, six were full-length ballets, including Swan Lake and Dracula. Under Sebastian, the Dayton Ballet toured more than 75 cities and took its first international tour to Jerash, Jordan. In 1988, the company appeared on national television while performing in the opening ceremonies of the Pan American Games.

=== Transition: 1991-1993 ===
Following the departure of Stuart Sebastian in 1990 and his subsequent death in January 1991 after a lengthy battle with AIDS, the company entered a period of transition. James Clouser, former artistic director of the Houston Ballet, was brought in on a three-year contract. It was a bumpy and tumultuous time for the company, and a time of considerable change. Clouser was the first outside, non-Daytonian director, the Dayton Ballet had ever seen, and was a considerable break from the company's past directors. Many dancers and staff from the previous era left, and many new dancers and staff were hired. According to Dayton Daily News articles written during the transition, the board of trustees was looking for change and that is why they brought in someone from the outside. In the fall of 1992 an executive director was brought in for the very first time in the company's history: Dermot Burke.

=== Recent history: 1993–2011 ===
Dermot Burke was a star principal dancer with the Joffrey Ballet in New York and had been artistic director of the American Repertory Ballet in New Jersey for 10 years. He knew and choreographed for Sebastian and the Dayton Ballet back in 1984. In the Fall of 1993 Dermot assumed the dual role of executive and artistic director of the company.

Under Dermot Burke, the company took on a more American flavor in the tradition of the Joffrey Ballet, embracing distinctly American dance literature, dancers and choreographers. There was also a shift to a "repertory company with lots of choreographic voices," as Burke stated. This repertory includes and has held onto the work of Sebastian and the company's past, while at the same time including the work of outside choreographers. In 2011 Karen Russo Burke became Artistic Director of the Dayton Ballet before it merged with the Dayton Opera and the Dayton Philharmonic to form the Dayton Performing Arts Alliance in 2012.

=== 2012 merger ===
Following more than two years of planning, the Dayton Ballet, Dayton Opera, and Dayton Philharmonic Orchestra—Dayton’s three classical performing arts organizations—became a new, single entity on July 1, 2012. This new organization was named the Dayton Performing Arts Alliance. It is the largest performing arts organization in the community. Dayton Performing Arts Alliance performances are made possible in part by Montgomery County and Culture Works. The organization also receives partial funding from the Ohio Arts Council.

The new organization has one administrative and operational core with one CEO and executive director, with each performing arts unit retaining its own artistic director.

== Dayton Ballet School ==
The company's dependent dance school, Dayton Ballet School, is the oldest dance school in Dayton and one of the oldest in the US. It is the only school in the Miami Valley that is linked to a professional dance company.

Notable Alumni

- Jeraldyne Blunden, founder and former director of the Dayton Contemporary Dance Company.
- Dan Duell, dancer with the New York City Ballet and artistic director of Ballet Chicago.
- Joseph Duell, dancer with the New York City Ballet.
- Jeff Gribler, dancer and ballet master with the Pennsylvania Ballet.
- Peter LeBreton Merz, dancer with Louisville Ballet and Cincinnati Ballet, Director of the Academy at Ballet West in Salt Lake City, UT.
- Stuart Sebastian, former Dayton Ballet Artistic Director and dancer with National Ballet of Washington.
- Donna Wood, dancer with Alvin Ailey.
- Rebecca Wright, dancer with American Ballet Theatre, on Broadway in Merlin, and with the Joffrey Ballet.

== See also ==
- Dayton Philharmonic Orchestra
- Dayton Opera
