= Lester Freedman =

Lester Freedman (June 6, 1921 - May 29, 1994, Los Angeles) was an American opera director. In 1959 he founded the Toledo Opera and in 1960 he founded the Dayton Opera. He led both organizations concurrently until 1981 when he resigned from his post in Dayton. In May 1983 he was fired from his position as director of the Toledo Opera after 24 years of service. His termination was preceded by several years of financial difficulties and in-fighting between Freedman and several of the opera board's members. The following year he founded the Lyric Opera Association of Toledo.
