= Schuster Performing Arts Center =

Benjamin & Marian Schuster Performing Arts Center
- Schuster Center
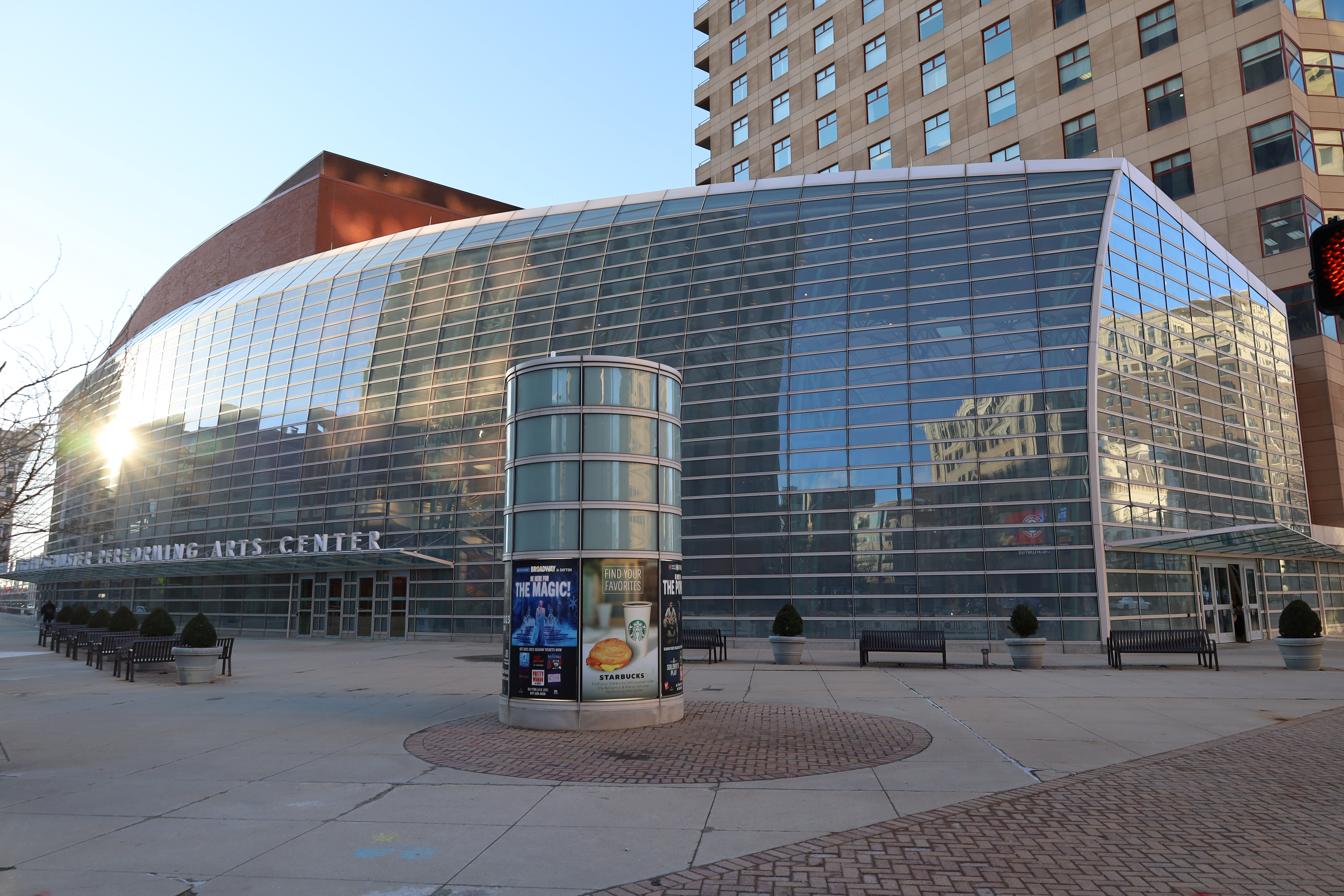
- Interactive map of Benjamin & Marian Schuster Performing Arts Center
- Full name: Benjamin & Marian Schuster Performing Arts Center
- Address: 1 West Second Street
- Location: Dayton, Ohio
- Coordinates: 39°45′40″N 84°11′36″W
- Owner: Dayton Live
- Operator: Dayton Live
- Capacity: Winsupply Theatre: 2,300; Mathile Theatre: 150
- Type: Performing Arts Center

Construction
- Built: 2000-2003
- Opened: 2003
- Architect: César Pelli

Tenants
- Dayton Philharmonic Orchestra, Dayton Opera, Dayton Ballet

Website
- www.daytonlive.org/venues/schuster-center/

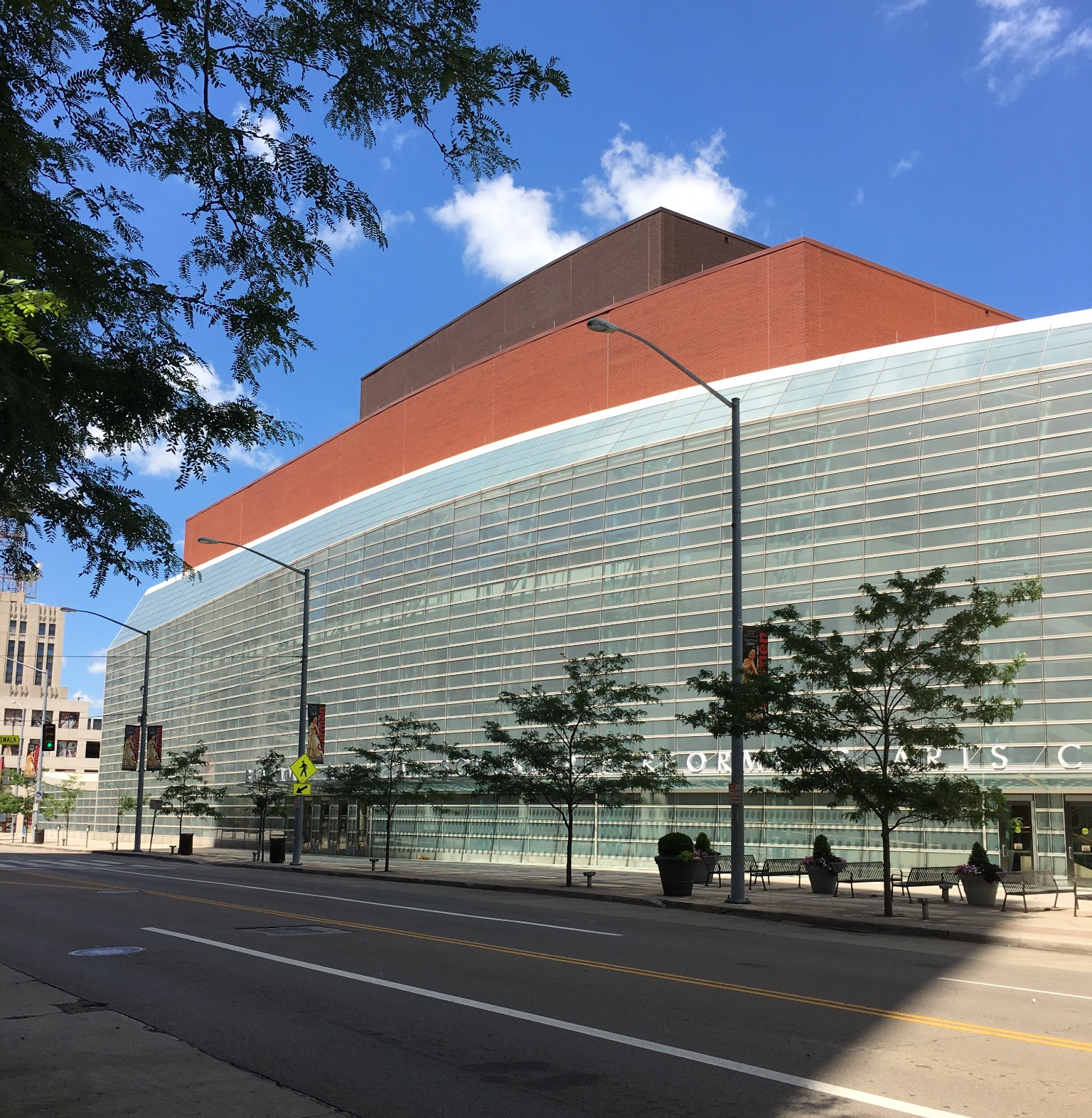
Schuster Center Exterior

The Benjamin & Marian Schuster Performing Arts Center (Schuster Center) is located in Dayton, Ohio and was built in 2003 to serve as Dayton's principal venue for performing arts. It is owned and operated by Dayton Live and occupies the former site of Rike's department store on a block comprising North Main Street, West Second Street and North Ludlow Street. It is named for local philanthropists Dr. Benjamin Schuster and his wife, Marian, who donated the lead gift ($8 million) for the project.

The Schuster Center houses the 2300-seat Winsupply Theatre (formerly the "Mead Theatre" from 2003 through 2024), the ticket office for all Dayton Live venues, a Starbucks café, a glass enclosed lobby called the Kettering Wintergarden, and the multi-purpose Mathile Theatre hosting performances, events, and rehearsals. Attached to the Schuster Center is Performance Place Tower, a 15-story residential and office condominium.

The Schuster Center opened as an additional venue to house Dayton Live's larger touring Broadway productions and presentations. The Dayton Philharmonic, the Dayton Opera, and the Dayton Ballet rent the building for their performances. The Schuster Center and the Metropolitan Arts Center, occupying the former Metropolitan Company department store building next to the Victoria Theatre, stage a variety of performances and form the basis of the performing arts district in downtown Dayton.

== History ==
The Schuster Center was designed by architect César Pelli. Built on the former site of the Rike-Kumler department store, construction commenced in April 2000 and was completed in February 2003 for a total cost of $121 million. Dr. Benjamin Schuster and his wife Marian donated $8 million to the project.

The opening weekend of February 28, 2003, brought together Dayton-born artists as well as national celebrities for the opening, billed as the "Gala Evening of Stars". Attendees and performers included Walter Cronkite, Ray Charles, and Allison Janney.

== Architectural Details ==
The Schuster Center's main performance space is the 2,300 seat Winsupply Theatre. A fiber optic "starfield" on the ceiling of the Winsupply Theatre re-creates the night sky on the day of the Wright Brothers' first airplane flight in 1903.

In addition to the Winsupply Theatre, the Mathilde Theatre can be used for rehearsals, meetings, and smaller productions. The Kettering Wintergarden is a block-long glass atrium with live and preserved palm trees. The AES Foundation Stage is often used for gala events, weddings and receptions, and preperformance.

The Schuster Center has hosted musicals including Hamilton, The Lion King, Les Misérables, Wicked, Jersey Boys, Joseph and the Amazing Technicolor Dreamcoat and Beauty and the Beast.
