= Jerome Walman =

American composer

Jerome Walman is an American composer and a certified instructor of the Schillinger System of Musical Composition. He studied at Boston University, Juilliard School of Music, Berklee School of Music, and at New York University (where he studied under Rudolph Schramm). Walman is one of the last certified of instructors of the Schillinger System. He was actively involved with Lehman Engel's BMI Musical Theater Workshop, where many of his works were performed in concert.

Walman has been produced on and off Broadway and in regional theatre. Two of his compositions, a string quartet and a wind quintet, have been performed at Carnegie Hall. He developed the Walman Method, which includes musical composition, lyrics and book writing for theater, musical and cinema. He is the composer of the musical Moments: A Musical Interpretation, a four character musical based on the work of Henry James; and Washington Square, a five-character chamber opera orchestrated by Robert Russell Bennett, starring Biff Mcguire, Jeannie Carson, Hurd Hatfield and directed by Davey Marlin Jones.Performed at The Washington Theater Club, a resident professional theater in Washington, D.C. from 1960 to 1974. Founded as a summer company (this organization developed into a successful regional theater dedicated to the production of new and unknown plays. During its most successful years, under the leadership of Davey Marlin-Jones, this theater produced the early works of Lanford Wilson, Oliver Hailey, and Arthur Laurents, and won the Margo Jones award for its contributions to the American theater).

In 1978 Walman's play I Murdered My Finch One Day Last Spring was staged at the Nat Horne Theatre with Albert Reyes as the stage director. Walman's other works include From The Street, two operas, several one-act plays and Last Call.

Walman specializes in "The Great American Songbook" and theatre musicals, cabaret material and scores for cinema. He is retired.
