= Wallman =

Wallman is a surname. Notable people with the surname include:

- Arvid Wallman (1901-1982), Swedish diver, gold medalist in plain high diving at the 1920 Olympics, representing Sweden
- Christiana Wallman, American singer-songwriter and writer
- Hans E. Wallman, Swedish entrepreneur, impresario, composer, film director, author, and theatrical producer
- Henry Wallman, American mathematician
- Jan Wallman, American nightclub owner and producer
- Katherine Wallman, American statistician
- Margarete Wallmann, German-Austrian ballerina, choreographer, stage designer, and opera director
- Sam Wallman, Australian journalist
- Norm Wallman, American politician, Nebraska state senator from 2007 to 2015
- Steven Wallman, American commissioner of the U.S. Securities and Exchange Commission from 1994 to 1997

== See also ==
- Walman
