= Dayton Opera =

Opera company based in Ohio, United States

- Founded: 1960
- Founder: Lester Freedman
- Location: Dayton, Ohio, United States
- Key people: Chandler Johnson (Artistic Director)
- Affiliations: Dayton Performing Arts Alliance
- Budget: Approx. $2 million annually
- Website: Official Site

Dayton Opera is an American opera company based in Dayton, Ohio. The company makes its home at the Schuster Performing Arts Center in downtown Dayton where it annually produces three operas and an operatic concert and has an annual budget of approximately $2 million. Chandler Johnson is the Artistic Director.

== History ==
The Dayton Opera was founded in 1960 by the opera impresario Lester Freedman, who also led the Toledo Opera company. For 20 years under Freedman, the company produced opera at Dayton's Memorial Hall. From 1981 to 1993 the company operated in partnership with the Michigan Opera Theatre under artistic director David DiChiera and other administrators. In 1996 Dayton Opera entered into a partnership with the Cincinnati Opera, sharing staff including the general director Thomas Bankston. The late 1990s saw the company grow in stature and independence, culminating in a move to the new Benjamin and Marian Schuster Performing Arts Center in 2003.

Over its history the Dayton Opera has produced a wide repertoire of Italian, French, American and German opera. It has presented many prominent guest stars, including Plácido Domingo, Martina Arroyo, and Deborah Voigt, among others. Since 1987 the company has encouraged new talent in opera through a professional training program and an artist-in-residency.

Since 1998 the company has maintained a partnership with Dayton's Victoria Theatre under which the two companies share administrative and management functions. The Dayton Opera is a not-for-profit organization funded by individual and corporate contributions as well as county and state support. The Opera Guild of Dayton is a volunteer support organization.

== See also ==
- Dayton Ballet
- Dayton Philharmonic Orchestra
