= Water Street District (Dayton) =

Coordinates: 39°45′58″N 84°11′09″W

The Water Street District is a mixed-use development under construction in Downtown Dayton, Ohio.

== History ==
The land the development sits on is in Downtown Dayton, along the bank of the Great Miami River and the confluence of the Mad River at the intersection of East Monument Avenue and Riverside Drive.

=== Ballpark Village ===
A mixed-use development was proposed on the land in November 2006, termed Ballpark Village, with Los Angeles-based Mandalay Entertainment Group and Cincinnati-based Bear Creek Capital as developers. The announcement on the $230 million development on the bank of the river had come on the heels of a $51 million development several blocks away as a new headquarters for CareSource. In all, the development was to consist of three projects: a big box retailer on the north side of the river, a 200-unit upscale condominium, and a 300,000-square-foot entertainment complex with restaurant, retail and office space, with 1,000 parking spaces. It was expected to be the largest commercial development in the city's history

Over the next year, the developers conducted due diligence while the city negotiated to purchase land for the development, with the process being extended from six months to over one year. Several companies including Thompson Hine LLP signed letters of intent to move into the building. Plans for the development were finished in early 2008 and submitted to developers. After lengthy discussions, Bear Creek Capital backed out of the project due in part to trouble financing the project. Mandalay and the city initially opted to push ahead with the project, however in November 2008 after tenants pulled out of plans to move into the building, it was postponed indefinitely in the midst of the Great Recession. As of 2010 there were no plans to restart the project.

=== Water Street District ===
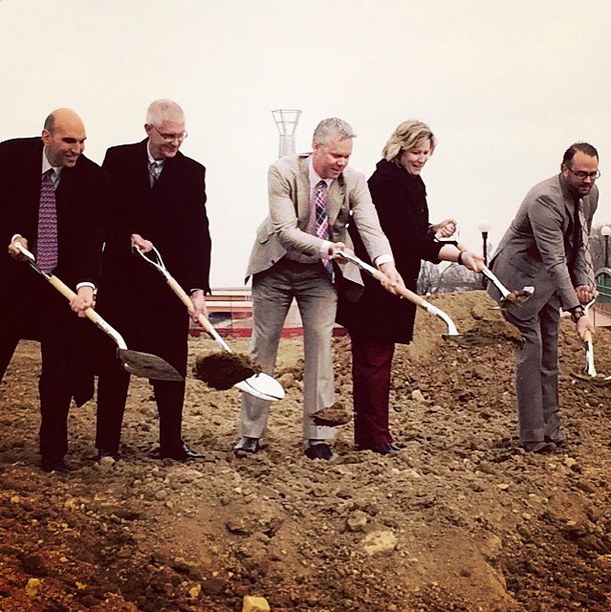
Formal groundbreaking for Water Street District on March 19, 2015

The City of Dayton purchased land on the site of the development in May 2013, raising the possibility that a new development could be in the works there. And the project was unveiled in July 2013, as a $36 million mixed-use project to be developed by Dayton-based Woodard Real Estate Resources and Columbus-based Crawford Hoying as developers. Dubbed "Water Street District," the initial plan had been for a 50,000-square-foot office building, 161 luxury apartments and a 430-space parking garage

Once the details solidified, the Water Street District project moved forward in early 2014 boasting a 50,800 SF commercial building, 215 residential apartments and town homes, and a parking deck to include nearly 600 parking spaces. The commercial building was completed in early 2015 with the lead tenant, PNC Bank, to build out their offices by mid-2015. On March 19, 2015, representatives from Crawford Hoying, Woodard Real Estate Resources and the City of Dayton held a formal groundbreaking ceremony for the residential component of the project.

== Housing and retail ==
- Ballpark Village plans also consisted of over 200 townhouses across the river by Deeds Point and retail shops to be built where the Parkside Homes now stand.
