= Muse Machine =

Muse Machine is an American arts education organization based in Dayton, Ohio, serving 77,000 students and 600 teachers across 13 different southwestern Ohio counties. Founded in 1982 by Suzanne Murray Bassani, the organization has produced many annual musicals and summer concerts, where students participate on stage, backstage, and in the orchestra. Bassani, a stage actress and festival organizer who had lived 18 years in Italy, established the organization after moving to Dayton, with help from locals Jean Woodhull and Frances Sullivan.

Muse Machine's first stage production was the play Once in a Lifetime, put on by Mountview Theatre School students who transported their production (and director) from London to the Victory Theater in Dayton.

A 501(c)(3) non-profit, in tax year 2022, Muse Machine had total revenues of $1.2 million and program service expenses of over $660,000, and net assets of nearly $6 million, under executive director, Ruth Reveal. The approach of the organization is to engage students through arts-integrated classroom instruction, interactive workshops, and professional development for teachers.

== Stage productions ==
1985: West Side Story

1986: Fiddler On The Roof

1987: Carousel

1988: Guys And Dolls

1989: The Wiz

1991: Oklahoma!

1992: South Pacific

1993: Oliver!

1994: Peter Pan

1995: The Music Man

1996: The Wizard Of Oz

1997: Me And My Girl

1998: Mame

1999: Damn Yankees

2000: My Favorite Year

2001: My Fair Lady

2002: The Pajama Game

2003: Guys And Dolls

2004: How To Succeed In Business Without Really Trying

2005: On The Town

2006: Beauty And The Beast

2007: Thoroughly Modern Millie

2008: Peter Pan

2009: Me And My Girl

2010: Singin' In The Rain

2011: Into The Woods

2012: The Wizard Of Oz

2013: Crazy For You

2014: Seussical

2015: Oliver!

2016: Mary Poppins

2017: Hairspray

2018: Hello, Dolly!

2019: Mamma Mia!

2020: In The Heights

2021: no show

2022: The Addams Family

2023: The Little Mermaid

2024: 9 to 5

2025: Cats

2026: Frozen
