= Dayton Philharmonic Orchestra =

The Dayton Philharmonic Orchestra (DPO) is a fully professional musical group in Dayton, Ohio, formed in 1933. It is a member of the League of American Orchestras (LAO) and the Regional Orchestra Players' Association (ROPA), and presents programs mainly of classical music, but also occasionally performs world music, pops, jazz and rock-n-roll.

Between September and May each year, the orchestra performs about 9 full-orchestra concert series, 4 chamber orchestra series, 4 operas with the Dayton Opera, 3 light family concerts, 4 Young People's Concerts, 6 SuperPops series, and several concerts for special occasions.

== History ==
The DPO has been housed in the Schuster Performing Arts Center since 2003. Prior to that, the orchestra played concerts at Dayton Memorial Hall, the Dayton Convention Center, and the Victoria Theatre. The orchestra has been led by Musical Director Neal Gittleman since 1995.

On May 30, 2024, Keitaro Harada was announced as the new Music and Artistic Director Designate for the 2024–2025 season, officially taking the helm as the orchestra's new leader beginning July 1, 2025. Harada made his DPO debut on April 5–6, 2024, guest conducting a concert entitled “Total Eclipse: The Sun and The Planets,” featuring Carl Nielsen's Helios Overture; Wolfgang Amadeus Mozart's Piano Concerto No. 16 in D and Louis Moreau Gottschalk's Grande Tarantelle for Piano and Orchestra, Op. 67 (both performed by pianist Richard Dowling); and Gustav Holst's The Planets.

=== Conductors ===
- 1933-1975 - Paul Katz
- 1975-1987 - Charles Wendelken-Wilson
- 1987-1994 - Isaiah Jackson
- 1994-2025 - Neal Gittleman
  - 2024-2025 Keitaro Harada (Music and Artistic Director Designate)
- 2025-present - Keitaro Harada

== Dayton Philharmonic Youth Orchestra ==
Founded in 1937 by Paul Katz, the DPYO is the 3rd oldest youth orchestra in the United States.

The DPYO performs three concerts each season and was invited to perform at the 2002, 2004, 2006, 2014, and 2018 Ohio Music Education Association conferences. The youth orchestra regularly appears on the Dayton Philharmonic's Family Concert Series, which in the past included collaborations with Cirque de la Symphonie, Zoot Theatre, the Dayton Ballet II Senior Company, performance artist Dan Kamin, and the Magic Circle Mime Company. The Dayton Philharmonic Youth Orchestra celebrated its 80th anniversary in the 2017–2018 season by commissioning composer Austin Jaquith to compose a work for the orchestra. The DPYO celebrated its 85th season in 2022–2023. As a “thank you” for twenty-five wonderful years on the podium, conductor Patrick Reynolds commissioned two works for the DPYO: “Thee Surrender” by Kamille Austin, and “The Phoenix Ascending: A New Beginning” by Stella Sung.

The DPYO is supported by the Dayton Performing Arts Alliance, Dayton Philharmonic Orchestra, the Association of Parents and Friends of the Dayton Philharmonic Youth Orchestra, and by the Dayton Philharmonic Volunteer Association. The DPYO is affiliated with the Youth Division of the League of American Orchestras.

=== Conductors ===
- 1937-1941 - Paul Katz
- 1941-1968 - Marjorie Kline
- 1968-1976 - Jaroslav Holesovsky
- 1976-1978 - Ken Miller
- 1978-1995 - William J. Steinohrt
- 1995-1999 - Peter Ciaschini
- 2000-2025 - Patrick Reynolds
- 2025-present - Maureen Hickey Haitch

== Dayton Philharmonic Youth Strings ==
The youth string orchestra is open for competitive audition for students of string instruments in grades 6 - 12. It was originally known as the Dayton Philharmonic Junior String Orchestra. The name was changed in 2011 to the Dayton Philharmonic Youth Strings.

=== Conductors ===
- 1982-1991 - William R. Scutt
- 1991-1998 - Xiao-Guang Zhu
- 1998-2009 - Karen Young
- 2009-2024 - Betsey Hofeldt
- 2024-present - Maureen Hickey Haitch

== Dayton Philharmonic Junior Strings ==
The Dayton Philharmonic Junior Strings was formed in 2014 for young string players not quite ready for the Dayton Philharmonic Youth Strings. The junior string orchestra is open for competitive audition for students of string instruments in grades 4–8.

=== Conductors ===
- 2014-2023 - Kara Camfield
- 2023-present - Michelle Mastin
