= Victoria Theatre (Dayton, Ohio) =

Theater in Dayton, Ohio, United States

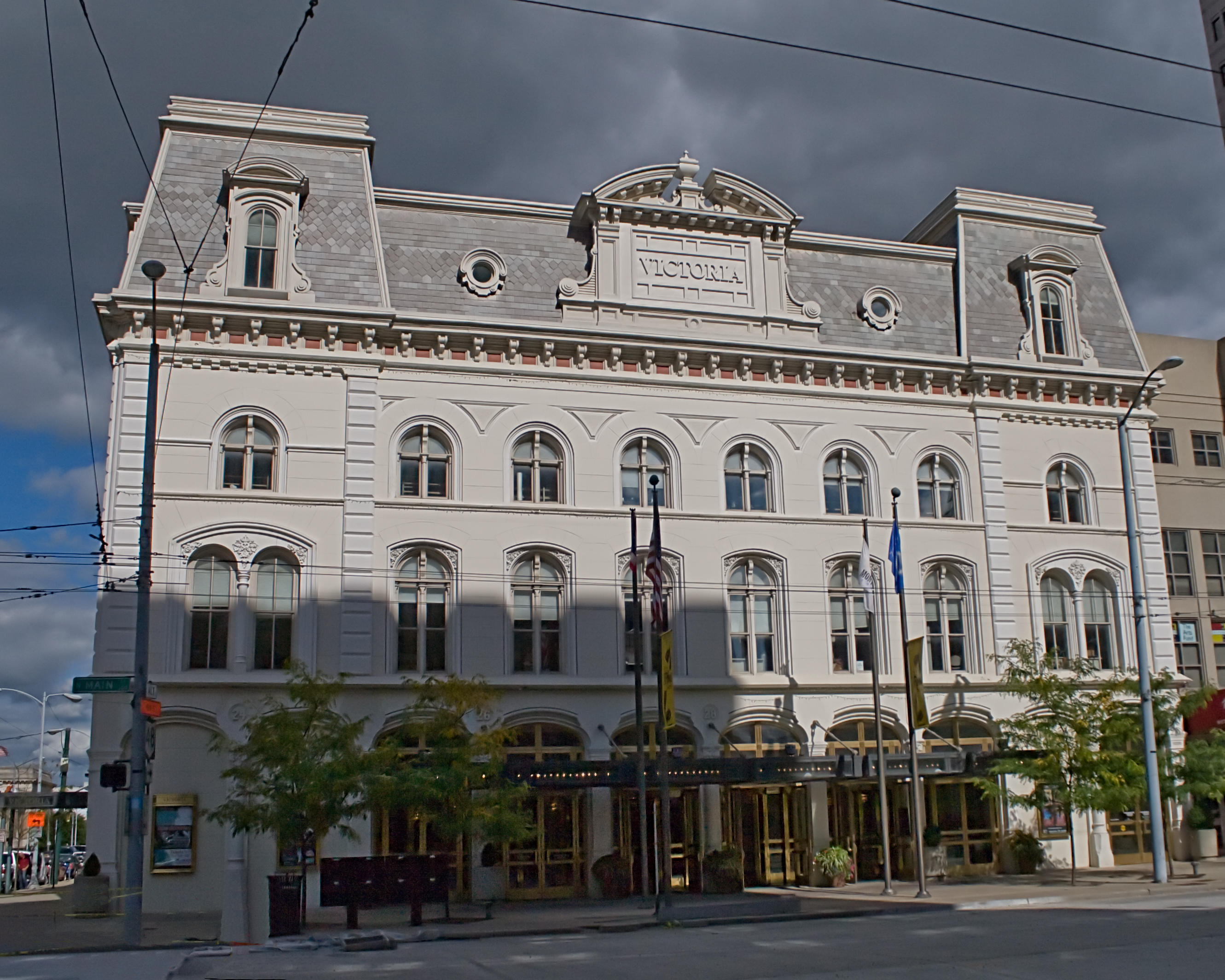
- Victoria Theatre in 2009
- Interactive map of Victoria Theatre
- Address: 138 North Main Street; Dayton, Ohio; United States
- Coordinates: 39.762181°N 84.192180°W
- Capacity: 1,154
- Type: Performing arts center

Construction
- Opened: January 1, 1866
- Victory Theater Building
- U.S. National Register of Historic Places
- Architectural style: Italianate
- NRHP reference No.: 72001037
- Added to NRHP: June 22, 1972

Website
- www.victoriatheatre.com

The Victoria Theatre is a historic 1,154-seat performing arts venue located in downtown Dayton, Ohio. The Victoria hosts a variety of events including theatre, music, dance, film, and comedy.

== History ==
The Victoria, one of the oldest continually operated theaters on the continent, was opened to the public as the Turner Opera House on New Year's Day, 1866. The first performance was the James Sheridan Knowles play Virginius, starring Edwin Forrest – the play was strongly associated with the famous actor. According to press clippings of that era, the theater was referred to as "the best theater west of Philadelphia". The theater's presence in Dayton even inspired the publishing of a musical march by Edward Spoth named after the opera house.

Arson was suspected of having caused an all-consuming fire May 16, 1869, which destroyed the theater at a loss of $500,000, of which insurance covered only $128,000.

In 1871, the edifice was re-opened – its rebuilding based, in part, on a portion of the surviving facade, although built to three stories instead of six. The opera house resumed operations as "The Music Hall". It in 1885 it became "The Grand Opera House". On September 18, 1899, it became the "Victoria Opera House", and in 1903, it became the Victoria Theatre, two years after the death of Queen Victoria of the United Kingdom.

Damage again befell The Victoria during the catastrophic Great Dayton Flood of 1913 which severely damaged the Dayton region along with the ground floor of the theater. The theater's interior was rebuilt and remodeled. But on January 16, 1918, fire struck again and gutted portions of the building. Reconstruction was delayed due to material shortages during World War I. Thus, after Armistice, The Victoria saw extensive interior remodeling and in 1919 re-opened as "The Victory Theatre" – a name commemorating the victorious American war effort. For decades, the theater was a major national embarkation point for traveling theater and stock companies. This included performances by Al Jolson, The Marx Brothers, Helen Hayes, Fannie Brice, George M. Cohan, Lynn Fontayne, Gertrude Lawrence, Alfred Lunt, Harry Houdini, and many others.

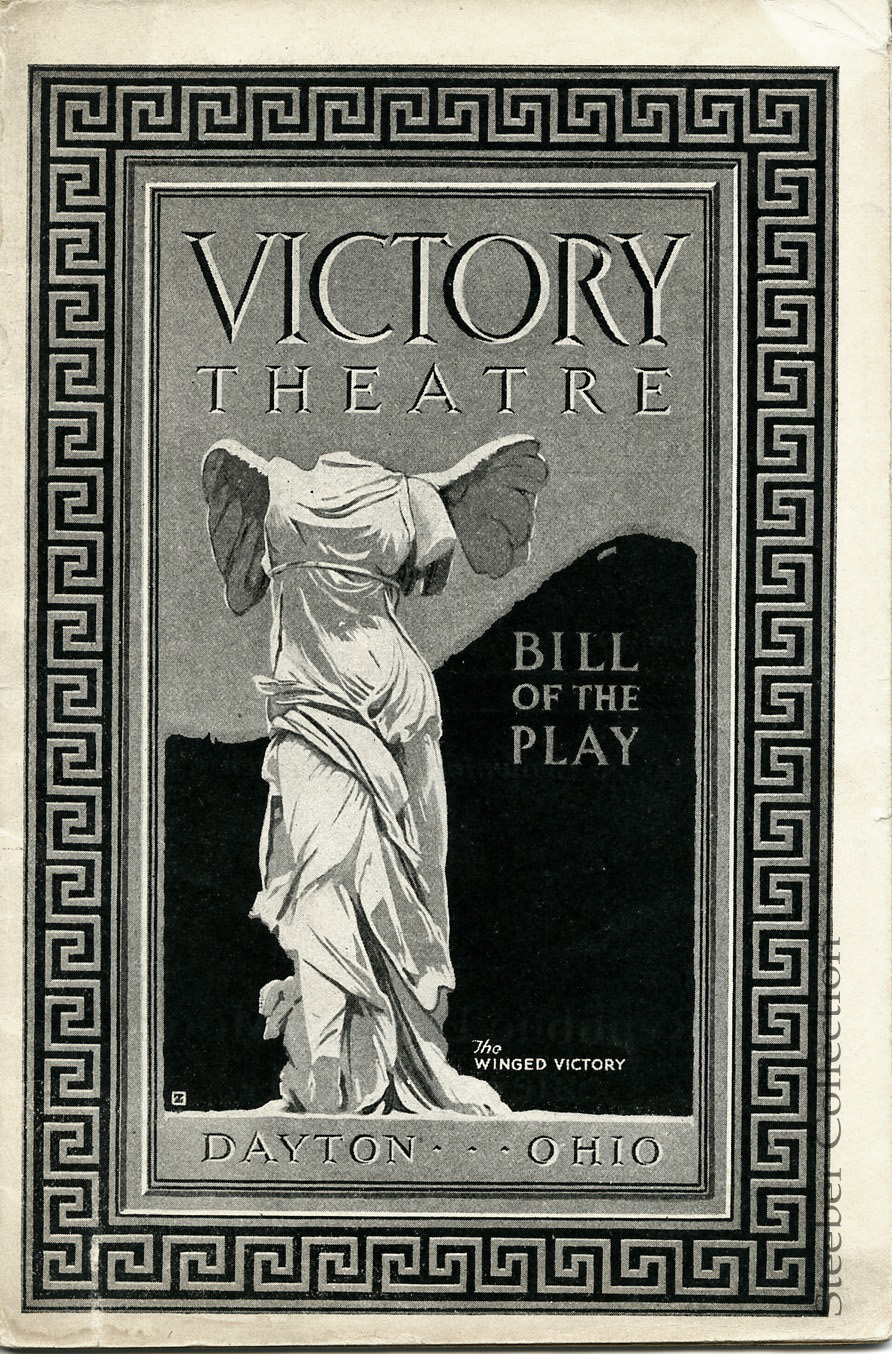
A Victory Theatre Playbill Cover from 1919

In 1930, the Victory Theatre was outfitted for talking pictures, in its effort to continue as a full-service cinema house. In the 1950s and 1960s, it was the home of pictures from Walt Disney's company, as well as other studios' family fare.

By the late 1960s, Dayton's changing business patterns Downtown and the proliferation of freeways and suburban shopping malls threatened the Victory Theater's existence, and in 1975 it was slated for demolition, in favor of a proposed parking lot. A public outcry for the theater's preservation that year helped to earn the building its listing in the National Register of Historic Places and, thus, it escaped demolition. However, portions of the building were in poor or fading condition. A group of young volunteers raised funds and did the early renovation work themselves to prevent demolition.

Back in the day, the theatre had a network of access tunnels stretching out beneath the city's streets for several blocks. It was said that, during Vaudeville times, the tunnels allowed circus animals to be unloaded from railroad cars blocks away from the theatre, and held underground until showtime. As late as 1979, much of the tunnel network was accessible to employees, although some sections were blocked off by city steam pipes. The stage also bore remnants of its original gas footlights.

Throughout the 1970s, the theater was operated as "The Victory Theater". It staged legitimate theatrical shows, rock concerts and movies. The theatre was also home to the nationally known Dayton Ballet Company. A mainstay through the period was its screening of "Midnight Movies", offered by a local independent producer, on Friday and Saturday nights that drew a, largely, teen audience for films with counter-cultural themes.

During revitalization efforts in the late 1970s, the stage manager, Gary Kuzkin, overhauled much of the stage's technical capabilities. Crews from the Stagehands Union (IATSE) local restored much of the theatre's ancient hemp-and-sandbag fly galley, replacing several hundred thousand feet of rope—along with miles of electrical wiring.

In 1978, the theatre was greatly benefited by the donation of a cache of equipment and stage draperies from National Cash Register's (NCR) auditorium, which had been slated for demolition. NCR also donated its historic five-rank Estay pipe organ to the Victory, which was renovated and installed by aficionados. In 1986, Virginia Kettering donated $7 million to fund a downtown arts center, conditioning her donation on the requirement that the center include the Victory Theater and be located within the same one-block area.

All the while, it continued to be visited extensively by traveling theater companies. Choreographer Twyla Tharp used the Victory as a try-out venue for various productions before taking the material to the East Coast. A popular vintage film series drew patrons during the summertime and featured pipe organ house music and silent film accompaniment, thanks to the acquisition of an NCR-donated Estey pipe organ.

The 1989 the theatre was closed due to the extensive renovation. It involved razing the interior commercial space within the forward, Main Street-facing section of the building as well as the stage house, while carefully preserving and restoring the 1866–71 facade and the 1919 auditorium. At the same time, the interior auditorium portion of the structure was completely renovated. All of the commercial space at street level was reclaimed for a grand, new lobby. The result was an extensively-new Victoria Theatre (as it was now so renamed) designed expressly for the performing arts. The auditorium retained its original appearance with completely restored plaster work, drapery, marble work, gilding, and fresco detailing. Additionally, the house received state-of-the-art upgrading to its wiring, lighting, and sound systems and now accommodated infrared sound transmitters for headphone use.

The current theater accommodates 1,154, with 635 seats in the orchestra, and 519 in the balcony. The proscenium measures 37'7" wide by 29'0" high by 39'3" deep. A full-sized orchestra pit lies just below the stage lip. Ten dressing rooms, accommodating up to 18 people, are off-stage left, in the basement and at stage level.

In 2003, the Benjamin and Marian Schuster Performing Arts Center, under the operation of The Victoria Theatre Association, opened as another venue to house the Associations larger Broadway productions as well as large acts. The Dayton Philharmonic, the Dayton Opera, and the Dayton Ballet also rent the building for their performances. These two venues along with the Metropolitan Arts Center, which is a renovated former department store building next to the Victoria Theatre, are able to hold a variety of performances of any size and is the heart of the performing arts district in Downtown Dayton.

== Dayton Live ==
Dayton Live (formerly the Victoria Theatre Association) is the non-profit arts organization that owns and operates the Benjamin & Marian Schuster Performing Arts Center, Victoria Theatre, the PNC Arts Annex (opened in 2018), and the Metropolitan Arts Center (home of The Loft Theatre) for the benefit of the community and the arts organizations that use them. They also own and operate Starbucks at the Schuster and The Arts Garage. Dayton Live presents over 300 performances for all ages each year, including touring Broadway, stand-up comedy, concerts, films, and family shows, as well as educational programs. Independent not-for-profit arts organizations that call Dayton Live venues home include the Dayton Contemporary Dance Company, Dayton Dance Initiative, Dayton Performing Arts Association (Dayton Ballet, Dayton Opera, Dayton Philharmonic), Muse Machine, and The Human Race Theatre Association.

The Victoria Theatre Association and Ticket Center Stage unveiled its new name, Dayton Live, at an open house event on March 10, 2020, at the Schuster Center. The organization also debuted its new website, DaytonLive.org. Dayton Live is an umbrella name covering all four venues, The Victoria Theatre, The Schuster Performing Arts Center, Loft Theatre, and the PNC Arts Annex, and also includes Ticket Center Stage. Its tagline is "Bringing you the best theatre and event experiences in the Dayton Region, Your Home for Arts, Culture & Entertainment".

"Dayton Live evokes the energy of live events while boldly declaring that our thriving downtown community is the region's home for the arts, culture, and entertainment," said Ty Sutton, president, and CEO.

With new branding just weeks before COVID-19 shut down venues nationwide, Dayton Live managed to keep operations afloat while laying off hundreds of personnel. In 2021 while awaiting the Small Business Administration Shuttered Venue Operator Grant, Sutton says on April 26, 2021, Dayton Live was finally able to submit its application, nearly four months after the legislation was passed.

But since then, venue owners are struggling to get the money partly due to rigorous fraud checks between the SBA and IRS.

"They're worried about fraud at the expense of giving the money back to the people that rightly deserve it," Sutton said. "We have to let legislators know they have to do this and they have to do it quickly."

As the pandemic has waned, operations have been building back up to full capacity with a full slate of entertainment offerings for 2022.

== See also ==
- Benjamin and Marian Schuster Performing Arts Center
- National Register of Historic Places listings in Dayton, Ohio
