= McLin =

McLin or McLinn is a surname. Notable people with the surname include:

== McLin ==
- Benjamin E. McLin (1851–1912), American lawyer, businessman and politician
- C. J. McLin (1921–1988), American politician
- Claude McLin (1925–1995), American jazz tenor saxophonist
- Jimmy McLin (1908–1983), American jazz banjoist and guitarist
- Ladell McLin, American musician
- Lena McLin (1928–2023), American composer and writer
- Mac McLin (1899–1966), American civil rights activist and politician
- Rhine McLin (born 1948), American politician
- Samuel B. McLin, American politician
- Stephen McLin (born 1946), American banking executive and philanthropist

== McLinn ==
- Brooklyn McLinn, American actor and basketball player

== See also ==
- McLin Glacier, a glacier of Antarctica
