= 2025 Dayton mayoral election =

- November 4, 2025
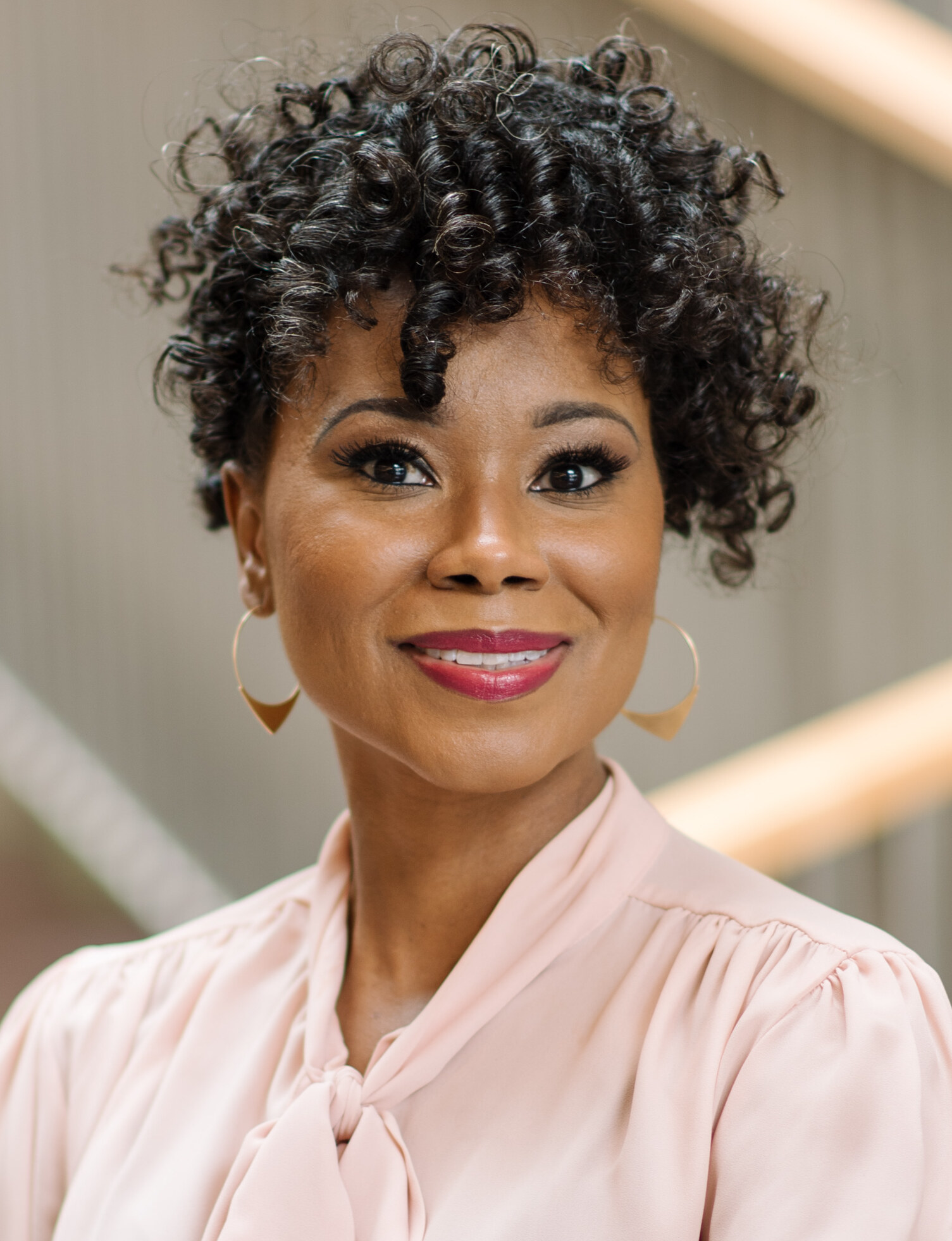

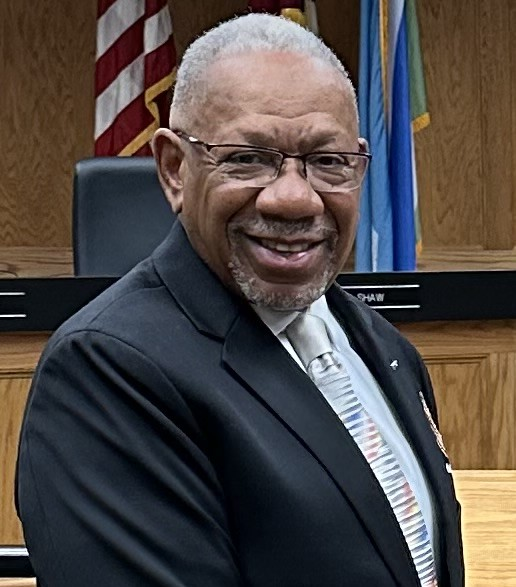
Candidate	Shenise Turner-Sloss	Jeff Mims
Party	Democratic	Democratic
Popular vote	8,541	7,926
Percentage	51.87%	48.13%
Mayor before election
Jeff Mims
Democratic
Elected mayor
Shenise Turner-Sloss
Democratic

The 2025 Dayton mayoral election was held on November 4, 2025. Incumbent Mayor Jeff Mims, who was first elected in 2021, narrowly lost the election to challenger Shenise Turner-Sloss.

== Candidates ==
=== Advanced to general ===
- Jeff Mims, incumbent mayor
- Shenise Turner-Sloss, city commissioner

== Endorsements ==
Jeff Mims

Organizations

- Ohio Environmental Council
- Planned Parenthood Southwest Ohio

Labor unions

- International Association of Fire Fighters Local 136
Shenise Turner-Sloss

Labor unions

- National Association of Social Workers Ohio

Organizations

- Our Revolution
- Ohio High School Democrats of America

Political parties

- Working Families Party Ohio

== Results ==
2025 Dayton mayoral election results
Candidate	Votes	%
Shenise Turner-Sloss	8,383	51.84%
Jeff Mims (incumbent)	7,787	48.16%
Total votes	16,170	100.00%
