= Tony P. Hall =

American politician (born 1942)

Tony Hall
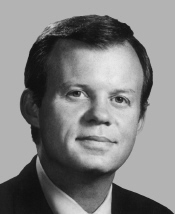

7th United States Ambassador to United Nations Agencies for Food and Agriculture
- In office September 12, 2002 – April 5, 2006
- President: George W. Bush
- Preceded by: George McGovern
- Succeeded by: Gaddi Vasquez

Member of the U.S. House of Representatives from Ohio's 3rd district
- In office January 3, 1979 – September 9, 2002
- Preceded by: Charles W. Whalen Jr.
- Succeeded by: Mike Turner

Member of the Ohio Senate from the 6th district
- In office January 3, 1973 – January 1, 1979
- Preceded by: David Holcomb
- Succeeded by: Chuck Curran

Member of the Ohio House of Representatives from the 87th district
- In office January 3, 1969 – December 31, 1972
- Preceded by: Robert Roderer
- Succeeded by: Paul Leonard

Personal details
- Born: Tony Patrick Hall; January 16, 1942 (age 84) Dayton, Ohio, U.S.
- Party: Democratic
- Spouse: Janet Sue Dick (m. 1973)
- Children: 2
- Relatives: Dave Hall (father); Sam Hall (brother)
- Education: Denison University (BA)

Tony Patrick Hall (born January 16, 1942) is an American politician, businessman, and diplomat who served as a member of the U.S. House of Representatives, representing Ohio's 3rd congressional district from 1979 to 2002. Hall had previously served in both chambers of the Ohio General Assembly during the years 1969 to 1979.

From 2002 to 2006, Hall served as United States Ambassador to the United Nations Agencies for Food and Agriculture, and as chief of the United States Mission to the UN Agencies in Rome, which includes the Food and Agriculture Organization of the United Nations (FAO), the World Food Programme, and the International Fund for Agricultural Development. Subsequently, Hall worked on a Middle East peace initiative in collaboration with the Center for the Study of the Presidency.

== Early life and education ==
Hall was born in Dayton, Ohio. His father, Dave Hall, served as a Republican mayor of Dayton.

Hall graduated from Fairmont High School in Kettering, Ohio, in 1960. He received a bachelor's degree from Denison University in 1964. While in college, Hall was named Little All-American football tailback and the Ohio Conference's Most Valuable Player (1963).

== Career ==
After college, Hall served as Peace Corps Volunteer in Thailand, teaching English in 1966 and 1967, an experience that contributed to his strong interest in world hunger issues. He also worked in the real estate business.

=== Ohio Legislature ===
Hall became active in politics, joining the Democratic Party in a change from his father's affiliation. He was elected as a member of the Ohio House of Representatives, serving from 1969 to 1973, and as an Ohio state senator from 1973 to 1979.

In 1974, Hall ran for Ohio Secretary of State and lost to Republican incumbent Ted W. Brown.

=== U.S. Representative ===
Hall was first elected to the U.S. House of Representatives in 1978, to succeed 12-year incumbent Charles W. Whalen Jr., a moderate Republican. He won election with 54 percent of the vote, but would never face another contest anywhere near that close. He would be reelected 11 more times, never dropping below 57 percent of the vote. As a measure of how popular he was in the Dayton area, he was unopposed for reelection in 1984 even as Ronald Reagan carried the district in a landslide. He was unopposed again in 1990, and faced no major-party opposition in 1982 and 2000.

In the 1980s, Hall became an evangelical Christian, prompting him to change his position on abortion from abortion rights to anti-abortion. Otherwise, his voting record was liberal.

During his tenure in Congress, Hall concentrated on seeking to alleviate world hunger. He made frequent trips to more than 100 countries such as Sierra Leone, Ethiopia, Sudan, and North Korea where hunger was widespread. He was chairman of the Select Committee on Hunger from 1989 to 1993. When the committee was abolished, Hall fasted for 22 days in protest. He was founder of the Congressional Friends of Human Rights Monitors and the Congressional Hunger Center. Hall served terms on the foreign affairs and small business committees before being appointed to the House Rules Committee in 1981.

Twice during his tenure as U.S. representative, Hall introduced legislation that would have apologized for slavery in the United States.

Hall was an Ohio delegate to the 2000 Democratic National Convention.

=== U.S. Ambassador ===
Hall served in the House into 2002, when President George W. Bush nominated him to succeed George McGovern as United States Ambassador to the United Nations Agencies for Food and Agriculture. Hall's confirmation to the post was held up in the Senate for several months, but he was confirmed and sworn into the post in September 2002 by U.S. Secretary of State Colin Powell.

He served in this position until 2006, leading as chief of the United States Mission to the UN Agencies in Rome, which includes the Food and Agriculture Organization of the United Nations (FAO), the World Food Programme, and the International Fund for Agricultural Development.

=== Later career ===
With Tom Price, Hall wrote Changing the Face of Hunger: One Man's Story of How Liberals, Conservatives, Democrats, Republicans, and People of Faith Are Joining Forces to Help the Hungry, the Poor, and the Oppressed (2007).

In March 2007, Hall announced he was committed to fostering a Middle East peace initiative, by working with the Center for the Study of the Presidency and Congress and religious leaders of the Holy Land, principally among Muslims, Christians and Jews in the Middle East. Under a $1 million grant from U.S. Secretary of State Condoleezza Rice via the U.S. Agency for International Development, to be applied to both economics and faith-based efforts, Hall was to work with religious leaders to help prepare the way for peace in the Middle East. Hall received no salary for his work.

He serves as executive director emeritus of The Alliance to End Hunger. Hall also serves on the Board of Advisors of Opportunity International, a charity that seeks to end poverty through microcredit lending to entrepreneurs.

Hall remains active fighting hunger in his hometown of Dayton. In 2015, he created the Hall Hunger Initiative, a Dayton-based nonprofit working to “create a just and equitable food system."He also served as the Capital Chair for the Gem City Market, a co-op grocery store, and led a successful effort to raise $5 million.

=== Recognition ===
Ambassador Hall was nominated for the Nobel Peace Prize for 1998, 1999 and 2001 for his humanitarian and hunger-related work. For his hunger legislation and for his proposal for a Humanitarian Summit in the Horn of Africa, Ambassador Hall and the Hunger Committee received the 1992 Silver World Food Day Medal from the UN Food and Agriculture Organization. Ambassador Hall is a recipient of the United States Committee for UNICEF 1995 Children's Legislative Advocate Award, U.S. AID Presidential End Hunger Award, 1992 Oxfam America Partners Award, Bread for the World Distinguished Service Against Hunger Award, and NCAA Silver Anniversary Award. He received honorary Doctor of Laws degrees from Asbury College, Antioch College and Eastern College and a Doctor of Humane Letters degree from Loyola College in Baltimore.

== Personal life ==
Hall and his wife, Janet Sue Dick, were married in 1973. They had two children together, Jyl Hall and Matthew Hall. Matthew died in 1996, at age 15, of leukemia.

== See also ==
- List of United States political appointments that crossed party lines
- List of United States representatives from Ohio

Party political offices
Preceded by John Kennedy	Democratic nominee for Secretary of State of Ohio; 1974	Succeeded by Anthony J. Celebrezze Jr.
U.S. House of Representatives
Preceded by Charles W. Whalen Jr.	Member of the U.S. House of Representatives from Ohio's 3rd congressional district 1979–2002	Succeeded by Mike Turner
Diplomatic posts
Preceded by George McGovern	United States Ambassador to the United Nations Agencies for Food and Agriculture; 2002–2006	Succeeded by Gaddi Vasquez
U.S. order of precedence (ceremonial)
Preceded by John S. Tanner as Former U.S. Representative	Order of precedence of the United States as Former U.S. Representative	Succeeded by Bob Livingston as Former U.S. Representative
