= Politics of Dayton, Ohio =

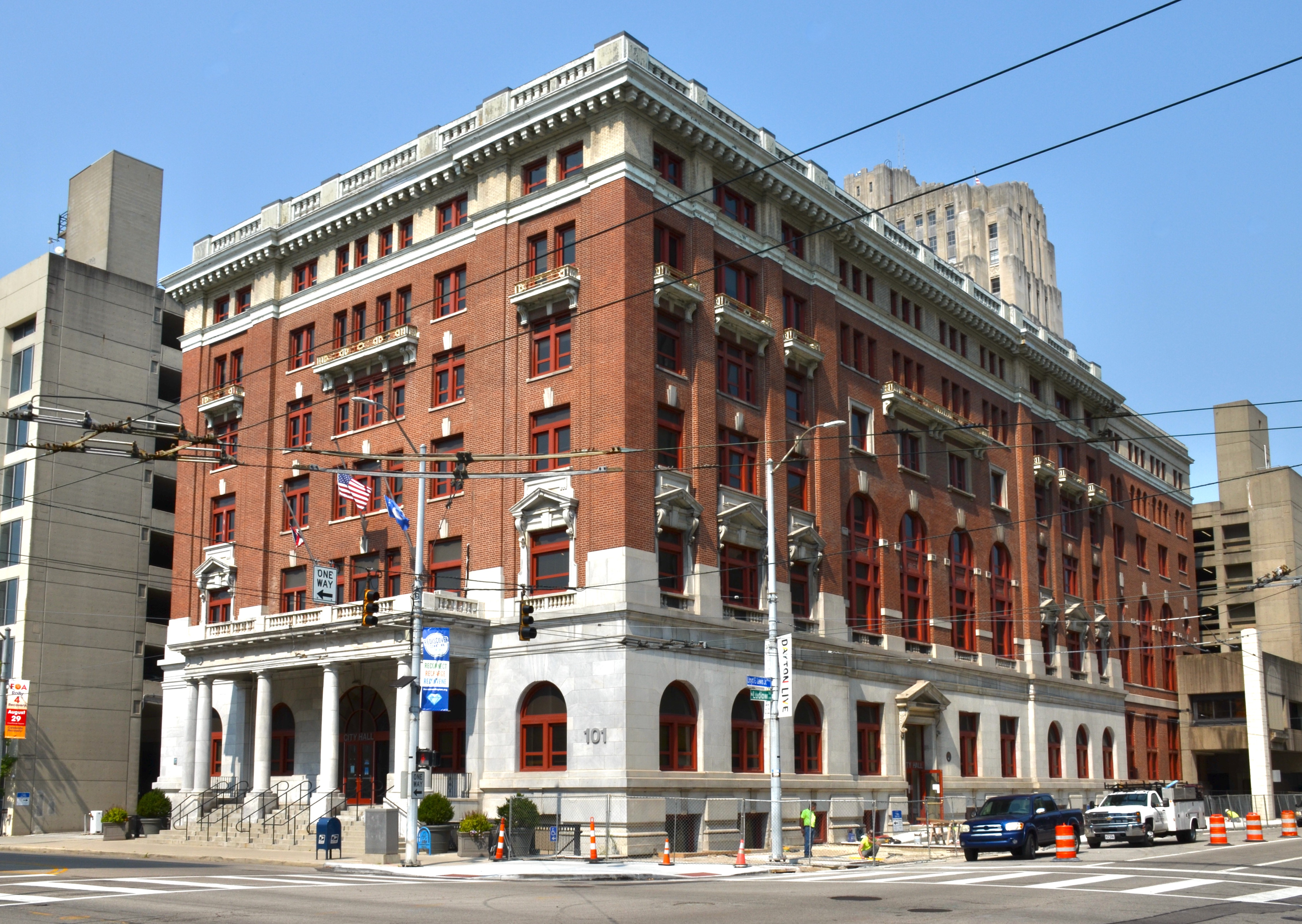
Dayton City Hall in 2021

Since its creation as a town in the 18th century, the Politics of Dayton, Ohio have adapted to and reflected the changing needs of the community, from the Miami and Erie Canal through the World War II "Dayton Project" to the present day.

== City Commissioners ==
The city government of Dayton, Ohio, is governed by a city commission comprising five commissioners, one of whom is the mayor. The commissioners serve staggered, four-year terms. Commissioners are elected two at a time in open, at-large, nonpartisan elections. The four top vote-getters in the primary election go on to compete in the general election, regardless of party membership. The top two vote-getters in the general election are elected. As of November 1969, the mayor is elected in a separate election. Although the elections are nominally nonpartisan, the Democratic and Republican parties nominate candidates.

== Commission Seats 1 and 2 ==
Year	Winning candidates	Losing candidates
2015	Chris Shaw (D) Matt Joseph (D)	Scott Sliver (I) Darryl Fairchild (D) Hazel Roundtree (D)
2011	Matt Joseph (D): 17,711; Dean A. Lovelace (D): 17,874	Mark Manovich: 7,270; William Pace: 5,525
2007	Matt Joseph (D): ? Dean A. Lovelace (D): ?	unopposed
2003	Matt Joseph (D): 15,666; Dean A. Lovelace (D): 13,974	Idotha Bootsie Neal (D): 8,748; Lorana M. Kelly (D): 8,145
1999	Dean A. Lovelace (D): 12,164; Idotha Bootsie Neal (D):10,212	David Esrati (ind.): 6,093; John C. Drake (disqualified)
1995	Dean A. Lovelace (D): 18,286; Idotha Bootsie Neal (D): 16,721	Pam Miller Howard (R): 10,285; Jeff Baugham (R): 8,351
1993s	Dean A. Lovelace (D): 15,432	Judy Orick (R): 12,291; Mary Sue Kessler (D): 10,516; David Esrati (ind.): 1,466; Louis D. Butler: 612; Derek Folley: 593
1991	R. Mark Henry (D): 18,043; Idotha Bootsie Neal (D): 12,179	Charles McCracken (ind.): 9,312; Darren Cooper (R): 6,306
1987	R. Mark Henry (D); Abner J. Orick (R)	
1985s	Abner J. Orick (R)	
1983	Patricia M. Roach (D); R. Mark Henry (D)	Abner J. Orick (R)
1979	Patricia M. Roach (D); Abner J. Orick (R)	
1979s	Abner J. Orick (R)	
1975	Patricia M. Roach (D); Michael L. Schierloh (D)	
1975s	Michael L. Schierloh (D)	
1973s	Gail Levin	
1971	John C. Smith; Paul B. Roderer	

== Commission Seats 3 and 4 ==
Year	Winning candidates	Losing candidates
2013	Joey D. Williams (D): 10,333 Jeffrey J. Mims, Jr. (D): 8,698	David K. Greer: 4,687 David Esrati (D): 4,394
2009	Joey D. Williams (D): 16,937 Nan Whaley (D): 17,066	David Esrati (D): 9,197
2005	Joey D. Williams (D): 21,149 Nan Whaley (D): 16,874	Lorana M. Kelly (D): 10,326
2001	Joey D. Williams (D): 19,933 Richard A. Zimmer (D): 19,151	Mike P. Osgood (R): 14,921 Abner J. Orick (R): 9,038
2001s	Edythe Lewis (D): 4,842	Abner J. Orick (R): 2,524
1997	Mary L. Wiseman (D): 19,641; Lloyd E. Lewis Jr. (D): 17,493	Abner J. Orick (R): 15,340; Mike P. Osgood (R): 13,633
1996s	Abner J. Orick (R): 6,902	Bill Evans (D): 4,517; Mark P. Donelson II (D): 2,824; Mike P. Osgood (R): 2,301
1993	Anthony Capizzi (D): 27,169; Richard A. Zimmer (D): 26,277	William Augman: 10,767; Mark P. Donelson II (D): 8,693
1989	Anthony Capizzi (D); Richard A. Zimmer (D)	
1987s	Richard A. Zimmer (D)	
1985	Richard Clay Dixon (D); Anthony Capizzi (D)	
1981	Richard Clay Dixon (D); Richard A. Zimmer (D)	
1979s	Richard Clay Dixon (D)	
1977	Charles J. Curran (D); Richard A. Zimmer (D)	
1973	Charles J. Curran (D); Fred E. Weber (D)	
1970s	Charles J. Curran (D)	
1969	James H. McGee (D); Thomas B. Andrews	

=== 1820 to 1828 ===
From 1820 to 1828, Dayton was governed by a seven-member city council headed by a council president.

Date	Council president
1820	H. G. Phillips
1821	M. Patton
1822	(no record)
1823	J. H. Conover
1824	J. Compert

Date	Council president
1825	S. Broadwell
1826	E. Brabham
1827	Dr. J. Steele
1828	Dr. J. Steele

=== 1829 to 1913 ===
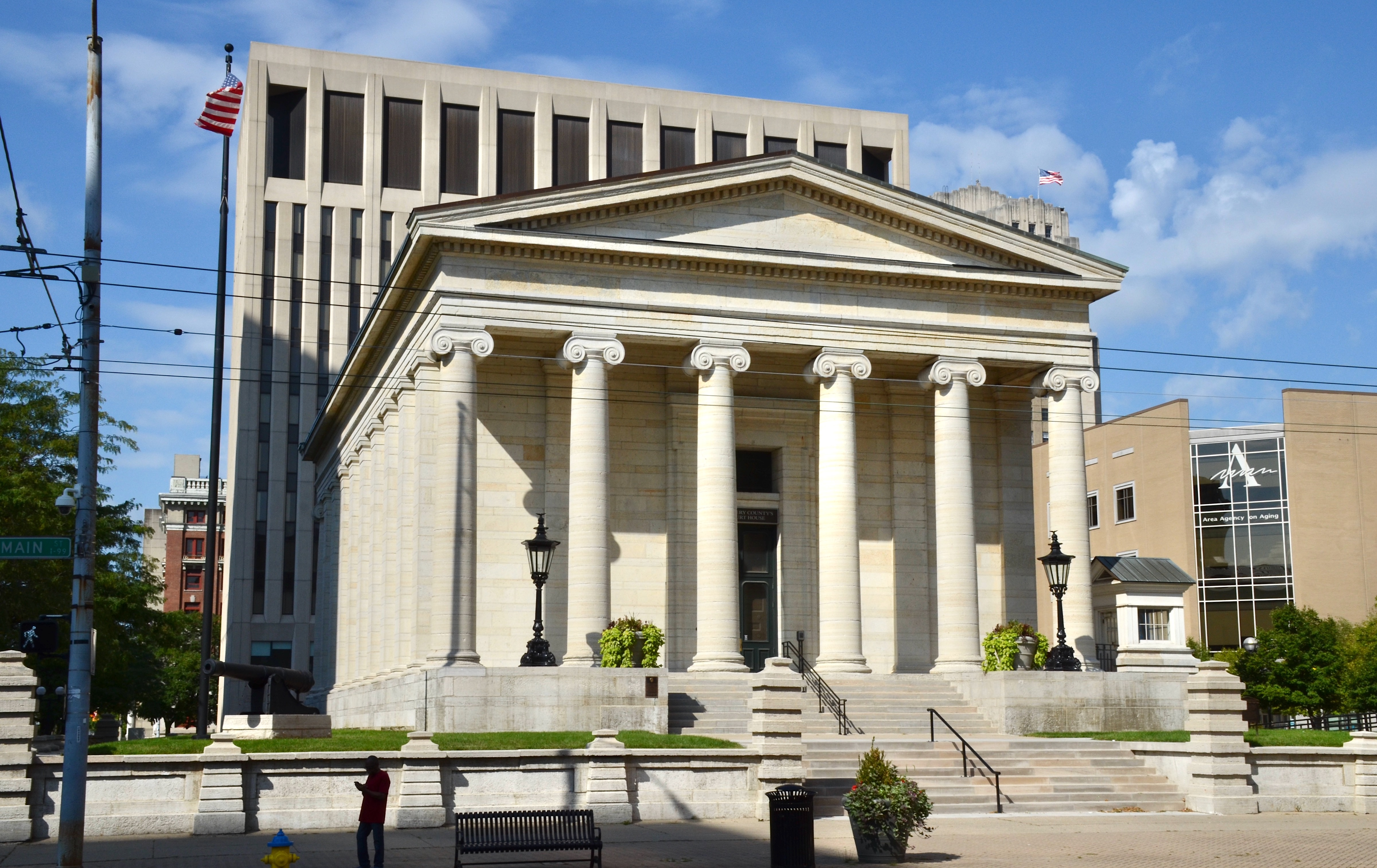
Old county courthouse, an example of Greek Revival architecture; completed in 1850.

From 1829 to 1913, Dayton was governed by a seven-member city council headed by a mayor.

Dates	Mayor
1829	J. Folkerth
1830	J. W. VanCleve
1831	J. W. VanCleve
1832	J. W. VanCleve
1833	Dr. Job Haines
1834	H. Stoddard
1835	J. Anderson
1836	D. W. Weelock
1837	D. W. Weelock
1838	D. W. Weelock
1839	W. J. McKinney
1840	W. J. McKinney
1841	W. J. McKinney
1841	Morris Seely
1842	G. C. Davis
1843	(data needed)
1844	(data needed)
1845	W. J. McKinney
1846	J. H. Achey
1847	G. W. Bambarger
1848	J. Howard
1849	(data needed)

Dates	Mayor
1850	A. Decker
1851	J. Howard
1852	J. Howard
1853	J. Howard
1854	George M. Young
1855	George M. Young
1856	D. W. Iddings
1857	D. W. Iddings
1858	D. W. Iddings
1859	George M. Young
1860	W. H. Gillespie
1861	D. W. Iddings
1862	W. H. Gillespie
1863	W. H. Gillespie
1864	E. C. Ellis
1865	W. H. Gillespie
1866	J. Kenney
1867	E. C. Ellis
1868	C. L. Baumann
1869	J. Kenney
1870	C. L. Baumann
1871	J. D. Morrison
1872	J. D. Morrison
1873	W. H. Sigman
1874	W. H. Sigman

Date	Mayor
1875	L. Butz
1876	W. H. Rouzer
1877	W. H. Rouzer
1878	L. Butz
1879	L. Butz
1880	F. M. Hosier
1881	F. M. Hosier
1882	J. H. Miller
1883	J. H. Miller
1884	J. Bettelon
1885	J. Bettelon
1886	Ira Crawford
1887	Ira Crawford
1888	Ira Crawford
1889	Ira Crawford
1890	J. E. D. Ward
1891	J. E. D. Ward
1892	C. G. McMillen
1893	C. G. McMillen
1894	C. G. McMillen
1895	C. G. McMillen
1896	C. G. McMillen
1897	J. Linxweiler
1898	J. Linxweiler

Dates	Mayor
1899	J. R. Lindemuth
1900	J. R. Lindemuth
1901	J. R. Lindemuth
1902	J. R. Lindemuth
1903	C. A. Snyder
1904	C. A. Snyder
1905	C. A. Snyder
1906	C. A. Snyder
1906	C. D. Wright
1907	C. D. Wright
1908	E. E. Burkhart
1909	E. E. Burkhart
1910	E. E. Burkhart
1911	E. E. Burkhart
1912	Edward Phillips
1913	Edward Phillips

=== 1914 to 1969 ===
Starting in 1914, Dayton's government was changed to the "weak mayor" manager-council form. In this system, the five-member commission selects the city manager, who holds administrative authority over the municipal government. The mayor is simply one of the five members of the city commission. The mayor's only power over the other commissioners is as chairperson of the commission.

Bold type indicates mayor.

Year	1	2	3	4	5
1914	J. M. Switzer	J. R. Flotron	J. A. McGee	A. I. Mendenhall	**G. W. Shroyer**
1915	J. M. Switzer	J. R. Flotron	J. A. McGee	A. I. Mendenhall	**G. W. Shroyer**
1916	J. M. Switzer	J. R. Flotron	Henry Hiddesen	A. I. Mendenhall	**G. W. Shroyer**
1917	J. M. Switzer	J. R. Flotron	Henry Hiddesen	A. I. Mendenhall	**G. W. Shroyer**
1918	**J. M. Switzer**	J. R. Flotron	Henry Hiddesen	A. I. Mendenhall	G. W. Shroyer
1919	**J. M. Switzer**	J. R. Flotron	Henry Hiddesen	A. I. Mendenhall	G. W. Shroyer
1920	**J. M. Switzer**	L. Wright	Henry Hiddesen	A. I. Mendenhall	G. W. Shroyer
1921	**J. M. Switzer**	L. Wright	Henry Hiddesen	O. B. Kneisly	David L. Stanze
1922	**F. B. Hale**	L. Wright	Henry Hiddesen	O. B. Kneisly	David L. Stanze
1923	**F. B. Hale**	L. Wright	Henry Hiddesen	O. B. Kneisly	David L. Stanze
1924	**F. B. Hale**	L. Wright	Henry Hiddesen	O. B. Kneisly	David L. Stanze
1925	**F. B. Hale**	L. Wright	Henry Hiddesen	O. B. Kneisly	David L. Stanze
1926	**Allen C. McDonald**	L. Wright	Henry Hiddesen	George W. Bish	C. H. Paul
1927	**Allen C. McDonald**	L. Wright	Henry Hiddesen	George W. Bish	C. H. Paul
1928	**Allen C. McDonald**	H. N. Ballman	Henry Hiddesen	George W. Bish	C. H. Paul
1929	**Allen C. McDonald**	H. N. Ballman	Henry Hiddesen (died 1 January 1929; Karl F. Kroemer (24 April 1929)	George W. Bish	C. H. Paul
1930	**Allen C. McDonald**	H. N. Ballman	Karl F. Kroemer	George W. Bish	David L. Stanze
1931	**Allen C. McDonald**	H. N. Ballman	Karl F. Kroemer	George W. Bish	David L. Stanze
1932	**Allen C. McDonald**	John E. Breidenbach	Charles A. Bracher	George W. Bish	David L. Stanze
1933	**Allen C. McDonald**	John E. Breidenbach	Charles A. Bracher	George W. Bish	David L. Stanze
1934	Frank M. Krebs	John E. Breidenbach	Charles A. Bracher	Frank H. Irelan	**Charles J. Brennan**
1935	Frank M. Krebs	John E. Breidenbach	Charles A. Bracher	Frank H. Irelan	**Charles J. Brennan**
1936	Frank M. Krebs	John E. Breidenbach	Arthur C. Stock	Frank H. Irelan	**Charles J. Brennan**
1937	Frank M. Krebs	John E. Breidenbach	Arthur C. Stock	Frank H. Irelan	**Charles J. Brennan**
1938	Frank M. Krebs	John E. Breidenbach	Arthur C. Stock	John F. Ahlers	**Charles J. Brennan**
1939	Frank M. Krebs	John E. Breidenbach	Arthur C. Stock	John F. Ahlers	**Charles J. Brennan**
1940	Frank M. Krebs	Harry J. Munger	Fred A. Speice	John F. Ahlers	**Charles J. Brennan**
1941	Frank M. Krebs	Harry J. Munger	Fred A. Speice	John F. Ahlers	**Charles J. Brennan**
1942	**Frank M. Krebs**	Harry J. Munger	Fred A. Speice	John F. Ahlers	Kurt Roehll
1943	**Frank M. Krebs**	Harry J. Munger	Fred A. Speice	John F. Ahlers	Kurt Roehll
1944	**Frank M. Krebs**	Harry J. Munger (resigned 6 December 1944)	Fred A. Speice	John F. Ahlers	Kurt Roehll
1945	**Frank M. Krebs**	Charles E. Smith (1 January 1945)	Fred A. Speice	John F. Ahlers	Kurt Roehll
1946	Louis W. Lohrey	Charles E. Smith	Fred A. Speice	Herbert L. Neth	**Edward G. Breen** (D)
1947	Louis W. Lohrey	Charles E. Smith	Fred A. Speice	Herbert L. Neth	**Edward G. Breen** (D)
1948	Louis W. Lohrey; **Mayor** as of 15 April 1948	Charles E. Smith	Fred A. Speice	Herbert L. Neth	**Edward G. Breen** (D) (resigned 15 April 1948); Merle P. Smith; 14 April 1948
1949	**Louis W. Lohrey**	Charles E. Smith (died 19 March 1949); John C. Csipkar; 6 April 1949	Fred A. Speice	Herbert L. Neth	Merle P. Smith
1950	**Louis W. Lohrey**	John C. Csipkar	Fred A. Speice	Jack D. Reeder	Merle P. Smith
1951	**Louis W. Lohrey**	John C. Csipkar	Fred A. Speice	Jack D. Reeder	Merle P. Smith
1952	**Louis W. Lohrey**	John C. Csipkar	Howard R. Malone	Jack D. Reeder	Merle P. Smith
1953	**Louis W. Lohrey**	John C. Csipkar	Howard R. Malone	Jack D. Reeder (resigned 10 June 1953; Henry S. Stout (17 June 1953)	Merle P. Smith
1954	R. William Patterson (D)	John C. Csipkar	Howard R. Malone	**Henry S. Stout**	Edward V. Stoecklein
1955	R. William Patterson (D)	John C. Csipkar	Howard R. Malone	**Henry S. Stout**	Edward V. Stoecklein
1956	R. William Patterson (D)	Robert L. Schell	Howard R. Malone	**Henry S. Stout**	Edward V. Stoecklein (died 1 July 1956); Herbert K. Raney (rescinded); Earl D. Mueller (21 November 1956)
1957	R. William Patterson (D)	Robert L. Schell	Howard R. Malone	**Henry S. Stout**	Earl D. Mueller
1958	**R. William Patterson** (D)	Robert L. Schell	Howard R. Malone	Frank R. Somers	John Pottinger (died 5 December 1958)
1959	**R. William Patterson** (D)	Robert L. Schell	Howard R. Malone	Frank R. Somers	Roger R. Bussdicker (21 January 1959)
1960	**R. William Patterson** (D)	Robert L. Schell	Howard R. Malone	Frank R. Somers	Roger R. Bussdicker
1961	**R. William Patterson** (D)	Robert L. Schell	Howard R. Malone	Frank R. Somers	Roger R. Bussdicker
1962	David Forbes Pottinger (missing 1 August 1962); Dave Hall (R); 28 November 1962	Robert L. Schell	Howard R. Malone	**Frank R. Somers**	Don L. Crawford (D)
1963	Dave Hall (R)	Robert L. Schell	Howard R. Malone	**Frank R. Somers**	Don L. Crawford (D)
1964	Dave Hall (R)	Robert L. Schell	Roscoe L. Snyder	**Frank R. Somers**	Don L. Crawford (D)
1965	Dave Hall (R)	Robert L. Schell	Roscoe L. Snyder	**Frank R. Somers**	Don L. Crawford (D)
1966	**Dave Hall** (R)	Robert L. Schell	Roscoe L. Snyder	Joseph D. Wine	Don L. Crawford (D)
1967	**Dave Hall** (R)	Robert L. Schell	Roscoe L. Snyder	Joseph D. Wine	Don L. Crawford (D) (resigned 15 February 1967); James H. McGee (D)
1968	**Dave Hall** (R)	Mike M. Liskany	Roy R. Paulson	Joseph D. Wine (resigned 26 April 1968; Thomas B. Andrews (22 May 1968)	James H. McGee (D)
1969	**Dave Hall** (R)	Mike M. Liskany	Roy R. Paulson	Thomas B. Andrews	James H. McGee (D)

=== 1970 to present ===
As of November 1969, the mayor is elected separately from the other four commissioners.

Year	Mayor	1	2	3	4
1970	Dave Hall (R) (resigned 13 May 1970); James H. McGee (D) (15 July 1970)	Mike M. Liskany	Roy R. Paulson (resigned 6 May 1970); George E. Walter	Thomas B. Andrews	James H. McGee (D); Charles J. Curran (D) (23 September 1970)
1971	James H. McGee (D)	Mike M. Liskany (died 28 December 1971)	George E. Walter	Thomas B. Andrews	Charles J. Curran (D)
1972	James H. McGee (D)	John C. Smith	Paul B. Roderer	Thomas B. Andrews	Charles J. Curran (D)
1973	James H. McGee (D)	John C. Smith (-5/16/1973); Gail Levin (27 June 1973)	Paul B. Roderer	Thomas B. Andrews	Charles J. Curran (D)
1974	James H. McGee (D)	Gail Levin	Paul B. Roderer (- 20 November 1974)	Fred E. Weber (D)	Charles J. Curran (D)
1975	James H. McGee (D)	Gail Levin	Michael L. Schierloh (D) (22 January 1975)	Fred E. Weber (D)	Charles J. Curran (D)
1976	James H. McGee (D)	Patricia M. Roach (D)	Michael L. Schierloh (D)	Fred E. Weber (D)	Charles J. Curran (D)
1977	James H. McGee (D)	Patricia M. Roach (D)	Michael L. Schierloh (D)	Fred E. Weber (D)	Charles J. Curran (D)
1978	James H. McGee (D)	Patricia M. Roach (D)	Michael L. Schierloh (D)	Richard A. Zimmer	Charles J. Curran (D)
1979	James H. McGee (D)	Patricia M. Roach (D)	Michael L. Schierloh (D) (-5/4/1979); Abner J. Orick (R) (8 August 1979)	Richard A. Zimmer (D)	Charles J. Curran (D); Richard Clay Dixon (D) (4/1979)
1980	James H. McGee (D)	Patricia M. Roach (D)	Abner J. Orick (R)	Richard A. Zimmer (D)	Richard Clay Dixon (D)
1981	James H. McGee (D)	Patricia M. Roach (D)	Abner J. Orick (R)	Richard A. Zimmer (D)	Richard Clay Dixon (D)
1982	Paul R. Leonard (D)	Patricia M. Roach (D)	Abner J. Orick (R)	Richard A. Zimmer (D)	Richard Clay Dixon (D)
1983	Paul R. Leonard (D)	Patricia M. Roach (D)	Abner J. Orick (R)	Richard A. Zimmer (D)	Richard Clay Dixon (D)
1984	Paul R. Leonard (D)	Patricia M. Roach (D)	R. Mark Henry (D)	Richard A. Zimmer (D)	Richard Clay Dixon (D)
1985	Paul R. Leonard (D)	Patricia M. Roach (D) (-2/28/1985); Abner J. Orick (R) (22 May 1985)	R. Mark Henry (D)	Richard A. Zimmer (D)	Richard Clay Dixon (D)
1986	Paul R. Leonard (D)	Abner J. Orick (R)	R. Mark Henry (D)	Anthony Capizzi (D) (6 January 1986)	Richard Clay Dixon (D)
1987	Paul R. Leonard (D); Richard Clay Dixon (D) (appointed 9 January 1987)	Abner J. Orick (R)	R. Mark Henry (D)	Anthony Capizzi (D)	Richard Clay Dixon (D); Richard A. Zimmer (D) (8 April 1987)
1988	Richard Clay Dixon (D)	Abner J. Orick (R)	R. Mark Henry (D)	Anthony Capizzi (D)	Richard A. Zimmer (D)
1989	Richard Clay Dixon (D)	Abner J. Orick (R)	R. Mark Henry (D)	Anthony Capizzi (D)	Richard A. Zimmer (D)
1990	Richard Clay Dixon (D)	Abner J. Orick (R)	R. Mark Henry (D)	Anthony Capizzi (D)	Richard A. Zimmer (D)
1991	Richard Clay Dixon (D)	Abner J. Orick (R)	R. Mark Henry (D)	Anthony Capizzi (D)	Richard A. Zimmer (D)
1992	Richard Clay Dixon (D)	Idotha Bootsie Neal (D)	R. Mark Henry (D)	Anthony Capizzi (D)	Richard A. Zimmer (D)
1993	Richard Clay Dixon (D)	Idotha Bootsie Neal (D)	R. Mark Henry (D) (resigned 17 September 1993); Dean A. Lovelace (D) (17 November 1993)	Anthony Capizzi (D)	Richard A. Zimmer (D)
1994	Michael R. Turner (R)	Idotha Bootsie Neal (D)	Dean A. Lovelace (D)	Anthony Capizzi (D)	Richard A. Zimmer (D)
1995	Michael R. Turner (R)	Idotha Bootsie Neal (D)	Dean A. Lovelace (D)	Anthony Capizzi (D)	Richard A. Zimmer (D)
1996	Michael R. Turner (R)	Idotha Bootsie Neal (D)	Dean A. Lovelace (D)	Anthony Capizzi (D)	Richard A. Zimmer (D) (resigned 3 June 1996)
1997	Michael R. Turner (R)	Idotha Bootsie Neal (D)	Dean A. Lovelace (D)	Anthony Capizzi (D)	Abner J. Orick (R)
1998	Michael R. Turner (R)	Idotha Bootsie Neal (D)	Dean A. Lovelace (D)	Mary L. Wiseman (D)	Lloyd E. Lewis Jr. (D)
1999	Michael R. Turner (R)	Idotha Bootsie Neal (D)	Dean A. Lovelace (D)	Mary L. Wiseman (D)	Lloyd E. Lewis Jr. (D)
2000	Michael R. Turner (R)	Idotha Bootsie Neal (D)	Dean A. Lovelace (D)	Mary L. Wiseman (D)	Lloyd E. Lewis Jr. (D)
2001	Michael R. Turner (R)	Idotha Bootsie Neal (D)	Dean A. Lovelace (D)	Mary L. Wiseman (D)	Lloyd E. Lewis Jr. (D) (died 4 March 2001); Edythe Lewis (D)
2002	Rhine L. McLin (D)	Idotha Bootsie Neal (D)	Dean A. Lovelace (D)	Joey D. Williams (D)	Richard A. Zimmer (D)
2003	Rhine L. McLin (D)	Idotha Bootsie Neal (D)	Dean A. Lovelace (D)	Joey D. Williams (D)	Richard A. Zimmer (D)
2004	Rhine L. McLin (D)	Matt Joseph (D)	Dean A. Lovelace (D)	Joey D. Williams (D)	Richard A. Zimmer (D)
2005	Rhine McLin (D)	Matt Joseph (D)	Dean A. Lovelace (D)	Joey D. Williams (D)	Richard A. Zimmer (D)
2006	Rhine McLin (D)	Matt Joseph (D)	Dean A. Lovelace (D)	Joey D. Williams (D)	Nan Whaley (D)
2010	Gary Leitzell (I)	Matt Joseph (D)	Dean A. Lovelace (D)	Joey D. Williams (D)	Nan Whaley (D)
2014	Nan Whaley (D)	Matt Joseph (D)	Dean A. Lovelace (D)	Joey D. Williams (D)	Jeffrey J. Mims Jr. (D)
2018	Nan Whaley (D)	Matt Joseph (D)	Christopher Shaw (D)	Darryl Fairchild (D)	Jeffrey J. Mims Jr. (D)
2022	Jeff Mims
2026	Shenise Turner-Sloss

== Election results ==
Bold type indicates winner.

=== General election ===
**Year**	**Democrat**			**Republican**			**Other**			Notes
1989	**Richard Clay Dixon**			Abner J. Orick						
1993	Richard Clay Dixon	21,989	49.6%	**Michael R. Turner**	**22,386**	**50.4%**				
1997	Anthony Capizzi	17,138	46.5%	**Michael R. Turner**	**19,755**	**53.5%**				
2001	**Rhine McLin**	**18,850**	**51.6%**	Michael R. Turner	17,676	48.4%				
2005	**Rhine McLin**	**17,929**	**55.4%**				David R. Bohardt*	14,423	44.6%	*Registered Democrat, running as an independent.
2009	Rhine McLin	14,045	48.5%				**Gary Leitzell***	**14,923**	**51.5%**	*No party registration, Republican vote of support

=== Primary election ===
The two candidates who run in the general election are chosen in this primary election. When fewer than three candidates file, no primary election is held.

Year	Winning candidates	Losing candidates
1993	Richard Clay Dixon (D): 11,036; Michael R. Turner (R): 9,696	James L. Sweeney: 4,865; David Esrati: 1,038; Gary M. Kidd, Jr.: 900; Emerson L. Glaser: 346
1997	(no primary election)	(no primary election)
2001	(no primary election)	(no primary election)
2005	Rhine McLin (D): 7,167; David R. Bohardt (D): 5,439	Barbara L. Temple: 1,859

== Municipal Court Clerk ==
The clerk of the Dayton, Ohio, Municipal Court is elected for a four-year term.

Year	Candidates
2003	Mark E. Owens (D): 15,278
