= Bootsie =

Bootsie or Bootsy may refer to:

- Bootsie Barnes, tenor saxophonist from Philadelphia, PA
- Bootsie and Snudge, a UK television sitcom series from the 1960s
- Bootsie, the name of the character "Roadrunner" (Hungarian: Gyalogkakkuk) in the English subtitles of the film Kontroll
- Bootsie Neal, former politician in Dayton, Ohio
- Bootsie (later "Brutus"), the original name of Polly's cat in "The Cat Who..." series
- Bootsie Snootie, a character from the show "PB&J Otter", and Ootsie’s twin sister.
- Bootsy Collins (born 1951), funk bassist, singer, and songwriter
- Bootsy Thornton, an American former baseball player
- Caligula, third Emperor of Rome, who was given the name in his youth, which translates roughly to “Bootsie” or “Little Boots”.
