= Sam Hall (diver) =

American diver (1937–2014)

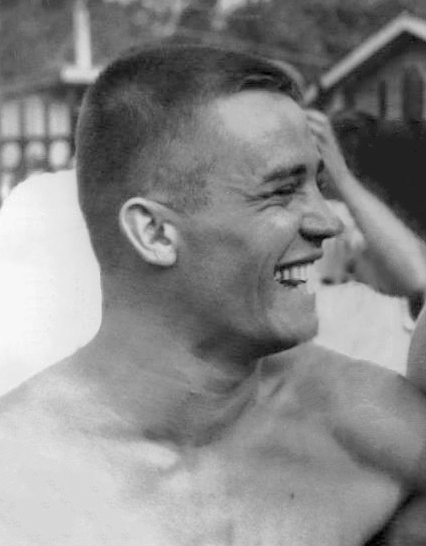
- Hall in 1960

Personal information
- Born: March 10, 1937 Dayton, Ohio, U.S.
- Died: August 11, 2014 (aged 77) Florida, U.S.
- Height: 175 cm (5 ft 9 in)
- Weight: 70 kg (154 lb)

Sport
- Sport: Diving
- Club: WBNS Swim Club
Medal record
Representing the United States
Olympic Games
Silver medal – second place	1960 Rome	Springboard
Pan American Games
Silver medal – second place	1959 Chicago	Springboard
Representing Ohio State
NCAA
Gold medal – first place	1959 Ithaca	3 meter diving
Gold medal – first place	1960 University Park	1 meter diving
Gold medal – first place	1960 University Park	3 meter diving

Samuel "Sam" Wesley Hall (March 10, 1937 – August 11, 2014) was an American Olympic silver medalist diver and politician who served as a member of the Ohio House of Representatives.

== Early life and education ==
He was born in Dayton, Ohio, where his father Dave was mayor. His brother, Tony P. Hall, was a politician and diplomat.

Hall began his athletic career began at Fairmont High School, where he was a two-time letterwinner in track and field. During high school, Hall set records for pole vaulting.

=== College ===
In the fall of 1955, Hall enrolled at the Ohio State University, where he lettered in gymnastics, soccer, track and diving. As a trackman, Hall competed in the pole vault and javelin. During 1959–1960, Hall won two Big-Ten Conference championships, three NCAA championships, and three U.S. Amateur Athletic Union titles.

== Career ==
=== 1960 Olympics ===
Hall won a silver medal at the 1959 Pan American Games and 1960 Summer Olympics. After the 1960 Olympics, Hall served with the United States Air Force and competed in athletics for them, eventually retiring due to a knee injury.

=== Politics ===
From 1964 to 1966, Hall served as a member of the Ohio House of Representatives.

=== Pro-Contra efforts ===
Hall later worked as an unpaid "volunteer counterterrorist," as Hall described himself, going to Central America to fight on the side of anti-communist forces as an advisor to the Nicaraguan Contras. He reentered the national spotlight again in late 1986 when he was captured by Sandinista National Liberation Front forces, which announced the capture of a "spy". Hall was freed after less than two months.

When interviewed by journalists regarding his "volunteer counterrorist" activity, Hall sometimes referred to himself by saying, "They call me the Evel Knievel of Dayton" or "Just call me Sammy of the Sinai."

== Personal life ==
Prior to his death, Hall worked as a real estate agent. Hall died in Florida on August 11, 2014, aged 77.
