= 2005 Dayton mayoral election =

- November 8, 2005
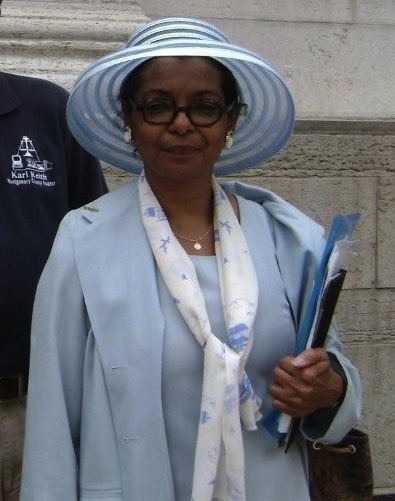

Candidate	Rhine McLin	David Bohardt
Party	Nonpartisan	Nonpartisan
Popular vote	18,258	14,721
Percentage	55.36%	44.64%
Mayor before election
Rhine McLin
Nonpartisan
Elected mayor
Rhine McLin
Nonpartisan

The 2005 Dayton mayoral election took place on November 8, 2005. Incumbent Mayor Rhine McLin ran for re-election to a second term. She was challenged by homebuilder David Bohardt and former police major Barbara Temple. McLin argued that, while the city's revenues had fallen in worse economic times, she made progress on housing and economic development, while her opponents argued that she had mismanaged the city. In the primary election, McLin placed first by a wide margin, winning just shy of 50 percent of the vote. Bohardt placed second with 38 percent of the vote, beating out Temple, who placed third with 13 percent.

In the general election, McLin was endorsed for re-election by the Dayton Daily News. The Daily News praised her for having "good instincts" and noted that, while Bohardt was "a serious candidate who is committed to Dayton," the "region's leadership would be poorer without having Mayor McLin's voice."

McLin ultimately defeated Bohardt by a wide margin, winning re-election with 55 percent of the vote.

== Primary election ==
=== Candidates ===
- Rhine McLin, incumbent Mayor
- David Bohardt, historic architecture preservationist, executive director of the Home Builders Association of Dayton and the Miami Valley
- Barbara Temple, former Dayton Police Department major, former interim director of the Miami County emergency dispatch center

=== Results ===
Primary election results
Party	Candidate	Votes	%
Nonpartisan	Rhine McLin (inc.)	7,167	49.55%
Nonpartisan	David Bohardt	5,439	37.60%
Nonpartisan	Barbara Temple	1,859	12.85%
Total votes		14,465	100.00%

== General election ==
=== Results ===
2005 Dayton mayoral election results
Party	Candidate	Votes	%
Nonpartisan	Rhine McLin (inc.)	18,258	55.36%
Nonpartisan	David Bohardt	14,721	44.64%
Total votes		32,979	100.00%
