= Mac McLin =

American politician (1899–1966)

President of the Dayton NAACP
- In office January 1, 1937 – April 27, 1938
- Preceded by: Rev. J.N. Samuels-Bolboder
- Succeeded by: Viola T. Lewis-Waiters

Personal details
- Born: Clarence Josef McLin; August 20, 1899 Tennessee, U.S.
- Died: December 20, 1966 (aged 67) Dayton, Ohio, U.S.
- Children: C. J. McLin Jr.
- Relatives: Rhine McLin (grand-daughter); Candace Smith (grand-daughter)

Clarence Josef McLin Sr. (August 20, 1899 – December 20, 1966) was an American civic leader and businessman in Dayton, Ohio.

== Early life ==
McLin was born in Tennessee and also lived in Chicago.

== Career ==
McLin founded the McLin Funeral Home in 1932. He served as the eighth president of the Dayton Branch of the NAACP from 1937 to 1938. McLin also founded the Democratic Voters League and ran unsuccessfully for the Dayton City Commission.

== Personal life ==
He and his wife Rubie were married on April 28, 1920. They moved to Dayton, Ohio around 1931. McLin's son, C. J. McLin, served as a Democratic member of the Ohio House of Representatives.

His granddaughter, Rhine McLin, served as a minority leader of the Ohio Senate and was the mayor of Dayton from 2002 to 2010.
