= Senator Seeley =

Senator Seeley may refer to:

- Ebenezer Seeley (1793–1866), Connecticut State Senate
- John Seeley (Steuben County, NY) (1872–1932), New York State Senate

== See also ==
- Morris Seely (1795–1847), Ohio State Senate
- Gilbert T. Seelye (1877–1962), New York State Senate
