= Myrl Shoemaker =

American politician

- Shoemaker in 1981

57th Lieutenant Governor of Ohio
- In office January 10, 1983 – July 30, 1985
- Governor: Dick Celeste
- Preceded by: George Voinovich
- Succeeded by: Paul R. Leonard

Member of the Ohio House of Representatives from the 88th district
- In office January 3, 1967-December 31, 1982
- Preceded by: Districts Established
- Succeeded by: Mike Shoemaker

Personal details
- Born: April 14, 1913 Chillicothe, Ohio, U.S.
- Died: July 30, 1985 (aged 72) Bourneville, Ohio, U.S.
- Party: Democratic

Myrl Howard Shoemaker (April 14, 1913 – July 30, 1985) was an American politician of the Democratic party who served as the 57th lieutenant governor of Ohio from 1983 until his death in 1985.

== Career ==
Shoemaker served for 24 years in the Ohio House of Representatives before being elected lieutenant governor in 1982 as running mate of Dick Celeste. Celeste's choice of Shoemaker for Lieutenant Governor was pivotal for him to receive downstate support in the election to offset the political support of his opponent, U.S. Rep. Clarence J. "Bud" Brown Jr. Wags claimed that if elected, Celeste would be the Governor above Interstate 70 and Shoemaker would be the Governor below Interstate 70, the highway that bisects Ohio.

During his term as lieutenant governor, Shoemaker also served as director of the Ohio Department of Natural Resources. Shoemaker was the first lieutenant governor in the United States to serve simultaneously in a governor's cabinet as the head of a state department. He stepped down from the cabinet post on July 1, 1985, due to health problems.

== Death and legacy ==
Shoemaker died of cancer in 1985 while serving as lieutenant governor. He had been confined to his home in Bourneville for several months.

His son Mike Shoemaker succeeded him in the state house, and went on to serve in the Ohio State Senate

The Convocation center on the campus of the University of Cincinnati bears his name. The main arena has been sponsored by Fifth Third Bank since 2005, and is legally named "Fifth Third Arena at Shoemaker Center".

== Gallery ==
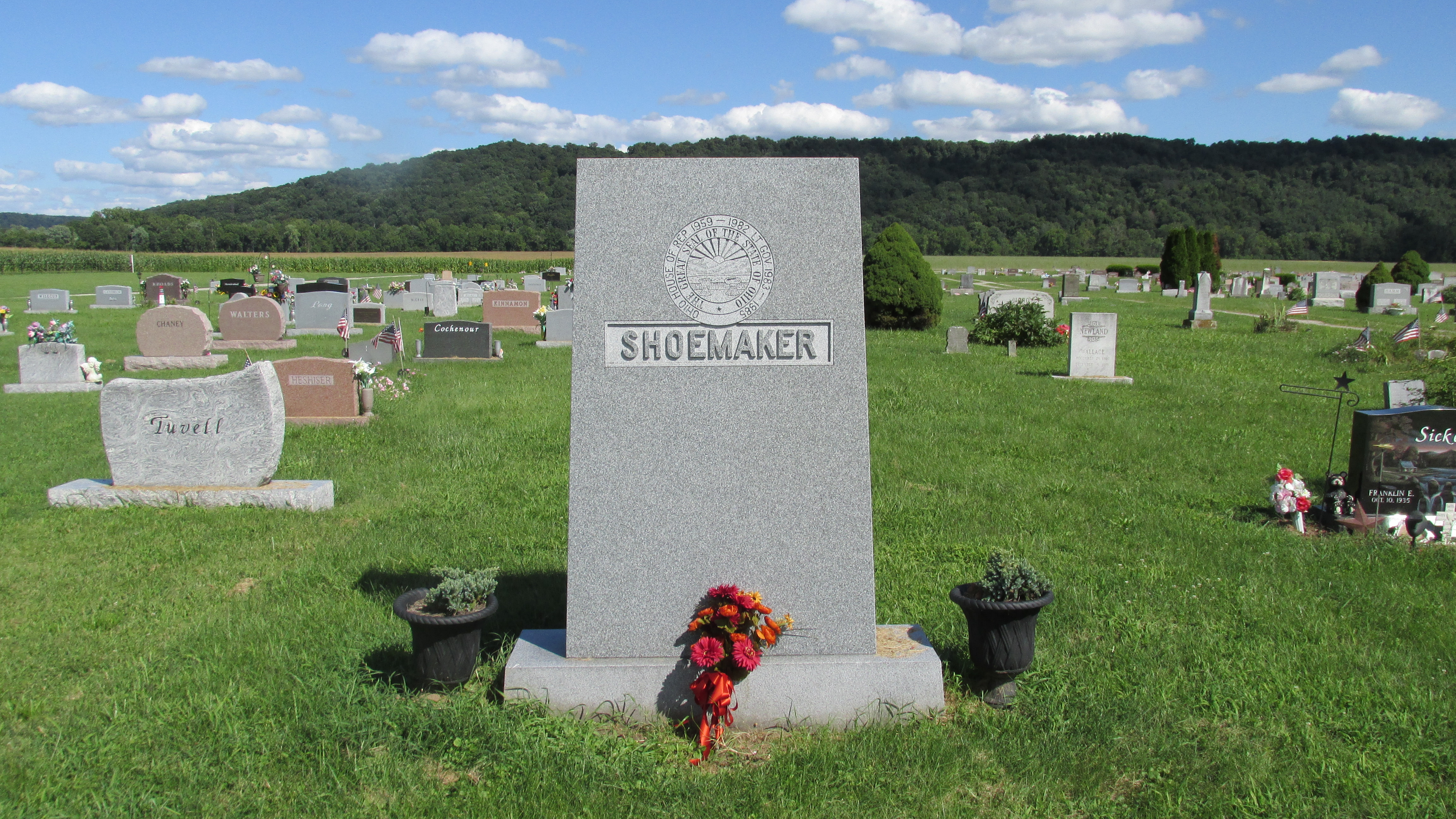
Headstone of Myrl Shoemaker located in Twin Township Cemetery in Bourneville, Ohio.

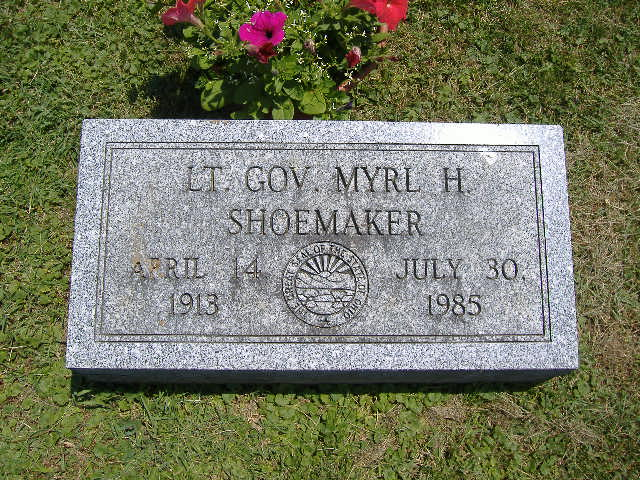
Grave marker of Myrl Shoemaker.

Party political offices
Preceded by Michael Dorrian	Democratic nominee for Lieutenant Governor of Ohio; 1982	Succeeded by Paul Leonard
Political offices
Preceded by George Voinovich	Lieutenant Governor of Ohio; 1983–1985	Succeeded by Paul R. Leonard
