= Paul Leonard (politician) =

American politician (born 1943)

Paul R. Leonard

58th Lieutenant Governor of Ohio
- In office January 12, 1987 – January 14, 1991
- Governor: Dick Celeste
- Preceded by: Myrl Shoemaker
- Succeeded by: Mike DeWine

Mayor of Dayton
- In office 1982–1986
- Preceded by: James H. McGee
- Succeeded by: Richard Clay Dixon

Member of the Ohio House of Representatives from the 37th district
- In office January 3, 1973 – December 31, 1980
- Preceded by: Tony P. Hall
- Succeeded by: Larry Balweg

Personal details
- Born: July 3, 1943 (age 83) Dayton, Ohio, U.S.
- Party: Democratic

Paul R. Leonard (born July 3, 1943) is an American politician who is a member of the Ohio Democratic Party. He served as the mayor of Dayton from 1982 to 1986 and as the 58th lieutenant governor of Ohio from 1987 to 1991.

== Education ==
Leonard graduated from Ohio University with a B.A. in journalism in 1965 and received his J.D. from Northern Kentucky University in 1969.

== Political career ==
Leonard was elected four times to seats in the Ohio General Assembly. After his time in the Ohio General Assembly he then served as mayor of Dayton, Ohio, from 1982 to 1986. After finishing his term as mayor he was elected Lieutenant Governor of Ohio in 1986 on the ticket with Richard F. Celeste. He served as the lieutenant governor from 1987 to 1991.

While mayor of Dayton, Leonard was known as outgoing and youth-oriented, sometimes called "the Rock 'N' Roll Mayor of Dayton." He played the electric guitar and appeared in television commercials.

After his tenure as lieutenant governor, Leonard returned to Dayton to practice law. He founded the Center for Animal Law and Advocacy, a legal team that advocates for harsher penalties for those who mistreat animals.

In addition to his law practice, Leonard currently teaches in the political science departments at both Wright State University and the University of Dayton. He is also on the Board of Directors for the Animal Legal Defense Fund. He currently lives in Florida, but commutes to Dayton to teach his classes.

Party political offices
Preceded by Myrl Shoemaker	Democratic nominee for Lieutenant Governor of Ohio; 1986	Succeeded by Eugene Branstool
Political offices
Preceded by Myrl Shoemaker	Lieutenant Governor of Ohio; January 12, 1987 – January 14, 1991	Succeeded by Mike DeWine
Preceded by James McGee	Mayor of Dayton, Ohio; 1982–1986	Succeeded by Richard Clay Dixon
