= R. William Patterson =

American politician and attorney

R. William Patterson (July 28, 1908 – June 18, 1995), a U.S. politician and member of the Democratic party, was mayor of Dayton, Ohio, from 1958 to 1961.

An attorney, Patterson ran against Republican incumbent Paul F. Schenck in the 1960 United States House of Representatives elections but was defeated by nearly 65,000 votes. In the 1970s, he was part of a committee for making changes to Dayton's city charter, and Patterson has been credited with leading the push to bring Interstate 75 through Dayton.

Patterson married Virginia Karns and they had three children: Ann, James, and Ryan. He is buried with his wife at Calvary Cemetery in Dayton.

== See also ==
- Ohio's 3rd congressional district
- Politics of Dayton, Ohio

Government offices
Preceded by Henry S. Stout	Mayor of Dayton, Ohio; 1958–1961	Succeeded by Frank R. Somers
