= Dixie Allen =

American politician (1935–2019)

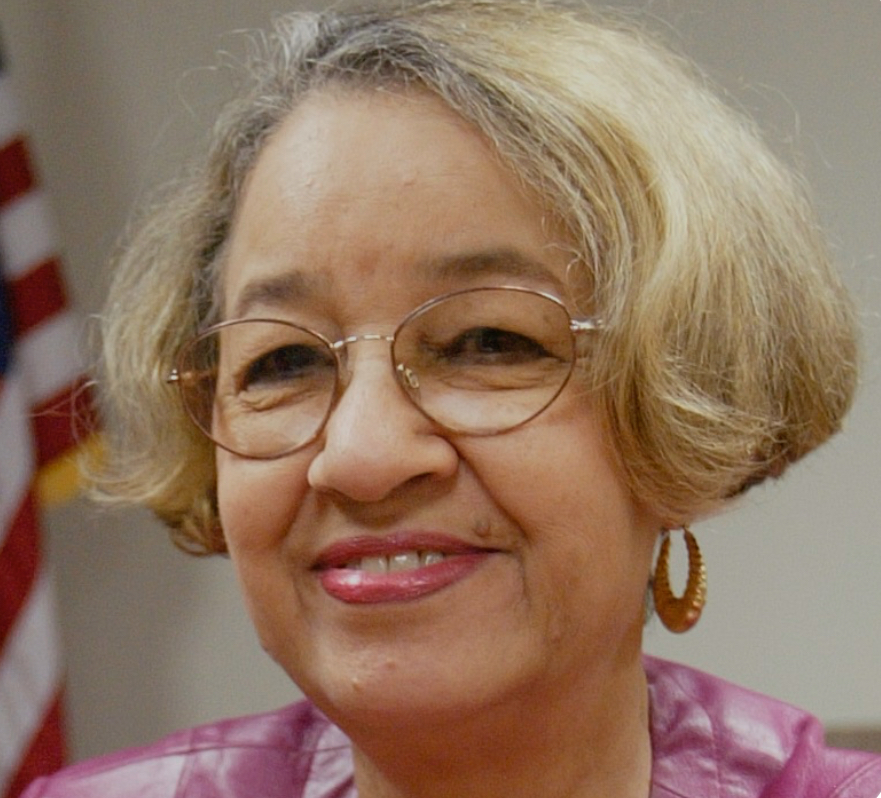

Member of the Ohio House of Representatives from the 39th district
- In office January 6, 1998 – July 27, 2006
- Preceded by: Lloyd Lewis Jr.
- Succeeded by: Clayton Luckie

Personal details
- Born: Dixie Jean Woods; January 27, 1935 Dayton, Ohio, U.S.
- Died: April 1, 2019 (aged 84) Dayton, Ohio, U.S.
- Party: Democratic
- Spouse: Jimmy H. Allen

Dixie Jean Allen (née Woods; January 27, 1935 – April 1, 2019) was a politician from Dayton, Ohio, who served in the Ohio House of Representatives and on the Montgomery County Commission. After the resignation of Rep. Lloyd Lewis Jr. in 1998, Allen was chosen as a political newcomer to replace him. She went on to win a full term in 1998, and was reelected in 2000. In 2001, she opted for an appointment to the Ohio Senate, however did not obtain it. Instead she, won reelection for a third full House term in 2002, and again in 2004.

In 2006, Republicans convinced Allen that if she would switch political parties, they would appoint her as a county commissioner. She did so, and was appointed on July 25, 2006, after resignation from the House. In the 2006 general election, however, Allen was defeated for a full term by Democrat Judy Dodge, and has since moved back to the Democratic Party. Allen died on April 1, 2019.
