= Don L. Crawford =

American politician

Don L. Crawford was an American politician of the Democratic party, who was the first African-American person to serve as a city commissioner of Dayton, Ohio. He served on the commission from 1962 to 1967. While presenting a key to the city to Martin Luther King Jr. in 1964, Crawford remarked that the key would not actually open many parts of the city to him, angering the other city commissioners.

Wright State University, which holds his papers, called him, "one of Dayton's best-known African American leaders of the 1960s-1980s." A park and Don Crawford Plaza are named after him.
