= Dave Hall (Dayton mayor) =

American politician

Mayor of Dayton, Ohio
- In office January 2, 1966 – May 13, 1970
- Preceded by: Frank Somers
- Succeeded by: James H. McGee

Personal details
- Born: Paul Davis Hall; July 13, 1906 Miamisburg, Ohio, U.S.
- Died: August 22, 1977 (aged 71) Dayton, Ohio, U.S.
- Party: Republican
- Children: 3, including Sam and Tony

Dave Hall (July 13, 1906 – August 22, 1977) was an American politician and businessman who served as the mayor of Dayton, Ohio, from 1966 to 1970.

== Early life ==
Hall was born on July 13, 1906, in Miamisburg, Ohio.

== Career ==
He worked in real estate development and owned a laundry business that he sold in 1953.

In 1962, he was appointed to the Dayton City Commission. He ran for mayor in 1965, defeating Don Crawford, a fellow commissioner. After his victory, he told talk show host Phil Donahue that being mayor would be “the greatest thing since Ex-Lax”. During his term, he had to face race riots in 1966, after the shooting of a black man by whites.

He won re-election in 1969 but did not serve out his second term. Hall resigned as mayor in May 1970 because of health problems. He was succeeded by City Commissioner James McGee, who became Dayton's first African American mayor.

Dave Hall Plaza, dedicated in 1971 and named after Hall, surrounds the Crowne Plaza Hotel at Fifth and Main streets in Dayton.

== Personal life ==
Hall's wife was named Ann. They had three sons, Sam, Mike, and Tony. Mike was a principal at a Cincinnati-area high school. Tony P. Hall, was a Democratic U.S. representative for 24 years and subsequently U.S. Ambassador to the United Nations Agencies for Food and Agriculture. He was nominated for the Nobel Peace Prize three times. Sam Hall was silver medalist in diving at the 1960 Summer Olympics.

Hall died of a heart attack on August 22, 1977, at the age of 71.

Political offices
Preceded by Frank R. Somers	Mayor of Dayton, Ohio; 1966–1970	Succeeded by James McGee
