= James H. McGee =

American politician (1918–2006)

James Howell McGee

Mayor of Dayton, Ohio
- In office July 15, 1970 – January 2, 1982
- Preceded by: Dave Hall
- Succeeded by: Paul Leonard

President of the Dayton NAACP
- In office January 1, 1958 – December 31, 1959
- Preceded by: Charles J. Francis, Sr.
- Succeeded by: Dr. Maceo R. Clarke, Sr.

Personal details
- Born: November 8, 1918 Berryburg, West Virginia, U.S.
- Died: March 4, 2006 (aged 87) Trotwood, Ohio, U.S.

James Howell McGee (November 8, 1918 – March 4, 2006) was an American politician of the Ohio Democratic party. He served as the first black mayor of Dayton, Ohio and was the city’s longest-tenured mayor to date.

== Biography ==
McGee was born in Berryberg, West Virginia, and was raised in Steubenville, Ohio. He graduated from Wilberforce University in 1937. After serving in the United States Army, he received a law degree from Ohio State University in 1948.

He moved to Dayton to practice law and worked with the NAACP in civil rights cases. He filed one of the first segregation cases after the landmark Brown v. Board of Education decision. In 1959, he became the 23rd president of the Dayton Branch of the National Association for the Advancement of Colored People NAACP.

McGee entered politics as an assistant to Rep. Rodney M. Love of Ohio working on the War on Poverty. in 1967, Dayton City Commissioner Don Crawford resigned to become the Dayton City Clerk and McGee was selected to fill his term. McGee won re-election to the seat in 1969.

In May 1970, Mayor Dave Hall resigned for health reasons. The City Commission deadlocked for two months with tie votes of 2-2 with McGee and Michael Liskany each receiving the vote of another commissioner. Liskany ultimately announced that he would drop out, allowing McGee to become mayor.

McGee was re-elected in 1973 and 1977 before stepping down. After leaving politics, he continued with his legal practice.

== Personal life ==
He met his wife, Elizabeth while he was in law school. They had two children.

McGee was a Prince Hall Freemason, holding membership in Ancient Square Lodge No. 40 of Dayton, Ohio, and was also a member of Alpha Phi Alpha fraternity.

McGee died on March 4, 2006, in Trotwood, Ohio.

== Legacy ==
In 1988, a major boulevard in Dayton was named for McGee. Formerly known as Western Avenue, in West Dayton, the road is now known as James H. McGee Boulevard from Germantown Street to Little Richmond Road.

== See also ==
- List of first African-American mayors

Preceded by Dave Hall	Mayor of Dayton, Ohio; 1970-1981	Succeeded by Paul Leonard
