= Chuck Curran =

American politician

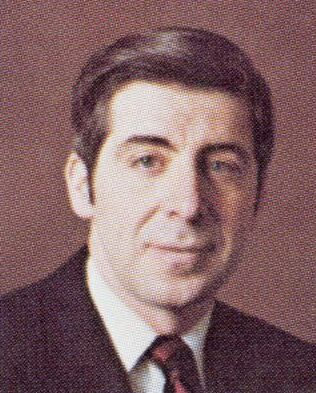

Member of the Ohio Senate from the 6th district
- In office January 9, 1979 – December 13, 1982
- Preceded by: Tony P. Hall
- Succeeded by: Tom Fries

Personal details
- Born: June 1, 1939 (age 87) Galion, Ohio
- Party: Democrat (1970–1996); Republican (1996–present)
- Spouse: Mara Ann Wahl
- Children: 3
- Education: Bellefontaine High School; Eastern Illinois University
- Profession: Senator, County Commissioner, City Commissioner, Teacher, Professor, Reference Librarian

Charles J. Curran (born June 1, 1939, in Galion, Ohio) is an American politician.

He was born in 1939 in Galion, Ohio, the son of a railroad construction worker. He graduated from Bellefontaine High School in Bellefontaine, Ohio in 1958. After high school, Curran ended up in Charleston, Illinois where he earned a bachelor's degree in government and library science from Eastern Illinois University in 1963. He completed some graduate work at Miami University and the University of Dayton.

Curran relocated to Dayton, Ohio in 1963 to handle government documents for the Dayton Public Library. He then worked as a Social Sciences teacher at Fairborn High School from 1963 to 1965, and he worked as a Reference Librarian at Belmont High School from 1965 to 1966. In 1966, Curran was hired as a Political Science instructor at Sinclair Community College in Dayton.

He served as a Democrat on the city commission of Dayton, from 1970 to 1979. He later served as the Democratic Ohio State Senator for the 6th district from 1979 to 1983. In 1983, Charles began his first of 6 four-year terms as Montgomery County Commissioner (served 1983–2006). In 1996, Curran switched to the Republican Party. In November 2006, he was defeated by Democratic candidate, Dan Foley. He continues to serve as associate professor of political science at Sinclair Community College.

On June 15, 1963, Curran married Mara Ann Wahl (born October 19, 1941); the couple has three children.
