= Clay Dixon =

American politician

Richard Clay Dixon
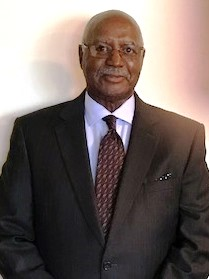
- Dixon in 2017

52nd Mayor of Dayton, Ohio
- In office January 9, 1987 – January 4, 1994
- Preceded by: Paul Leonard
- Succeeded by: Mike Turner

Personal details
- Born: Richard Clay Dixon; October 24, 1941 (age 84) Dayton, Ohio, U.S.
- Party: Democratic
- Spouse: Judy Dixon
- Children: 2
- Parents: Rubin Dixon; Frances Dixon
- Education: Central State University (BA) Xavier University (MBA)

Richard Clay Dixon (born October 24, 1941) is an American politician of the Ohio Democratic party. He served as a city commissioner of Dayton, Ohio, and as the city's mayor. He was the second African-American person to serve as mayor of Dayton.

== Education ==
Dixon graduated from Central State University in 1963, and was inducted into the Central State University Alumni Achievement Hall of Fame in 2006.

== Mayor of Dayton ==
On January 9, 1987, Dayton City Commissioner Richard Clay Dixon was sworn in as the Mayor of the City of Dayton by Dr. Sarah Harris. He was unanimously appointed by his peers to succeed Mayor Paul Leonard, who was elected as Lieutenant Governor for the State of Ohio.

== Personal life ==
Dixon is married to Judy Dixon. Together, they have two children and one grandchild.
