= Mary Wiseman (judge) =

American lawyer and judge (born 1961)

Mary L. Wiseman

Judge of the Montgomery County Court of Common Pleas
- Incumbent
- Assumed office 2007
- Appointed by: Ted Strickland
- Preceded by: John Kessler

Personal details
- Born: Mary Lynn Wiseman; November 17, 1961 (age 64) Chillicothe, Ohio, U.S.
- Education: Ball State University (BS); University of Arkansas at Little Rock (JD)

Mary L. Wiseman (born November 17, 1961) is an American lawyer and judge from Ohio. On October 22, 2007, Ohio Governor Ted Strickland appointed her to the Ohio Courts of Common Pleas for Montgomery County.

== Early life and education ==
Wiseman was born in Chillicothe, Ohio and spent most of her childhood in Greenfield, Indiana. She received her bachelor's degree from Ball State University in 1984 and a Juris Doctor from the University of Arkansas at Little Rock School of Law in 1988.

== Career ==
In 1991, Wiseman became a partner at the law firm of Faruki Ireland and Cox P.L.L. A Democrat, Wiseman was elected in 1998 to the Dayton City Commission, serving until 2002 when she declined to run for a second term. A lesbian, she was the first openly gay person elected to public office in Dayton. In 2005, she became a shareholder at Coolidge Wall Co. LPA.

=== Ohio Court of Common Pleas ===
Upon her 2007 appointment to the bench, Wiseman became the first openly gay judge in the history of the state of Ohio.

During her first year as a judge, Wiseman presided over the high-profile trial of China P. Arnold, a mother found guilty of burning her month-old baby to death in a microwave oven. Wiseman sentenced Arnold to life in prison without the possibility of parole.

Wiseman sought election to the post in 2008. She looked set to face a challenge in the Democratic primary from District Court judge James D. Piergies, but he withdrew in January 2008 following a controversy over allegedly homophobic comments he had made during the campaign. She faced Margaret M. Quinn, a Republican but ended up winning by 53% to 47%.

Wiseman is admitted to the bar in Ohio, Arkansas, the United States District Court for the Southern District of Ohio, the United States District Court for the Northern District of Ohio, and the United States Court of Appeals for the Fourth Circuit, Sixth Circuit, Seventh Circuit, Eighth Circuit and Ninth Circuit, as well as the Supreme Court of the United States. She is a member of the Ohio State Bar Association and the American Bar Association.

=== Consideration for federal judicial nomination ===
In 2009, Wiseman was shortlisted for a vacancy on the U.S. District Court for the Southern District of Ohio. Ohio's two U.S. Senators – Sherrod Brown (D–Lorain) and George Voinovich (R–Cleveland) – convened a bipartisan commission to recommend candidates for the vacancy, with Wiseman emerging as one of three finalists. In July 2009, Brown and Voinovich recommended U.S. Magistrate Judge Timothy Black to Barack Obama for appointment to the seat.

== See also ==
- List of first women lawyers and judges in Ohio
- List of LGBT jurists in the United States
