= Edythe Lewis =

American disc jockey (1924–2014)

Edythe M. Lewis
- Born: February 26, 1924; New York, US
- Died: June 5, 2014 (aged 90)
- Education: University of Cincinnati; Wright State University; Central Michigan University
- Occupations: Radio host, politician
- Spouse: Lloyd E. Lewis Jr.

Edythe M. "Delilah" Lewis (February 26, 1924 – June 5, 2014) was an American woman who was the first black, female disc jockey in Dayton, Ohio, United States, in the 1950s.

== Early life and education ==
Lewis was born Edythe Mulzac, raised in Harlem and trained as a nurse at Harlem Hospital in New York. Later, she earned her bachelor's degree in Education from the University of Cincinnati and then two master's degrees.

== Career ==
Lewis was the first black woman to host a radio show in Dayton, Ohio, broadcasting on WING-AM as Delilah in the 1950s. She was inducted into the Dayton Area Broadcasters Hall of Fame in 2003. The Dayton Daily News called her a pioneer and said she was a role model during a period when there were very few black people in the broadcasting industry.

In 1971, she was hired by the Miami Conservancy District. She later became the District's executive director. In 1976, Governor James A. Rhodes appointed her to the Ohio Recreation and Resources Commission. In 1979 she was named one of Dayton's Top 10 Women by the Dayton Daily News. Lewis retired from the District in the early 1980s.

She served on the boards of Wright State University and the Children's Medical Center, among others.

In 2001, her husband Lloyd E. Lewis Jr., a member of the Dayton City Commission, died, and she was elected in a special election to fill out the remaining months of his term, defeating Republican Abner Orick.

== Personal life ==
Lewis died on June 5, 2014, from complications from Alzheimer's disease.

== Recognition ==
- 1979: Top 10 Women
- 2003: Dayton Broadcasting Hall of Fame
