= Shenise Turner-Sloss =

Mayor of Dayton, Ohio since 2026

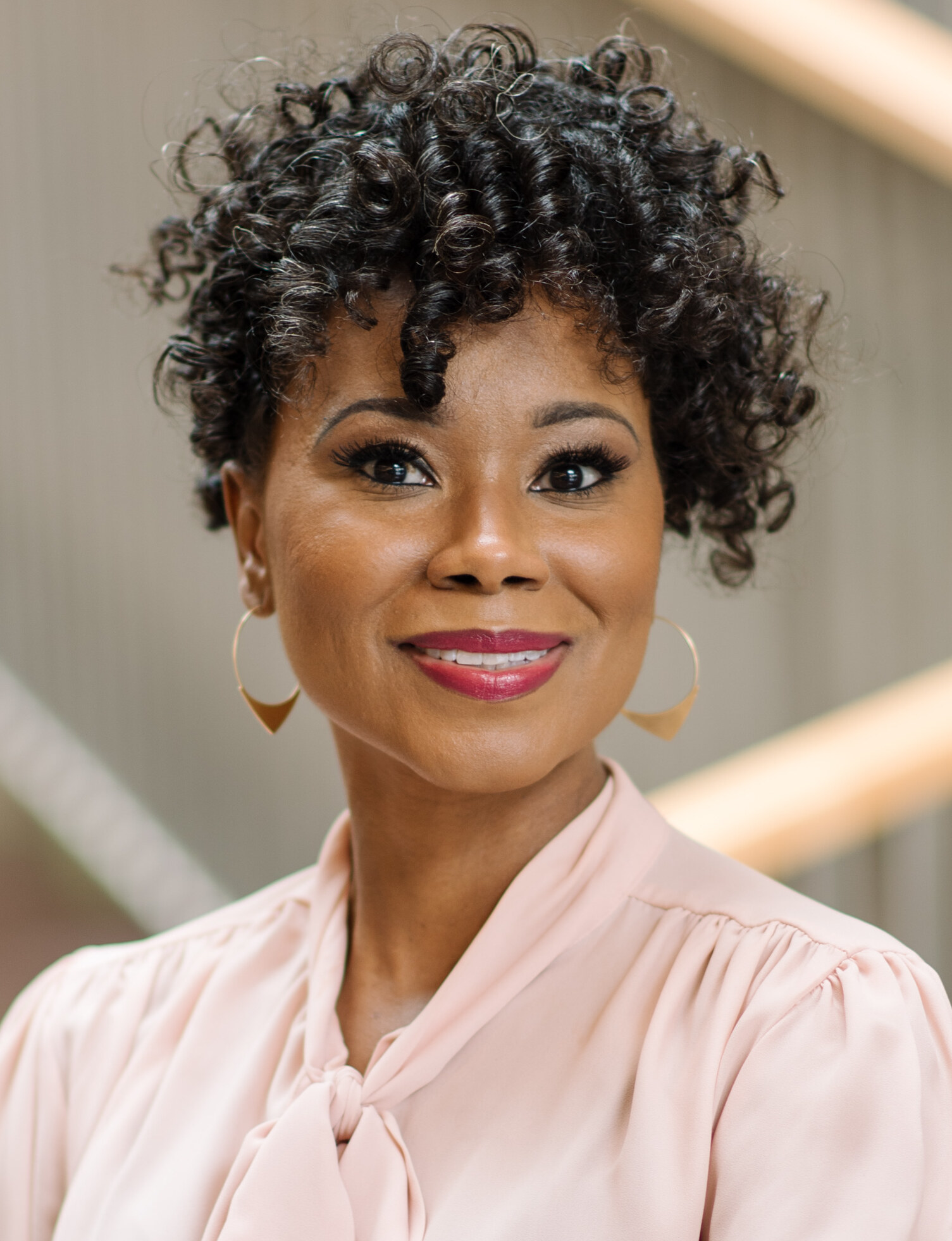
- Turner-Sloss in 2021

58th Mayor of Dayton
- Incumbent
- Assumed office January 5, 2026
- Preceded by: Jeff Mims

Dayton City Commissioner
- In office January 2022 – January 5, 2026

Personal details
- Born: November 20, 1981 (age 44) Dayton, Ohio, U.S.
- Party: Democratic
- Education: Fisk University (BA); Central Michigan University (MS)

Shenise Turner-Sloss (born November 20, 1981) is an American politician who has served as the mayor of Dayton, Ohio since 2026. She previously served on the Dayton City Commission from 2022 to 2026. Turner-Sloss is the second Black woman to serve as the mayor of Dayton and the third Black woman to serve on the Dayton City Commission. She is also a logistics management specialist at Wright-Patterson Air Force Base. Although the office of mayor is non-partisan, Turner-Sloss is a member of the Working Families Party.

== Education ==
Tuner-Sloss is a graduate of Dayton Public Schools. She graduated in 2004 from Fisk University, a historically black university, with a Bachelor of Arts in political science. In 2009, she graduated from Central Michigan University with a Master of Science in administration. She is a member of Delta Sigma Theta.

== Early career ==
Turner-Sloss started her career after graduation as a city of Dayton employee in the Planning & Community Development Department, where she was a Senior Community Development Specialist and was responsible for allocating federal and state grants to the city.

In 2013, Turner-Sloss began work at Wright-Patterson Air Force Base as a logistics management specialist in the Air Force Life Cycle Management Center, where she joined the AFGE union. In 2024 she was selected to participate in the LEADership Wright-Patt program, a five-month program designed to develop current and prospective leaders at the base.

In 2015, Turner-Sloss co-founded the non-profit Neighborhoods Over Politics and led efforts to direct over $7.6 million in local investments into projects that "uplift communities, generate economic opportunity and improve housing conditions for Daytonians."

== Political career ==
Turner-Sloss was first elected to the city commission in 2021, garnering about 29% of the votes in the four-way general election. She campaigned alongside incumbent commissioner Darryl Fairchild, who finished in second and was re-elected to another term. In that election Turner-Sloss was endorsed by the Ohio Working Families Party, Our Revolution Ohio, the Dayton chapter of the Sunrise Movement, and other progressive organizations and labor unions including her own, the American Federation of Government Employees local 1138.

Though a member of the Democratic Party, she has been considered "outside the establishment". She was not endorsed by the Montgomery County Democratic Party during any of her campaigns, including the successful one in 2021 for Commissioner or 2025 for Mayor. In fact, in 2021 the Montgomery County Democratic Party released attack ads against Turner-Sloss and Fairchild, for which the Ohio Democratic Party issued an apology, stating that the ads "violated several of their mailer policies.". The controversy resulted in the resignation of the county party's Executive Director, the retirement of the county party Chair, and an official apology of the county party Central Committee which stated that "Commissioner Fairchild and candidate Turner-Sloss – and all their supporters – are valued members of the county party."

=== City commission ===
As city commissioner, Turner-Sloss advocated for increased funding for affordable housing, youth programming, and the fire department.

During the 2023 budget negotiations which threatened to result in a city government shutdown, Turner-Sloss and fellow commissioner Darryl Fairchild secured an additional $1 million in funding for youth programming.

In the eventually successful 2025 income tax levy renewal, Turner-Sloss advocated for allocating $650,000 per year for housing programming. She was also responsible for "getting the city to approve its first-ever housing policy framework, which will be a roadmap to addressing the city's growing housing crisis."

=== Mayor of Dayton ===
Turner-Sloss ran against incumbent mayor Jeff Mims in the 2025 Dayton mayoral election on a platform to "increase the median income, improve housing conditions, support more programs that assist with homeownership and build more affordable housing." Turner-Sloss was elected mayor with almost 52% of the vote. She was sworn in as mayor on January 5, 2026.

== Electoral history ==
=== 2017 ===
November 7, 2017 general - City of Dayton - Commission
Party	Candidate	Votes	%
Nonpartisan	Joey D. Williams (incumbent)	9,022	30.14
Nonpartisan	Jeff Mims (incumbent)	7,950	26.56
Nonpartisan	Darryl Fairchild	6,783	22.66
Nonpartisan	Shenise Turner-Sloss	6,174	20.63
Total votes		29,929	100

=== 2019 ===
City of Dayton - Commission
Primary election
Party	Candidate	Votes	%
Nonpartisan	Matt Joseph (incumbent)	2,405	28.13
Nonpartisan	Christopher Shaw (incumbent)	2,168	25.35
Nonpartisan	Shenise Turner-Sloss	1,845	21.58
Nonpartisan	David Esrati	1,116	13.05
Nonpartisan	Valerie Duncan	1,017	11.89
Total votes		8,551	100
General election
Nonpartisan	Matt Joseph (incumbent)	7,488	28.87
Nonpartisan	Christopher Shaw (incumbent)	6,845	30.09
Nonpartisan	Shenise Turner-Sloss	5,910	25.98
Nonpartisan	David Esrati	3,027	13.31
Total votes		25,936	100

=== 2021 ===
City of Dayton - Commission
Primary election
Party	Candidate	Votes	%
Nonpartisan	Shenise Turner-Sloss	3,176	20.85
Nonpartisan	Stacey D. Benson-Taylor	2,829	18.58
Nonpartisan	Darryl Fairchild (Incumbent)	2,631	17.28
Nonpartisan	Scott Sliver	2,213	14.53
Nonpartisan	Jared Grandy	1,949	12.80
Nonpartisan	Jordan Wortham	1,349	8.86
Nonpartisan	Valerie Duncan	1,083	7.11
Total votes		15,230	100
General election
Nonpartisan	Shenise Turner-Sloss	7,488	28.87
Nonpartisan	Darryl Fairchild (incumbent)	7,442	28.69
Nonpartisan	Stacey D. Benson-Taylor	6,076	23.43
Nonpartisan	Scott Sliver	4,930	19.01
Total votes		25,936	100

=== 2025 ===
November 4, 2025 general - City of Dayton - Mayor
Party	Candidate	Votes	%
Nonpartisan	Shenise Turner-Sloss	8,541	51.87
Nonpartisan	Jeff Mims (incumbent)	7,926	48.13

== Personal life ==
Turner-Sloss lives with her husband Chad, a professor who teaches at Antioch University and Wittenberg University, along with their three children in Dayton's Southern View neighborhood.

She is a member of the NAACP, Delta Sigma Theta, the American Federation of Government Employees - Local 1138, Our Revolution, Higher Heights, Matriots, and the Working Families Party.
