= Jeff Mims =

American politician (born 1947)

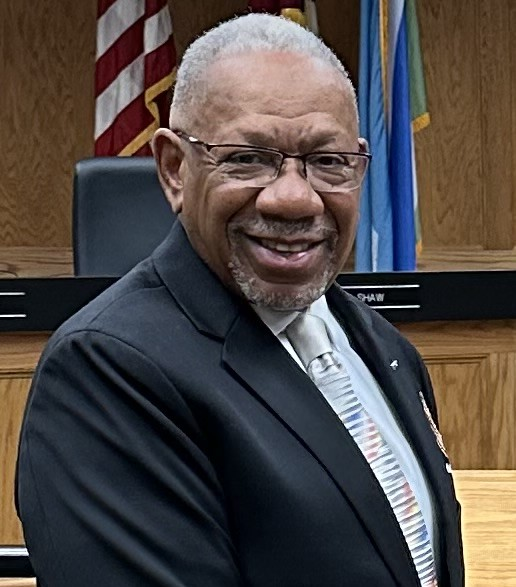
- Mims in 2022

57th Mayor of Dayton, Ohio
- In office January 3, 2022 – January 5, 2026
- Preceded by: Nan Whaley
- Succeeded by: Shenise Turner-Sloss

Personal details
- Born: Jeffrey J. Mims Jr. January 27, 1947 (age 79) Dayton, Ohio, U.S.
- Party: Democratic
- Spouse: Toni Mims
- Education: Central State University (BA); Wright State University (MSE)

Jeffrey J. Mims Jr. (born January 27, 1947) is an American politician who served as the 57th mayor of Dayton, Ohio from 2022 to 2026. A member of the Democratic Party, he was elected as mayor on November 2, 2021, after he served on the city commission for two terms.

== Education ==
Mims graduated from Central State University in 1973, and was inducted into the Central State University Alumni Achievement Hall of Fame in 2014. He received his Master of Science degree in Education from Wright State University in 1975.

== Mayor of Dayton ==
In November 2022, Mims was chosen to serve as the chair of the National League of Cities (NLC) Mayors' Education Task Force.

In August 2023, Mims collaborated with Congressman Mike Turner and Mackensie Wittmer, Executive Director of the National Aviation Heritage Area, to discuss the strategy for how to rehabilitate the Wright Company Factory after a devastating fire.

In 2025, Mims was defeated in his bid for re-election by Shenise Turner-Sloss.

== Personal life ==
Mims is married to Toni Mims. Together, they have three children and three grandchildren.
