= Lloyd E. Lewis Jr. =

American politician

Member of the Ohio House of Representatives from the 38th district
- In office January 3, 1995-January 4, 1998
- Preceded by: Rhine McLin
- Succeeded by: Dixie Allen

Personal details
- Born: November 17, 1926 Xenia, Ohio, United States
- Died: March 31, 2001 (aged 74) Kettering, Ohio, United States
- Party: Democratic
- Spouse: Edythe Lewis

Lloyd E. Lewis Jr. was a former member of the Ohio House of Representatives. A native of Dayton, Lewis served as a former assistant city manager for Dayton and as a member of the city plan board. He also once was a general manager for Rike's downtown, and served as DP&L's assistant vice president for community relations, recruiting and customer relations. He was married to Edythe Lewis.
