= C. J. McLin =

American politician

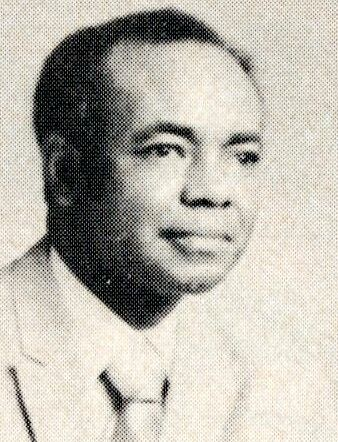

Member of the Ohio House of Representatives from the 36th district
- In office January 3, 1967 – December 12, 1988
- Preceded by: District created
- Succeeded by: Rhine McLin

Personal details
- Born: Clarence Josef McLin Jr. East St. Louis, Illinois, U.S.
- Died: Dayton, Ohio, U.S.
- Party: Democratic
- Children: 3, including Rhine
- Parent: Mac McLin (father)

Clarence Josef McLin Jr. was an American mortician and politician who served as a member of the Ohio House of Representatives for the 36th district from 1967 to 1988. His father was civil rights leader Mac McLin.

== Early life ==
McLin was born in East St. Louis, Illinois and moved with his family to Dayton, Ohio in 1931, where he attended Dunbar High School and worked at the family business, the McLin Funeral Home. As a youth, McLin filed a civil rights lawsuit against McCrory's, a dime store at Fourth and Main streets in Dayton, for the store's refusal to serve him because of his race.

== Career ==
McLin was elected to the Ohio House of Representatives in 1966 and assumed office in 1967. During his 22-year-long tenure, McLin became known as a powerful member of the House. He was also a close ally of Speaker Vern Riffe. He also co-founded, with State Representative Larry G. Smith, the Black Elected Democrats of Ohio (later the Ohio Legislative Black Caucus) in 1967.

McLin was sworn in a twelfth term in 1988, but died a few days later. He was the longest-serving black legislator in Ohio history at the time of his death. His daughter, Rhine McLin was appointed to fill his seat.

== Personal life ==
He was the father of Clarence Josef, Rhine, and Scherrie McLin. The US 35 expressway in west Dayton, which was completed in October 1996, is designated the C. J. McLin Jr. Parkway in honor of McLin's longtime advocacy for and work toward the construction of such a highway.
