= Morris Seely =

American politician

Morris Seely (1795–1847) was an American businessman and politician who served on the Ohio Senate, Ohio House of Representatives, and as mayor of Dayton, Ohio. His failed canal project through Dayton's South Park neighborhood came to be known as "Seely's Ditch" or "Seely's Folly" and still has an impact today of projects in the area.

== Early life and business career ==
Morris Seely was born in 1795. Little is known about his early life, until Seely arrives on public record in a land transfer in 1819.

On April 25, 1827, Morris Seely married Catherine Huffman, the daughter of businessman William Huffman.

That same year, Seely worked as a contractor leading four sections the Miami Canal through Dayton. The terrain proved tough to excavate, and vastly underbid the project.

Following the experience, Seely pursued a new idea: "a new navigable canal through the undeveloped area east of town and east of the new Miami Canal connecting the canal's Mad River feeder from near today's Wayne Avenue to the main line of the canal below town near the Fairgrounds hill."

Much of the land Seely sought to purchase and plat was owned by Daniel Cooper and his estate. The Cooper estate sued, and a land ordeal followed. Eventually parts of the land Seely needed for his project was leased by the state elsewhere, which eliminated the chance for a canal, even though the Ohio Supreme Court later ruled against the Cooper estate. The section that had been dug remained for almost 60 years as nothing more than a drainage ditch, and become known as "Seely's Ditch."

Eventually Seely's work on the ditch led to his financial demise, filing bankruptcy in 1842.

== Political career ==
Prior to Seely's Ditch, Seely served in the Ohio Senate from 1829 to 1830.

In 1833 Seely won election to the Ohio House of Representatives, where he served one term.

In 1838, Seely joined others as they attempted to shift the path of the first interstate highway, "National Road" (US-40 today), through Dayton instead of directly west to Indiana from Springfield. While the road came close, the committee valued a straight road that would not dip south.

In 1841, Seely was elected mayor of Dayton. He served one month, and resigned.

== Death ==
Morris Seely died in 1847, at the age of 52. There are many questions about the location of his grave. By many accounts, he is believed to be buried in single grave purchased by his son, William Morris Seely, across from his wife Catherine, who died two years earlier. Allegedly this is because Seely's failures did not gain him approval with his in-laws, Dayton's prestigious Huffman family, and they would not allow them to be buried together.
