= Bootsie Neal =

American politician (1952–2021)

Idotha "Bootsie" Neal (September 9, 1952 – January 24, 2021) was a politician and developer in Dayton, Ohio and a member of the Democratic Party.

Born in Newbern, Alabama, she grew up in Buffalo, New York. In 1991, she became the first African-American woman elected to Dayton's city commission, on which she served until 2004. Since then, she worked on redevelopment of Dayton's historic urban neighborhoods.

She served until 2014 as president of an organization dedicated to Wright-Dunbar, the historical Dayton neighborhood that was the site of the Wright Brothers' bicycle shop and the birthplace of the African-American poet Paul Laurence Dunbar.
