= Mike Turner =

American politician (born 1960)

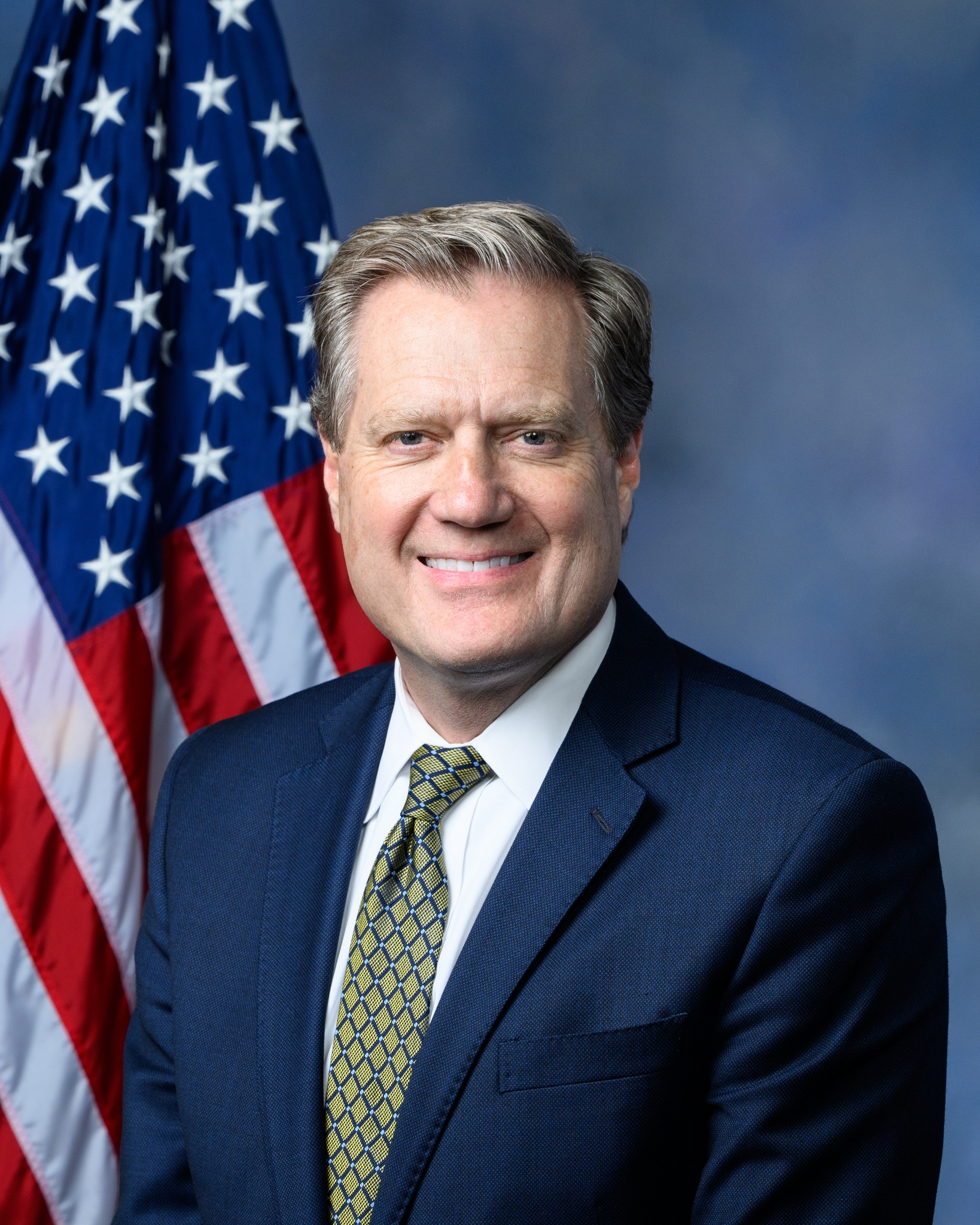
- Official portrait, 2023

Member of the U.S. House of Representatives from Ohio
- Incumbent
- Assumed office January 3, 2003
- Preceded by: Tony P. Hall
- Constituency: 3rd district (2003–2013); 10th district (2013–present)
House positions
Chair of the House Intelligence Committee
In office January 9, 2023 – January 15, 2025
Preceded by	Adam Schiff
Succeeded by	Rick Crawford
Ranking Member of the House Intelligence Committee
In office January 1, 2022 – January 3, 2023
Preceded by	Devin Nunes
Succeeded by	Jim Himes

President of the NATO Parliamentary Assembly
- In office November 24, 2014 – November 19, 2016
- Preceded by: Hugh Bayley
- Succeeded by: Paolo Alli

53rd Mayor of Dayton
- In office January 4, 1994 – January 4, 2002
- Preceded by: Clay Dixon
- Succeeded by: Rhine McLin

Personal details
- Born: Michael Ray Turner; January 11, 1960 (age 66) Dayton, Ohio, U.S.
- Party: Republican
- Spouses: Lori Turner (m. 1987; div. 2013); Majida Mourad (m. 2015; div. 2018)
- Children: 2
- Education: Ohio Northern University (BA); Case Western Reserve University (JD); University of Dayton (MBA); Georgetown University (DLS)
- Website: House website Campaign website
- Turner's voice Turner introducing witnesses at a House Intelligence Committee hearing Recorded February 8, 2023

Michael Ray Turner (born January 11, 1960) is an American politician serving in the U.S. House of Representatives since 2003, representing Ohio's 10th congressional district. The district, numbered as the 3rd district for his first five terms, is based in Dayton. Before serving in Congress, Turner served as mayor of Dayton from 1994 to 2002. He is a member of the Republican Party.

Turner was first elected to Congress in 2002. While in the House, he was also president of the NATO Parliamentary Assembly from 2014 to 2016. From 2022 to 2025, he was a member of the House Intelligence Committee, serving as its chair from 2023 before his removal from the position. He lost re-election in 2026.

He is a member of the moderate Republican Governance Group.

== Early life, education, and career ==
Turner was born in 1960 in Dayton, Ohio, to Vivian and Ray Turner. His mother was a teacher for the Huber Heights City School District and his father worked as a member of IUE Local 801 for 42 years after serving in the military. Turner was raised in East Dayton and has one sister. He is a non-denominational Protestant.

Turner graduated from Belmont High School in 1978 and received his Bachelor of Arts in political science from the Ohio Northern University in 1982, a Juris Doctor from Case Western Reserve University in 1985, a Master of Business Administration from the University of Dayton in 1992, and a Doctor of Liberal Studies in urban economic development from Georgetown University in 2022. He practiced law with local firms and businesses in the Dayton area before entering politics. He also practiced law during the brief time between his service as mayor of Dayton and as a member of Congress.

== Mayor of Dayton ==
Turner was elected mayor of Dayton, Ohio, in 1993, narrowly defeating incumbent Mayor Richard Clay Dixon. Before he took office, the city suffered a number of economic setbacks. Upon taking office, Turner focused on attracting business to the city and on redeveloping vacant and underutilized real estate packages known as brownfields.

During Turner's mayoralty, Dayton reached an agreement to construct a baseball stadium for a class A minor league team affiliated with the Cincinnati Reds.

Turner was the mayor of Dayton during the planning and construction of the Schuster Center, which he supported for its contribution to reviving downtown. He facilitated discussions with key leaders from the project's conception to its completion. The Schuster Center is a performing arts center at the corner of Second and Main Streets. It has served as a forum for the Victoria Theatre's Broadway Series, the Dayton Philharmonic Orchestra, the Dayton Ballet, and a speaking location for visiting political leaders, such as former New York governor Mario Cuomo.

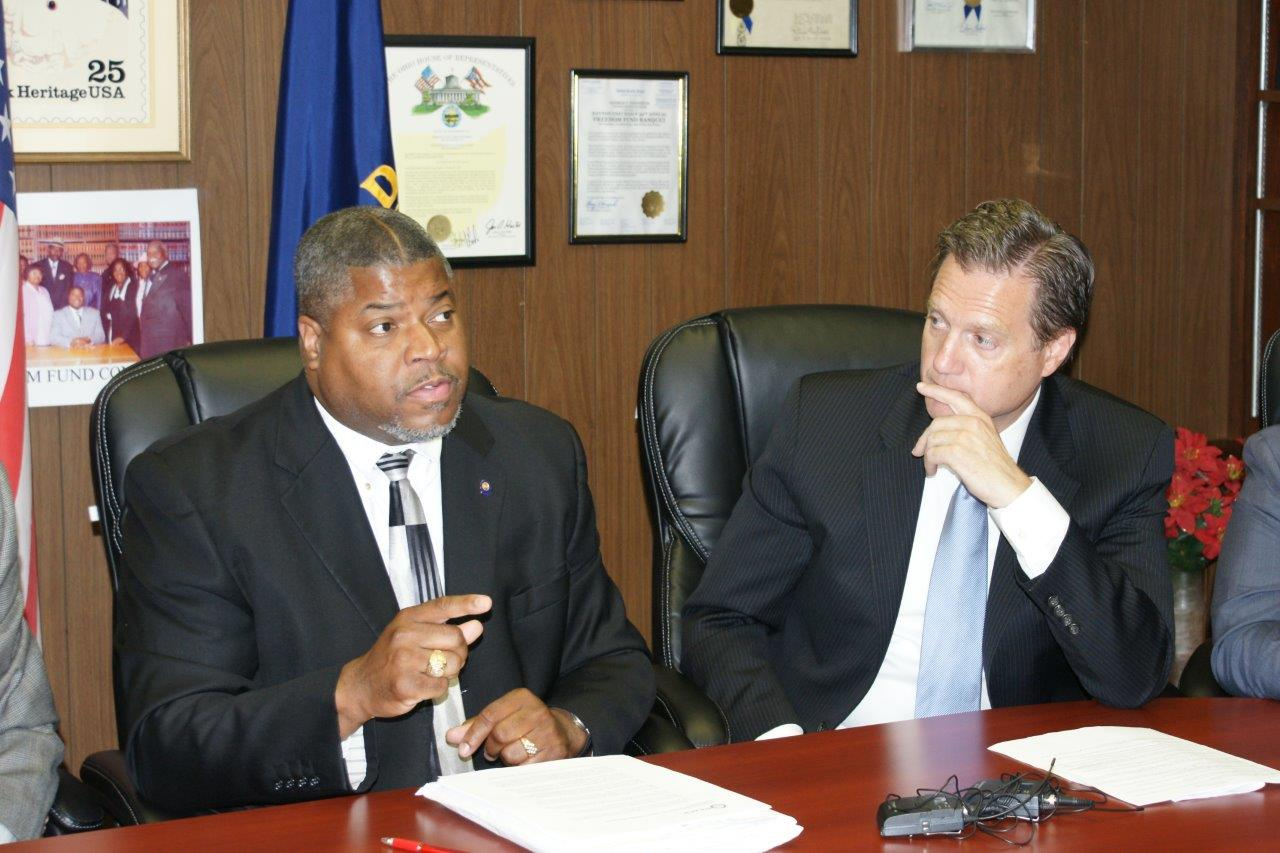
Dayton NAACP president Derrick Foward urges Congressman Turner to support Affordable Care Act and The Voting Rights Amendment Act of 2015.

Turner also started a program called "Rehabarama", which attracted professionals to historic properties in the city. He was reelected in 1997 over Democratic city commissioner Tony Capizzi. In 2001 he lost to then state senator Rhine McLin, 51.6% to 48.4%.

== U.S. House of Representatives ==
=== Elections ===
2002

Turner received 58% of the vote following the retirement of 23-year incumbent Democrat Tony P. Hall from Congress after President George W. Bush named Hall U.N. special envoy for hunger issues. Earlier that year, Turner won the Republican nomination when he defeated Roy Brown with 80% of the vote. Brown was the son and grandson of former area Republican congressmen Bud Brown and Clarence J. Brown and operated a local newspaper company, Brown Publishing. In the general election, Turner defeated Congressman Tony Hall's chief of staff, Rick Carne, after Carne won the Democratic nomination. Turner got a substantial assist from the 2000s round of redistricting. The old 3rd had been a fairly compact district centered on Dayton, but redistricting added some Republican-leaning suburbs to the east.

2004

In 2004, Turner defeated former businesswoman Jane Mitakides with over 62% of the vote. The district was considered a key area in the swing state of Ohio in that year's presidential race.

2006

In 2006, the Democrats planned to target Turner for defeat. Three Democrats entered the Third District primary to run against Turner in the general election. Veterinarian Stephanie Studebaker defeated local bankruptcy attorney David Fierst and recalled Waynesville mayor Charles W. Sanders. Studebaker had previously affiliated with former Vermont governor Howard Dean's 2004 presidential campaign in Ohio. After winning the nomination, she and her husband Sam were both arrested for domestic violence. Studebaker subsequently dropped out of the race, citing her family concerns and impending legal issues. After her withdrawal, four Democrats entered a special primary to face Turner, won by former assistant United States attorney Richard Chema. Turner defeated Chema with 58% of the vote.

2008

Jane Mitakides beat Sanders in the Democratic primary and faced Turner in a rematch from 2004. Turner again focused largely on economic issues of job creation and protection for workers affected by the national and regional recession. In a difficult political climate for Republicans, Turner defeated Mitakides with 64% of the vote, his largest margin of victory in any election.

2010

Turner was challenged by first-time Democratic nominee 25-year-old Joe Roberts in the general election and won with 68% of the vote.

2012

After redistricting, Turner's district was renumbered the 10th district. It absorbed much of the neighboring 7th district, represented by fellow Republican Steve Austria. The district was made significantly more compact than its predecessor, absorbing all of Dayton.

It initially looked like Turner would face Austria in a primary, but Austria dropped out of the race, handing Turner the nomination. Turner then defeated Democratic attorney Sharon Neuhardt with 60% of the vote.

2020

Turner was challenged in the 2020 Republican primary by Kathi Flanders.

2026

Turner was defeated in the November 3, 2026, general election by Kristina Knickerbocker, an Air Force veteran and nurse practitioner from Yellow Springs, in his closest race since his initial election in 2002. Although Turner carried two of the district's three counties, he could not overcome a 19,000-vote deficit in his home county of Montgomery County. Most news outlets called the race for Knickerbocker on November 5.

=== Tenure ===
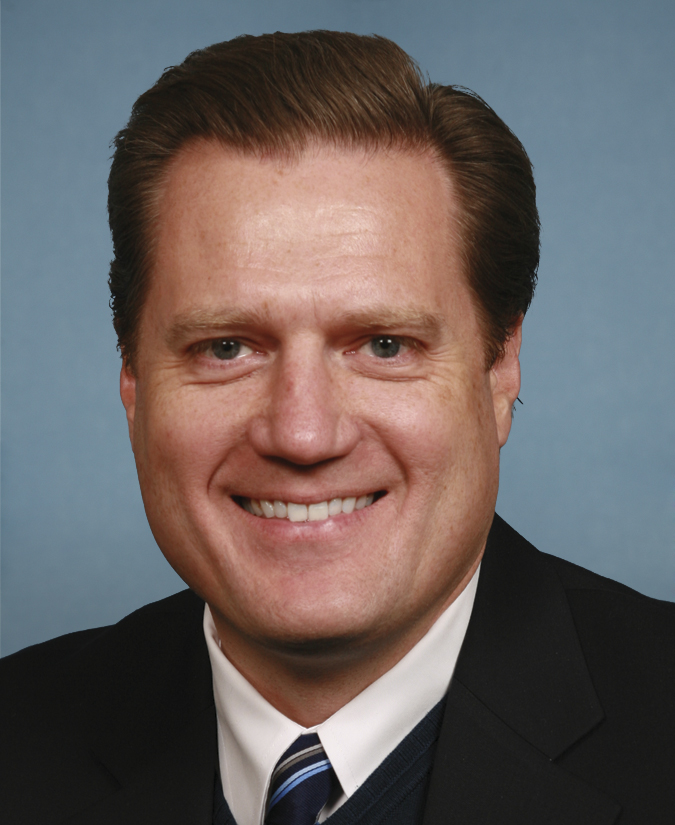
Turner during the 112th Congress

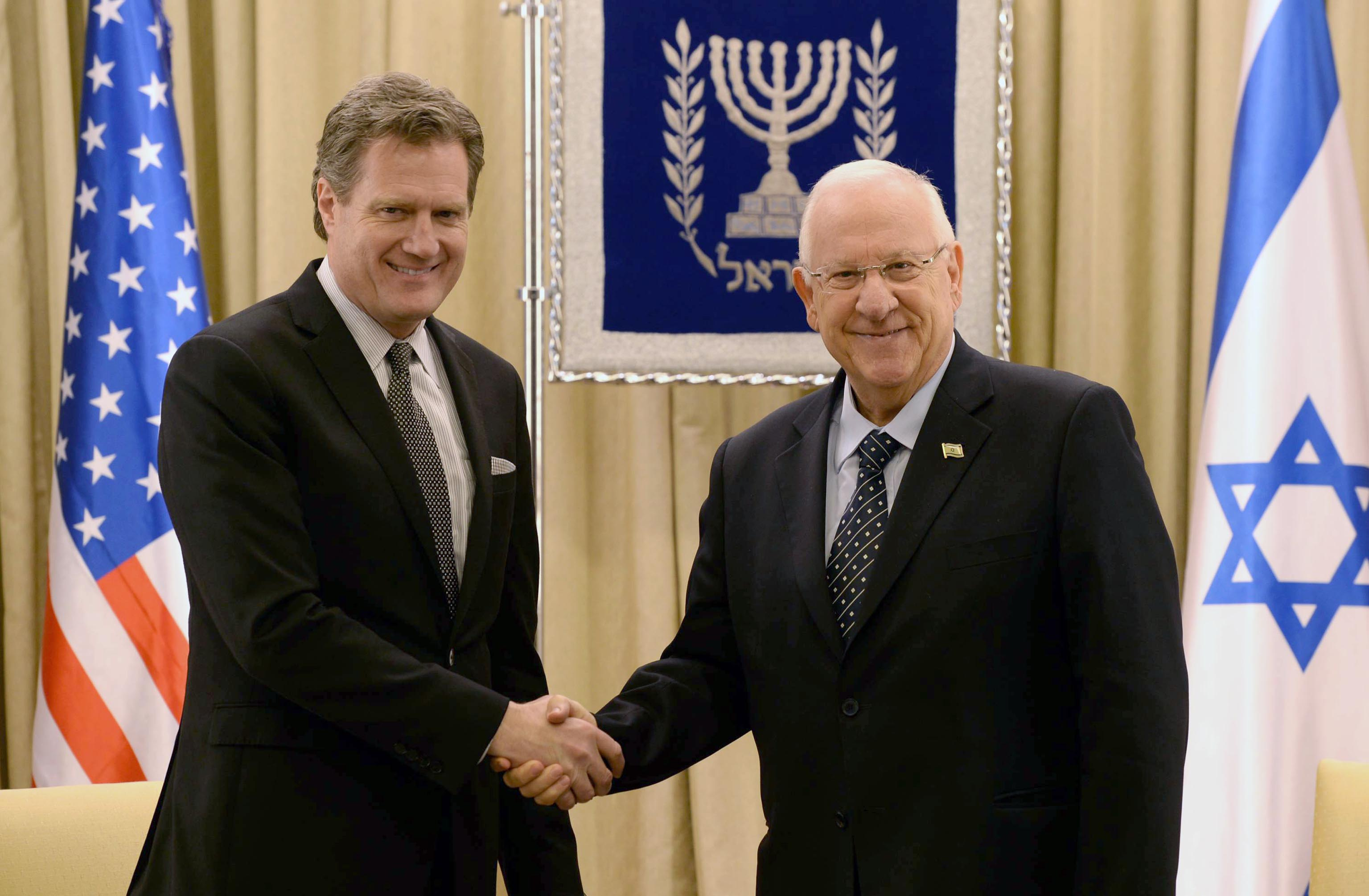
Turner with Israeli president Reuven Rivlin in 2015

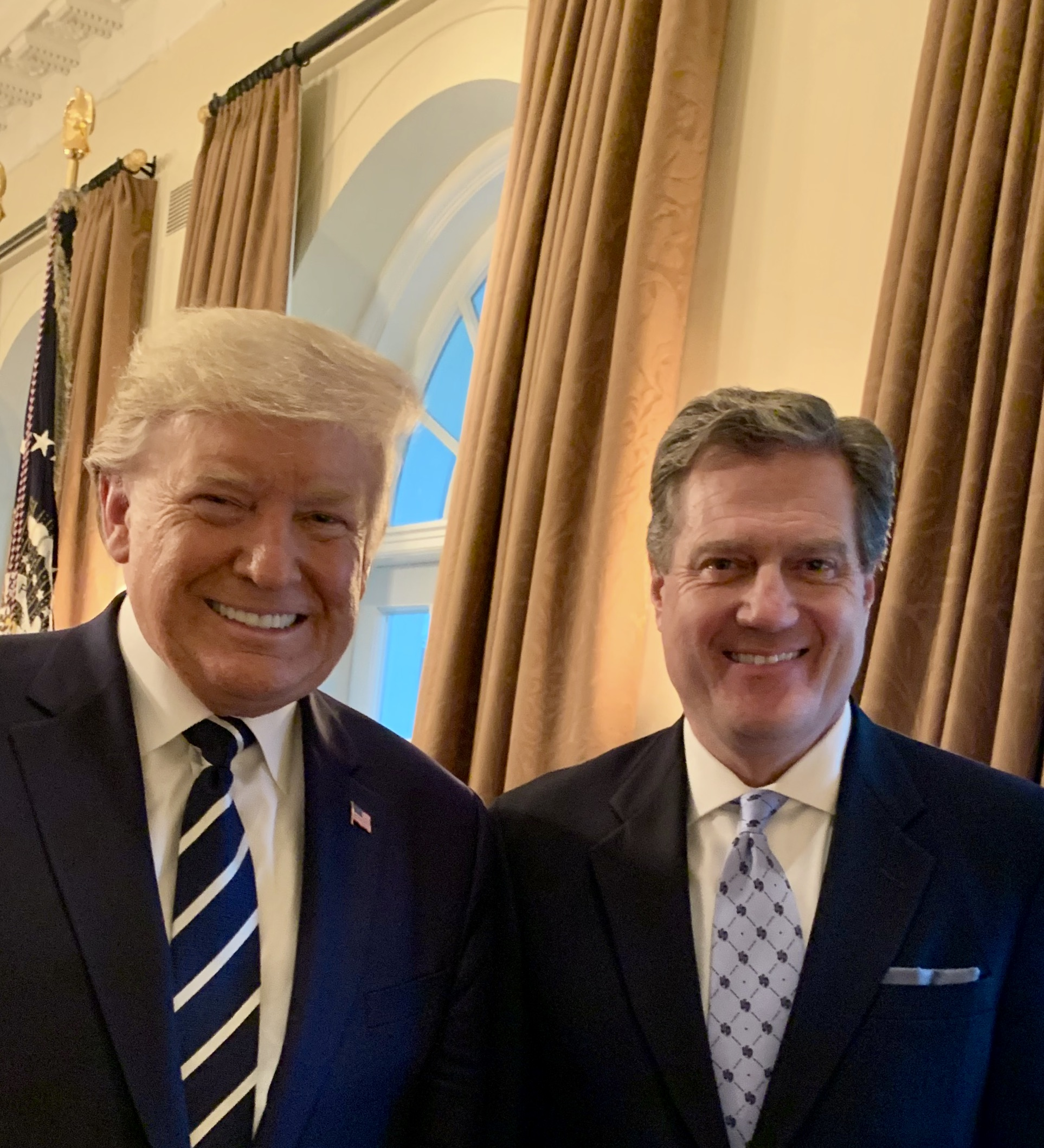
Turner with President Donald Trump in 2020

In January 2003, Turner was appointed to the Armed Services and Government Reform committees. In 2009, he was named Ranking Member on the Strategic Forces Subcommittee of the United States House Committee on Armed Services.

Due to his urban background, focus on the economic redevelopment of cities, and service as Dayton's mayor, Turner is sometimes described as an "urban Republican". Recognizing Turner's work on urban development, then-House Speaker Dennis Hastert appointed Turner chair of the Saving America's Cities working group. The group was formed to work with the Bush administration to "foster economic development and redevelopment and streamline government services in America's cities to help them prosper and grow."

During the 109th Congress, Turner served on the House Veterans' Affairs Committee, in addition to his work on his two other committees, the House Armed Services and Government Reform Committees.

Serving on the Armed Services Committee, Turner advocated for an expansion to Wright-Patterson Air Force Base, providing testimony to the Base Realignment and Closure Commission (BRAC). This effort proved successful in 2008, when the Air Force announced that 1,000 jobs and over $230 million in federal funding would move to Wright-Patterson AFB. Turner has said that this is the largest single investment in Wright-Patterson since World War II.

In 2006, the Dayton Development Coalition (DDC), a nonprofit and nominally nonpartisan group (though most of the trustees have contributed to Turner's campaigns) that advocates for federal funds for economic development in the Miami Valley, began a regional branding campaign. Turner's wife's company Turner Effect was awarded a contract without competitive bidding to conduct the marketing research associated with the campaign. In April 2008, Turner Effect withdrew from the branding implementation contract after more details of the agreement became public, including details about the more than $300,000 awarded to her company.

The DDC said that its members were "unanimous" in their decision that there was "no conflict [of interest]" in their having chosen Turner's company, but watchdog groups and media reports raised concerns about a possible conflict of interest.

In the same year, Turner's campaign committee Citizens for Turner contracted with Turner Effect for professional services, such as the production of literature.

On July 7, 2008, Turner wrote an op-ed in the Hillsboro Times-Gazette in support of the Post-9/11 Veterans Educational Assistance Act of 2008, referred to as the GI Bill.

In October 2008, Turner joined then Senator Hillary Clinton, First Lady Laura Bush, Senator Pete Domenici and Representative Brad Miller to announce the introduction of bipartisan legislation that would permanently authorize two historic preservation grant programs. The bill, H.R. 3981, would permanently authorize the programs known as "Save America's Treasures", established by the Clinton administration, and "Preserve America", established by the Bush administration. It was introduced in the House by Turner and Miller as co-chairs of the Congressional Historic Preservation Caucus and in the Senate by Clinton and Domenici. The two grant programs are complementary. Preserve America supports "community efforts to demonstrate sustainable uses of their historic and cultural sites, focusing on economic and educational opportunities related to heritage tourism." The Save America's Treasures grant program "funds 'bricks-and-mortar' projects by helping local communities develop sustainable resource management strategies and sound business practices for the continued preservation and use of heritage assets."

Turner voted against the Patient Protection and Affordable Care Act and the Health Care and Education Reconciliation Act of 2010 and in the coming years repeatedly voted for its repeal. He opposed the "$1 trillion government takeover of our nation's health care system" because it would "increase budget deficits and decrease the quality of our health care services", he said.

Turner was highly critical of the Obama administration's Phased Adaptive Approach and Nuclear Posture Review regarding the protection and defense of the U.S. and allies.

In 2012, Turner called for a missile defense site on the east coast of the United States, to defend against missiles launched from Iran. The east coast site would be the third such site, joining two others on the west coast designed to defend against an attack from North Korea.

In 2018, Turner was named to the United States House Permanent Select Committee on Intelligence. That year, Turner pushed for the establishment of the National Advanced Air Mobility Center of Excellence in Ohio, catalyzing the facility's eventual construction at the Springfield–Beckley Municipal Airport.

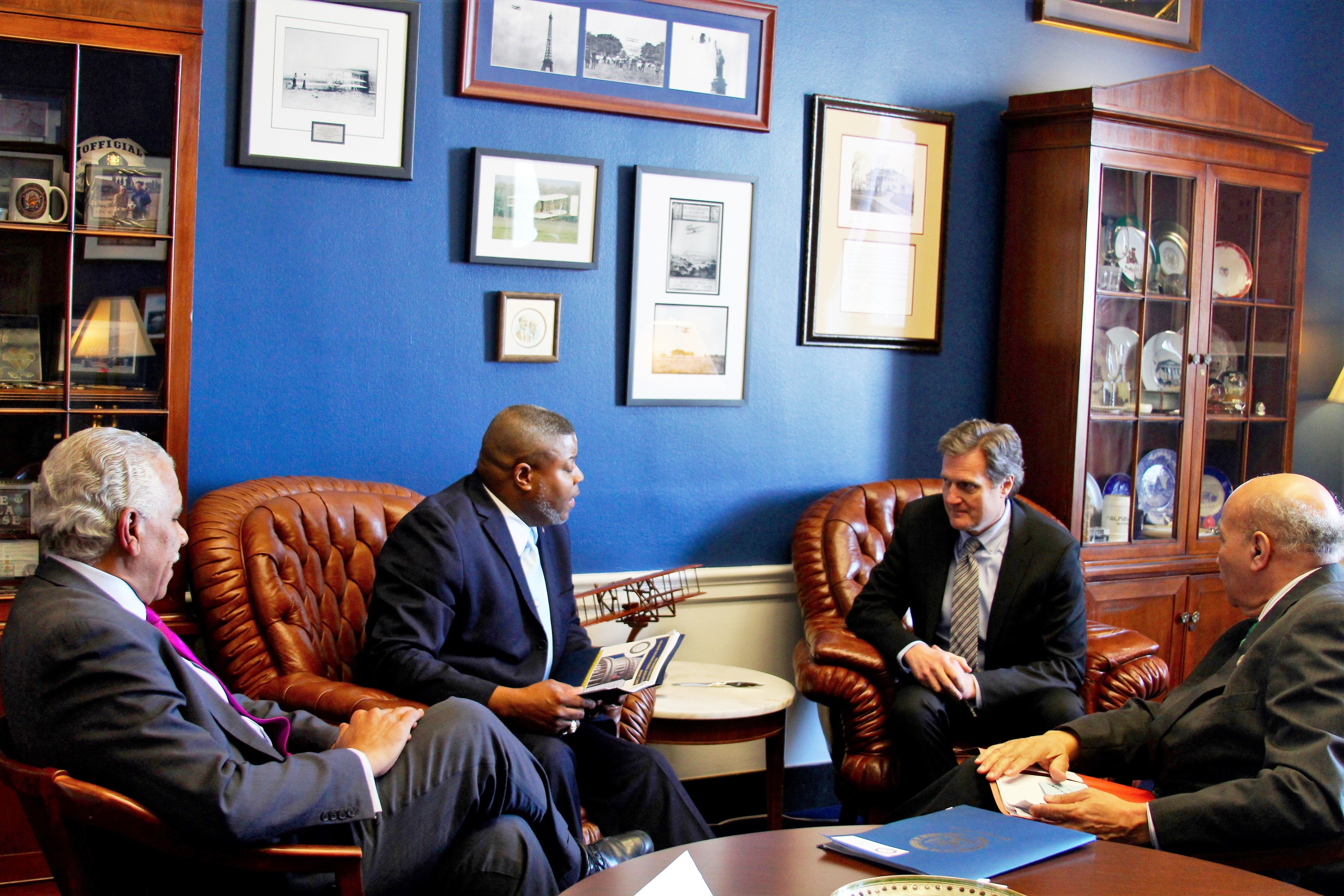
Dayton NAACP president Derrick Foward, former Ohio senator Tom Roberts and Hilary O. Shelton, Director of the NAACP Washington Bureau, Lobbying Congressman Mike Turner on gun reform, Affordable Care Act and voting rights

In 2018 and 2019 he "led the Ohio congressional delegation... in advocating to bring the F-35 program" to Wright-Patterson Air Force Base, which happened in May 2019. As of May 2019, he was the top Republican on the House Armed Service's Strategic Forces Subcommittee. In April 2019, he created a panel to "independently review" the water quality in the Dayton area.

Turner was one of three Ohio Republicans appointed to an Intelligence Committee that examined whether Trump had improperly withheld aid to Ukraine. He stated the conversation between Trump and the Ukrainian president was "not ok", but that impeachment was an "assault" on the electorate. On November 19, 2019, Trump praised his questioning of witnesses in the impeachment inquiry in a tweet.

In February 2022, Turner promoted debunked lies about the pleadings John Durham filed as special prosecutor, claiming that they proved that Hillary Clinton "spied" on Trump's presidential campaign and on Trump's White House. Durham denied in open court that these allegations are a truthful interpretation of his pleadings, but Turner continued to publicly disseminate the allegations.

Following accusations that Donald Trump had kept classified documents at Mar-a-Lago after his presidency ended, Turner said on Fox News that he thought the matter was "more like a bookkeeping issue than it is a national security threat".

On March 18, 2024, Turner indicated that he did not believe Donald Trump had been calling for violence when he used the word "blood bath" in a speech. "The president's statements concerning 'blood bath' were about what would happen in the auto industry if actually the Chinese manufacturers who are coming into Mexico were permitted to import into the United States," Turner said.

On January 15, 2025, Turner was removed as chair of the House Intelligence Committee by Speaker of the House Mike Johnson ahead of Donald Trump's second presidential term. Turner said that Johnson cited "concerns from Mar-a-Lago" when removing him, while Johnson denied to reporters that the removal was a "President Trump decision".

=== Political positions ===
==== 2020 election ====
Turner did not join the majority of Republican members of Congress who signed an amicus brief in support of Texas v. Pennsylvania, a lawsuit filed at the United States Supreme Court contesting the results of the 2020 presidential election.

Turner voted to certify both Arizona's and Pennsylvania's results in the 2021 United States Electoral College vote count.

==== China ====
In June 2020, Turner cosponsored the Holding China Accountable Act, which would restrict visas for Chinese nationals entering the United States to study, work, or attend business meetings in “science, technology, engineering, mathematics, or a related field.”

==== Gun control ====
After the Dayton shooting in August 2019, Turner announced he would back legislation barring the "sale of military-style weapons to civilians" and also said he would support a limit on magazines and the creation of legislation that would keep guns from people deemed dangerous by the police. He had previously "generally backed gun-rights measures during his nine terms in the House", earning a 93% approval and "A" rating from the NRA Political Victory Fund (NRA-PVF) in prior years. Turner's daughter had been across the street from the attack. For the 2020 election the NRA-PVF gave Turner a "D" rating.

==== Sutorina dispute involvement ====
On March 3, 2015, Montenegrin, Bosnian, and other Balkan-based news agencies reported that Turner had involved himself in the Sutorina dispute between Bosnia and Herzegovina and Montenegro, sending a letter of warning to then-Bosniak member of the Presidency of Bosnia and Herzegovina Bakir Izetbegović in which he suggested that if Bosnia and Herzegovina did not give up its territorial dispute over Sutorina, the United States might suspend its aid to the country. The dispute was later resolved peacefully, with Bosnia and Herzegovina ultimately dismissing its claims.

==== 2025 Bosnian constitutional crisis and Republika Srpska–Dayton Accords dispute ====
In March 2025, Turner criticized Milorad Dodik, the president of Bosnia and Herzegovina's Republika Srpska entity, alleging that Dodik was undermining the Dayton Peace Accords and seeking support from Russian president Vladimir Putin to destabilize the Balkans. Turner emphasized the importance of U.S. and NATO involvement to promote peace and stability in Bosnia and Herzegovina.

=== Committee assignments ===
- Committee on Intelligence (ranking member (2022-2023); chairman (2023-2025))
- Committee on Armed Services
  - Subcommittee on Tactical Air and Land Forces (former chairman)
  - Subcommittee on Strategic Forces

=== Caucus memberships ===
- Republican Governance Group
- Republican Main Street Partnership
- Republican Study Committee

== Electoral history ==
Ohio's 3rd congressional district: Results 2002–2010
Year	Democrat	Votes	Pct	Republican	Votes	Pct	
2002	Rick Carne	78,307	41%	Michael R. Turner	111,630	59%	*
2004	Jane Mitakides	119,448	38%	Michael R. Turner	197,290	62%	
2006	Richard Chema	90,650	41%	Michael R. Turner	127,978	59%	
2008	Jane Mitakides	115,976	37%	Michael R. Turner	200,204	63%	
2010	Joe Roberts	71,455	32%	Michael R. Turner	152,629	68%	

*In 2002, Ronald Williamitis received 14 votes.

Ohio's 10th congressional district: Results 2012–2024
Year	Democrat	Votes	Pct	Independent/Libertarian	Votes	Pct	Republican	Votes	Pct	
2012	Sharen Neuhardt	131,097	37%	David Harlow	10,373	3%	Michael R. Turner	208,201	60%	
2014	Robert Klepinger	63,249	32%	David Harlow	6,605	3%	Michael R. Turner	130,752	65%	
2016	Robert Klepinger	109,981	33%	Tom McMasters	10,890	3%	Michael R. Turner	215,724	64%	*
2018	Theresa A. Gasper	118,785	42%	David Harlow	5,387	2%	Michael R. Turner	157,554	56%	
2020	Desiree Tims	151,976	42%				Michael R. Turner	212,972	58%	
2022	David Esrati	104,634	38%				Michael R. Turner	168,327	61%	
2024	Amy Cox	145,420	39%	Michael Harbaugh	11,631	3%	Michael R. Turner	213,695	58%	

*In 2016, David Harlow received 7 votes.

== Controversies ==
=== Allegations of self-enrichment ===
In both 2008 and 2010, Turner was listed as one of the "most corrupt members of Congress" by the Citizens for Responsibility and Ethics in Washington for "enrichment of self, family, or friends" and "solicitation of gifts".

According to analysis conducted by the Dayton Daily News in 2016, when Turner came to Congress in 2002, he reported between $153,026 and $695,000 worth of assets on his financial disclosure form. In 2016, he claimed between $2.8 million and $10.3 million. The paper credited his second marriage to an energy lobbyist as a contributing reason for the increase, since her assets as well as his were listed on his 2016 financial disclosure form. Their relationship raised red flags when Turner was accused of authoring natural gas legislation that might benefit her employer at the time, Cheniere Energy.

=== Absence of local town halls ===
At multiple times during his tenure in Congress, Turner has faced protests from constituents for refusing to host public town hall events, presumably over fear that the events would draw strong backlash from constituents over Turner's repeated efforts to repeal the Affordable Care Act, as Republicans in neighboring districts and around the country had experienced.

== Personal life ==
In 1987, Turner married Lori Turner, a health executive. They have two daughters. After 25 years of marriage, they announced their separation in 2012 and divorced in 2013.

Turner married Majida Mourad on December 19, 2015, at Westminster Presbyterian Church in downtown Dayton. Representative Darrell Issa was a groomsman at the wedding. In May 2017, after less than two years of marriage, Turner filed for divorce, alleging that Mourad was "guilty of a fraudulent contract". As part of the acrimonious divorce, Turner's lawyers wrote to Issa "stating they would like to depose" him, but lawyers for both sides later released a statement that "Majida Mourad and Congressman Michael Turner have come to a resolution".

Political offices
Preceded by Clay Dixon	Mayor of Dayton; 1994–2002	Succeeded by Rhine McLin
U.S. House of Representatives
Preceded by Tony P. Hall	Member of the U.S. House of Representatives from Ohio's 3rd congressional district 2003–2013	Succeeded by Joyce Beatty
Preceded by Dennis Kucinich	Member of the U.S. House of Representatives from Ohio's 10th congressional district 2013–present	Incumbent
Preceded by Devin Nunes	Ranking Member of the House Intelligence Committee; 2022–2023	Succeeded by Jim Himes
Preceded by Adam Schiff	Chair of the House Intelligence Committee; 2023–2025	Succeeded by Rick Crawford
Diplomatic posts
Preceded by Hugh Bayley	President of the NATO Parliamentary Assembly; 2014–2016	Succeeded by Paolo Alli
U.S. order of precedence (ceremonial)
Preceded by Linda Sánchez	United States representatives by seniority 42nd	Succeeded by Mike Rogers
Preceded by Joe Wilson	Order of precedence of the United States	Succeeded by Mike Rogers
