= Rhine McLin =

American politician (born 1948)

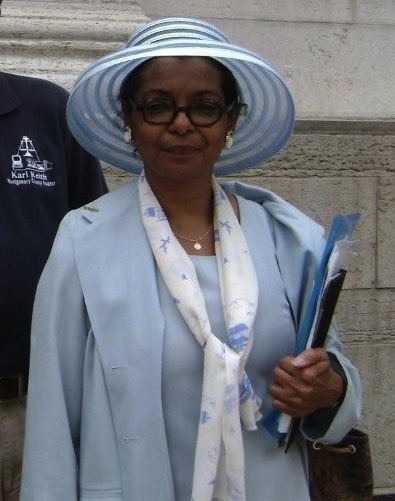
- McLin in 2008

54th Mayor of Dayton
- In office January 4, 2002 – January 4, 2010
- Preceded by: Mike Turner
- Succeeded by: Gary Leitzell

Member of the Ohio Senate from the 5th district
- In office January 3, 1995 – December 5, 2001
- Preceded by: Neal Zimmers
- Succeeded by: Tom Roberts

Member of the Ohio House of Representatives from the 38th district
- In office January 3, 1989 – December 31, 1994
- Preceded by: C.J. McLin
- Succeeded by: Lloyd Lewis Jr.

Personal details
- Born: 1948 (age 77–78)
- Party: Democratic
- Relations: C. J. McLin (father)
- Education: Parsons College (BA); Xavier University (MEd); Cincinnati College of Mortuary Science (AS)

Rhine Lana McLin (born October 1948) is an American Democratic politician from Ohio who served as the 54th mayor of Dayton, Ohio, from 2002 to 2010. McLin previously served as a member of both chambers of the Ohio General Assembly.

== Education ==
McLin received her Bachelor of Arts degree in sociology and secondary education from Parsons College and her Master of Education in guidance counseling from Xavier University. She also holds an associate's degree in mortuary science granted by the Cincinnati College of Mortuary Science.

== Career ==
In 1988, when McLin's father, C. J. McLin, died, Rhine was appointed to serve the remainder of his term in the Ohio House of Representatives. She was then elected to the seat in 1990, and re-elected in 1992. She then was elected to the Ohio Senate in 1994, and re-elected to the senate in 1998. In 2001, McLin was named Minority Leader (completing the term of Ohio senator Ben Espy). She served as Minority Leader until she left the Senate in 2002, barred by term limits from running for re-election again that year. She ran for the office of mayor of Dayton.

McLin was elected mayor of Dayton in 2001, defeating incumbent Republican Michael R. Turner and began serving her term in 2002. She was re-elected in 2005, defeating opponent David R. Bohardt. McLin was an Ohio delegate to the 2000 Democratic National Convention. In 2009, she lost re-election for mayor.

In 1994, McLin became the first African American woman elected to the Ohio State Senate. She was the first African American woman to serve as Ohio Senate minority leader. Upon leaving the Senate, she became the first woman to serve as mayor of Dayton. She is the third African American mayor of Dayton. Finally, in late 2005 she was the first African American woman to serve as head of the Ohio Democratic Party.

Since 2012, McLin has served as the Vice Chairwoman of the Ohio Democratic Party. In August 2012, McLin was mentioned as a possible candidate to fill the Ohio state representative seat vacated by Clayton Luckie, but she ultimately declined to run.

McLin created and hosts the Youtube channel of The Funk Music Hall of Fame & Exhibition Center which honors and presents interviews and other information on 70s and 80s funk musicians.

Political offices
Preceded by Mike Turner	Mayor of Dayton, Ohio; 2002–2009	Succeeded by Gary Leitzell
