= 2021 Dayton mayoral election =

- November 2, 2021
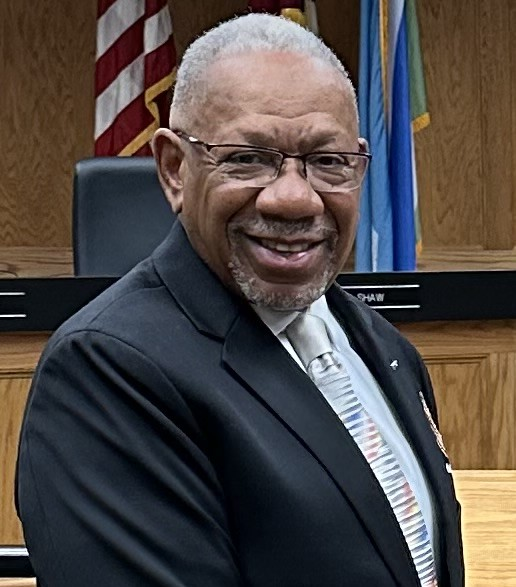

Candidate	Jeff Mims	Rennes Bowers
Party	Nonpartisan	Nonpartisan
Popular vote	10,290	5,056
Percentage	67.05%	32.95%
Mayor before election
Nan Whaley
Nonpartisan
Elected mayor
Jeff Mims
Nonpartisan

The 2021 Dayton mayoral election took place on November 8, 2021. Incumbent Mayor Nan Whaley declined to seek re-election to a third term, instead opting to unsuccessfully run for Governor in 2022. Three candidates ran to succeed her: City Commissioner Jeff Mims, retired firefighter Rennes Bowers, and former Mayor Gary Leitzell.

In the primary election, Mims placed first by a wide margin, winning 58 percent of the vote to Bowers's 26 percent and Leitzell's 16 percent. Mims and Bowers advanced to the general election, where Mims won in a landslide, receiving 67 percent of the vote.

== Primary election ==
=== Candidates ===
- Jeff Mims, City Commissioner
- Rennes Bowers, retired city firefighter
- Gary Leitzell, former Mayor

=== Results ===
Primary election results
Candidate	Votes	%
Jeff Mims	4,914	58.43%
Rennes Bowers	2,158	25.66%
Gary Leitzell	1,338	15.91%
Total votes	8,410	100.00%

== General election ==
=== Results ===
2021 Dayton mayoral election results
Candidate	Votes	%
Jeff Mims	10,290	67.05%
Rennes Bowers	5,056	32.95%
Total votes	15,346	100.00%
