= 2013 Dayton mayoral election =

- November 8, 2013
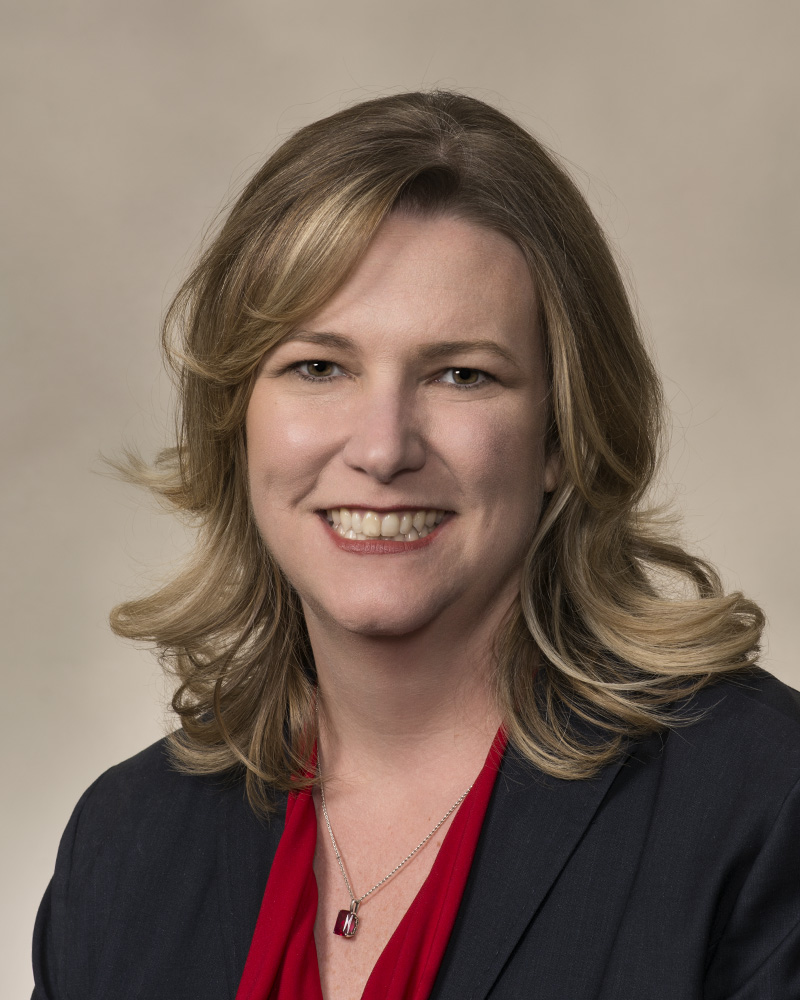

| Candidate | Nan Whaley | A.J. Wagner |
| Party | Nonpartisan | Nonpartisan |
| Popular vote | 9,211 | 7,123 |
| Percentage | 56.39% | 43.61% |
Mayor before election
Gary Leitzell
Nonpartisan
Elected mayor
Nan Whaley
Nonpartisan

The 2013 Dayton mayoral election took place on November 8, 2013. Incumbent Mayor Gary Leitzell ran for re-election to a second term. Leitzell was challenged by City Commissioner Nan Whaley and former Common Pleas Court Judge A.J. Wagner. Whaley emerged as a frontrunner in the race, earning the endorsement of the Montgomery County Democratic Party and significantly outraising both Leitzell and Wagner.

In the primary election, Whaley placed first, winning 50 percent of the vote, while Wagner placed second with 26 percent and Leitzell placed third, the first time in decades that a sitting mayor was defeated in the primary election.

Though both Whaley and Wagner were Democrats, the general election divided along partisan lines, with local Republicans, including Congressman Mike Turner, supporting Wagner while the state's only statewide Democrat, Senator Sherrod Brown, endorsed Whaley. Whaley raised three times as much as Wagner in the general election, which was the second-costliest mayoral race in city history.

Whaley ultimately defeated Wagner by a wide margin, winning 56 percent of the vote to his 44 percent.

== Primary election ==
=== Candidates ===
- Nan Whaley, City Commissioner
- A.J. Wagner, former Montgomery County Common Pleas Judge, former County Auditor
- Gary Leitzell, incumbent Mayor

=== Results ===
Primary election results
| Party | Candidate | Votes | % |
|---|---|---|---|
| Nonpartisan | Nan Whaley | 5,027 | 50.35% |
| Nonpartisan | A. J. Wagner | 2,595 | 25.99% |
| Nonpartisan | Gary Leitzell (inc.) | 2,363 | 23.67% |
| Total votes | | 9,985 | 100.00% |

== General election ==
=== Results ===
2013 Dayton mayoral election results
| Party | Candidate | Votes | % |
|---|---|---|---|
| Nonpartisan | Nan Whaley | 9,211 | 56.39% |
| Nonpartisan | A. J. Wagner | 7,123 | 43.61% |
| Total votes | | 16,334 | 100.00% |
