= 54th NAACP Image Awards =

American entertainment awards for 2022 works

- Date: February 25, 2023
- Site: Pasadena Civic Auditorium, Pasadena, California
- Hosted by: Queen Latifah
- Official website: NAACPImageAwards.net

Television coverage
- Network: BET; BET Her; CBS; CMT; Comedy Central; Logo; MTV; MTV2; Paramount Network; Pop; Pluto TV; Smithsonian Channel; TV Land; VH1 (simulcast)

The 54th NAACP Image Awards, presented by the NAACP, honored outstanding representations and achievements of people of color in motion pictures, television, music, and literature during the 2022 calendar year. The ceremony was hosted by Queen Latifah and aired on February 25, 2023, on BET and simulcast on several of its sister Paramount Global Networks along with Paramount+. Presentations of untelevised categories was livestreamed from February 20 to February 24, 2023, on the ceremony's website.

The nominations were announced on January 12, 2023, with the film Black Panther: Wakanda Forever leading the nominations with twelve nods, followed by the television sitcom Abbott Elementary which led the television categories with nine nominations. In the recording categories, Beyoncé and Kendrick Lamar lead the nominations with five each. For the first time in the history of the awards ceremony, three categories were added to reward Outstanding Hairstyling, Outstanding Make-Up and Outstanding Costume Design in film and television.

All nominees are listed below, and the winners are listed in bold.

== Special awards ==
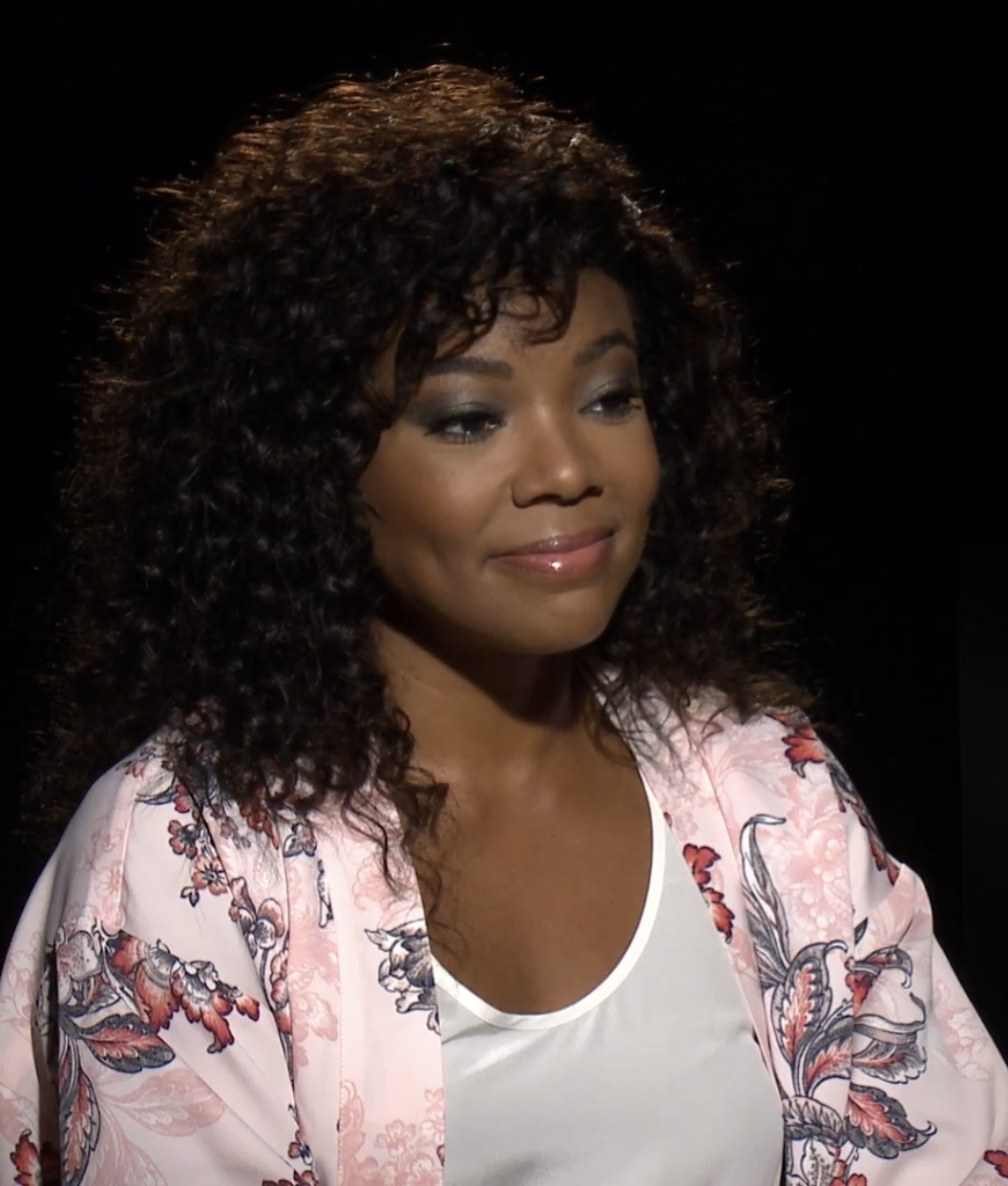
Gabrielle Union was honored with the President's Award.

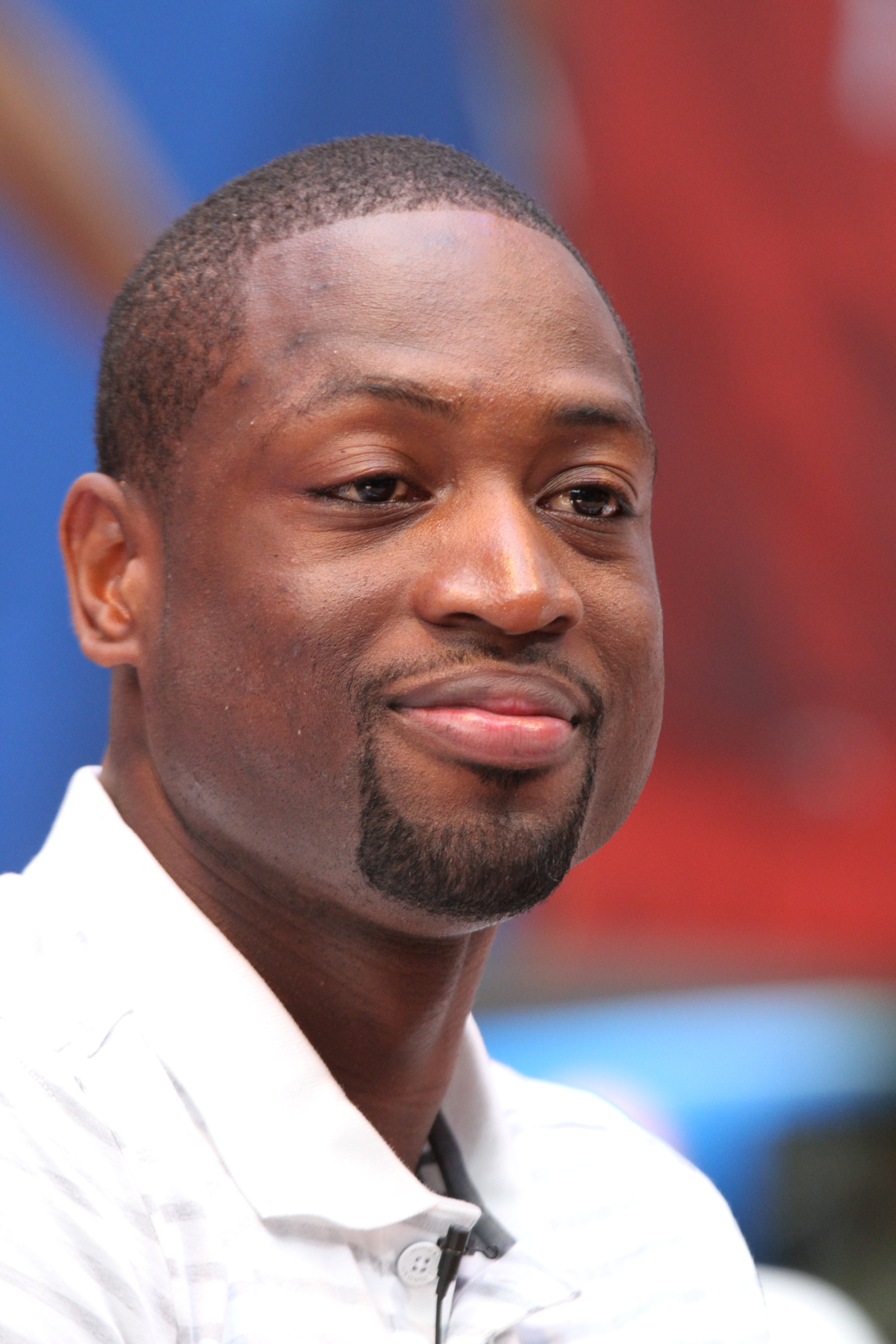
Dwyane Wade was honored with the President's Award.

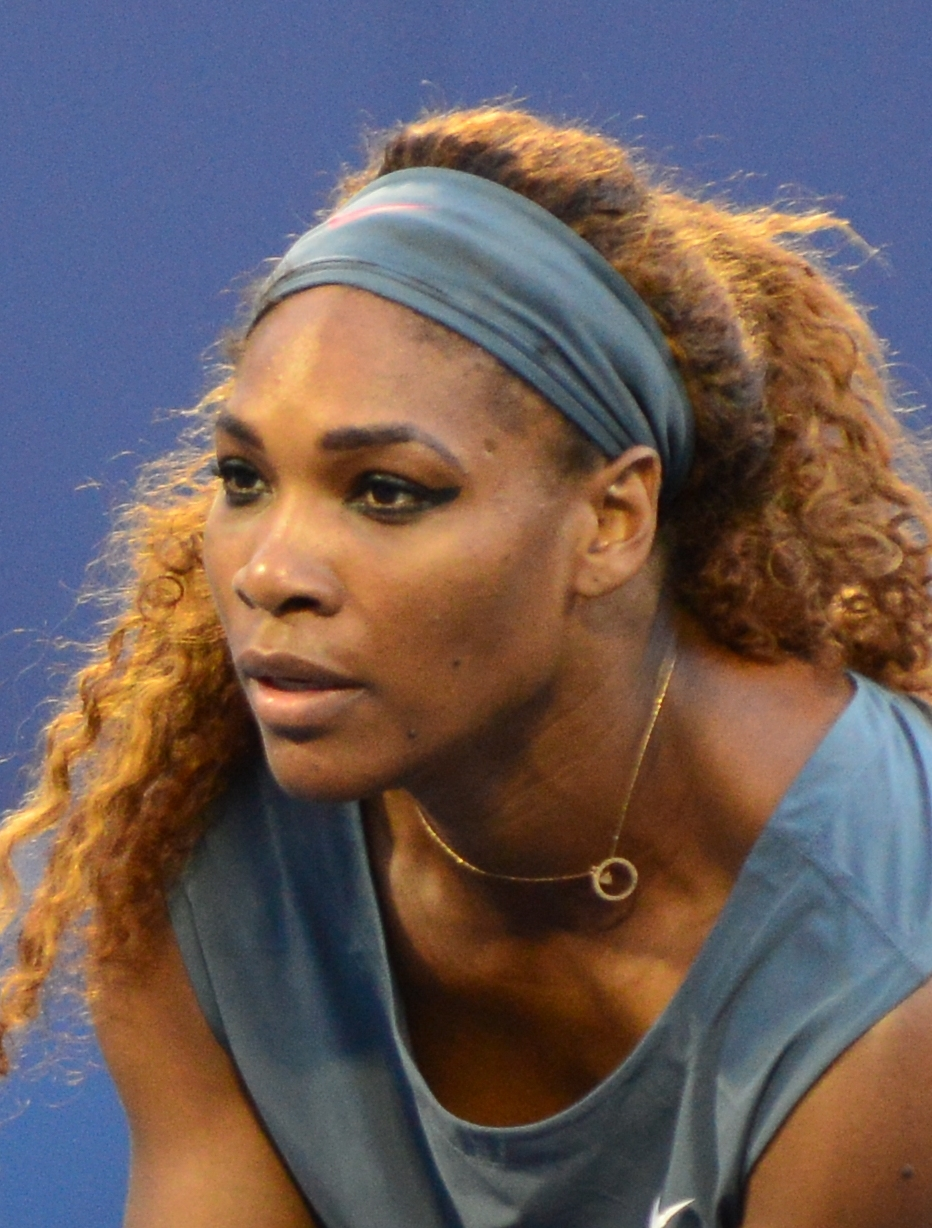
Serena Williams was the 10th person to be honored with the NAACP Jackie Robinson Sports Award.

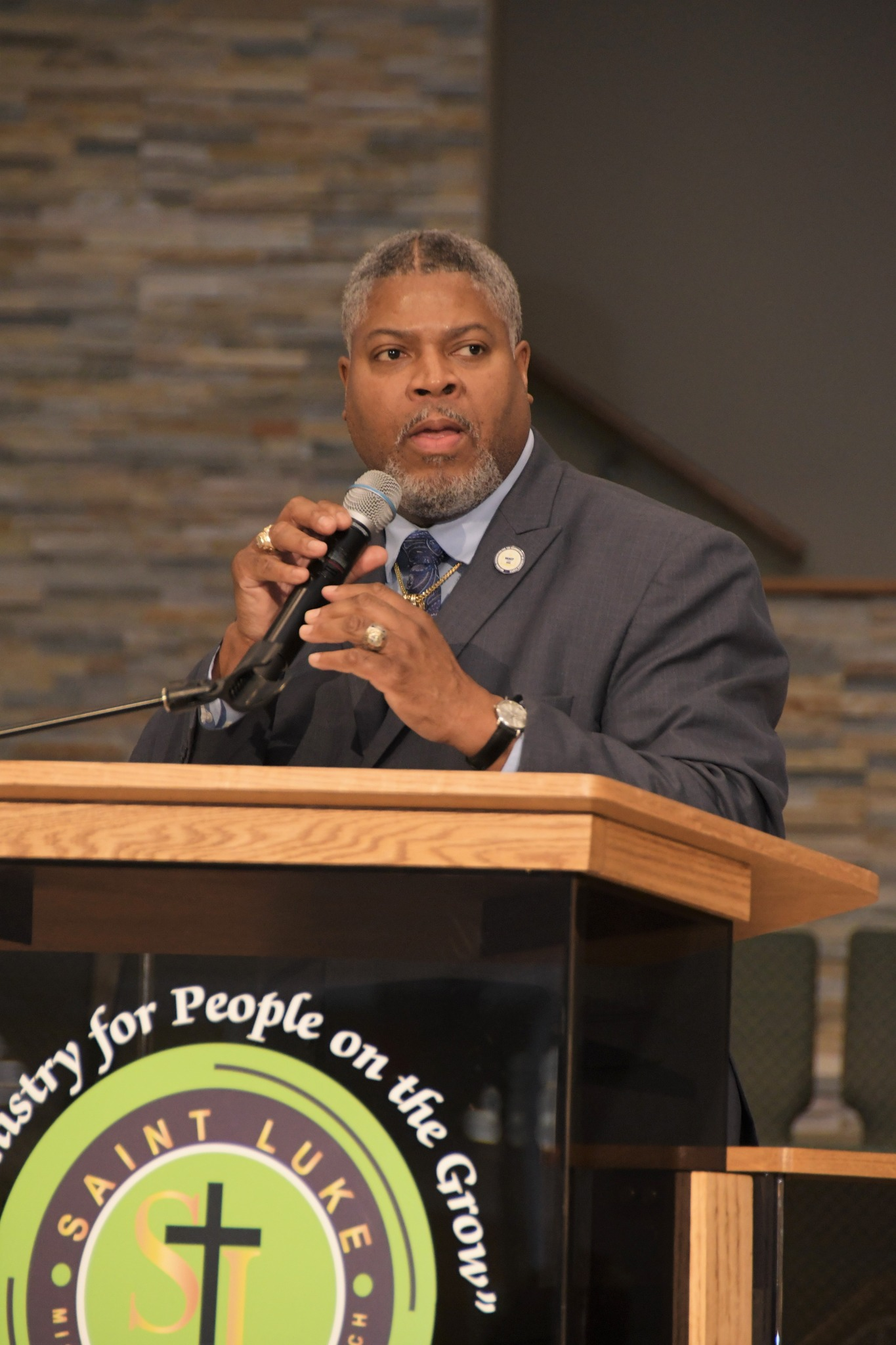
Derrick L. Foward was the 4th person to be honored with the NAACP Image Award for Activist of the Year.

President's Award
- **Gabrielle Union**
- **Dwyane Wade**
Chairman's Award
- **Congressman Bennie G. Thompson**
Vanguard Award
- **Bethann Hardison**
Entertainer of the Year
- **Angela Bassett**
  - Mary J. Blige
  - Quinta Brunson
  - Viola Davis
  - Zendaya
Social Justice Impact Award
- **Benjamin Crump**
Jackie Robinson Sports Award
- **Serena Williams**
Activist of the Year
- **Dr. Derrick L. Foward**
Youth Activist of the Year
- **Bradley Ross Jackson**
NAACP-Archewell Digital Civil Rights Award
- **Nabiha Syed**

== Motion Picture ==
Outstanding Motion Picture	Outstanding Directing in a Motion Picture
**Black Panther: Wakanda Forever**; A Jazzman's Blues; Emancipation; The Woman King; Till	**Gina Prince-Bythewood – The Woman King**; Antoine Fuqua – Emancipation; Chinonye Chukwu – Till; Kasi Lemmons – Whitney Houston: I Wanna Dance with Somebody; Ryan Coogler – Black Panther: Wakanda Forever
Outstanding Actor in a Motion Picture	Outstanding Actress in a Motion Picture
**Will Smith – Emancipation**; Daniel Kaluuya – Nope; Jonathan Majors – Devotion; Joshua Boone – A Jazzman's Blues; Sterling K. Brown – Honk for Jesus. Save Your Soul.	**Viola Davis – The Woman King**; Danielle Deadwyler – Till; Keke Palmer – Alice; Letitia Wright – Black Panther: Wakanda Forever; Regina Hall – Honk for Jesus. Save Your Soul
Outstanding Supporting Actor in a Motion Picture	Outstanding Supporting Actress in a Motion Picture
**Tenoch Huerta – Black Panther: Wakanda Forever**; Aldis Hodge – Black Adam; Cliff Smith – On the Come Up; Jalyn Hall – Till; John Boyega – The Woman King	**Angela Bassett – Black Panther: Wakanda Forever**; Danai Gurira – Black Panther: Wakanda Forever; Janelle Monáe – Glass Onion: A Knives Out Mystery; Lashana Lynch – The Woman King; Lupita Nyong'o – Black Panther: Wakanda Forever
Outstanding International Motion Picture	Outstanding Independent Motion Picture
**Bantú Mama**; Athena; Broker; Learn to Swim; The Silent Twins	**The Inspection**; Breaking; Causeway; Mr. Malcolm's List; Remember Me: The Mahalia Jackson Story
Outstanding Breakthrough Performance in a Motion Picture	Outstanding Ensemble Cast in a Motion Picture
**Jalyn Hall – Till**; Joshua Boone – A Jazzman's Blues; Ledisi – Remember Me: The Mahalia Jackson Story; Y'lan Noel – A Lot of Nothing; Yola – Elvis	**Black Panther: Wakanda Forever**; A Jazzman's Blues; Emancipation; The Woman King; Till
Outstanding Animated Motion Picture	Outstanding Character Voice Performance – Motion Picture
**Wendell & Wild**; DC League of Super-Pets; Guillermo del Toro's Pinocchio; Puss in Boots: The Last Wish; Turning Red	**Keke Palmer – Lightyear**; Angela Bassett – Wendell & Wild; Kevin Hart – DC League of Super-Pets; Lyric Ross – Wendell & Wild; Taraji P. Henson – Minions: The Rise of Gru
Outstanding Short Form (Live Action)	Outstanding Short Form (Animated)
**Dear Mama...**; Fannie; Fathead; Incomplete; Pens & Pencils	**More Than I Want To Remember**; I Knew Superman; Supercilious; The Boy, the Mole, the Fox and the Horse; We Are Here
Outstanding Breakthrough Creative (Motion Picture)	Outstanding Writing in a Motion Picture
**Ericka Nicole Malone – Remember Me: The Mahalia Jackson Story**; Elvis Mitchell – Is That Black Enough For You?!?; Krystin Ver Linden – Alice; Mo McRae – A Lot of Nothinh; Stephen Adetumbi, Jarrett Roseborough – This Is My Black	**Ryan Coogler – Black Panther: Wakanda Forever**; Charles Murray – The Devil You Know; Dana Stevens, Maria Bello – The Woman King; Jordan Peele – Nope; Krystin Ver Linden – Alice

== Television ==
=== Drama ===
Outstanding Drama Series
**P-Valley (Starz)**; Bel-Air (Peacock); Bridgerton (Netflix); Euphoria (HBO); Queen Sugar (OWN)
Outstanding Actor in a Drama Series	Outstanding Actress in a Drama Series
**Nicco Annan – P-Valley (Starz)**; Damson Idris – Snowfall (FX); Jabari Banks – Bel-Air (Peacock); Kofi Siriboe – Queen Sugar (OWN); Sterling K. Brown – This Is Us (NBC)	**Angela Bassett – 9-1-1 (Fox)**; Brandee Evans – P-Valley (Starz); Queen Latifah – The Equalizer (CBS); Rutina Wesley – Queen Sugar (OWN); Zendaya – Euphoria (HBO)
Outstanding Supporting Actor in a Drama Series	Outstanding Supporting Actress in a Drama Series
**Cliff Smith – Power Book II: Ghost (Starz)**; Adrian Holmes – Bel-Air (Peacock); Amin Joseph – Snowfall (FX); Caleb McLaughlin – Stranger Things (Netflix); J. Alphonse Nicholson – P-Valley (Starz)	**Loretta Devine – P-Valley (Starz)**; Adjoa Andoh – Bridgerton (Netflix); Bianca Lawson – Queen Sugar (OWN); Susan Kelechi Watson – This Is Us (NBC); Tina Lifford – Queen Sugar (OWN)
Outstanding Directing in a Drama Series	Outstanding Writing in a Dramatic Series
**Giancarlo Esposito – Better Call Saul – "Axe and Grind" (AMC)**; Debbie Allen – The Last Days of Ptolemy Grey – "Robyn" (Apple TV+); Gina Prince-Bythewood – Women of the Movement – "Mother and Son" (ABC); Hanelle Culpepper – The Last Days of Ptolemy Grey – "Sensia" (Apple TV+); Kasi Lemmons – Women of the Movement – "The Last Word" (ABC)	**Marissa Jo Cerar – Women of the Movement – "Mother and Son" (ABC)**; Aurin Squire – The Good Fight – "The End of Football" (Paramount+); Branden Jacobs-Jenkins – Kindred – "Dana" (Hulu); Davita Scarlett – The Good Fight – "The End of Eli Gold" (Paramount+); Joshua Allen – From Scratch – "Bread and Brine" (Netflix)

=== Comedy ===
Outstanding Comedy Series
**Abbott Elementary (ABC)**; Atlanta (FX); Black-ish (ABC); Rap Sh!t (HBO Max); The Wonder Years (ABC)
Outstanding Actor in a Comedy Series	Outstanding Actress in a Comedy Series
**Cedric the Entertainer – The Neighborhood (CBS)**; Anthony Anderson – Black-ish (ABC); Donald Glover – Atlanta (FX); Dulé Hill – The Wonder Years (ABC); Mike Epps – The Upshaws (Netflix)	**Quinta Brunson – Abbott Elementary (ABC)**; Loretta Devine – Family Reunion (Netflix); Maya Rudolph – Loot (Apple TV+); Tichina Arnold – The Neighborhood (CBS); Tracee Ellis Ross – black-ish (ABC)
Outstanding Supporting Actor in a Comedy Series	Outstanding Supporting Actress in a Comedy Series
**Tyler James Williams – Abbott Elementary (ABC)**; Brian Tyree Henry – Atlanta (FX); Deon Cole – black-ish (ABC); Kenan Thompson – Saturday Night Live (NBC); William Stanford Davis – Abbott Elementary (ABC)	**Janelle James – Abbott Elementary (ABC)**; Jenifer Lewis – black-ish (ABC); Marsai Martin – black-ish (ABC); Sheryl Lee Ralph – Abbott Elementary (ABC); Wanda Sykes – The Upshaws (Netflix)
Outstanding Directing in a Comedy Series	Outstanding Writing in a Comedy Series
**Angela Barnes – Atlanta – "The Homeliest Little Horse" (FX)**; Bridget Stokes – A Black Lady Sketch Show – "Save My Edges, I'm a Donor!" (HBO Max); Dee Rees – Upload – "Hamood!" (Amazon Prime Video); Iona Morris Jackson – black-ish – "If a Black Man Cries in the Woods" (ABC); Pete Chatmon – The Flight Attendant – "Drowning Women" (HBO Max)	**Brittani Nichols – Abbott Elementary – "Student Transfer" (ABC)**; Aisha Muharrar – Hacks – "The Click" (HBO Max); Ayo Edebiri, Shana Gohd – What We Do in the Shadows – "Private School" (FX); Karen Joseph Adcock – The Bear – "Sheridan" (Hulu); Quinta Brunson – Abbott Elementary – "Development Day" (ABC)

=== Television Movie, Limited-Series or Dramatic Special ===
Outstanding Television Movie, Mini-Series or Dramatic Special
**The Best Man: The Final Chapters**; Carl Weber's The Black Hamptons; From Scratch; The Last Days of Ptolemy Grey; Women of the Movement
Outstanding Actor in a Television Movie, Mini-Series or Dramatic Special	Outstanding Actress in a Television Movie, Mini-Series or Dramatic Special
**Morris Chestnut – The Best Man: The Final Chapters**; Samuel L. Jackson – The Last Days of Ptolemy Grey; Terrence Howard – The Best Man: The Final Chapters; Trevante Rhodes – Mike; Wendell Pierce – Don't Hang Up	**Niecy Nash – Dahmer – Monster: The Jeffrey Dahmer Story**; Regina Hall – The Best Man: The Final Chapters; Sanaa Lathan – The Best Man: The Final Chapters; Viola Davis – The First Lady; Zoe Saldaña – From Scratch
Outstanding Supporting Actor in a Television Movie, Limited-Series or Dramatic Special	Outstanding Supporting Actress in a Television Movie, Limited-Series or Dramatic Special
**Keith David – From Scratch**; Glynn Turman – Women of the Movement; Omar Benson Miller – The Last Days of Ptolemy Grey; Russell Hornsby – Mike; Terrence C. Carson – A Wesley Christmas	**Nia Long – The Best Man: The Final Chapters**; Alexis Floyd – Inventing Anna; Danielle Deadwyler – From Scratch; Melissa De Sousa – The Best Man: The Final Chapters; Phylicia Rashad – Little America
Outstanding Directing in a Television Movie or Special	Outstanding Writing in a Television Movie or Special
**Anton Cropper – Fantasy Football**; Marta Cunningham – 61st Street; Sujata Day – Definition Please; Tailiah Breon – Kirk Franklin's The Night Before Christmas; Tine Fields – Soul of a Nation: Screen Queens Rising	**Ian Edelman, Maurice Williams – Entergalactic**; Bree West – A Wesley Christmas; Jerrod Carmichael – Jerrod Carmichael: Rothaniel; Lil Rel Howery – Lil Rel Howery: I said it. Y'all Thinking it; Matt Lopez – Father of the Bride

=== Reality and Variety ===
Outstanding Talk Series	Outstanding Reality Program, Reality Competition Series or Game Show
**Sherri**; Hart to Heart; Red Table Talk; Tamron Hall; Uninterrupted: The Shop	**Lizzo's Watch Out for the Big Grrrls**; Legendary; Shark Tank; Sweet Life: Los Angeles; The Real Housewives of Atlanta
Outstanding News / Information – (Series or Special)	Outstanding Host in a Talk or News / Information (Series or Special)
**ABC News 20/20 Michelle Obama: The Light We Carry, A Conversation with Robin Roberts**; #RolandMartinUnfiltered: Black Votes Matter Election Night 2022 Coverage; Finding Your Roots with Henry Louis Gates, Jr.; OWN Spotlight: Viola Davis - The Woman King; The Hair Tales	**Jennifer Hudson – The Jennifer Hudson Show**; Jada Pinkett Smith, Adrienne Banfield-Norris, Willow Smith – Red Table Talk; Kevin Hart – Hart to Heart; Lester Holt – NBC Nightly News; Tracee Ellis Ross – The Hair Tales
Outstanding Variety Show (Series or Special)	Outstanding Host in a Reality, Game Show or Variety (Series or Special)
**The Daily Show with Trevor Noah**; A Black Lady Sketch Show; BET Awards 2022; Deon Cole: Charleen's Boy; Martin: The Reunion	**Tabitha Brown – Tab Time**; Keke Palmer – Password; Lizzo – Lizzo's Watch Out for the Big Grrrls; Taraji P. Henson – BET Awards 2022; Trevor Noah – The Daily Show with Trevor Noah

=== Other Categories ===
Outstanding Short-Form Series (Drama or Comedy)	Outstanding Short-Form Series - Reality/Nonfiction
**Between The Scenes – The Daily Show**; Oh Hell No! With Marlon Wayans; Rise Up, Sing Out; Sunday Dinner; Zootopia+	**Daring Simone Biles**; Black Independent Films: A Brief History; Historian's Take; NFL 360; Omitted: The Black Cowboy
Outstanding Animated Series	Outstanding Children's Program
**The Proud Family: Louder and Prouder**; Central Park; Eureka!; Gracie's Corner; Zootopia+	**Tab Time**; Family Reunion; Raising Dion; Raven's Home; Waffles + Mochi's Restaurant
Outstanding Breakthrough Creative (Television)
**Quinta Brunson – Abbott Elementary**; Amy Yang – From Scratch; Branden Jacobs-Jenkins – Kindred; Hannah Cope – Karma's World; Syreeta Singleton – Rap Sh!t

=== Overall Acting ===
Outstanding Character Voice-Over Performance (Television)	Outstanding Guest Actor or Actress in a Television Series
**Kyla Pratt – The Proud Family: Louder and Prouder**; Billy Porter – The Proud Family: Louder and Prouder; Cedric the Entertainer – The Proud Family: Louder and Prouder; Chris Bridges – Karma's World; Cree Summer – Rugrats	**Glynn Turman – Queen Sugar**; Amanda Gorman – Sesame Street; Chance the Rapper – South Side; Colman Domingo – Euphoria; Gabourey Sidibe – American Horror Stories
Outstanding Performance by a Youth (Series, Special, Television Movie or Limited-series)
**Ja'Siah Young – Raising Dion**; Alaya High – That Girl Lay Lay; Cameron J. Wright – Family Reunion; Elisha Williams – The Wonder Years; Khali Spraggins – The Upshaws

== Documentary ==
Outstanding Documentary (Film)	Outstanding Documentary (Television)
**Civil**; Descendant; Is That Black Enough for You?!?; Louis Armstrong's Black & Blues; Sidney	**Everything's Gonna Be All White**; Black Love; Police On Trial - Credited to Frontline and Star Tribune; Race: Bubba Wallace; Shaq
Outstanding Directing in a Documentary
**Reginald Hudlin – Sidney**; Nadia Hallgren – Civil; Sacha Jenkins – Everything's Gonna Be All White; Sacha Jenkins – Louis Armstrong's Black & Blues; W. Kamau Bell – We Need to Talk About Cosby

== Costume Design, Make-up and Hairstyling ==
Outstanding Costume Design	Outstanding Make-up
**Ruth E. Carter – Black Panther: Wakanda Forever**; Francine Jamison-Tanchuck – Emancipation; Gersha Phillips, Carly Nicodemo, Heather Constable, Christina Cattle, Sheryl Willock, Becky MacKinnon – Star Trek: Discovery; Gersha Phillips, Carly Nicodemo, Lieze Van Tonder, Lynn Paulsen, Tova Harrison – The Woman King; Trayce Gigi Field – A League of Their Own	**Debi Young, Sandra Linn, Ngozi Olandu Young, Gina Bateman – We Own This City**; Angie Wells – Cheaper by the Dozen; Michele Lewis – The Last Days of Ptolemy Grey; Ren Rohling, Teresa Vest, Megan Areford – Emergency; Zabrina Matiru – Surface
Outstanding Hairstyling
**Camille Friend – Black Panther: Wakanda Forever**; Curtis Foreman, Ryan Randall – RuPaul's Drag Race All Stars; Louisa V. Anthony, Deaundra Metzger, Maurice Beaman – Till; Mary Daniels, Kalin Spooner, Darrin Lyons, Eric Gonzalez – All American; Tracey Moss, Jerome Allen, Tamika Dixon, Lawrence "Jigga" Simmons, Jason Simmons – Fantasy Football

== Recording ==
Outstanding Album	Outstanding New Artist
**Renaissance – Beyoncé**; Age/Sex/Location – Ari Lennox; Breezy (Deluxe) –Chris Brown; Mr. Morale & the Big Steppers – Kendrick Lamar; Watch the Sun – PJ Morton	**Coco Jones**; Adam Blackstone; Armani White; Fivio Foreign; Steve Lacy
Outstanding Male Artist	Outstanding Female Artist
**Chris Brown**; Brent Faiyaz; Burna Boy; Drake; Kendrick Lamar	**Beyoncé**; Ari Lennox; Chlöe; Jazmine Sullivan; SZA
Outstanding Duo, Group or Collaboration (Traditional)	Outstanding Duo, Group or Collaboration (Contemporary)
**"Love's Train" – Silk Sonic**; "Die Hard"– Kendrick Lamar feat. Blxst & Amanda Reifer; "Good Morning Gorgeous" (Remix) – Mary J. Blige & H.E.R.; "Still Believe" – PJ Morton feat. Alex Isley and Jill Scott; "No Love" – Summer Walker, Cardi B and SZA	**"Call Me Every Day" – Chris Brown feat. Wizkid**; "Move" – Beyoncé feat. Grace Jones and Tems; "Good Love" – City Girls feat. Usher; "Wait for U" – Future, Drake & Tems; "Big Energy" – Latto feat. Mariah Carey and DJ Khaled
Outstanding Music Video/Visual Album	Outstanding Soundtrack/Compilation Album
**"Lift Me Up" – Rihanna**; "About Damn Time" – Lizzo; "Be Alive" – Beyoncé; "Lord Forgive Me" – EarthGang, Pharrell & Tobe Nwigwe; "The Heart Part 5" – Kendrick Lamar	**Black Panther: Wakanda Forever (Soundtrack) – Ryan Coogler, Ludwig Göransson, Archie Davis & Dave Jordan**; Bridgerton Season Two (Soundtrack from the Netflix Series) – Kris Bowers; Entergalactic – Kid Cudi; P-Valley: Season 2 (Music From the Original TV Series) – Various Artists; The Woman King (Soundtrack) – Terence Blanchard
Outstanding Gospel/Christian Album	Outstanding Gospel/Christian Song
**Kingdom Book One – Maverick City Music & Kirk Franklin**; All Things New – Tye Tribbett; Hymns – Tasha Cobbs Leonard; My Life – James Fortune; The Urban Hymnal – Tennessee State University	**"Positive" – Erica Campbell**; "All in Your Hands" – Marvin Sapp; "Fly (Y.M.M.F.)" – Tennessee State University; "Whole World In His Hands" – MAJOR.; "Your World" – Jonathan McReynolds
Outstanding Jazz Album – Instrumental	Outstanding Jazz Album – Vocal
**Henry Franklin: Jazz Is Dead 014 – Henry Franklin, Ali Shaheed Muhammad, Adrian Younge**; Detour – Boney James; The Funk Will Prevail – Kaelin Ellis; The Gospel According to Nikki Giovanni – Javon Jackson; Thrill Ride – Ragan Whiteside	**Legacy – Adam Blackstone**; Linger Awhile – Samara Joy; Love and the Catalyst – Aimée Allen; New Standards Vol. 1 – Terri Lyne Carrington; The Evening: Live at Apparatus – The Baylor Project
Outstanding Soul/R&B Song	Outstanding Hip Hop/Rap Song
**"Cuff It" – Beyoncé**; "About Damn Time" – Lizzo; "Good Morning Gorgeous" (Remix) – Mary J. Blige & H.E.R.; "Hurt Me So Good" – Jazmine Sullivan; "Lift Me Up" – Rihanna	**"Hotel Lobby" – Quavo & Takeoff**; "Billie Eilish" – Armani White; "City of Gods" – Fivio Foreign, Kanye West & Alicia Keys; "The Heart Part 5" – Kendrick Lamar; "Wait for U" – Future, Drake & Tems
Outstanding International Song
**"No Woman No Cry" – Tems**; "Bad to Me" – Wizkid; "Diana" – Fireboy DML, Chris Brown & Shenseea; "Last Last" – Burna Boy; "Stand Strong" – Davido feat. Sunday Service Choir

== Podcast and Social Media ==
Outstanding News and Information Podcast	Outstanding Lifestyle/Self-Help Podcast
**Beyond the Scenes – The Daily Show**; SundayCivics; Black Tech Green Money; Holding Court with Eboni K. Williams; Into America with Trymaine Lee	**Therapy for Black Girls**; Chile, Please; GoOD Mornings with CurlyNikki; Man to Man: A Black Love Wellness Series; Maejor Frequency
Outstanding Society and Culture Podcast	Outstanding Arts and Entertainment Podcast
**LeVar Burton Read**; Comeback with Erica Cobb; Higher Learning with Van Lathan and Rachel Lindsay; Into America with Trymaine Lee; The Sum of Us	**Two Funny Mamas**; Angie Martinez IRL; Black Girl Songbook; Jemele Hill is Unbothered; The Read
Social Media Personality of the Year
**Kevin Fredericks**; George Lee; Christianee Porter; Troy Millings & Rashad Bilal; Lynae Vanee

== Literary ==
Outstanding Literary Work – Fiction	Outstanding Literary Work – Nonfiction
**Take My Hand – Dolen Perkins-Valdez**; Africa Risen: A New Era of Speculative Fiction – Sheree Renée Thomas, Zelda Knight, Oghenechovwe Donald Ekpeki; Light Skin Gone to Waste – Toni Ann Johnson; The Keeper – Tananarive Due, Steven Barnes; You Made a Fool of Death with Your Beauty – Akwaeke Emezi	**Finding Me – Viola Davis**; Grace: President Obama and Ten Days in the Battle for America – Cody Keenan; Requiem for the Massacre – RJ Young; Under the Skin – Linda Villarosa; Who’s Black and Why? A Hidden Chapter from the Eighteenth-Century Invention of Race – Henry Louis Gates, Andrew S. Curran
Outstanding Literary Work – Debut Author	Outstanding Literary Work – Biography/Autobiography
**Illustrated Black History: Honoring the Iconic and the Unseen – George McCalman**; America Made Me a Black Man – Boyah Farah; Marriage Be Hard – Kevin Fredericks, Melissa Fredericks; Truth’s Table: Black Women’s Musings on Life, Love, and Liberation – Ekemini Uwan, Christina Edmondson, Michelle Higgins; What the Fireflies Knew – Kai Harris	**Scenes from My Life – Michael K. Williams**; A Way Out of No Way: A Memoir of Truth, Transformation, and the New American Story – Raphael G. Warnock; The Light We Carry – Michelle Obama; Walking In My Joy: In These Streets – Jenifer Lewis; You’ve Been Chosen – Cynt Marshall
Outstanding Literary Work – Instructional	Outstanding Literary Work – Poetry
**Black Joy: Stories of Resistance, Resilience, and Restoration – Tracey Lewis-Giggetts**; Cooking from the Spirit – Tabitha Brown; Eat Plants, B*tch: 91 Vegan Recipes That Will Blow Your Meat-Loving Mind – Pinky Cole; Homecoming: Overcome Fear and Trauma to Reclaim Your Whole Authentic Self – Thema Bryant; The Five Principles: A Revolutionary Path to Health, Inner Wealth, and Knowledge of Self – Khnum Ibomu	**To the Realization of Perfect Helplessness – Robin Coste Lewis**; Best Barbarian – Roger Reeves; Bluest Nude – Ama Codjoe; Concentrate – Courtney Faye Taylor; Muse Found in a Colonized Body – Yesenia Montilla
Outstanding Literary Work – Children	Outstanding Literary Work – Youth/Teens
**Stacey's Remarkable Books – Stacey Abrams, Kitt Thomas**; Ablaze with Color: A Story of Painter Alma Thomas – Jeanne Walker Harvey, Loveis Wise; Black Gold – Laura Obuobi, London Ladd; Blue: A History of the Color as Deep as the Sea and as Wide as the Sky – Nana Brew-Hammond, Daniel Minter; The Year We Learned to Fly – Jacqueline Woodson, Rafael Lopez	**Cookies & Milk – Shawn Amos**; Inheritance: A Visual Poem – Elizabeth Acevedo; Maybe An Artist, A Graphic Memoir – Liz Montague; Me and White Supremacy: Young Readers’ Edition – Layla F. Saad; Opening My Eyes Underwater: Essays on Hope, Humanity, and Our Hero Michelle Obama – Ashley Woodfolk
