= Derrick L. Foward =

American civil rights activist

Derrick Lee Foward
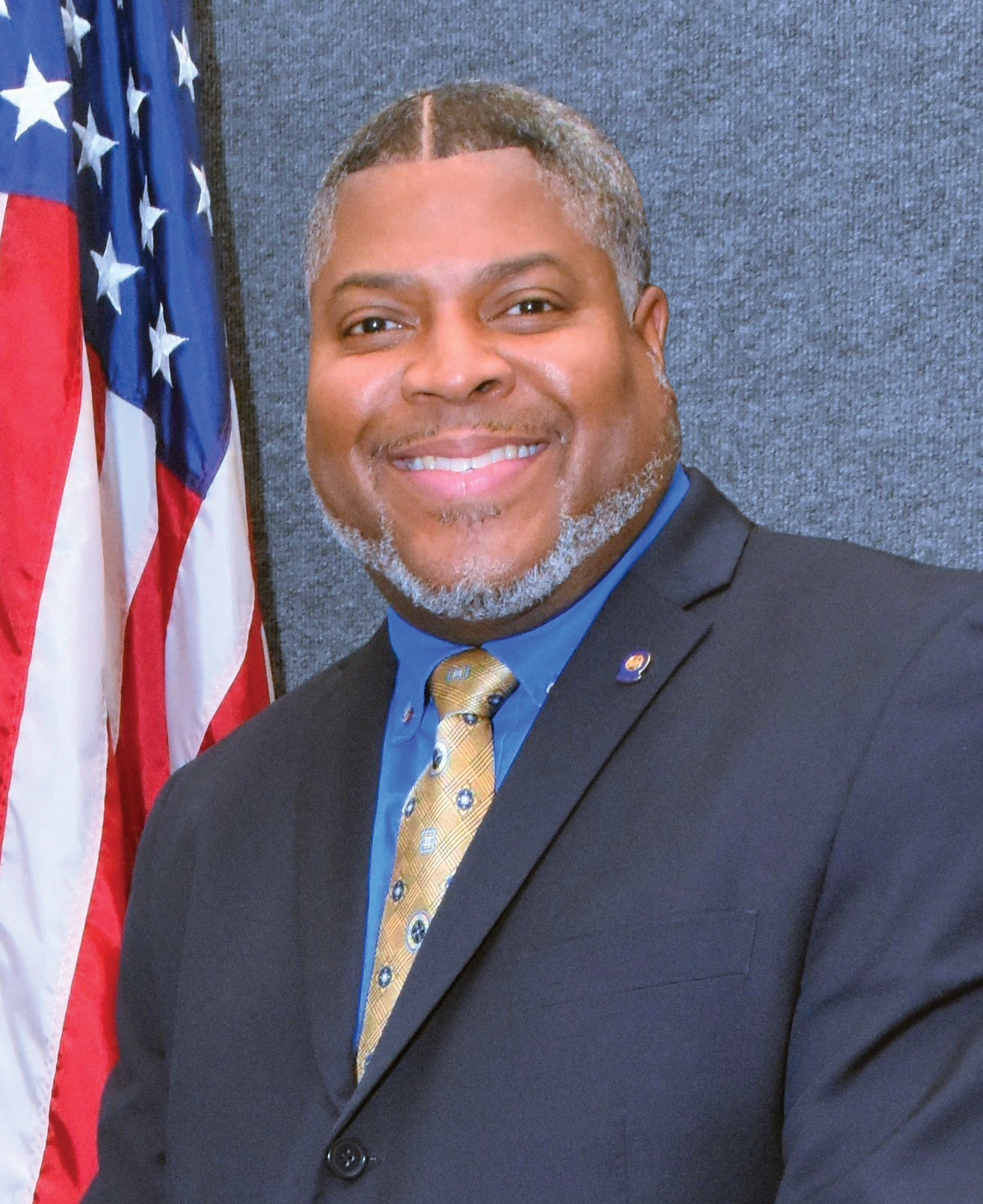

President of the Dayton NAACP
- Incumbent
- Assumed office January 1, 2007
- Preceded by: Rev. Dr. Robert E. Baines Jr.

Vice President of the Dayton NAACP
- In office January 1, 2005 – December 31, 2006
- President: Rev. Dr. Robert E. Baines Jr.
- Preceded by: Dr. Carl E. Moyler
- Succeeded by: Theodore C. Fields

3rd Vice President of the Dayton NAACP
- In office January 1, 2003 – December 31, 2004
- President: Floyd B. Johnson
- Preceded by: Audrey Douglas
- Succeeded by: Theodore C. Fields

Vice President of the Ohio NAACP
- Incumbent
- Assumed office September 11, 2021
- President: Tom Roberts (Ohio politician)
- Preceded by: Ophelia Averitt

2nd Vice President of the Ohio NAACP
- In office September 9, 2017 – September 11, 2021
- President: Tom Roberts (Ohio politician)
- Preceded by: Annette McCoy
- Succeeded by: Andre Washington

3rd Vice President of the Ohio NAACP
- In office September 12, 2009 – September 9, 2017
- President: Sybil Edwards-McNabb
- Preceded by: E. Jean Wrice
- Succeeded by: Denise Williams

Personal details
- Born: April 26, 1968 (age 58) Dayton, Ohio, U.S.
- Party: Democratic
- Spouses: Jean A. Howell (m. 1998; died 2019) Tiwona L. Branham (m. 2023)
- Children: 5
- Parents: Alphonsa Foward, Sr.; Gloria J. Foward
- Education: Central State University (BA); International Apostolic University of Grace and Truth (Master of Science in Administration and Organization)

Derrick Lee Foward (born April 26, 1968) is an American civil rights activist serving as the 34th president of the Dayton Branch of the National Association for the Advancement of Colored People (NAACP) since 2007. He has also served as vice president (2019–present); 2nd vice president (2017–2019); 3rd vice president (2009–2017); and Executive Committee Member (2003–2009) of the Ohio Conference NAACP. Foward also serves on the NAACP National Life Membership Committee and has served as the chair of the NAACP National Credentials Committee for many years. He won the NAACP Image Award for Activist of the Year in 2023.

== Early life and education ==
Foward was born in Kettering, Ohio, and, along with his brother and four sisters, were raised in the black middle-class community of Jefferson Township, Montgomery County, Ohio. His father served in the U.S. Navy and was honorably discharged after his tour of duty. His father then became a police officer in the community where his family lived and retired from the Defense Supply Center, Columbus (DESC) after nearly 40 years of federal service. His mother retired from Wright-Patterson Air Force Base (WPAFB) with over 34 years of federal service.

Foward graduated from Christ Temple Christian School as class valedictorian. He was the leader on the Christ Temple Warriors basketball team, averaging 34.7 points a game in his junior year. He had a severe speech impediment as a child and through young adulthood. Family members, friends and foes laughed and talked about how bad he stuttered which caused aggression and anger issues. The faith Foward embodied as a member of Christ Temple Apostolic Faith Church and the leadership roles he served in while at Speedway and the NAACP, assisted him with overcoming his disability.

He graduated from Central State University on June 17, 1990, and was inducted into the Central State University Alumni Achievement Hall of Fame on March 1, 2016.

Foward then received his Master's of Administration and Organization from International Apostolic University of Grace and Truth on July 13, 2002, and was awarded a Doctor of Humane Letters on September 30, 2018.

== Personal life ==
Foward was married to Jean Ann Foward for over 20 years until her death from cancer on April 11, 2019. They were together for over 30 years and have two sons, two daughters, three grandchildren and three godchildren.

Foward then married Tiwona L. Branham on June 17, 2023, four months after he proposed to her in Pasadena, California after he received the NAACP Image Award for Activist of the Year. Foward credits her with the renewal of his interest to move forward with the second chapter of his life. She brought to this union, one son.

== Professional career ==
Foward began his career with Emro Marketing Company, now 7-Eleven, Inc., on March 1, 1993. He retired with more than 28 years of service on October 15, 2021. Foward served as a Store Manager, District Manager, Associate Category Manager (Cigarettes), Food Service Sales Rep., Facility Income Sales Coordinator, Associate Category Manager (Services), Fleet Relations Rep., Account Management Rep. and retired as a Program Manager.

== Dayton City Commission ==
In 2003, Foward sought the endorsement of the Montgomery County Democratic Party for Dayton City Commissioner, but withdrew his name as a candidate after he did not receive the endorsement.

== Ohio House of Representatives ==
In February 2002, while State Rep. Dixie Allen was considering a run for the Ohio Senate, Foward petitioned to run for her 39th House District of Ohio seat. Former State Rep. Tom Roberts was chosen by the Ohio Senate Democratics to fill the unexpired term of Senator Rhine McLin, so Foward withdrew his name as a candidate in the May 2002 Primary after the Montgomery County Democratic Party endorsed Allen for the House Seat she currently held.

In September 2019, Foward petitioned to run for the 39th House District of Ohio. Current State Rep. Fred Strahorn said he would endorse Foward for his seat, however many well-known leaders of the Montgomery County Democratic Party got behind Willis Blackshear Jr., as his father, the late Willis E. Blackshear Sr., a longtime Montgomery County Recorder, had recently died from cancer.

In October 2023, Foward petitioned to run for the 38th House District of Ohio. This seat is currently held by Rep. Willis Blackshear Jr., who is seeking the office of Ohio State Senator.

On January 6, 2024, Foward announced that he is seeking the Office of State Representative for the 38th House District of Ohio. In March, during the Ohio Primary Election, his opponent Desiree Tims won the election. He congratulated Tims on her successful campaign and advised that he would support her in the days ahead.

== Electoral history ==
Election results
Year	Office	Election	Votes for Foward	%	Opponent	Party	Votes	%
2024	Ohio House of Representatives	Primary	2,413	28.27%	Desiree Tims	Democratic	6,122	71.73%

== NAACP ==
In September 2008, Foward called upon the FBI to investigate a firebombing at the home of Saundra Ballard, a Black female residing in Jefferson Township, after the son of Earl McLearran set her house on fire while he was in jail on ethnic intimidation charges.

In March 2010, under the leadership of Foward, the Dayton Unit NAACP hosted a forum to educate parolees about how to access job opportunities, case management and drug rehab services. That same year, he led a group of Daytonians on a trip to Washington, D.C., to participate in the 10-2-10 March on Washington.

In 2011, Foward spoke out against subtle racism in the workplace and the lack of promotional opportunities made available to Black people. He said this type of racism contributes greatly to the wealth gap in America. That same year, Foward called upon the FBI to investigate the death of Kylen English, who allegedly broke out of a Dayton Police car window and jumped over a bridge to his death.

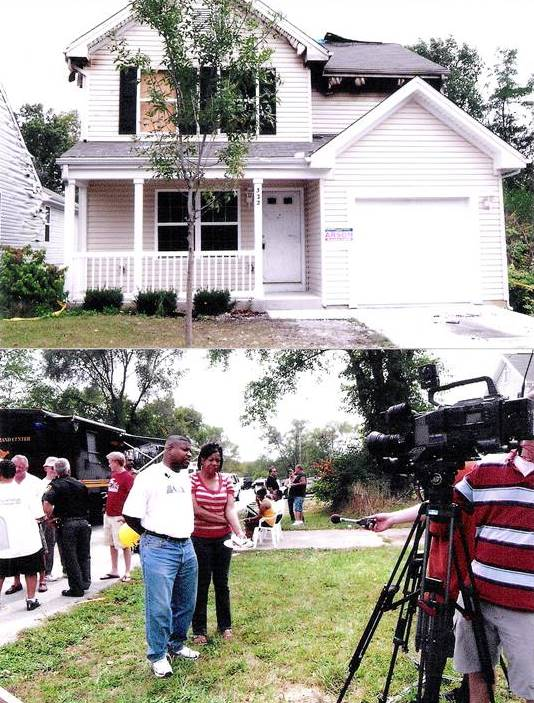
Foward press conference with Saundra Ballard

In July 2012, Joseph Ross filed a complaint with the Dayton Unit NAACP after being greeted at a Motel 6 in Sharonville, Ohio, with the words "Hello Nigger" on the screen of his TV in his room. Foward conducted a full and complete investigation into the case and was able to reach a settlement agreement with Motel 6 for an undisclosed amount.

In 2013, under the leadership Foward, the Dayton Unit NAACP led another group of Daytonians on a trip to Washington, D.C., to participate in the 50th Anniversary of the March on Washington.

In 2014, in his role as a State Officer of the Ohio Conference NAACP, Foward held an organizational meeting to start the process of reorganizing the Lima NAACP. On June 27, 2014, Foward applauded the action of the executive director of the Greater Dayton Regional Transit Authority to fire RTA bus driver Rickey Waggoner who lied about being shot by 3 black boys, and condemned the prosecutor's actions not to pursue charges. On September 24, 2014, Foward urged the U.S. Department of Justice (DOJ) and Ohio attorney general Mike DeWine to investigate the shooting death of John Crawford III at the hands of a Beavercreek Police Officer at the Walmart in Beavercreek, Ohio. Foward also met with U.S. Senator Sherrod Brown to seek his support.

In July 2015, the Dayton Unit NAACP launched a petition drive to oppose the Dayton Together Initiative for a City/County Merger. Foward led a group of community leaders to oppose the merger which would have disenfranchised over 140,000 residents of the city of Dayton. In September 2015, Foward successfully negotiated a settlement agreement with the Kettering City School District to ban the flying of Confederate Flags on school property and to implement diversity training throughout the district.

In February 2016, Foward was responsible for the chartering of the first NAACP High School Chapter in the State of Ohio. He paid for the first 25 charter members of the organization. The Move Foward Thurgood Marshall NAACP High Chapter was named after Foward and Thurgood Marshall for their Civil Rights work locally and nationally respectively. In March 2016, Foward urged Jefferson Township, Montgomery County, Ohio, Board of Trustees to fire Jeffrey Jones, firefighter for Jefferson Township, for racist remarks he made on Facebook regarding a commercial Foward was in with the owner of SVG Motors. The commercial in part focused on the fact that the Oscars did not have any African Americas nominated for any awards. Jones eventually resigned from his job days before he was to have a hearing.

In September 2017, Foward demanded the Franklin Township, Warren County, Ohio, Board of Trustees to fire Tyler Roysdon, a firefighter for Franklin Township, for racist remarks he made on Facebook. Roysdon was suspended indefinitely, and later resigned from his job.

In January 2018, the Dayton Unit NAACP hosted a Town Hall to hear from residents, educators, business leaders and parents, about the proposed Dayton Public School closures. Foward shared those concerns at the February 2018 DPS Board Meeting and urged members of the DPS School Board not to close any of the 9 proposed sites. That same month, Foward led a press conference, along with local pastors, to announce a community meeting that will be held with Premier Health executives and citizens of Dayton to address the impact the closing of Good Samaritan Hospital on the residents of Northwest Dayton. Foward urged Premier to reconsider their position to close the hospital.

In January 2019, Foward spoke before the Miamisburg City School District Board of Education and demanded swift action to be taken after the child of a client of the Dayton Unit NAACP was called racial slurs and ultimately assaulted by another student at Miamisburg Middle School. Foward called upon the district to implement a district-wide diversity training program. In May 2019, under the leadership of Foward, the Dayton Unit NAACP organized 3 days of events to divert people's attention away from the planned visit of the Honorable Sacred Knights from Indiana KKK.

In February 2020, Foward demanded that an employee of H&L Market be fired due to calling the organization's client the N-Word. Foward also negotiated a settlement agreement with the store which included cultural competency training for the staff, donations to community centers, community outreach and posting a public return policy in the store.

In March 2020, Foward met with Patricia Trammell, Building Management Committee Clerk for the American Friends Service Committee, along with another committee member, to discuss the possibility of the AFSC donating their Dayton, Ohio, office to the Dayton Unit NAACP.

In the wake of George Floyd's murder, the Jewish community sought guidance and direction from Foward on how to deal with racism in America. They sought his advice as Rabbi David Lefkowitz was one of the founding members of the Dayton Unit NAACP back in 1915. In addition, Foward worked with over 20 law enforcement agencies throughout Montgomery County, Ohio, to implement an 8-point strategy on criminal justice reform and police accountability. The Montgomery County Association of Chiefs of Police supported the strategy.

On November 1, 2020, the Dayton Unit NAACP officially moved into what is now known as the NAACP Dayton Headquarters located at 915 Salem Ave. The building was constructed in 1918 and had been owned by the American Friends Service Committee since 1964. Foward had negotiated with the AFSC leadership team in April 2020 to secure funding for capital improvement projects such as a new roof. In addition, Foward worked with the Montgomery County Land Bank to acquire the adjacent property at 911 Salem Ave. to construct a new parking lot for its clients and office volunteers.

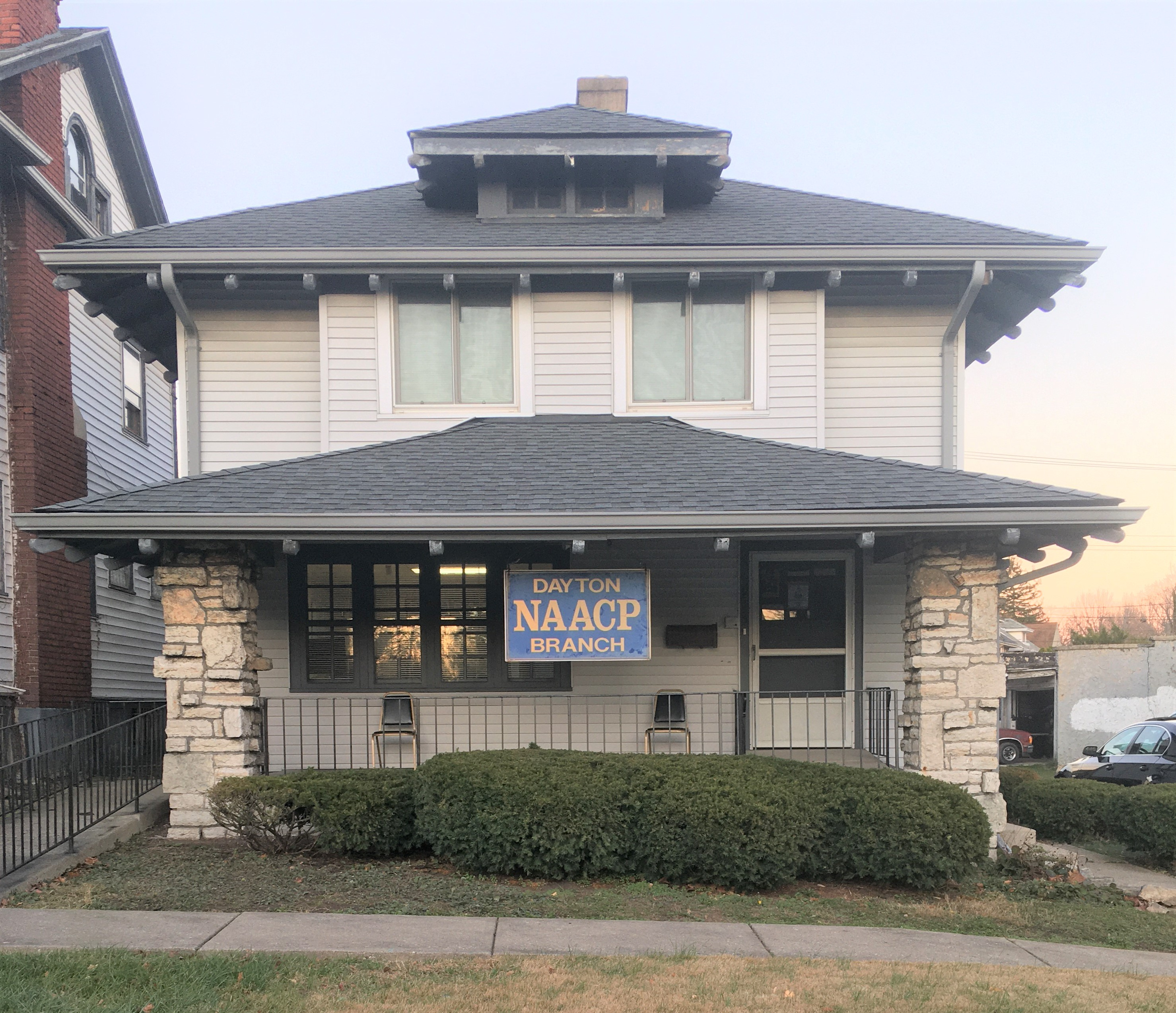
The NAACP Dayton Headquarters opened during Foward's time at the helm

That same month, Foward implemented a free turkey distribution service to help defray cost associated with the Thanksgiving holiday.

On April 17, 2021, Foward held a press conference with Jack Runser, a mute and disabled man suffering from Cerebral Palsy, to address his abnormal treatment by Dayton Police Officers. On October 4, 2021, Clifford Owensby Sr., a paraplegic man from Dayton filed a complaint with the Dayton Unit NAACP after he was dragged out of his car by his hair by a Dayton Police Officer. Owensby also filed a complaint with the DOJ and retained James Willis, Cleveland, Ohio-based attorney, as his legal counsel. In June 2023, the City of Dayton and the U.S. Department of Justice reached a settlement agreement in the case.

In January 2022, Brittney and Michelle Cooper filed a complaint with the Dayton Unit NAACP of behalf of Brandon Cooper, a Lyft Driver murdered in a robbery attempt. Foward worked closely with Michael Wright, family attorney, to hold Lyft accountable for the death of Cooper. Foward also provided data related to black-on-black murders, he called these murders senseless and spoke about how Black families are hurting when losing loved ones due to senseless gun violence. Foward also called upon legislators to pass sensible gun laws.

On October 28, 2022, Foward implemented an Awards Show to recognize Daytonians for their exceptional work, and the Dayton Unit NAACP officially launched the Dayton NAACP Hall of Freedom Awards. This was accomplished by the organization transitioning its Annual Freedom Fund Banquet to an Awards Show in the same year the organization turned 107 years old.

In January 2023, Latinka Hancock filed a complaint with the Dayton Unit NAACP after being assaulted by Butler Township, Montgomery County, Ohio, Police Officer Sgt. Todd Stanley over a piece of cheese that was left off of her Big Mac sandwich at McDonald's. Officer Tim Zellers pointed his taser in her face and threatened to deploy it. Foward demanded that Stanly be fired, but he was placed administrative leave. In September 2023, Stanley was found guilty of a first-degree misdemeanor assault charge.

In February 2023, during the 54th NAACP Image Awards, Foward was awarded the NAACP Image Award for Activist of the Year.

In April 2023, Foward implemented a free ham distribution service to help defray cost associated with the Easter holiday.

In August 2023, the City of Dayton and Dayton Unit NAACP client Jack Runser reached a $45,000 settlement agreement in the alleged police mistreatment case. On August 29, 2023, Foward organized a Grand Opening celebration for the NAACP Dayton Headquarters.

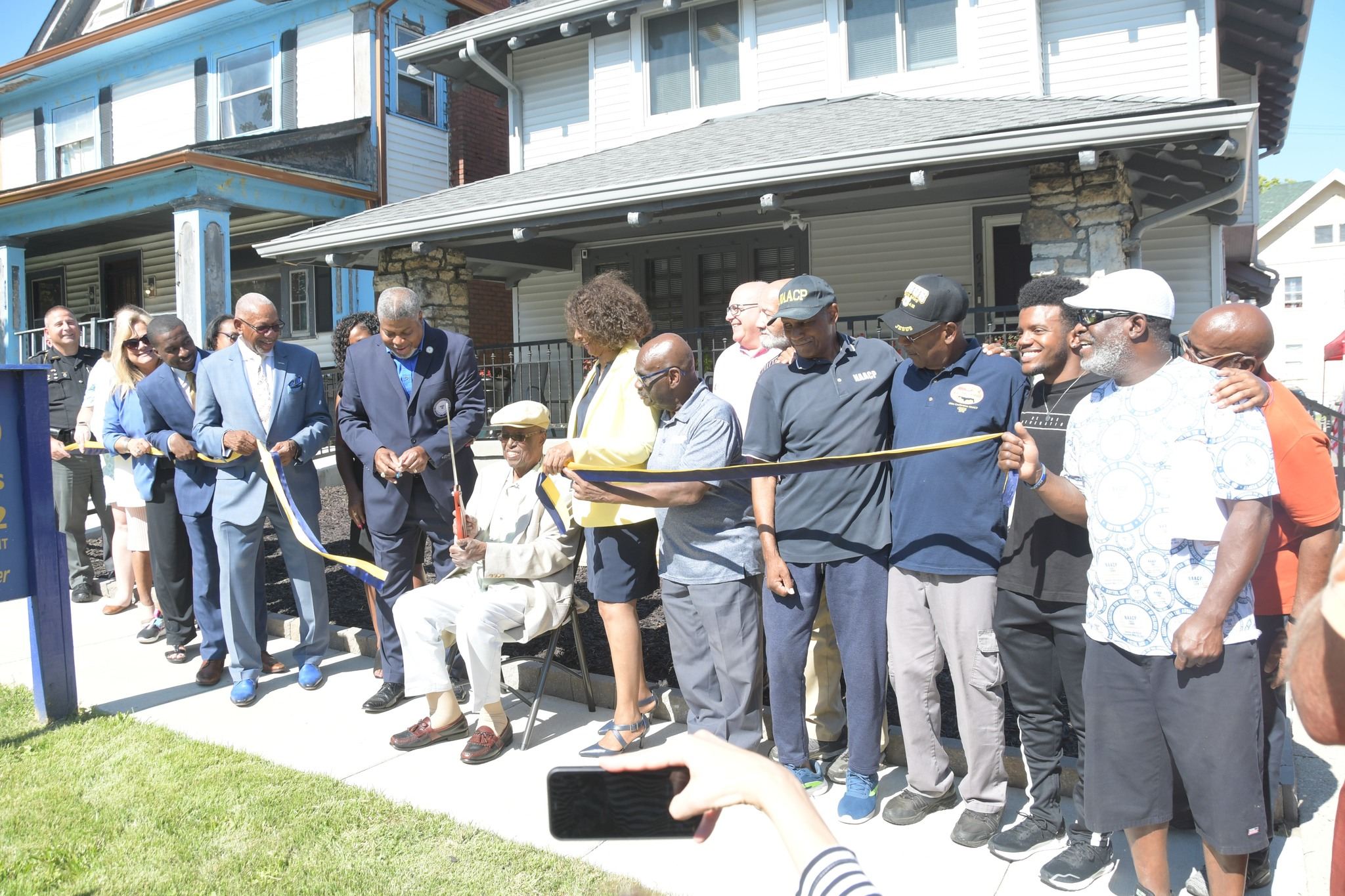
Foward at the grand opening celebration of the NAACP Dayton Headquarters

That same month, before the official Grand Opening of the NAACP Dayton Headquarters, Foward spearheaded conversations between Attorney Gary Leppla, Chair of the Dayton Unit NAACP Environmental and Climate Justice Committee, Solar United Neighbors and the Eichelberger Foundation, to obtain the necessary funding to become the first business on the Salem Avenue Corridor to install solar panels. This was the last phase of the capital improvement project before opening the business.

In October 2023, the Dayton Branch NAACP expanded its Hall of Freedom Awards to include Lt. Col Charity Adams Earley and Judge Arthur O. Fisher.

In a meeting led by Foward on January 29, 2024, the Dayton Unit of the NAACP reached a settlement agreement between their client Helen Dewberry and Sleep Number, for the unwarranted interaction she received at their store located at 2599 Miamisburg Centerville Rd. in Miami Township. Sleep Number agreed to the following recommendations: Issued a verbal, followed by a written apology to Ms. Dewberry; Undisclosed financial settlement agreement; Diffusion, de-escalation and bias free customer service training for all store personnel starting on February 3, 2024; and other management decisions will be made with store personnel pending outcome of store meeting.

On June 3, 2024, in his role as Compliance Officer and Trainer of the Ohio Conference NAACP, Foward held an organizational meeting to start the process to officially charter an Athens County NAACP in Southeast Ohio.

On November 3, 2024, Foward was re-elected to his tenth two-year term as President of the Dayton Branch NAACP. This election made him the longest serving president in the 109-year-old history of the organization.

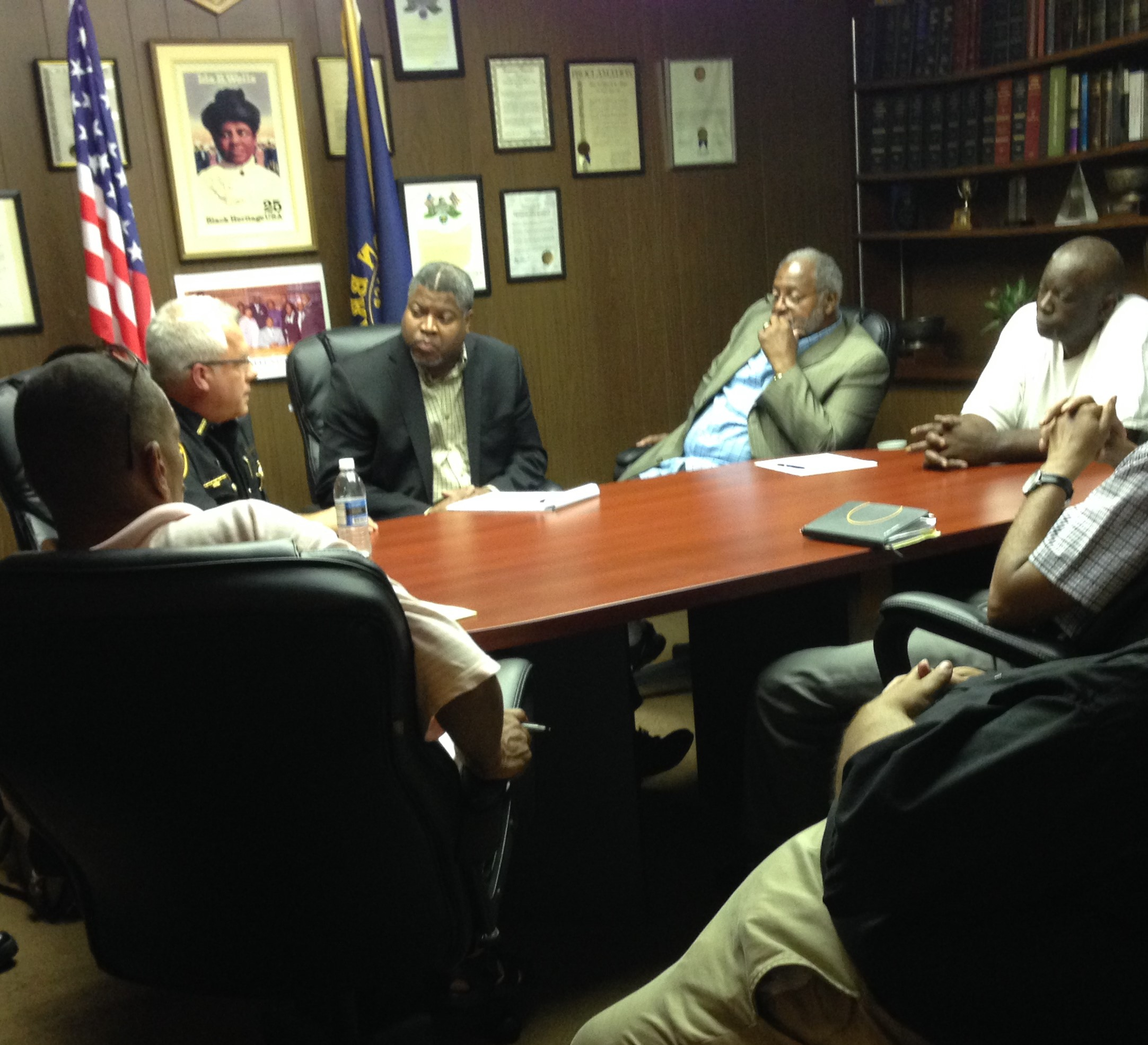
Sheriff Phil Plummer at Dayton Unit NAACP office to discuss text message case

In May 2025, Congressman Mike Turner invited Foward to participate in the NATO Parliamentary Assembly Spring Session held in Dayton, Ohio. Foward delivered introductory remarks during the panel discussion titled, “The Role of Cultural Exchanges in Building Lasting Ties.”

Foward Speaks During NATO Spring Session in Dayton, Ohio

== Montgomery County Ohio Sheriff's Office Investigation ==
On November 30, 2014, Foward filed a complaint on behalf of the Citizens of Montgomery County, Ohio against 6 Sheriff Deputies who were participating in racially motivated text conversations that contained derogatory jokes and threats to the African American community in Dayton, and abroad. Foward met with Sheriff Phil Plummer and Major Daryl Wilson at the Dayton Brach NAACP office to provide them with a discovery packet and urged for swift decisive action to be taken. As a result of this complaint, Capt. Tom Flanders was terminated. Detective Mike Sollenberger was terminated. Deputy Joseph Connelly received a 30-day suspension, Deputy Jamie Horton received a 10-day suspension and Sgt. Brian Lewis received a 3-day suspension. Detective Brad Daugherty was not disciplined for his role in the text message case.

== Legislation ==
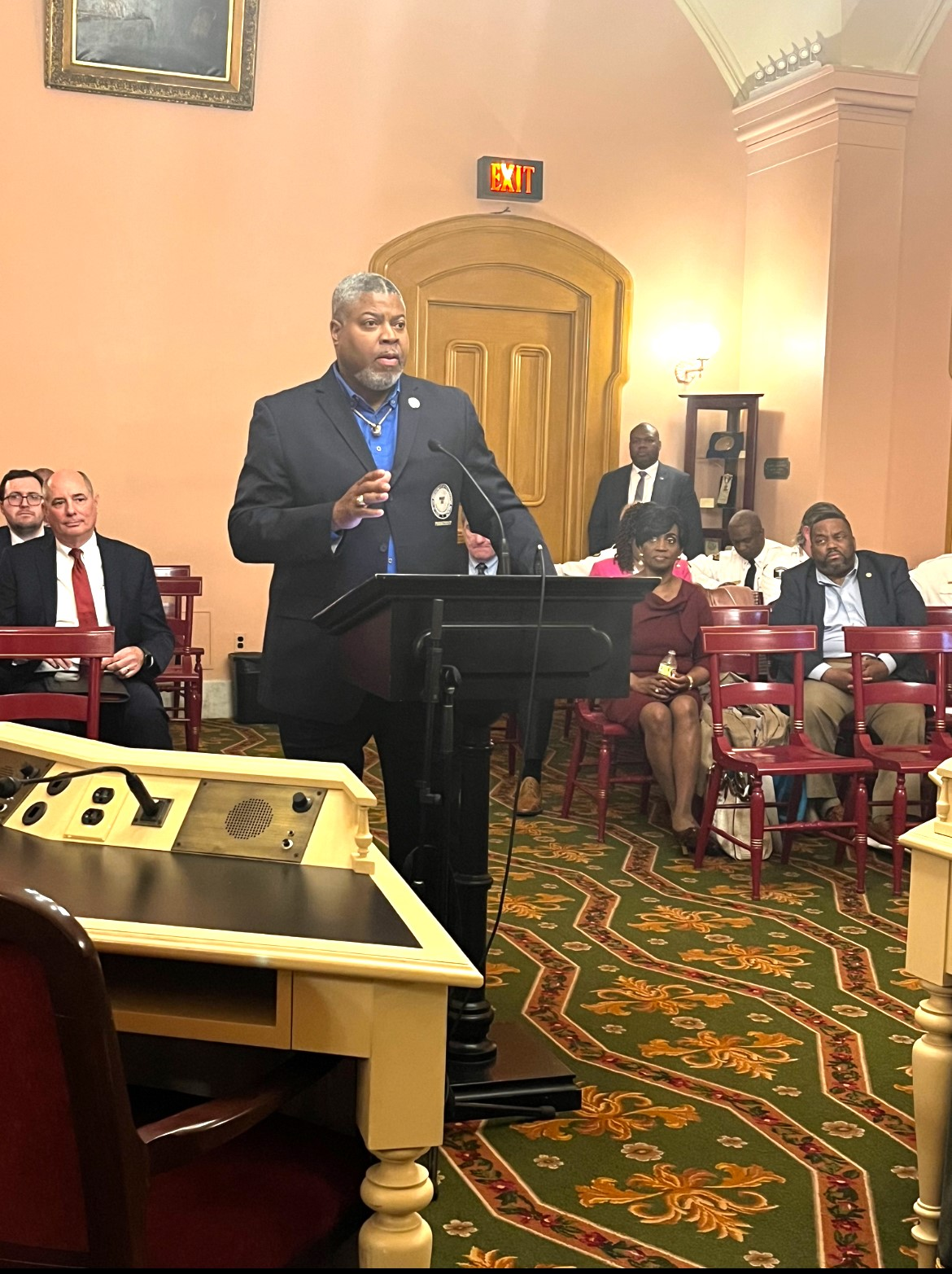
Foward provides testimony on Ohio HB56 Anti-Hooning legislation

In 2010, Foward organized a press conference with leaders from the Dayton Public Schools District to address the ending of the 38-year-old Desegregation Case that was filed by the NAACP in 1972.

In 2013, Foward slammed the decision of the U.S. Supreme Court to invalidate key parts of the Civil Rights Act of 1964 and urged Congressman Mike Turner to vote to restore those key elements as he had done in 2006.

In 2014, Foward urged Congressman Mike Turner to support the Voting Rights Amendment Act. The Dayton Unit NAACP holds candidate forums for Special, Primary and General Elections.

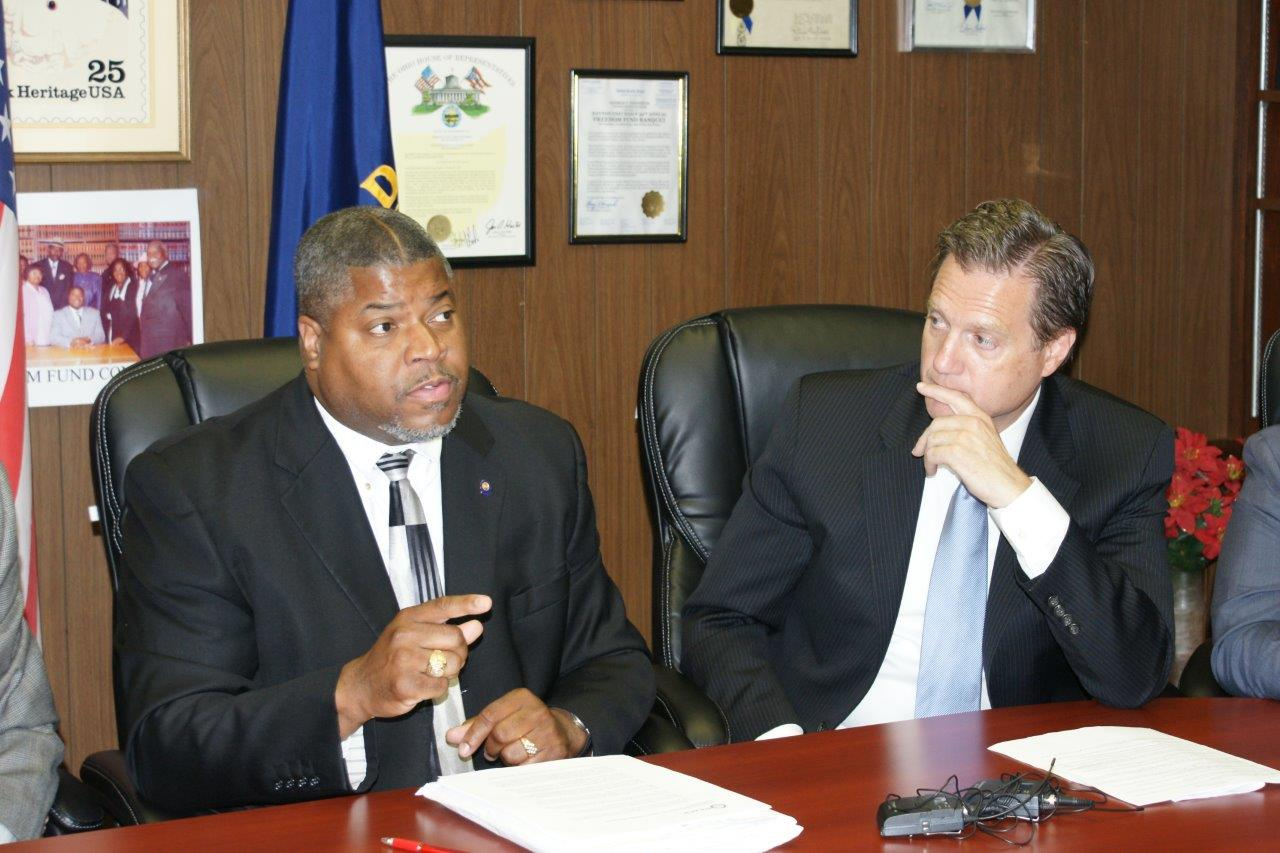
Foward urges Congressman Turner to support Affordable Care Act and The Voting Rights Amendment Act of 2015

In 2017, Foward lobbied Congresswoman Joyce Beatty on several NAACP legislative priorities, along with Hilary O. Shelton, NAACP Sr. VP of advocacy and policy and director of the Washington Bureau and Tom Roberts, former Ohio State Senator and current president of the Ohio Conference NAACP. In November of that year, Foward announced that the Dayton Unit NAACP planned to launch a petition drive to outlaw the use of Red Light Cameras if police are not present.

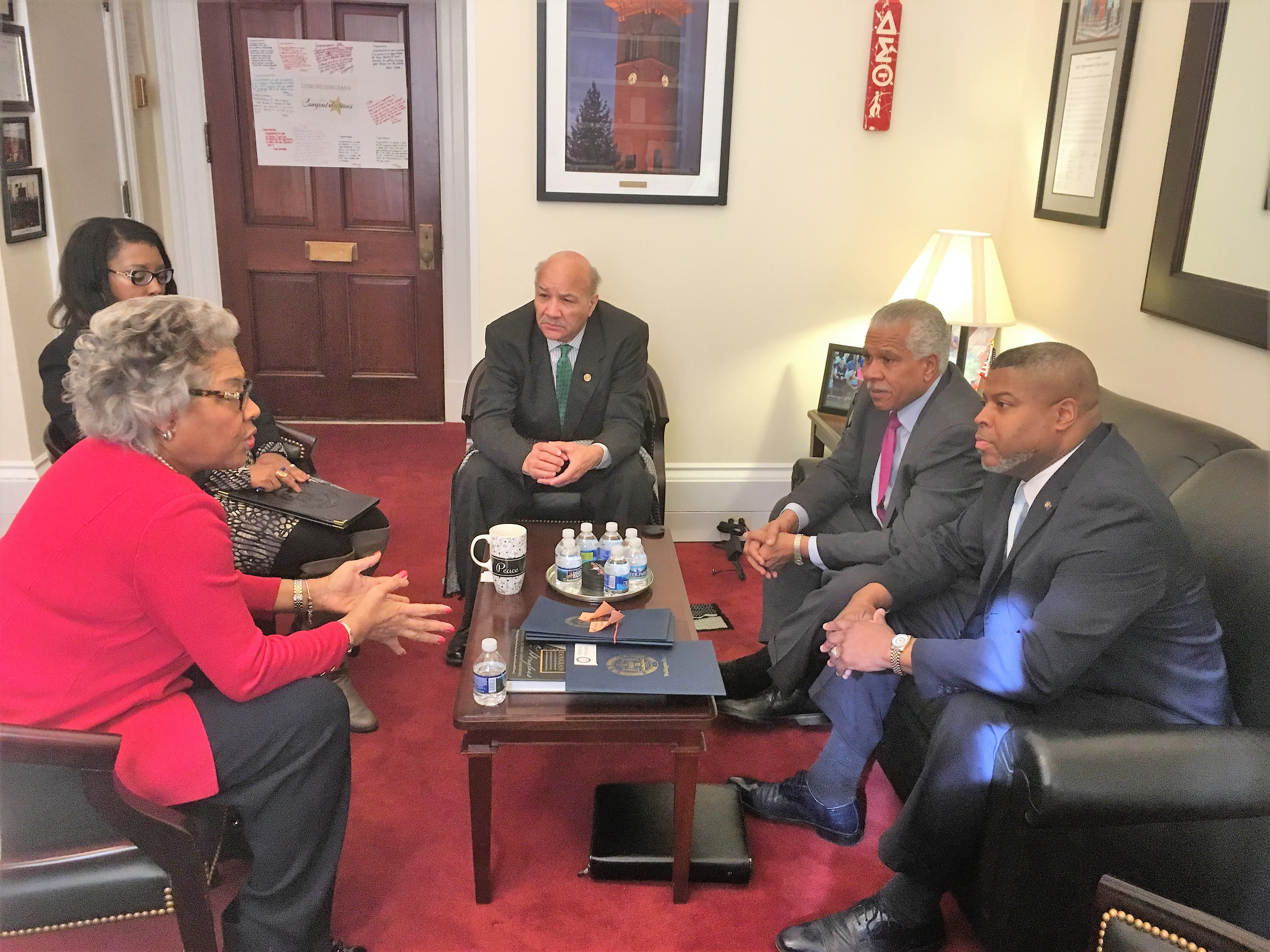
Foward urges Congresswoman Beatty to support NAACP legislative priorities

In 2021, Foward provided testimony before the Ohio Redistricting Commission at Sinclair Community College.

On November 15, 2022, Foward organized a press conference to address period equity due to ongoing health care disparities related to the inadequate supply of feminine hygiene products in Ohio prisons. He provided a platform for Kayelin Tiggs, Chair of the Dayton Unit NAACP Women in the NAACP Committee (WIN), along with a former inmate of Dayton Correctional Institution, to address the concern.

On March 28, 2023, Foward provided testimony before the Ohio House of Representatives Criminal Justice Committee on House Bill 56, known as the Anti-Hooning Bill. The hooning started to become a real safety concern in early 2020. In his leadership role as president of Northern Hills Neighborhood Association and on behalf of its citizens, Foward filed a formal complaint with the City of Dayton, the City of Trotwood and the Montogomery County Sheriff's Office which led to a press conference he organized with the leadership of those institutions on November 9, 2020. Foward provided pictures and videos of this illegal and unsafe activity to the law enforcement agencies for evidence and enforcement purposes.

On March 26, 2025, Foward participated in the Ohio Legislative Black Caucus (OLBC) press conference urging Governor Mike DeWine to VETO Senate Bill (SB) 1.

== Awards and honors ==
Foward has earned the following awards and honors for his activism:

- Parity, Inc. Top Ten African American Male Award (2009)
- Eta Phi Beta sorority. Lambda chapter Heart of Gold Honoree (2009)
- Speedway Living Our Values "Volunteer of the Year" Award (2012)
- Under the leadership of Foward, the Dayton Unit NAACP has been awarded the Thalheimer Award for 10 years in a row (2012 – 2019; 2022 – 2024), except the two COVID-19 years (2020 & 2021) when the NAACP did not accept nominations.

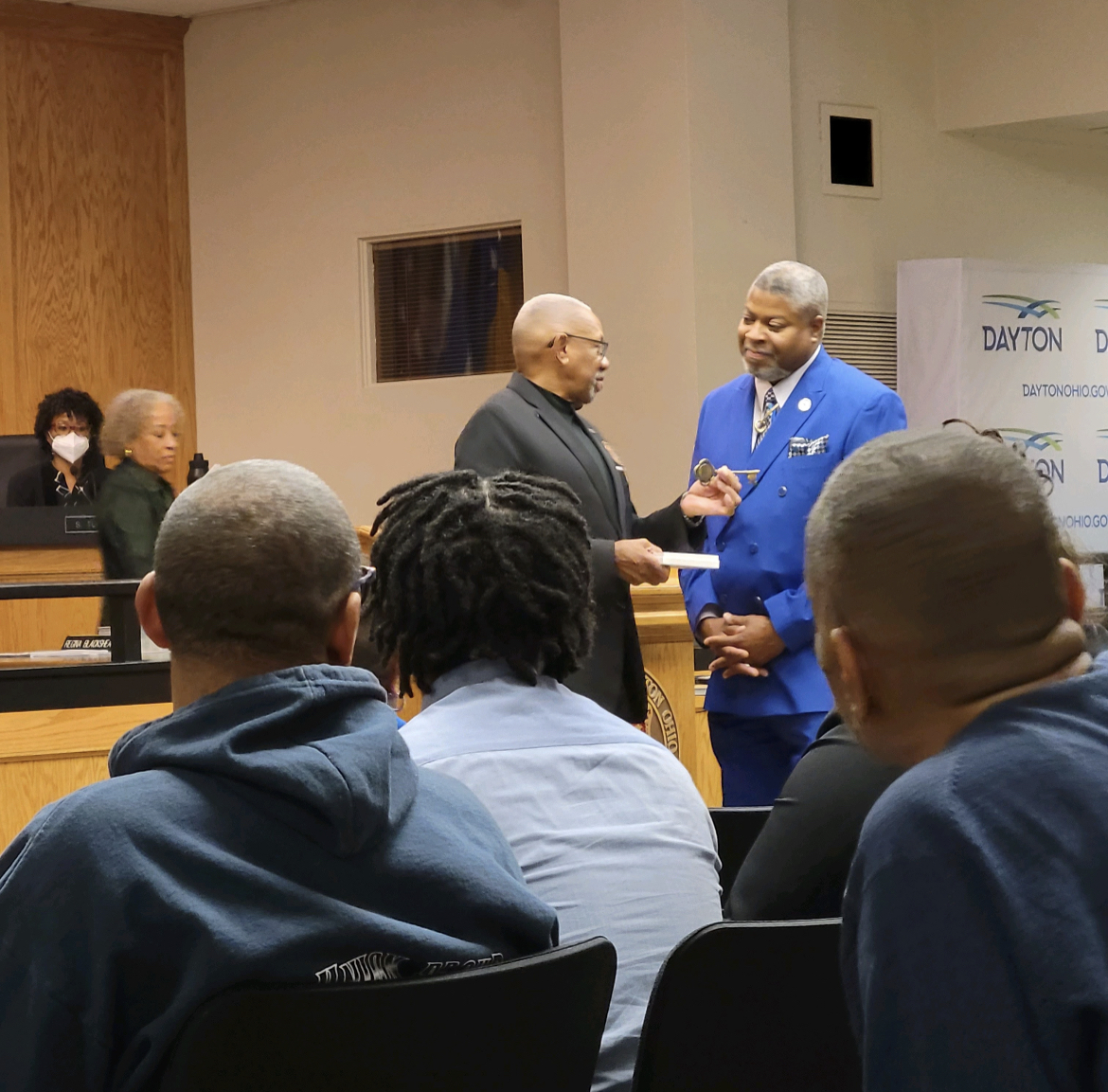
Dayton Mayor Jeffery J. Mims Jr. Presents Foward with a Key to the City on May 3, 2023

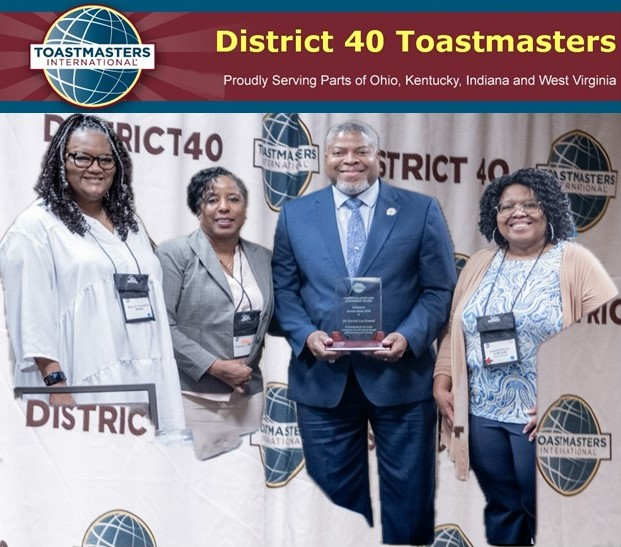
Luvenia Boyer, DTM District Director for Toastmasters District 40, presents Communication and Leadership Award to Foward

- Rupert Richardson Memorial Leadership Award (2012)
- Access to Justice Community Advocacy Award (2015)
- Omega Psi Phi fraternity, Delta Alpha chapter, Citizen of the Year Award (2015–2016)
- In 2016, Foward received the Cardinal Joseph Louis Bernardin Community Service Award in recognition for his contributions to the community and his faithful service.
- In 2016, Foward was instrumental in establishing the first NAACP High School Chapter in the State of Ohio, the Move Foward Thurgood Marshall NAACP High School Chapter, located at Thurgood Marshall High School. He paid for the first 25 members of the chapter. The organization is named after Foward and US Supreme Court Justice Thurgood Marshall.
- The Inaugural Gospel Superfest Community Service Award (2018) for outstanding service to the community
- NAACP Image Award for Activist of the Year (2023)
- On May 3, 2023, Jeffrey J. Mims Jr., Mayor of the City of Dayton presented Foward with a Key to the city, for his selfless devotion and relentless efforts to combat racism and ensure equity and equality throughout Dayton.
- On April 27, 2024, Toastmasters International District 40 presented Foward with the Communication and Leadership Award during their Annual Conference in Fairborn, Ohio.
- On May 26, 2024, Visual Voices honored and recognized Foward as a Dayton Skyscraper along with Judge Mia Wortham-Spells, the late Carolyn Y. Perkins, Dr. Anthony B. Whitmore and Rev. Dr. Xavier L. Johnson.

Awards and achievements
Preceded by Scot X. Esdaile	NAACP Image Award; 2023	Succeeded by TBD
