= NAACP Image Award – Jackie Robinson Sports Award =

Former American sports award

This article lists the recipients of the Jackie Robinson Sports Award, which is an honorary NAACP Image Award. The award is given to athletes who have promoted social justice through creative endeavors. It was retired after 1999 and revived in 2017 with LeBron James being the first recipient.

The NAACP Image Award winners for the Jackie Robinson Sports Award:

Year	Winner	Sport	Ref
1988	Wilma Rudolph, Harlem Globetrotters	Track and field, basketball	
1989	Jackie Joyner-Kersee, Sugar Ray Robinson	Track and field, boxing	
1990	Roy Campanella, Anita DeFrantz	Baseball, rowing	
1992	Magic Johnson	Basketball	
1996	Eddie Robinson	Football (coach)	
1997	Jim Brown	Football	
1999	Michael Jordan	Basketball	
2017	LeBron James	Basketball	
2021	Stephen Curry, WNBA Players Association	Basketball	
2023	Serena Williams	Tennis	
