= Desiree Tims =

American politician

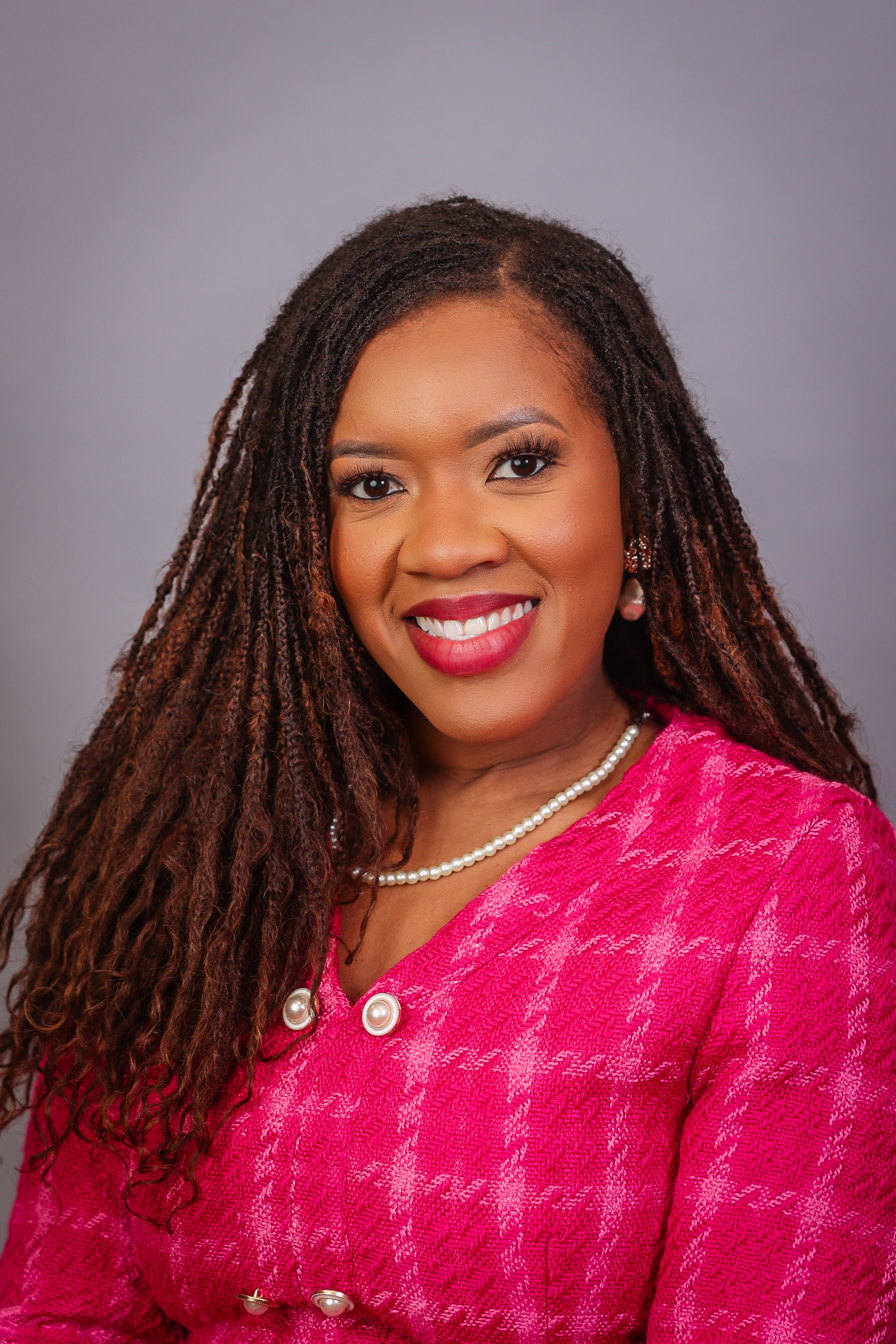
- Tims in 2025

Member of the Ohio House of Representatives from the 38th district
- Incumbent
- Assumed office January 6, 2025
- Preceded by: Willis Blackshear Jr.

Personal details
- Born: Dayton, Ohio U.S.
- Party: Democratic
- Education: Xavier University (BA); Georgetown University Law Center (JD)

Desiree Tims is an American politician serving as a member of the Ohio House of Representatives for the 38th district. Elected in 2024, she assumed office on January 6, 2025. She is a Democrat.

== Early life and education ==
Tims was born in Dayton, Ohio, and graduated from Dunbar High School in 2006. She went on to earn a Bachelor of Arts at Xavier University and a Juris Doctor from the Georgetown University Law Center.

== Career ==
Tims interned at the White House under Barack Obama and worked as an aide to U.S. Senators Sherrod Brown and Kirsten Gillibrand. She was previously elected to serve as President of the Senate Black Legislative Staff Caucus, worked as a senior advisor for Child Care Aware of America, director of judiciary programs at the League of Conservation Voters, and as a law clerk at Dinsmore & Shohl.

She went on to serve as President & CEO of Innovation Ohio, a progressive think tank.

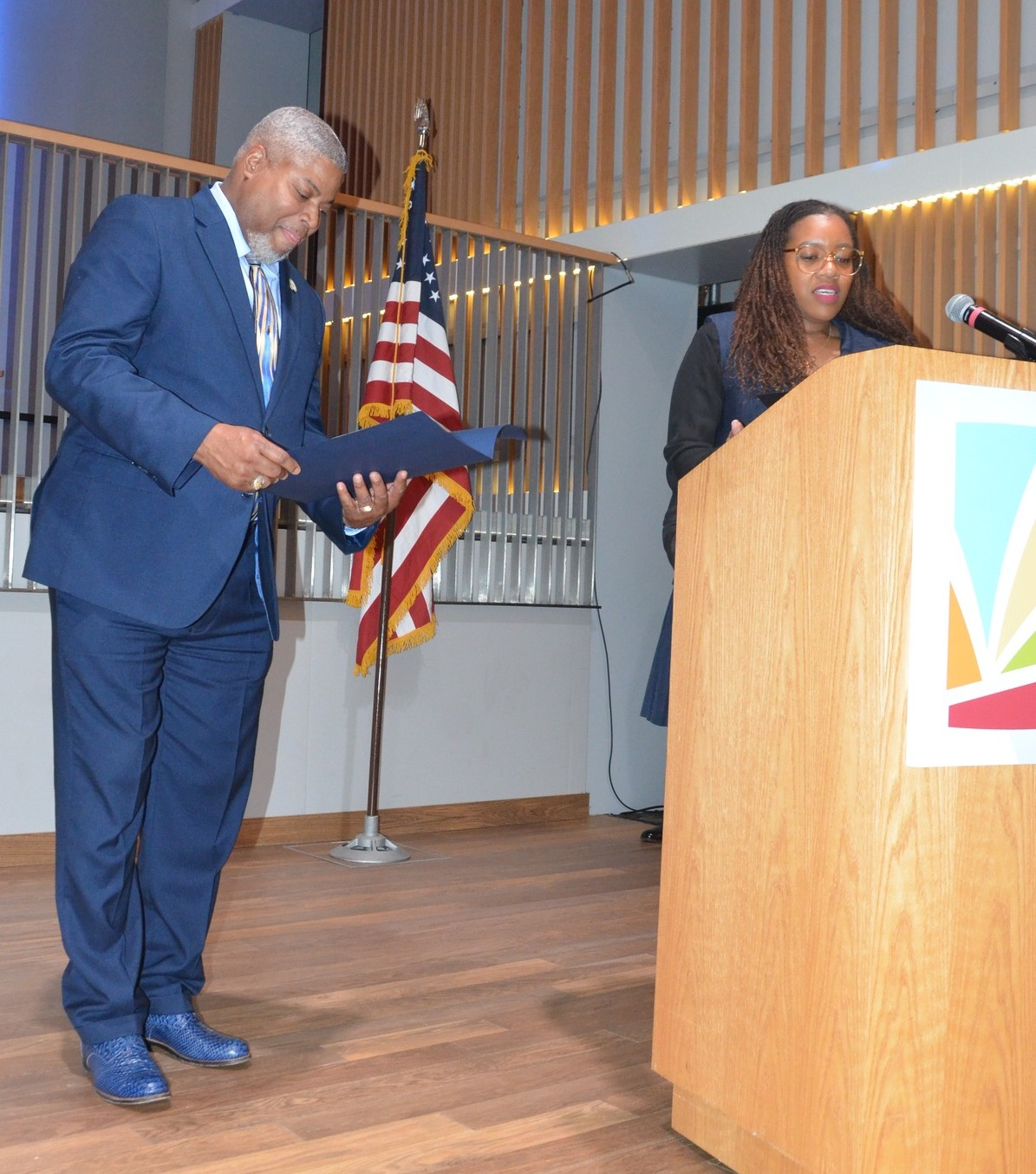
On January 9, 2025, during the Dayton Branch NAACP 55th Inauguration Ceremony, Tims presents her first two Commendations as an Ohio State Representative to Dayton NAACP President Dr. Derrick L. Foward and the Dayton Branch NAACP.

== Ohio House of Representatives ==
=== 2020 congressional campaign ===
Tims announced her campaign for the U.S. House of Representatives in Ohio's 10th congressional district on August 14, 2019, against incumbent Republican Mike Turner. From April to June, she outraised Turner by approximately $300,000 in campaign donations. Tims was added to the DCCC's Red to Blue program, indicating national attention and a potentially competitive race. Turner accused her of campaign finance violations after she missed two deadlines for filing financial disclosure reports and for taking a salary from the Ohio Democratic Party while running, which she disputed. She received 41.6% of the vote and was defeated by Turner.

=== State Representative ===
Tims ran for the Ohio House of Representatives in the 38th district in 2024, where incumbent Rep. Willis Blackshear Jr. was retiring to run for the Ohio Senate. She defeated Derrick L. Foward in the Democratic primary with 71% of the vote and was unopposed in the general election. She was sworn in on January 6, 2025.

=== Committee assignments ===
As of June 2026, Tims serves on the following committees in the Ohio House:

- Financial Institutions
- Judiciary
- Medicaid
- Redistricting
- Rules and Reference
- Workforce and Higher Education

=== Electoral History ===
Election results
Year	Office	Election	Votes for Tims	%	Opponent	Party	Votes	%
2024	Ohio House of Representatives	Primary	6,122	71.73%	Derrick L. Foward	Democratic	2,413	28.27%
2024	Ohio House of Representatives	General	34,877	100%				
