= Nan Whaley =

American politician (born 1976)

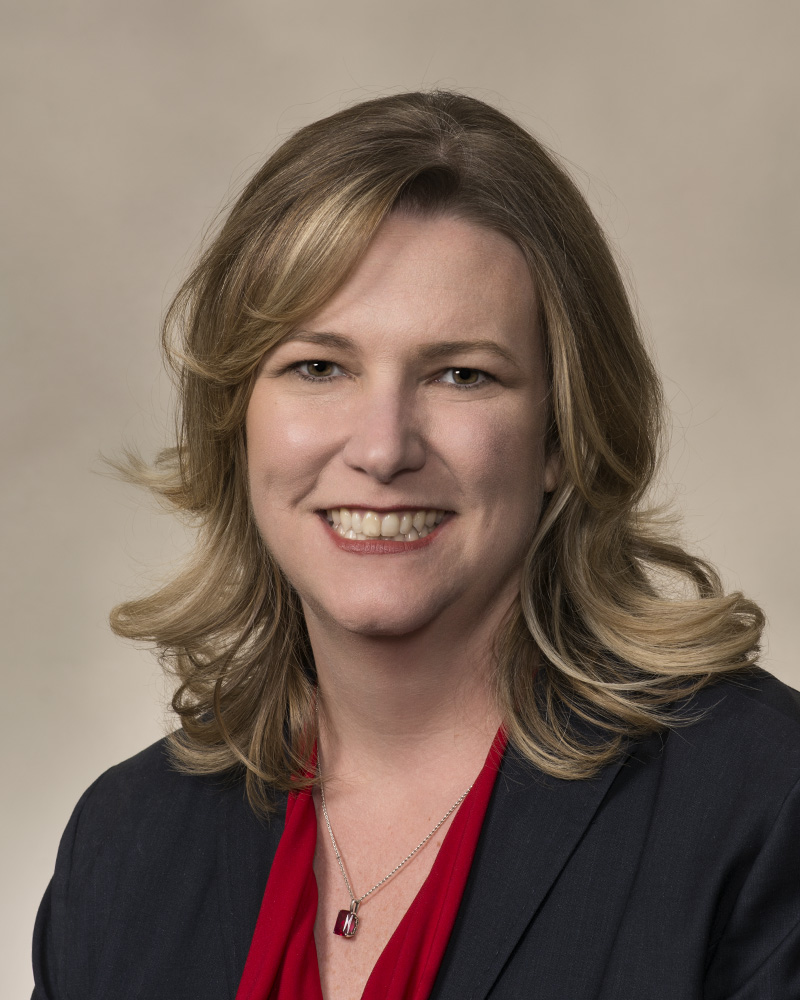
- Whaley in 2018

56th Mayor of Dayton
- In office January 4, 2014 – January 4, 2022
- Preceded by: Gary Leitzell
- Succeeded by: Jeff Mims

79th President of the United States Conference of Mayors
- In office 2021–2022
- Preceded by: Greg Fischer
- Succeeded by: Francis Suarez

Personal details
- Born: January 23, 1976 (age 50) Mooresville, Indiana, U.S.
- Party: Democratic
- Spouse: Sam Braun
- Education: University of Dayton (BA); Wright State University (MPA)

Nannette L. Whaley (/ˈweɪli/; born January 23, 1976) is an American politician who served as the 56th mayor of Dayton, Ohio, from 2014 to 2022. A member of the Democratic Party, she previously served on the city commission for two terms and presided over the United States Conference of Mayors from 2021 to 2022. She was the Democratic nominee in the 2022 Ohio gubernatorial election, losing to incumbent Mike DeWine in a landslide.

== Early life and education ==
Whaley grew up in Indiana, but she has lived in Ohio since attending the University of Dayton from 1994 to 1998, where she earned a bachelor's degree in chemistry. In college, Whaley was the Ohio chair of the College Democrats of America. Whaley is also a four-time delegate to the Democratic National Convention, worked for John Kerry's presidential campaign, and served as a presidential elector. Whaley later earned a Master of Public Administration in urban studies from Wright State University.

During the 2000 presidential election, Whaley was an Ohio state co-chair of GoreNet. GoreNet was a group that supported the Al Gore campaign with a focus on grassroots and online organizing as well as hosting small dollar donor events.

== Career ==
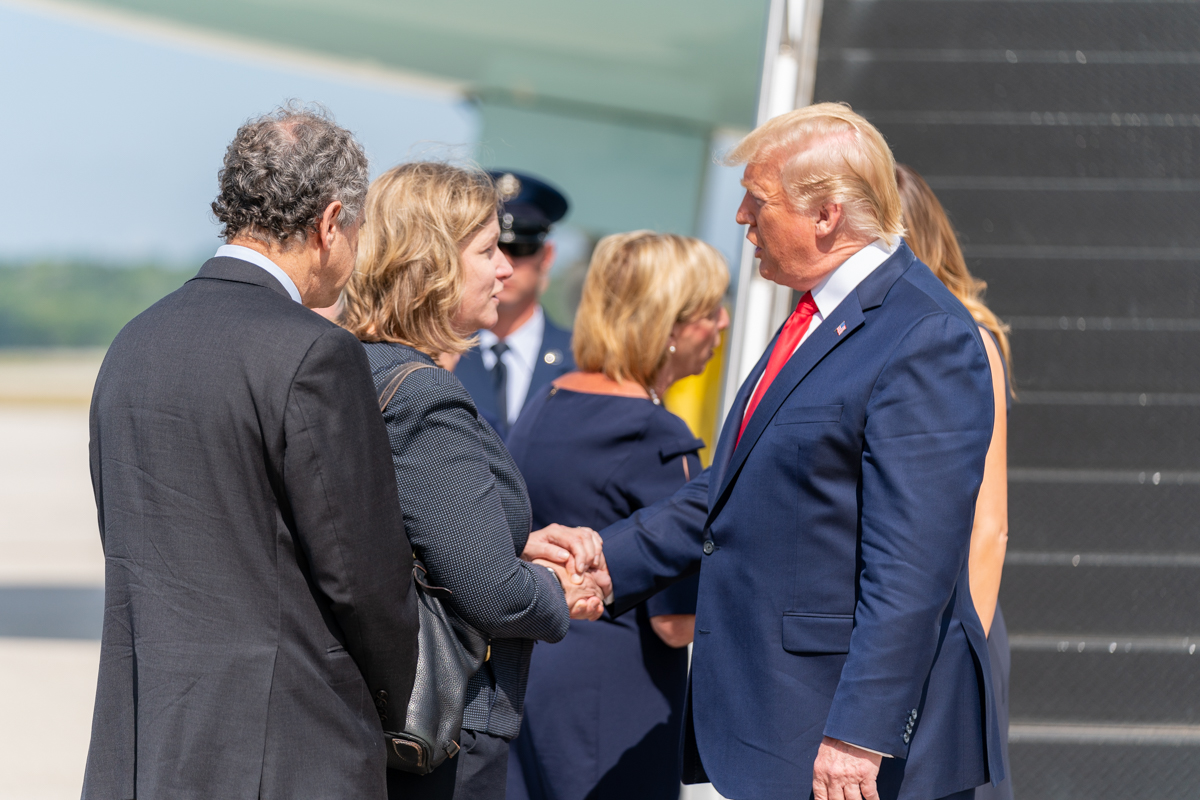
Whaley and U.S. Senator Sherrod Brown greet President Donald Trump at Wright-Patterson Air Force Base in August 2019

Whaley was first elected to the Dayton City Commission in 2005. She was one of the youngest women chosen for a commission seat. Whaley served on the Montgomery County Board of Elections and as a deputy to Montgomery County Auditor Karl Keith.

Whaley was first elected mayor of Dayton in 2013, winning 56 percent of the vote. In 2017, she was unopposed for reelection, making it the first uncontested mayoral race in the city's history since voters have elected the office separately. Before her election as mayor she served on Greater Ohio's Community Revitalization Committee, the Learn to Earn Executive Committee for Education, the Montgomery County Planning Commission and the Dayton Access Television Board of Trustees.

Early in her time in office, Whaley founded the Dayton Region Manufacturing Task Force, "a regional effort committed to advocating for manufacturing and promoting a strong manufacturing workforce." Initiatives like this and a surge of high tech and research jobs have spurred $600,000,000 in investment in the region. During Whaley's term, the unemployment rate in Dayton declined from 9.3% to 5.5%.

In response to a statewide surge in opioid-related drug overdoses, Whaley declared a citywide state of emergency and developed a needle exchange program. Dayton also began to ensure that first-responders had access to the overdose-reversal drug naloxone. Whaley has been consistently critical of the state government for failing to adequately fund opioid treatment and recovery programs. In 2017, Dayton was the fourth city in the country to sue the pharmaceutical companies, opioid drug distributors and physicians they say are responsible for Ohio's opioid addiction and overdose crisis.

The City of Learners initiative was launched by Whaley in early 2014 as a citywide effort to support Dayton's schools and students. A committee of community leaders and volunteers identified five areas of community focus: ensure all children attend a high quality school, ensure high quality preschool is offered to all children, increase business partnerships with schools, provide mentors to more children, and expand sites for after school and summer learning. In 2016, Dayton voters passed a 0.25% income tax increase which included a guaranteed year of preschool to all Dayton families with a 4-year-old.

Whaley placed significant emphasis on reviving downtown Dayton, drawing over $200 million in downtown investments and in a refocus of the region into new ventures; she had focused especially on the Arcade Building. As a result of some new renewal efforts, new businesses have begun to move into the downtown area, including a number of small businesses and startups.

As a previous board member of the Bike Walk Dayton Committee, Whaley also worked to make Dayton a bicycle-friendly community. Her administration oversaw the implementation of Dayton's first Bike Share program in 2015. She was also a strong advocate for a county-wide landbank system to address the region's housing crisis with a more regional approach and serves on the Montgomery County Landbank Board.

=== 2019 mass shooting ===
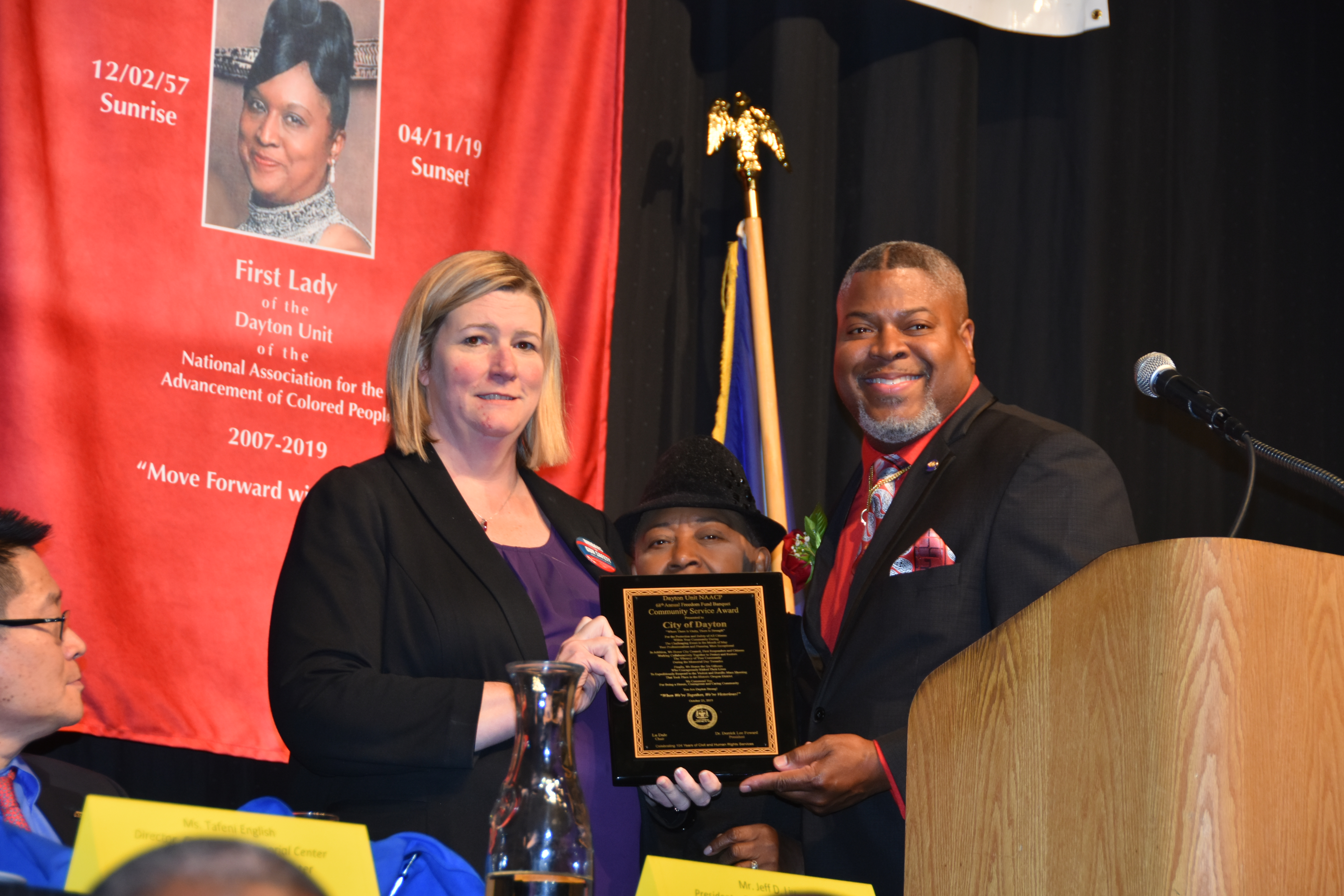
Dayton NAACP President Derrick L. Foward presents Community Service Award to Dayton Mayor Nan Whaley.

After a mass shooting occurred on August 4, 2019, she and Ohio Senator Sherrod Brown accompanied President Donald Trump on a visit with survivors at the local hospital. Ten people were killed, including the perpetrator; and twenty-seven were injured. She joined over 200 mayors in encouraging Congress to act on gun control legislation that is already before them. The group included Dee Margo, the mayor of El Paso, Texas, where a shooting occurred the day before. According to Dayton NAACP President Derrick L. Foward, Whaley received the Dayton Unit NAACP Community Service Award for the leadership she provided in guiding the City of Dayton through the violent and horrific mass shooting that took place in the Historic Oregon District.

== Gubernatorial campaigns ==
=== 2018 ===
Ahead of the 2018 election cycle, Whaley considered a run for Congress before declaring her candidacy for governor of Ohio. On May 8, 2017, Whaley announced that she was running for governor in the 2018 election on a platform of job creation. She dropped out of the race on January 12, 2018, and endorsed Richard Cordray.

=== 2022 ===
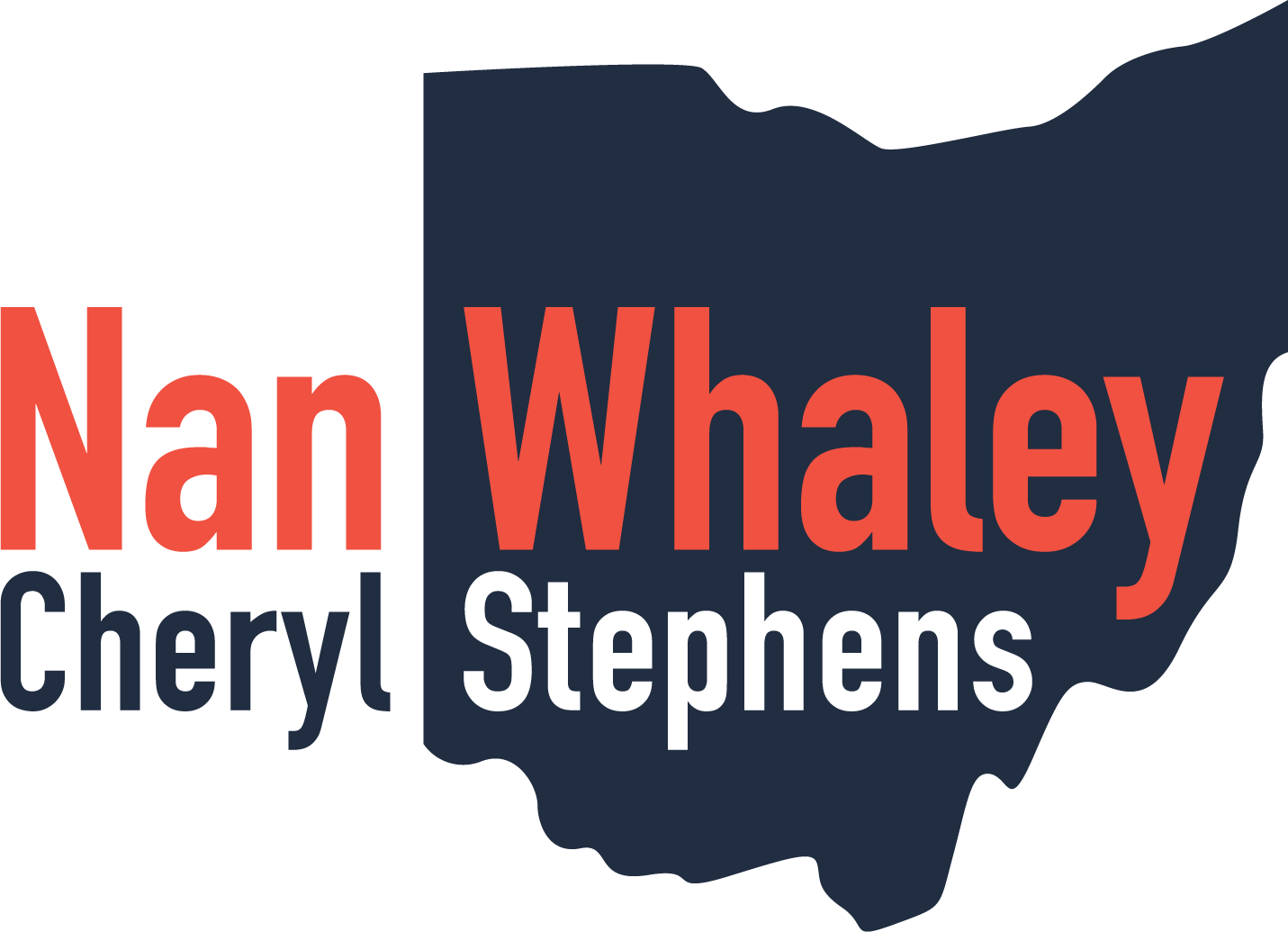
Whaley's 2022 campaign logo

On April 19, 2021, Whaley announced her candidacy in the 2022 Ohio gubernatorial election. She faced former Cincinnati Mayor John Cranley for the Democratic nomination to be Governor of Ohio. On May 3, Whaley won the Democratic primary election and became the Democratic nominee for Ohio Governor. This made her the first woman to win a major party nomination to run for governor of Ohio and, because she was running with Cheryl Stephens, part of the first all-female ticket nominated by a major party for governor and lieutenant governor in that state. Whaley and Stephens lost the race to incumbents Mike DeWine and Jon Husted getting 37.4% of votes to DeWine and Husted's 62.4%. Whaley gave her concession speech on November 8, 2022, in Dayton, Ohio.

== Personal life ==
In 1998, she settled in the Five Oaks neighborhood in Dayton where she and her husband Sam reside today.

Political offices
Preceded by Gary Leitzell	Mayor of Dayton; 2014–2022	Succeeded by Jeff Mims
Party political offices
Preceded by Richard Cordray	Democratic nominee for Governor of Ohio; 2022	Succeeded by Amy Acton
