= Thalheimer Award =

Internal NAACP award (e. 1944)

The Thalheimer Award is awarded annually by the National Association for the Advancement of Colored People (NAACP) for outstanding programs and publications by State, State Area Conferences and Local Units of the NAACP.. The award was created in 1944 by Dr. Ross Thalheimer, psychologist, university professor and author.
