= NAACP Image Award for Activist of the Year =

The NAACP Image Award winners for Activist of the Year.

== List of recipients ==
Year	Awards Show	Winner	Reference
2025	56th NAACP Image Awards	NAACP Image Award for Activist of the Year Was Not Awarded in 2025	
2024	55th NAACP Image Awards	NAACP Image Award for Activist of the Year Was Not Awarded in 2024	
2023	54th NAACP Image Awards	Dr. Derrick L. Foward Derrick L. Foward (Dayton, OH) - NAACP Activist of the Year - 2023	
2022	53rd NAACP Image Awards	Scot X. Esdaile Scot X Esdaile (New Haven, CT) - NAACP Activist of the Year - 2022	
2021	52nd NAACP Image Awards	Rev. Dr. Wendell Anthony Rev. Wendell Anthony (Detroit, MI) - NAACP Activist of the Year - 2021	
2020	51st NAACP Image Awards	Teresa Haley Teresa Haley (Springfield, IL) - NAACP Activist of the Year - 2020	
