= Gary Leitzell =

American politician

55th Mayor of Dayton, Ohio
- In office January 4, 2010 – January 4, 2014
- Preceded by: Rhine McLin
- Succeeded by: Nan Whaley

Personal details
- Born: 1961 (age 64–65)
- Party: Independent
- Spouse: Deborah Cool-Llorens
- Children: 1
- Website: gogarygo.com

Gary Leitzell is an American businessman and the former mayor of the city of Dayton, Ohio. He is notable for having won as an independent on a highly limited budget, as well as bringing business ideas to politics and advocating limited campaign spending.

== Biography ==
Leitzell was born in McKeesport, Pennsylvania in 1961. His father was a former member of the U.S. Air Force who worked in a steel mill; his mother was a British overseas bride. Leitzell moved as a child to Chippenham, England in 1970, where he attended a public grammar school. Leitzell graduated from the University of London with a bachelor's degree in geology in 1982 and returned to the United States to reacquaint himself with a father whom he had not seen in twelve years. Leitzell then worked in the Pittsburgh, Pennsylvania area in several sales and sales management positions until 1994. After two layoffs and one merger within the first ten years of his entering the corporate workforce, he made the decision to pursue a hobby-related business (miniature painting) in 1994, a decision that allowed him the opportunity to travel throughout the United States. In late 1994, he moved to Dayton, Ohio.

== Political career ==
In Dayton Leitzell became involved with the Southeast Priority board in 1999. He was elected to chair the board in 2008 and 2009 and was the president of his neighborhood association for six terms.

Leitzell ran for mayor of Dayton, Ohio as an independent candidate in 2009 and upset Rhine McLin, the incumbent Democrat. He won on a $17,600 budget and was outspent by the incumbent (approx. $160,000). His term as mayor began on January 4, 2010.

On September 28, 2012, Leitzell announced his intention to seek re-election for a second term as Dayton mayor in 2013. He encouraged potential opposing candidates to limit spending and welcomed the introduction of newcomers, stating that he would not spend more than $10,000 and $10,000 "in kind" to get re-elected. He challenged opposing candidates to meet that figure, but upped the cap to $20,000 and $10,000 "in kind" for any unknown candidate that did not already have established name recognition. He also declared that he would not seek any political endorsements, feeling that if he could not win on his own merit, then the job was not suited for him.

In January 2013, Nan Whaley, a member of the Dayton City Commission, Democrat, announced her intention to run against Leitzell in the 2013 election. She stated she planned on "...using clear communication and teamwork in order get things done," should she be elected. In her announcement, she did not comment on Leitzell's proposal regarding campaign spending. A.J. Wagner, a local judge, has also announced his intention to run.

On January 17, 2013, Leitzell was interviewed at the U.S. Conference of Mayors in Washington D.C. where he was asked about how he felt about the proposal on gun control measures by U.S. president Barack Obama. Leitzell owns a gun himself, but stated "I think it should have been done awhile ago. I believe people should have guns but I also think there are certain guns that certain people don’t need to have.”

In February 2013, it was reported that neither Whaley nor Wagner had chosen to follow Leitzell's suggestion regarding campaign spending. Leitzell stated "Dayton would have been on the national map, media-wise, for doing something so innovative, so creative and so necessary at this moment in time with regard to campaign spending. From my perspective, it was more to do with marketing. It wasn’t to do with winning or losing."

On February 27, 2013, Leitzell participated in a candidates night presentation with five other candidates for mayor, including Whaley and Wagner, as well as three other new names: Derek Foley, Eric Lamont Gregory and Darshawn Romine. His response to the issue of how gun violence could be limited was that he supports the right to bear arms, but suggested that people be required to pay more for access to assault rifles or high-capacity magazines. During the panel, Leitzell pointed out Dayton successes, referring to recent reports of Dayton being "the most affordable city, the happiest city and the third-best city for employment opportunities." In the week leading up to the panel, Nan Waley had conducted a telephone push poll that had angered Leitzell and Wagner regarding "questions they felt misrepresented facts about their past." The poll implied that Leitzell was a racist and that Wagner was corrupt.

On March 13, 2013, it was announced that Leitzell, Whaley and Wagner were the only candidates who had secured the required signatures to earn a spot on the ballot. As the final election for mayor is between two candidates, a runoff was held on May 7, 2013, with the top-two vote getters advancing to the final election in November.

Leitzell was interviewed by Dayton, Ohio radio station WYSO as part of a series of interviews with the candidates in the 2013 primary. Leitzell reiterated his promise regarding campaign spending, discussed those issues which are important to him, and challenges faced by the city. He also fielded a question regarding those who have criticized him for his "part-time" approach to the job of mayor, noting that the role is defined in the city charter as part-time and that he uses social media to respond to questions, but does not carry a cell phone.

Leitzell lost the runoff election, with Whaley securing over 50% of the votes (4,965) and Wagner coming in second with 2,566 votes to Leitzell's 2,338. As such, Leitzell did not appear on the ballot in the November 2013 election and left office at the end of 2013. Leitzell blamed his loss on a lack of understanding by the voters regarding the primary process, but expressed no regrets and pleasure at receiving 23% of the vote, despite spending only $2,000 on campaigning, as opposed to his opponents' respective totals of $264,000 and $100,000. On January 14, 2014, he announced on his blog "This Old Crack House" that he would return to his pastime of renovating his house, a formerly derelict building he had bought in a troubled neighborhood in 2001.

In July 2013, Leitzell pulled petitions to run as an independent for a position on the Montgomery County, Ohio commission. In order to get on the November ballot Leitzell was required to get 1852 valid signatures from registered voters on a petition. Party candidates were required to obtain just 50 signatures. Neither party candidate for the commission seat was opposed in the 2014 primary election. Leitzell submitted some 2900 signatures by the required date, May 5, 2014. He was certified by the Board of Elections as a candidate on May 19, 2014. The final results being that Leitzell came in third place with 9.83% of the vote. In 2015, Leitzell pulled petitions to run for Montgomery County Commission again but this time as a Republican candidate. He would only be required to get 50 valid signatures of Republican or undeclared voters in order to get on the ballot instead of 1492 if he ran as an Independent. He turned in petitions to run against incumbent Judy Dodge as did Don Birdsall, Robert Matthews and Charlotte Mcquire. Realizing that Debbie Lieberman could run unopposed, he withdrew his petition and went out to gather some 100 more signatures and resubmitted a new petition for the other seat. Don Birdsall did the same thing. Don Birdsall was endorsed by the Montgomery County Republican Party and the Ohio Buckeye Firearms association. Leitzell claimed no endorsements. In March 2016 Leitzell won the contested primary with 31444 votes over Birdsall's 29986 votes. Robert Matthews beat the party endorsed candidate as well. Leitzell was the Republican party nominee for Montgomery County Commissioner but was not endorsed by Montgomery County GOP, and did not win this election. Leitzell ran for Dayton mayor in 2021, losing in the primary to Rennes Bowers and Jeff Mims.
