= List of Wright State University people =

This is a list of Wright State University people who have some significant affiliation with the school. Individuals listed may have only attended the university at one point and not necessarily have graduated.

== Faculty ==
- Siva S. Banda – aerospace engineer
- Kenneth N. Beers – NASA physician
- Nikolaos Bourbakis – computer scientist
- Susan Edwards – professor of biology
- John Feldmeier – lawyer and political scientist
- Ronald E. Fox – former president of the American Psychological Association
- Mary Anne Frey – NASA physician
- Pascal Hitzler – computer scientist, founding editor-in-chief of the Semantic Web journal
- Marian Kazimierczuk – electrical engineer
- Andrew Ladis – art historian
- Guozhen Lu – mathematician
- Mary Ellen Mazey – president of Bowling Green State University
- Robert Oelman – NCR president and founder of Wright State
- Terry Oroszi – homeland security researcher and author
- Jerrold S. Petrofsky – physician
- Donna Schlagheck – international politics expert
- Rosalyn Scott – first African-American woman to become a thoracic surgeon
- Vikram Sethi – author and cyber security specialist
- Amit Sheth – computer scientist, Semantic Web expert, and director of kno.e.sis
- D. Harlan Wilson – short-story writer, novelist, and literary critic
- Jonathan Reed Winkler – historian

== Alumni ==
=== Athletics ===
- Brian Anderson – professional baseball player, assistant coach
- Tyler Black – professional baseball player
- Peyton Burdick – professional baseball player
- Bill Edwards – professional basketball player
- Jorge Gurgel – retired professional mixed martial artist
- Bret Jones – professional soccer player
- Frank Lickliter – professional golfer
- Loudon Love – professional basketball player
- Sean Murphy – professional baseball player
- Clay Pickering – former NFL wide receiver; transferred after his freshman season
- Robert Pollard – singer and songwriter
- Vitaly Potapenko – professional basketball player
- Jesse Scholtens – professional baseball player
- Israel Sheinfeld (born 1976) – Israeli basketball player
- Joe Smith – professional baseball player
- Joe Thomasson (born 1993) – basketball player in the Israel Basketball Premier League
- Mike Tracy – soccer coach
- DaShaun Wood – professional basketball player

=== Arts & entertainment ===
- J. Todd Anderson – film storyboard artist
- Jim Baldridge – local news anchor
- Hannah Beachler – motion pictures production designer
- Andrea Bendewald – actress
- Erik Bork – screenwriter
- Deem Bristow – actor
- Joyce Cobb – jazz and blues singer
- Iman Crosson – actor, Obama impersonator, Internet personality
- Jennifer Crusie – romance novelist
- Chitra Banerjee Divakaruni – author
- Dominick Evans – filmmaker and activist
- Mike Gallagher – radio host and political commentator
- Alexis Gomez – singer, American Idol contestant
- Kate Hasting – singer
- Kevin Kramer – screenwriter and television producer
- Eddie McClintock – actor
- Amanda Tori Meating – drag queen
- Kiril Merdzhanski – poet associated with postmodernism
- Robert Pollard – singer and songwriter
- Sara Raasch – author
- Nicole Riegel BA 2009 – filmmaker
- Megan Stalter – comedian, singer, and actress
- Nicole Scherzinger – singer and actress
- Marvell Scott – sportscaster
- Brad Sherwood – actor and comedian
- Jim Van Bebber – film producer
- Tim Waggoner – author
- Chase Whiteside – journalist, documentary filmmaker, and founder of New Left Media

=== Politics ===
- Joyce Beatty – member of the U.S. House of Representatives
- Kevin DeWine – former chairman of the Ohio Republican Party and former member of the Ohio House of Representatives
- Danny O'Connor – politician
- Derrick Seaver – politician
- Arlene Setzer – politician
- Vernon Sykes – politician
- Andrea White – member of the Ohio House of Representatives
- John White – politician

=== Other ===
- Javed Abidi – disability rights activist
- David Albright – founder of Institute for Science and International Security
- Siva S. Banda – aerospace engineer
- Michael R. Barratt – astronaut
- David S. Brown – historian and professor at Elizabethtown College
- Gail J. Brown – research physicist at the Air Force Research Laboratory
- Stephen L. Davis – Air Force major general
- John B. Ellington, Jr. – Air National Guard general
- Shawn Heflick – explorer and adventurer
- Deborah Loewer – retired U.S. Navy rear admiral
- Irene D. Long – chief medical officer at the Kennedy Space Center
- Jerome Pearson – business person
- Richard Scheuring – NASA flight surgeon
- Anthony Shaffer – U.S. Army intelligence officer
- B. N. Singh – director general at IITRAM, professor, IIT Kharagpur

== See also ==
- List of people from Dayton, Ohio
