= List of people from Dayton, Ohio =

The following is a list of people from Dayton, Ohio.

== Actors, entertainers, and models ==
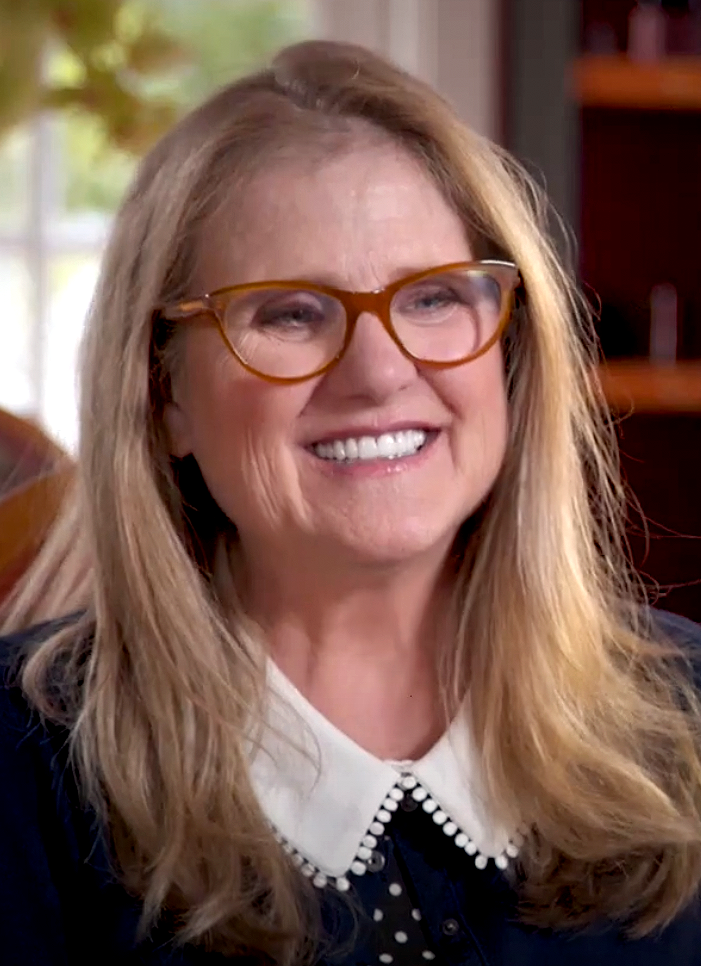
Nancy Cartwright

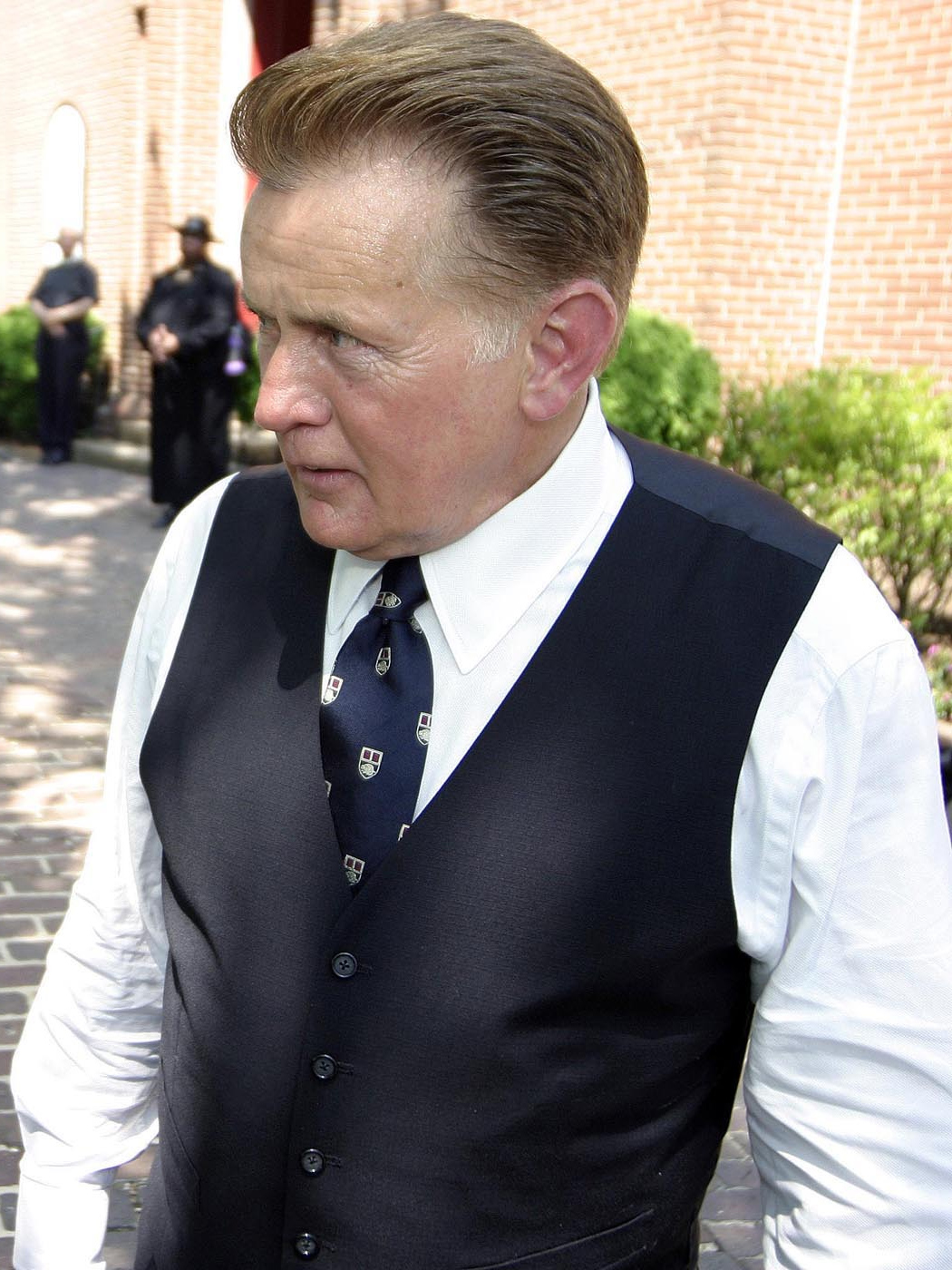
Martin Sheen

- Tom Aldredge (1928–2011), actor
- Ralph Byrd (1909–1952), actor
- Nancy Cartwright (born 1957), voice artist
- Damian Chapa (born 1963), actor
- Max Charles (born 2003), actor
- Mystro Clark (born 1966), actor, comedian, and TV host
- Bing Davis (born 1937), visual artist and teacher
- Charles Michael Davis (born 1984), actor
- Dr. Creep, aka Barry Hobart (1941–2011), actor
- Mel Epstein (1910–1994), film producer
- Dorothy Gish (1898–1968), silent actress
- Luke Grimes (born 1984), actor
- Dorian Harewood (born 1950), actor
- Drew Hastings (born 1954), comedian, actor, writer
- Allison Janney (born 1959), actress
- Ken Jenkins (born 1940), actor
- Toccara Jones (born 1981), fashion model and TV personality
- Gordon Jump (1932–2003), actor
- Chad Lowe (born 1968), actor
- Rob Lowe (born 1964), actor
- Steve Martino (born 1959), film director
- Aaron O'Connell (born 1986), actor
- Maulik Pancholy (born 1974), actor, voice actor, author
- Dan Patrick (born 1957), sports anchor
- Wendy Pepper (1964–2017), reality TV star and fashion designer
- Keith Prentice (1940–1992), actor
- Ted Ross (1934–2002), actor
- Gary Sandy (born 1945), actor
- Sherri Saum (born 1974), actress
- Martin Sheen (born 1940), actor
- Beth Stelling (born 1986), comedian
- Andrea Thompson (born 1960), actress
- Vincent M. Ward (born 1971), actor
- Katt Williams (born 1971), comedian and actor
- De'Angelo Wilson (1979–2008), actor
- Jonathan Winters (1925–2013), comedian and actor

== Athletes ==
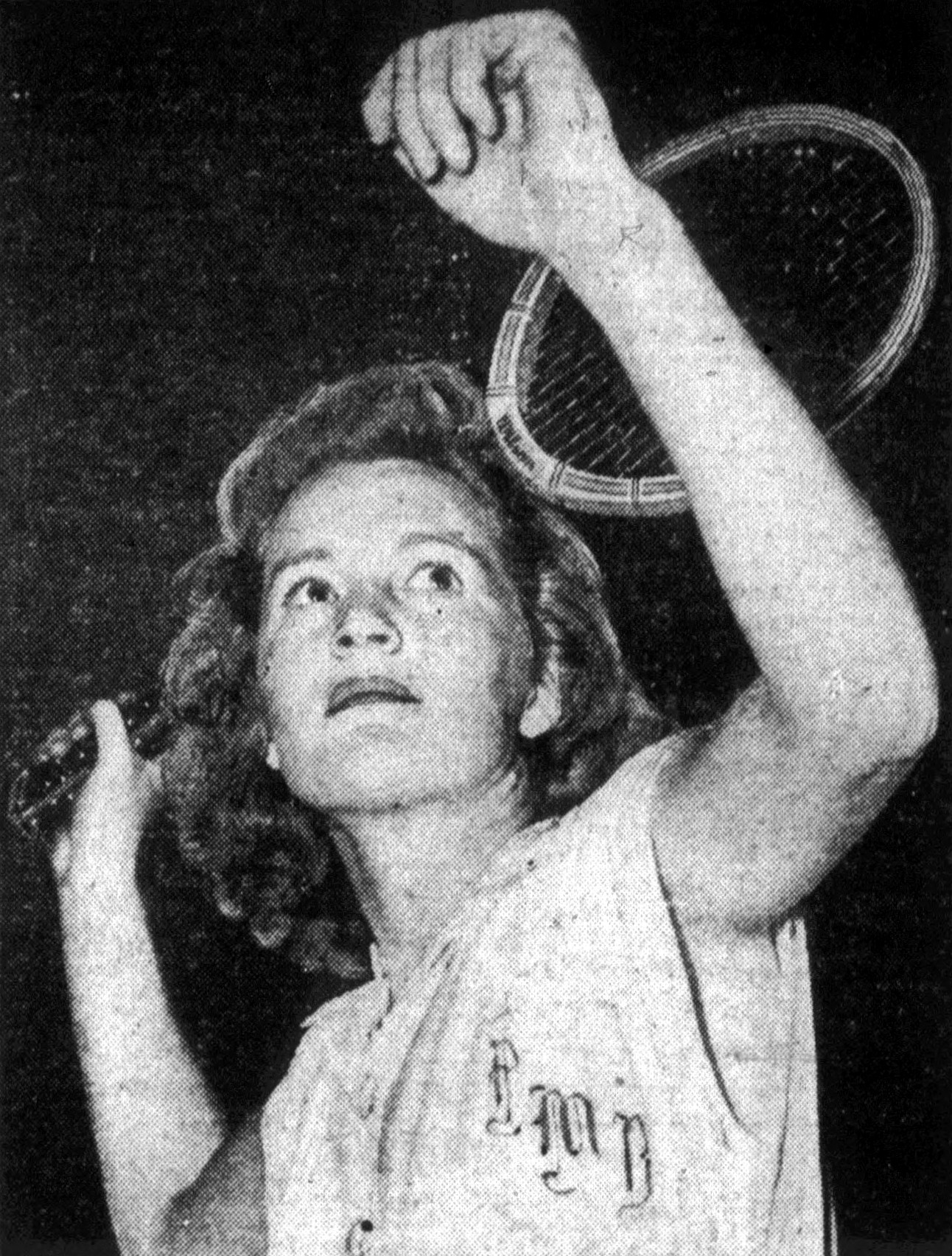
Pauline Betz

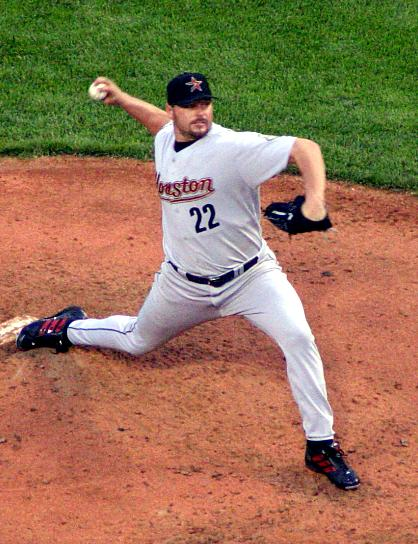
Roger Clemens

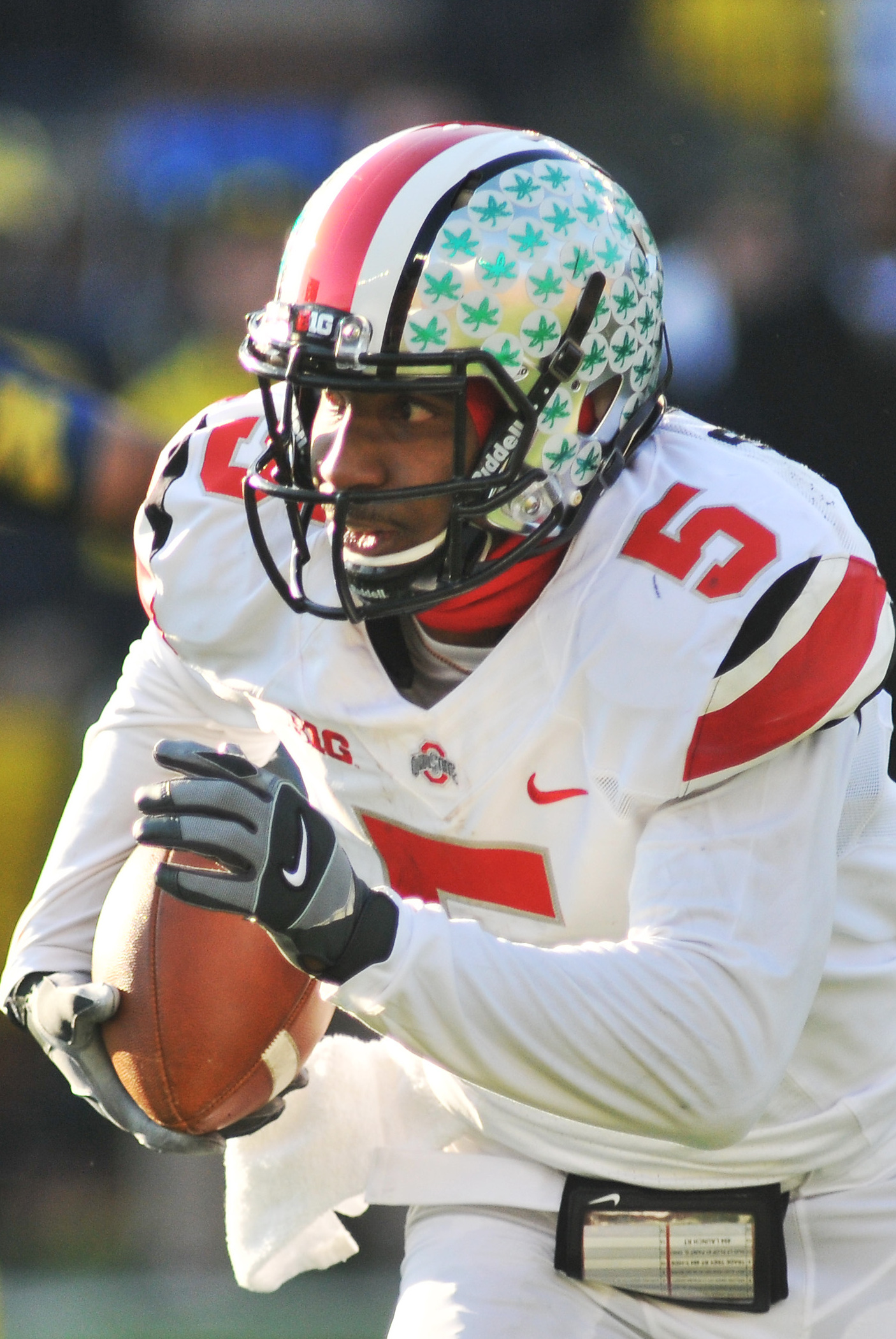
Braxton Miller

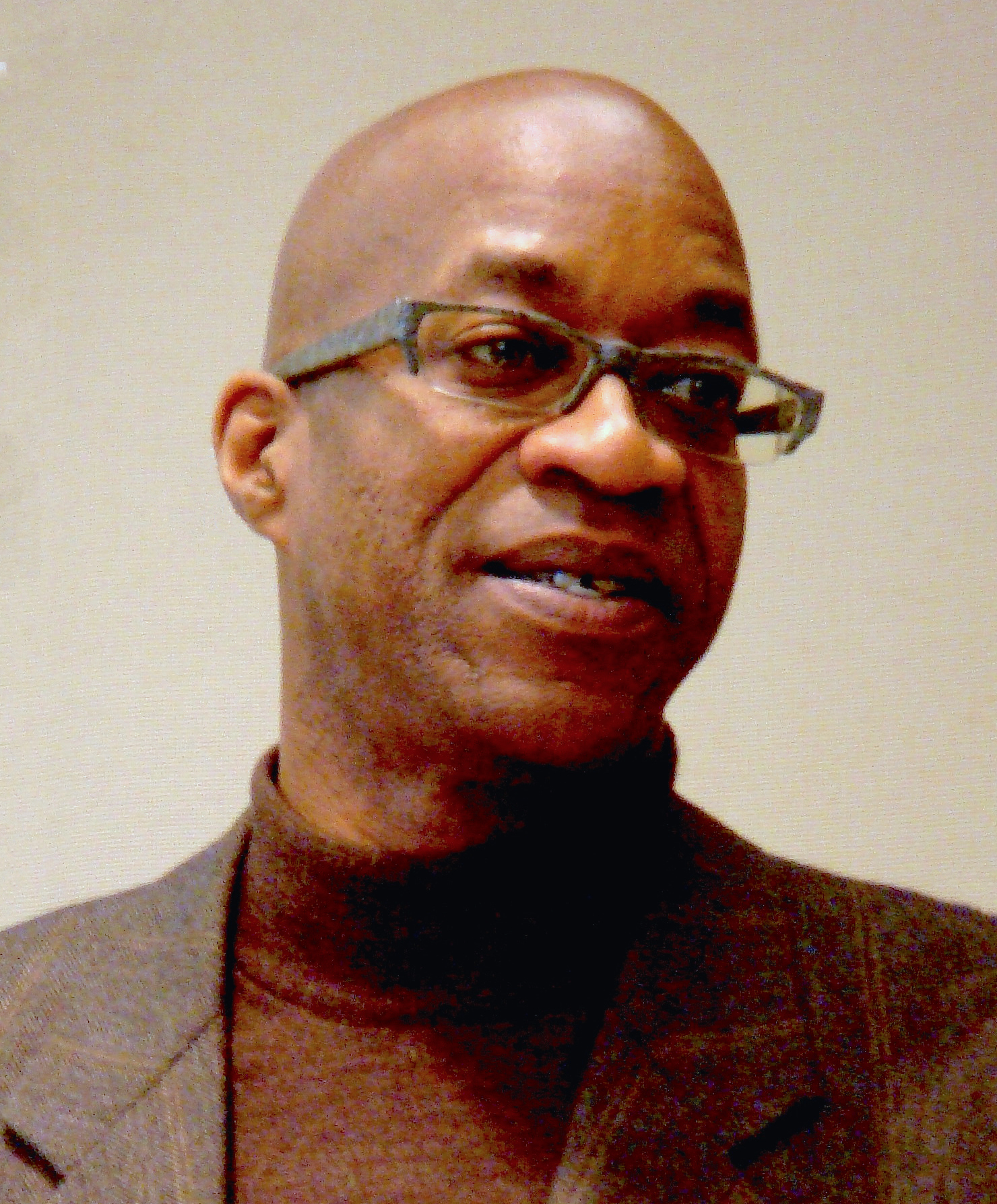
Edwin C. Moses

- Deveon Everhart Aikens (born 1994), pro wrestler
- Will Allen (born 1982), NFL safety
- Michael Bennett (born 1993), NFL defensive tackle
- Pauline Betz (1919–2011), Hall of Fame tennis player, four-time U.S. Open champion
- Howie Brown (1922–1975), NFL guard
- Molly Bruggeman (born 1992), Olympic women's eights rower
- David Bruton (born 1987), NFL strong safety
- Tonja Buford-Bailey (born 1970), Olympic 400m hurdler
- Derek Bunch (born 1961), NFL linebacker
- Keith Byars (born 1963), NFL running back
- Roosevelt Chapman (born 1962), basketball hall of famer and all-time leading scorer at the University of Dayton
- Roger Clemens (born 1962), MLB pitcher
- Stefan Cleveland (born 1994), soccer player
- Norris Cole (born 1988), NBA player
- Kurt Coleman (born 1988), NFL safety
- Marco Coleman (born 1969), NFL defensive tackle
- Cris Collinsworth (born 1959), NFL wide receiver, sports commentator
- Daequan Cook (born 1987), NBA player
- Greg Cook (1946–2012), NFL quarterback
- Charles Daniels (1885–1973), Olympic freestyle swimmer
- Megan Duffy (born 1984), WNBA player
- Rob Dyrdek (born 1974), skateboarder, Alien Workshop
- Claire Falknor (born 1993), professional soccer player
- Doug France (1953–2016), NFL Player
- Nikki Fuller (born 1968), professional bodybuilder
- Na'Shan Goddard (born 1983), NFL offensive lineman
- Jeff Graham (born 1969), NFL receiver
- Joe Greene (born 1967), two-time Olympic bronze medalist long jumper
- Andy Harmon (born 1969), NFL player
- Ron Harper (born 1964), basketball player
- A. J. Hawk (born 1984), NFL linebacker
- Victor Heflin (born 1960), NFL defensive back
- Vince Heflin (born 1959), NFL wide receiver
- John Henderson (born 1943), NFL wide receiver
- Kirk Herbstreit (born 1969), Ohio State quarterback, football analyst
- Chris Hero (born 1979), pro wrestler
- Brady Hoke (born 1958), Ball State University linebacker
- Todd Hollandsworth (born 1973), baseball player
- Bill Hosket Jr. (born 1946), basketball player
- Bill Hosket Sr. (1911–1956), basketball player
- Darrell Jackson (born 1978), NFL wide receiver
- Will Johnson (born 1988), football player
- Kerry Kittles (born 1974), NBA player
- Dave Krynzel (born 1981), MLB player
- Frank Lockhart (1903–1928), race car driver, Indy 500 winner
- Ron Lyle (1941–2011), boxer
- Holley Mangold (born 1989), Olympic weightlifter
- Nick Mangold (1984–2025), NFL offensive lineman
- Justin Masterson (born 1985), baseball pitcher
- Don May (born 1946), NBA player
- Brandon McKinney (born 1983), NFL nose tackle
- Sean McVay (born 1986), NFL head coach
- Mike Mickens (born 1987), NFL defensive back
- Braxton Miller (born 1992), NFL wide receiver
- Mike Mohler (born 1968), baseball pitcher
- Edwin C. Moses (born 1955), Olympic gold medalist hurdler
- Sean Murphy (born 1994), MLB catcher
- Josh Myers (born 1998), NFL center
- Mike Nugent (born 1982), NFL kicker
- Ifeadi Odenigbo (born 1994), NFL defensive end
- Jim Paxson Jr. (born 1957), NBA player and executive
- John Paxson (born 1960), basketball player, coach, manager, broadcaster
- Peerless Price (born 1976), NFL wide receiver
- Scott Rettich (1984–2022), racing driver
- Javon Ringer (born 1987), NFL running back
- Chris Rolfe (born 1983), soccer player
- Brett Salisbury (born 1968), quarterback
- Joe Schilling (born 1984), kickboxer
- Mike Schmidt (born 1949), Hall of Fame baseball player
- Bryan Sellers (born 1982), race car driver
- Donald Smith (born 1951), NBA player
- Scott Stamper (born 1959), NFL running back
- Joe Thomasson (born 1993), basketball player
- Al Tucker, Jr (1943–2001), NBA basketball player
- T. J. Turner (1978–2014), NFL player
- Sam Underhill (born 1996), English rugby union player
- Jared Verse (born 2000), NFL defensive end
- Salt Walther (1947–2012), Indy car driver
- Taylor Ward (born 1993), baseball player
- Dan Wilkinson (born 1973), NFL defensive tackle
- Tamika Williams (born 1980), WNBA player
- Jerel Worthy (born 1990), NFL defensive end
- Chris Wright (born 1988), NBA forward
- Steve Yeager (born 1948), MLB player

== Writers and cartoonists ==
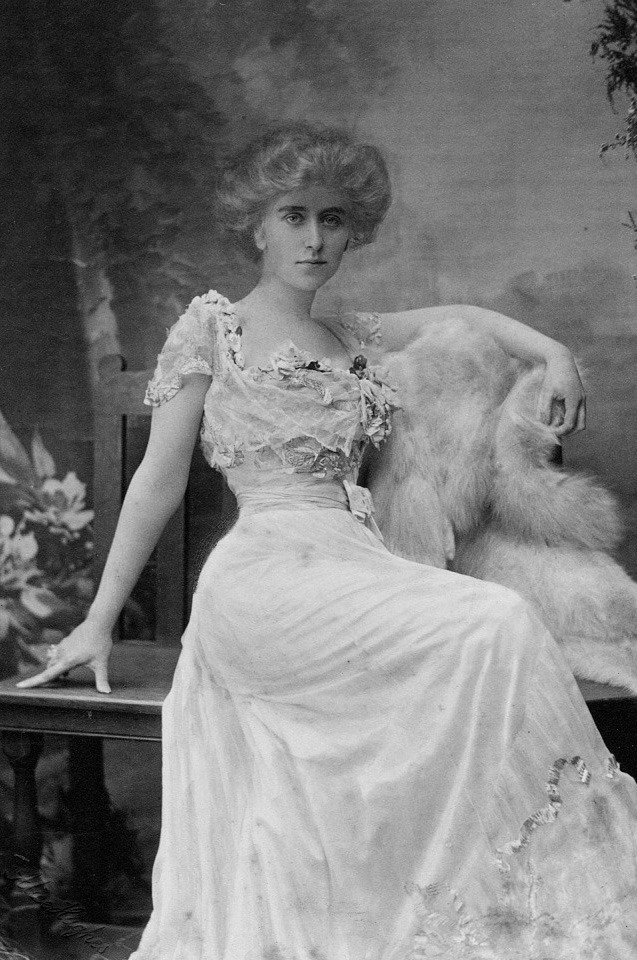
Natalie Clifford Barney

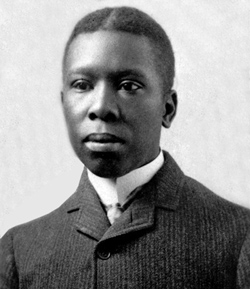
Paul Laurence Dunbar

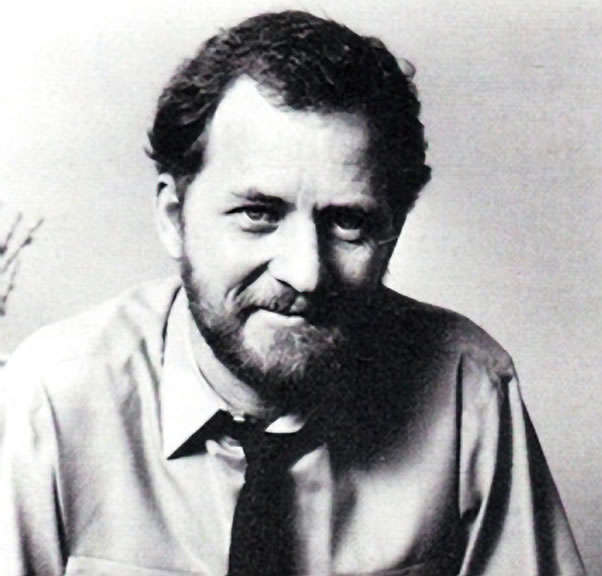
Patrick Nagel

- Natalie Babbitt (1932–2016), author and illustrator
- Natalie Clifford Barney (1876–1972), playwright, poet and novelist
- Eva Best (1851–1925), story writer, poet, music composer, dramatist
- Erma Bombeck (1927–1996), columnist and author
- Richard H. Brodhead (born 1947), author and president of Duke University
- Si Burick (1909–1986), sports editor and columnist
- Milton Caniff (1907–1988), cartoonist
- Ritter Collett (1921–2001), sports editor and columnist
- Charlotte Reeve Conover (1855–1940), historian
- Paul Laurence Dunbar (1872–1906), early African-American poet
- Mike Gallagher (born 1960), political commentators, radio talk show host, non-fiction writer
- Cathy Guisewite (born 1950), cartoonist
- Marj Heyduck (1913–1969), journalist, columnist, editor
- Hunter Lewis (born 1947), author
- Hal McCoy (born 1940), baseball writer
- Patrick Nagel (1945–1984), artist and illustrator
- Terry Oroszi (born 1966), terrorism researcher and author
- Clarence Page (born 1947), journalist and syndicated columnist
- Maulik Pancholy (born 1974), author
- Mike Peters (born 1943), opinion cartoonist
- Robert W. Russell, pen name Nas'Naga (1941–2021), poet and novelist
- Timothy Snyder (born 1969), historian
- Alexandria Constantinova Szeman (fka Sherri Szeman) (born 1956), author
- Tim Waggoner, horror and fantasy writer
- Roz Young (1912–2005), columnist

== Entrepreneurs ==
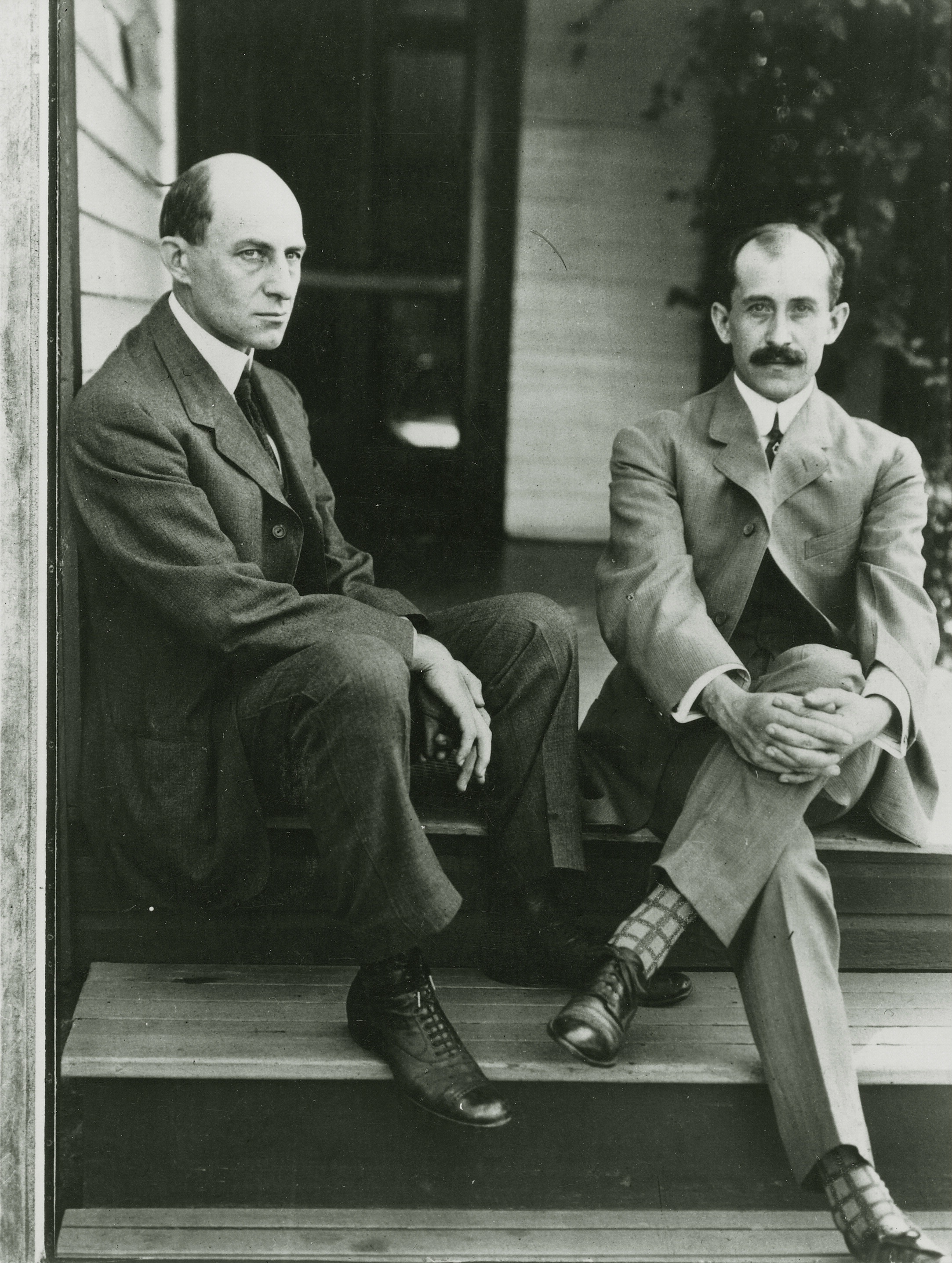
Wilbur and Orville Wright

- Larry Augustin (born 1962), member of the OpenSource community
- Larry Connor (born 1950), founder of the Connor Group
- Edward A. Deeds (1874–1960), engineer, inventor, industrialist
- Philip Haas (1874–1927), inventor, plumbing specialties manufacturer
- George Huffman (1862–1897), founder of Huffy Corporation
- Paul Iams (1915–2004), Iams founder
- Charles Kettering (1876–1958), inventor of the automobile self-starter
- Carl Lindner, Jr. (1919–2011), businessman
- Nancy Lynn (c. 1956–2006), business owner, pilot, flight instructor, and public speaker
- John H. Patterson (1844–1922), founder of National Cash Register
- James Ritty (1836–1918), inventor of the cash register
- Wright brothers, Orville and Wilbur, inventors of the airplane
- Katharine Wright Haskell (1874–1929), suffragist, teacher, sister and assistant of the Wright brothers

== Military ==
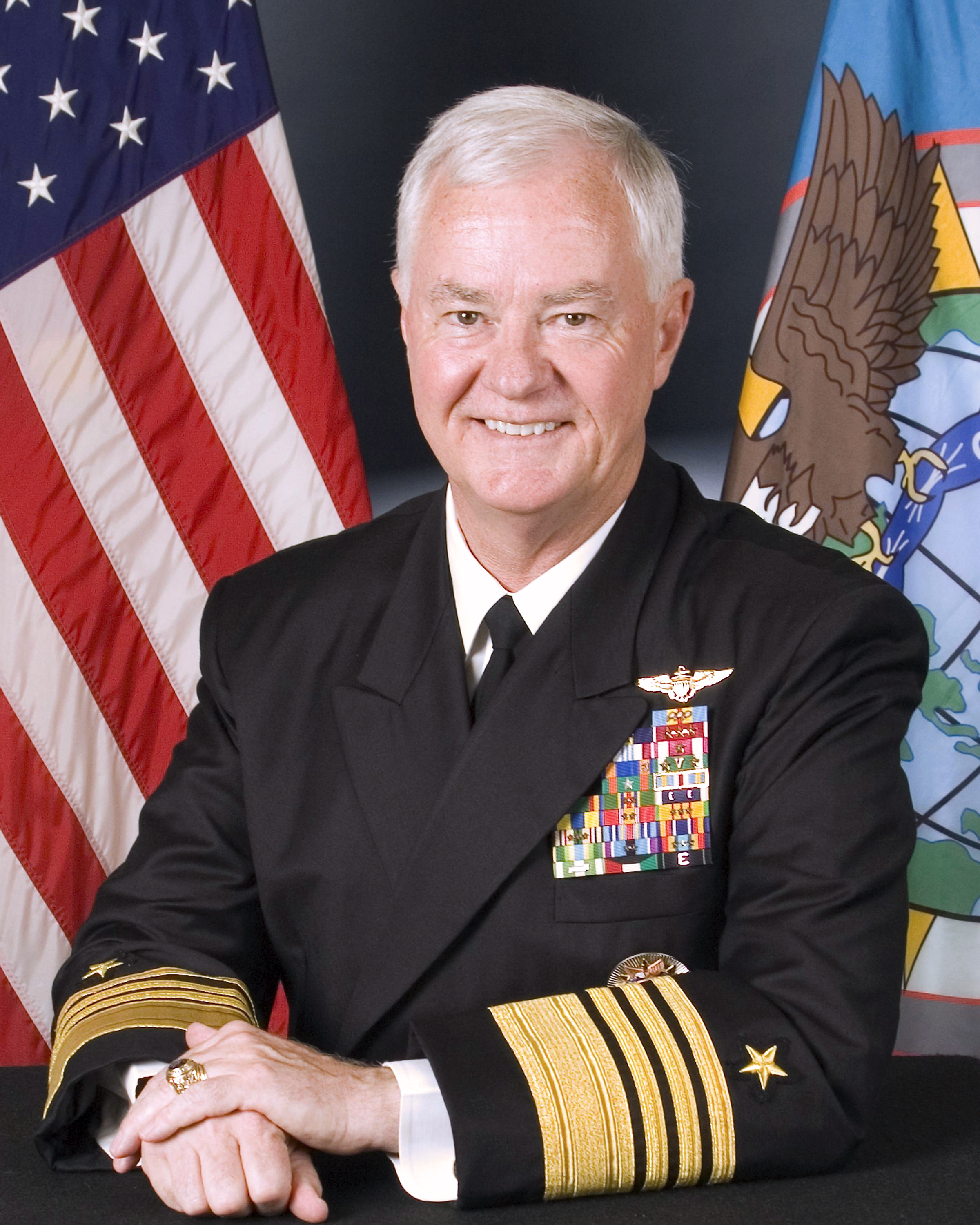
Admiral Timothy J. Keating

- Charles G. Bickham (1867–1944), Medal of Honor recipient
- Llewellyn Morris Chilson (1920–1981), United States Army career soldier who served during World War II
- Richard E. Cole (1915–2019), Air Force pilot who took part in the Doolittle Raid in 1942
- Sammy L. Davis (born 1946), Medal of Honor recipient
- Admiral Timothy J. Keating (born 1948), commander of the United States Pacific Command
- Joseph G. Lapointe Jr (1948–1969), Medal of Honor recipient
- Jack V. Mackmull (1927–2011), founded the United States Army Aviation Branch
- Joe C. Paul (1946–1965), Medal of Honor recipient
- Sidney Souers (1892–1973), first director of the CIA
- Tony Stein (1921–1945), Medal of Honor recipient

== Musicians ==
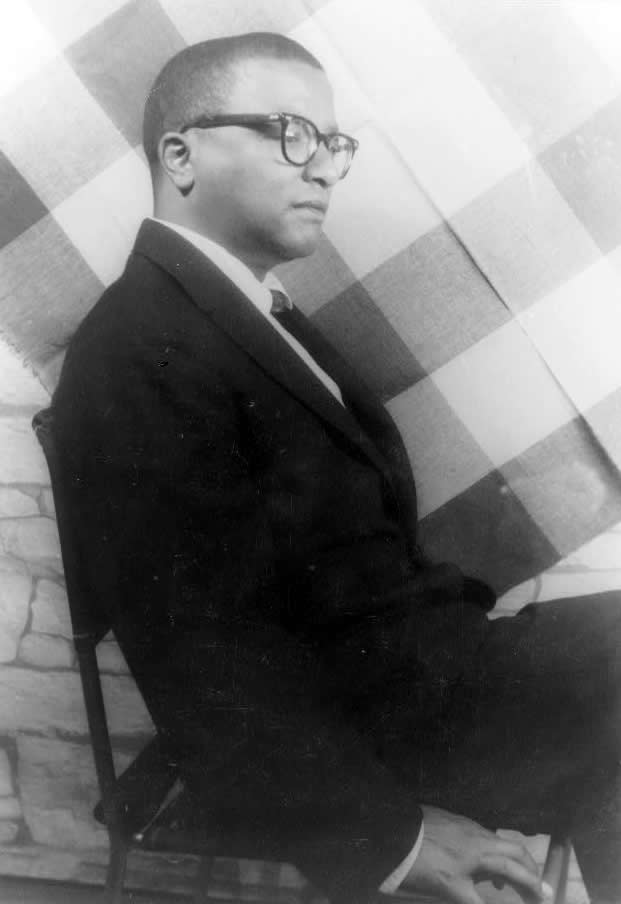
Billy Strayhorn

- Little Axe (born 1949), blues musician
- Leroy Bonner (1943–2013), musician/producer, The Ohio Players
- Stevie Brock (born 1990), pop singer
- Kelley Deal (born 1961), rock musician, member of The Breeders and The Kelley Deal 6000
- Kim Deal (born 1961), rock musician, member of Pixies, The Amps, and The Breeders
- Rick Derringer (born 1947), rock musician
- Jim Ferguson (born 1948), classical/jazz guitarist, composer, author, educator, and music journalist
- Tommy James (born 1947), rock musician and singer of "Mony Mony"
- Walter "Junie" Morrison (1954–2017), musician and producer
- Vess Ossman (1868–1923), 5-string banjoist
- Dottie Peoples (born 1950), gospel singer
- M Ross Perkins (born 1987), songwriter
- Robert Pollard (born 1957), founder and singer of lo-fi rock band Guided By Voices
- Harry Reser (1896–1965), banjoist and leader of the Clicquot Club Eskimos
- Kim Richey (born 1956), singer/songwriter
- John Scofield (born 1951), jazz guitarist
- John Schmersal, guitarist/singer for Brainiac, who went on to form Enon
- Bud Shank (1926–2009), jazz saxophonist
- Margo Smith (1939–2024), country music singer, known for her yodeling
- Tyler Smith (born 1986), singer (The Word Alive)
- Billy Strayhorn (1915–1967), jazz composer, pianist, lyricist, and arranger
- Roger Troutman (1951–1999) and Zapp, musicians/producers
- Johnnie Wilder Jr. (1949–2006), founder and lead singer, and Keith Wilder, founder, Heatwave, R&B group
- Daniel Williams (1985–2025), drummer and co-founder of metalcore band The Devil Wears Prada
- Booty Wood (1919–1987), jazz trombonist
- Snooky Young (1919–2011), jazz trumpeter

== Politicians ==
James Cox

- Dave Albritton (1913–1994), former Ohio state representative
- Dixie Allen (1935–2019), former Ohio state representative
- Joyce Beatty (born 1950), U.S. representative for Ohio
- Willis Blackshear Jr. (born 1993), Ohio state representative
- Frederick Bowers (1909–1973), former Ohio state representative
- James Middleton Cox (1870–1957), congressman, Ohio governor, 1920 Democratic presidential candidate, founder of Cox Enterprises
- Richard Clay Dixon (born 1941), former mayor of Dayton
- Dave Hall (1906–1977), former mayor of Dayton
- Tony P. Hall (born 1942), former US congressman
- William A. Halteman (1860–1945), member of the Washington House of Representatives 1895–1897 and 1907–1909
- Paul Leonard (born 1943), former mayor of Dayton and lieutenant governor of Ohio
- Clayton Luckie (born 1963), former Ohio state representative
- James H. McGee (1918–2006), former mayor of Dayton
- C. J. McLin (1921–1988), former Ohio state representative
- Rhine McLin (born 1948), former mayor of Dayton, former Ohio state representative, former Ohio senator
- Jeffrey J. Mims Jr. (born 1947), former mayor of Dayton
- Vipal J. Patel (born 1967 or 1968), acting US attorney for the Southern District of Ohio
- Tom Roberts (born 1952), former Ohio state representative, former Ohio senator
- Mike Rohrkaste (born 1958), Wisconsin state assemblyman and businessman
- Fred Strahorn (born 1965), former Ohio state representative, former Ohio Senator
- Mike Turner (born 1960), US congressman, former mayor of Dayton
- Clement Vallandigham, lawyer and politician who served as the leader of the Copperheads (1820–1871)

== Other ==
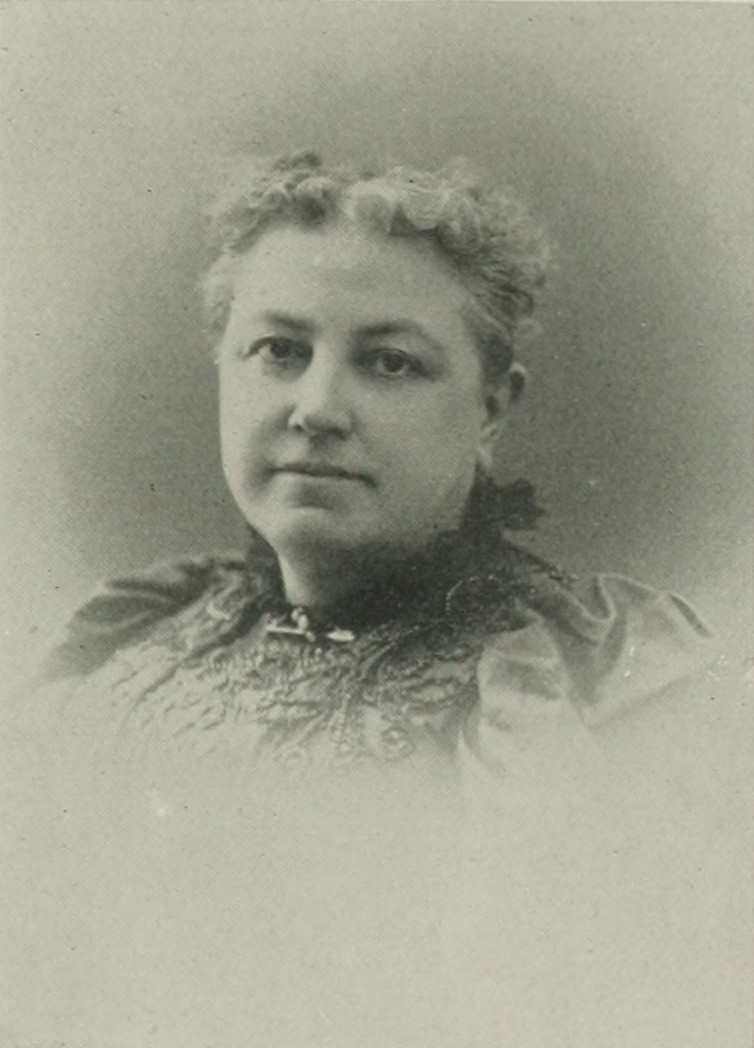
Alice E. Heckler Peters

- Jordan Anderson (1825–1907), former slave and author of "Letter from a Freedman to His Old Master"
- China P. Arnold (born 1980), convicted murderer
- Charles Bassett (1931–1966), astronaut
- Jayananda Dasa (1939–1977), pioneer of ISKCON in San Francisco
- Phil Donahue (1935–2024), talk-show host, began his eponymous show in Dayton, where he spent over a decade
- Derrick L. Foward (born 1968), NAACP Image Award Winning civil rights activist
- Ronnie and Donnie Galyon (1951–2020), oldest set of conjoined twins in the world
- Steve Gibson (born 1955), computer programmer
- Jessie Gooding (born 1926), civil rights activist
- George J. Graham, Jr. (1938–2006), political theorist
- Ahad Israfil (1972–2019), gunshot victim
- Virginia Kettering (1907–2003), philanthropist
- William H. Lough (1881–1940s), economist
- W. S. McIntosh (1921–1974), civil rights activist
- Jessica Moore (born 1982), journalist
- Robert R. Nathan, economist
- Mike Nawrocki (born 1966), co-creator of VeggieTales
- Melvin Lorrel Nichols (1894–1981), emeritus professor of chemistry, Cornell University
- Alice E. Heckler Peters (1845–1921), social reformer
- Jane Reece (1868–1961), photographer
- Amy Schneider (born 1979), Jeopardy! champion, and the first openly transgender contestant to qualify for the Tournament of Champions
- Constantine Scollen (1841–1902), renowned Irish missionary and "Whoop-Up Trail" priest among the native peoples of Canada and US
- Howard Dwight Smith (1886–1958), architect of Ohio Stadium
- Dorothy Stang (1931–2005), Catholic nun of the Sisters of Notre Dame de Namur and Amazonian activist
- Norman Steenrod (1910–1971), mathematician
- Strobe Talbott (born 1946), writer and diplomat
- Perry Yaney (1931–2025), physicist

== See also ==
- List of University of Dayton people
- List of Wright State University people
