= List of University of Dayton people =

This is a list of University of Dayton people who have some significant affiliation with the school. Individuals listed may have only attended the university at one point and not necessarily have graduated.

== Alumni ==
=== Athletics ===
- David Abidor '13 - soccer player
- Lalas Abubakar - soccer player for Colorado Rapids
- Sneeze Achiu '27 - first Asian and first Native Hawaiian American football player in the NFL
- Jerry Blevins - MLB pitcher
- Bucky Bockhorn '58 - former NBA player
- Koby Brea - NBA player for Phoenix Suns
- Toumani Camara '23 - NBA player for Portland Trail Blazers
- Bob DeMarco '59 - former NFL player, All-Pro center for St. Louis Cardinals
- Fred Dugan '57 - former NFL player
- Gerry Faust '58 - head football coach at the University of Notre Dame
- Anthony Grant '87 - current University of Dayton men's basketball coach
- Jon Gruden '86 - Super Bowl-winning head coach (2002) of the Tampa Bay Buccaneers; former Las Vegas Raiders head coach
- Mike Hauschild - pitcher, Texas Rangers
- Chris Johnson '12 - NBA player, Utah Jazz, player in the Israeli Basketball Premier League
- Emil Karas '58 - former NFL player
- Jim Katcavage '56 - All-Pro defensive tackle for the NFL New York Giants
- Ally Malott '15 - WNBA player
- Don May '68 - professional basketball player 1968–1975
- Don Meineke '52 - former NBA player 1952-1958 and First NBA Rookie of the Year
- Chuck Noll '53 - four-time Super Bowl winning head coach (Pittsburgh Steelers 1975, 1976, 1979, 1980; inducted into the Pro Football Hall of Fame in 1993)
- Dan Patrick '79 - sportscaster with NBC Sports
- Brian Roberts '08 - NBA player, Charlotte Hornets
- Dasan Robinson - professional soccer player
- Chris Rolfe '05 - professional soccer player; also played on United States Men's National Soccer Team in 2005
- Vincent Sanford (born 1990) - basketball player for Hapoel Galil Elyon of the Israeli Basketball Premier League
- Devon Scott '15 - basketball player in the Israel Basketball Premier League
- Brandon Staley - former Los Angeles Chargers head coach
- Craig Stammen - pitcher, Washington Nationals and San Diego Padres
- Obi Toppin - NBA player, Indiana Pacers
- Adam Trautman '20 - NFL player, tight end for Denver Broncos
- Chris Wright '11 - professional basketball player

=== Arts & entertainment ===
- Chip Bok '74 - two-time National Cartoonist Society (NCS) editorial cartoonist of the year
- Erma Bombeck '49 - humorist and newspaper columnist
- Bruce Graham - architect of the Willis Tower (formerly Sears Tower)
- Don Novello (stage name Father Guido Sarducci) '64 - actor, writer and comedian
- James Oliver - first Black graduate of University of Mississippi Medical Center
- Amy Schneider - Jeopardy! champion with the second longest winning streak

=== Politics ===
- Michael B. Coleman (JD '80) - first African-American mayor of Columbus, Ohio
- Tom Demmer '08 - member of the Illinois House of Representatives
- Ray Gricar - district attorney of Centre County, Pennsylvania
- Jon Husted '89, '93 (MA) - Ohio lieutenant governor (2019–2025), U.S. senator from Ohio (2025–present)
- Bob Schaffer '84 - U.S. congressman from Colorado
- David Taylor (J.D.) - member of the U.S. House of Representatives from Ohio's 2nd congressional district
- Mike Turner '92 (graduate of Business School) - member of the U.S. House of Representatives from Ohio's 10th congressional district
- Charles W. Whalen, Jr. '42 - U.S. congressman from Ohio's 3rd congressional district (1967–1979), author
- Nan Whaley '98 - politician, mayor of Dayton
- Hasna Jasimuddin Moudud '69- former member of Parliament of Bangladesh (1986-1990) & spouse of the Prime Minister of Bangladesh (1988-1989).
- Annie Andrews '98 (BS) -US Senator-elect from South Carolina

=== Other ===
- David J. Bradley '71 - inventor of the "Control-Alt-Delete" computer keyboard command
- Erica Chenoweth '02 - Frank Stanton Professor of the First Amendment at the Harvard Kennedy School
- Joseph Desch '26 - creator of decoding machine to crack Nazi Enigma code in World War II
- Michael Eismann '04 - IEEE fellow and chief scientist at the Air Force Research Laboratory
- Theresa Flores - sex-trafficking activist
- Mike Gallagher - political commentator, radio talk show host, writer
- Jessie Scott Hathcock '30 - first female African American graduate; humanitarian, educator, and civil rights leader
- Socorro Hernandez-Bernasconi - teacher and activist
- Kristina Keneally '91 - first female premier of New South Wales
- Bill Klesse '81 - CEO of Valero Energy
- Omar J. Marrero - secretary of state of Puerto Rico
- Scott Douglas Miller - president of Virginia Wesleyan University, former president of Bethany College, Wesley College, and Lincoln Memorial University
- Charles J. Pedersen '26 - winner of 1987 Nobel Prize in Chemistry
- Richard Rohr - Franciscan, mystic, speaker
- Richard Schoen '72 - Wolf Prize in Mathematics winner for "striking contributions to analysis and geometry"
- Jerry Sharkey '65 - historic preservationist and Wright brothers historian, conceived idea for Dayton Aviation Heritage National Historical Park

== Faculty ==
- Bob Taft - distinguished research associate in the School of Education; former two-term governor of Ohio; great-grandson of President Taft
- Perry Yaney - fellow of the American Physical Society

== See also ==
- List of people from Dayton, Ohio
