= Klesse =

Klesse is a surname. Notable people with the surname include:

- Bill Klesse, Chairman and CEO of Valero Energy Corporation
- William R. Klesse (born 1947), American businessman
