= Madonna of humility =

Artistic subject

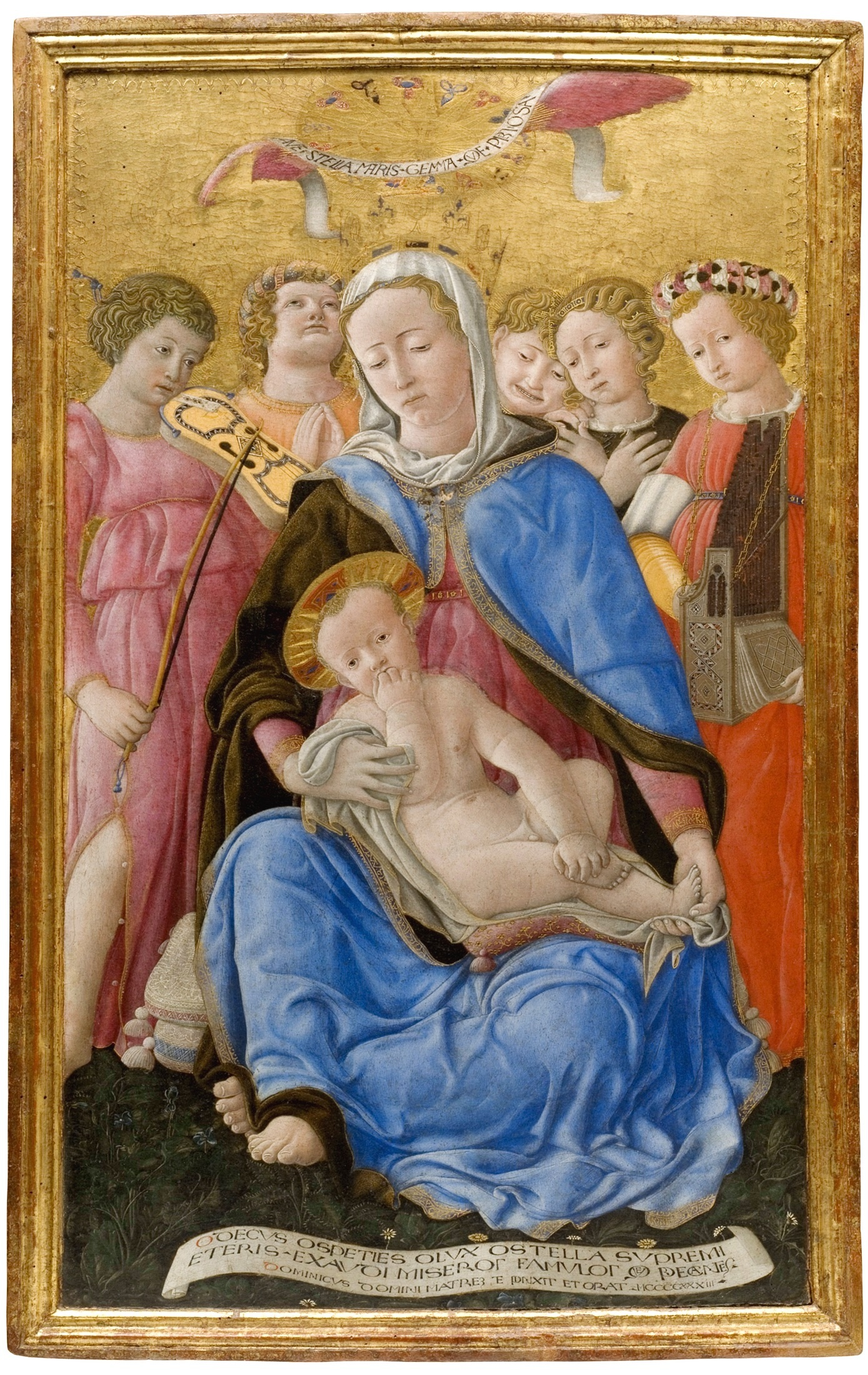
Madonna of Humility by Domenico di Bartolo, 1433.

A Madonna of humility or Virgin of humility is a depiction in art of the Virgin Mary sitting on the ground, or upon a low cushion. She usually holds the Christ Child in her lap, making it one form of the Madonna and Child. The iconography originated in the 14th century, and was most common in that and the following century.

Initially mostly using a gold ground style, when painted backgrounds came to be preferred in the 15th century, this pose is very common in images of the Virgin in a hortus conclusus or "enclosed garden", where the Virgin often sits on the flowery grass.

== History and development ==
Humility is a virtue extolled by Saint Francis of Assisi, and this iconography was associated with Franciscan piety, although it was not the creation of the Franciscans, since the artist first associated with the image, Simone Martini, had ties with the Dominicans and may have created the image for them. The word humility derives from the Latin humus, meaning earth or ground.

The earliest known painting of this type dates to 1346 and is at the Museo Nazionale in Palermo. It represents a Madonna seated on a small cushion just above the ground. The Christ Child partially looks at the viewer. The painting bears the inscription Nostra Domina de Humilitate, with the low cushion intended to express her humility. This painting in Palermo is, however, of a somewhat mediocre quality and was perhaps based on a work of Simone Martini. There is a similar painting in the Gemäldegalerie, Berlin, and both paintings were probably based on a Madonna of humility by Martini. A Virgin of humility fresco by Simone Martini survives in the Palais des Papes in Avignon, France.

An altar was dedicated to the Madonna of Humility, understood as a title, in the church of Santa Maria Novella in Florence in 1361. This style of painting spread quickly through Italy and by 1375 examples began to appear in Spain, France and Germany. It was the most popular among the depictions of the early Trecento artistic period.

== Examples ==
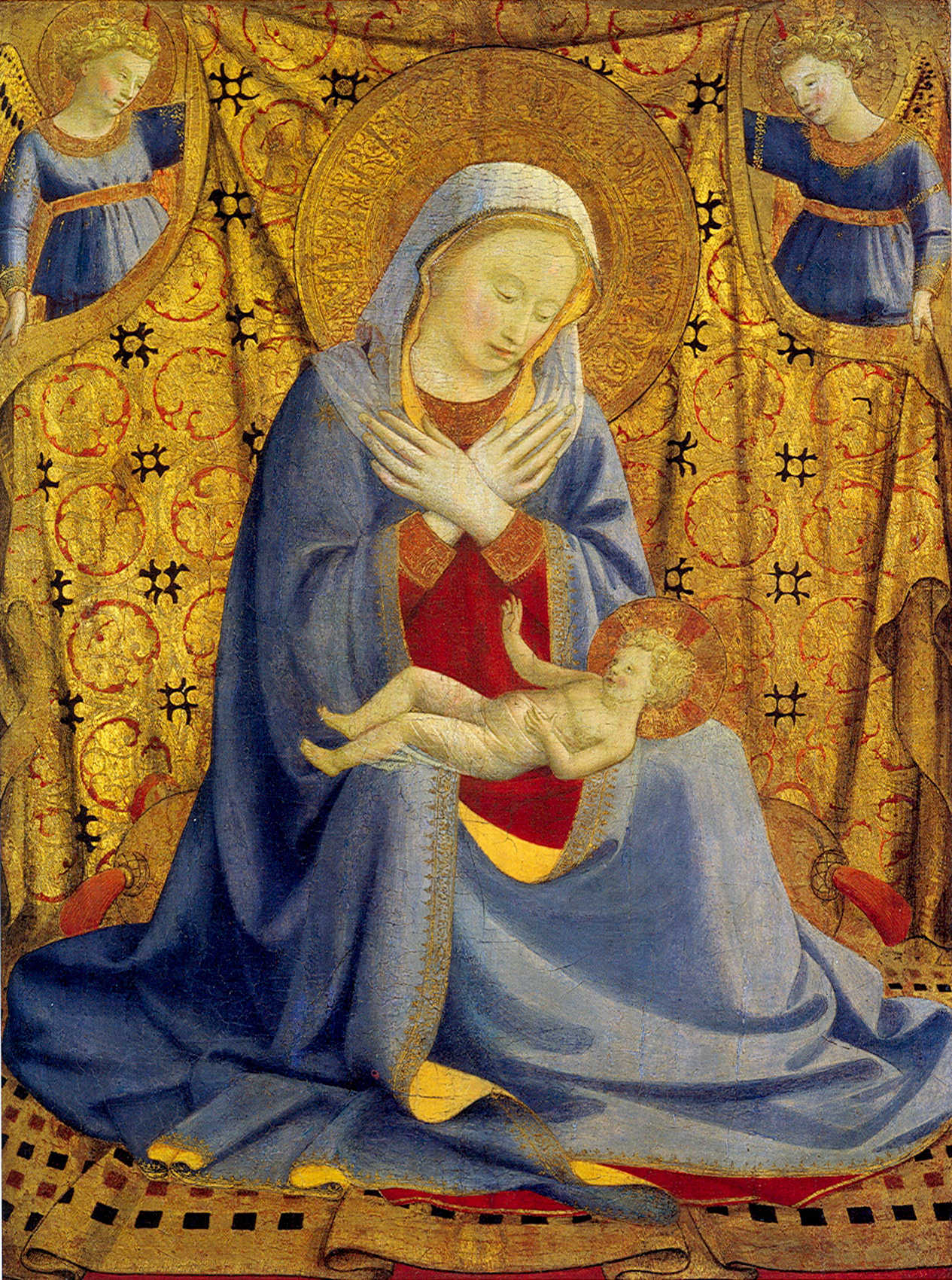
Fra Angelico, c. 1430.

Domenico di Bartolo's Madonna of Humility, painted in 1433, was described by art historian Andrew Ladis as one of the most innovative devotional images of the early Renaissance. The formal symmetry of the strips below her feet and those hovering above her symbolize the harmony of her human nature and status as an earthly woman, with her heavenly queenship. Despite the low seating position, the star and the gems as well as the halo signify her regal status. In this painting, which is at the Pinoteca Nazionale in Siena, Domenico did not use cast shadows as he did in other works such as the Madonna Enthroned.

Filippo Lippi's Madonna of Humility, painted between 1431 and 1437, is also an important work and illustrates Lippi's early style, when he was attentive to Masaccio's use of large and round figures. It was painted during a period when Lippi had dropped out of sight, and had perhaps gone into exile with Cosimo de' Medici.

A miracle attributed to the fresco of the Madonna of Humility painted in circa 1370 gave rise to the construction of the Basilica of Our Lady of Humility in Pistoia, Tuscany, Italy. The fresco is sometimes attributed to Giovanni di Bartolomeo Cristiani, but was perhaps done by a local painter from Pistoia. The Basilica, built by architect Ventura Vitoni, is an important example of high Renaissance architecture. Giorgio Vasari built the octagonal dome atop the Basilica in 1562. The original fresco remains within the Basilica.

Other key examples include Bernardo Daddi's central panel in the De Carlo Triptych in which the Madonna is shown sitting in a very low chair, rather than on a cushion. Fra Angelico's representation of about 1430 (which includes two angels) is notable in that Jesus is approached from above, focusing on his divinity. Giovanni di Paolo's depiction of about 1456 (see gallery below) represents a transition in the perception of nature, with the visual landscape forming itself around the seated Madonna.

== Feast ==
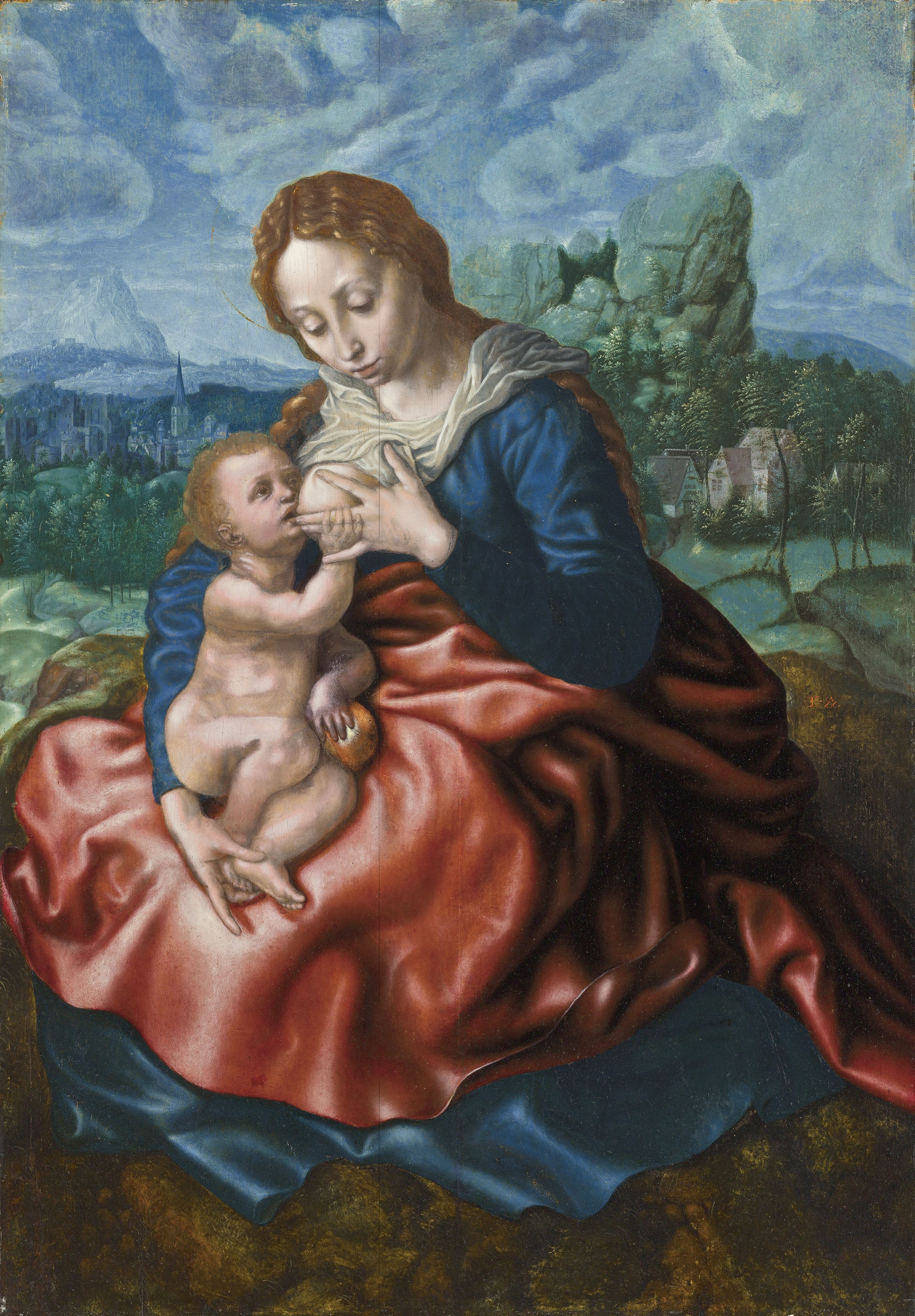
Jan Sanders van Hemessen, mid-16th century.

The feast of the Humility of the Blessed Virgin Mary was on July 17. It was included in the General Roman Calendar of 1954 among the feasts pro aliquibus locis (in some places), but was removed from the General Roman Calendar of 1960.

Upon the election of Pope Francis in 2013, Russian Orthodox Bishop Hilarion Alfeyev gifted an icon of Our Lady of Humility, which the Roman Pontiff accepted; then donated to Pope Emeritus Benedict XVI during their farewell meeting at Castel Gandolfo.

== Gallery ==
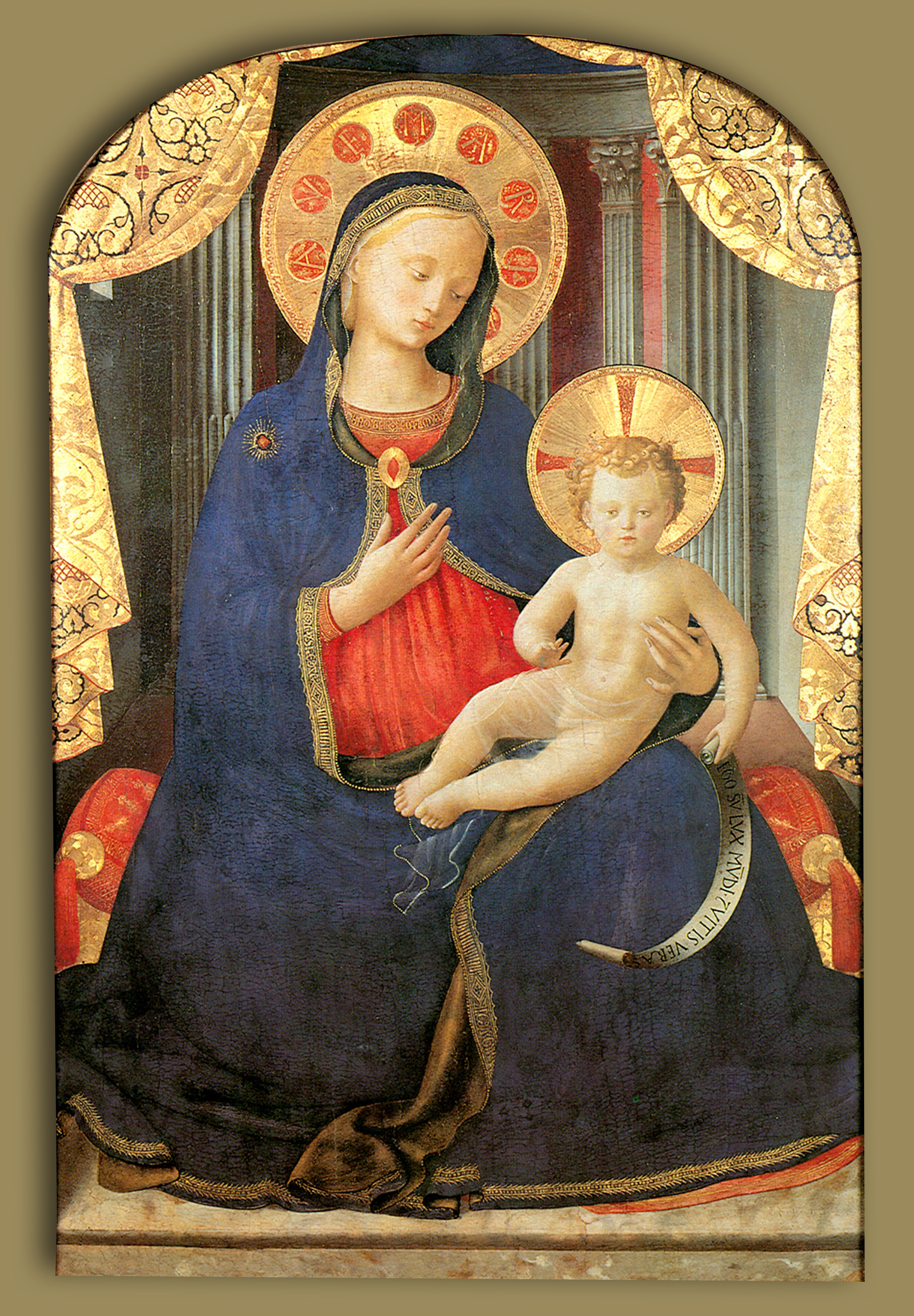
Fra Angelico, c. 1430.

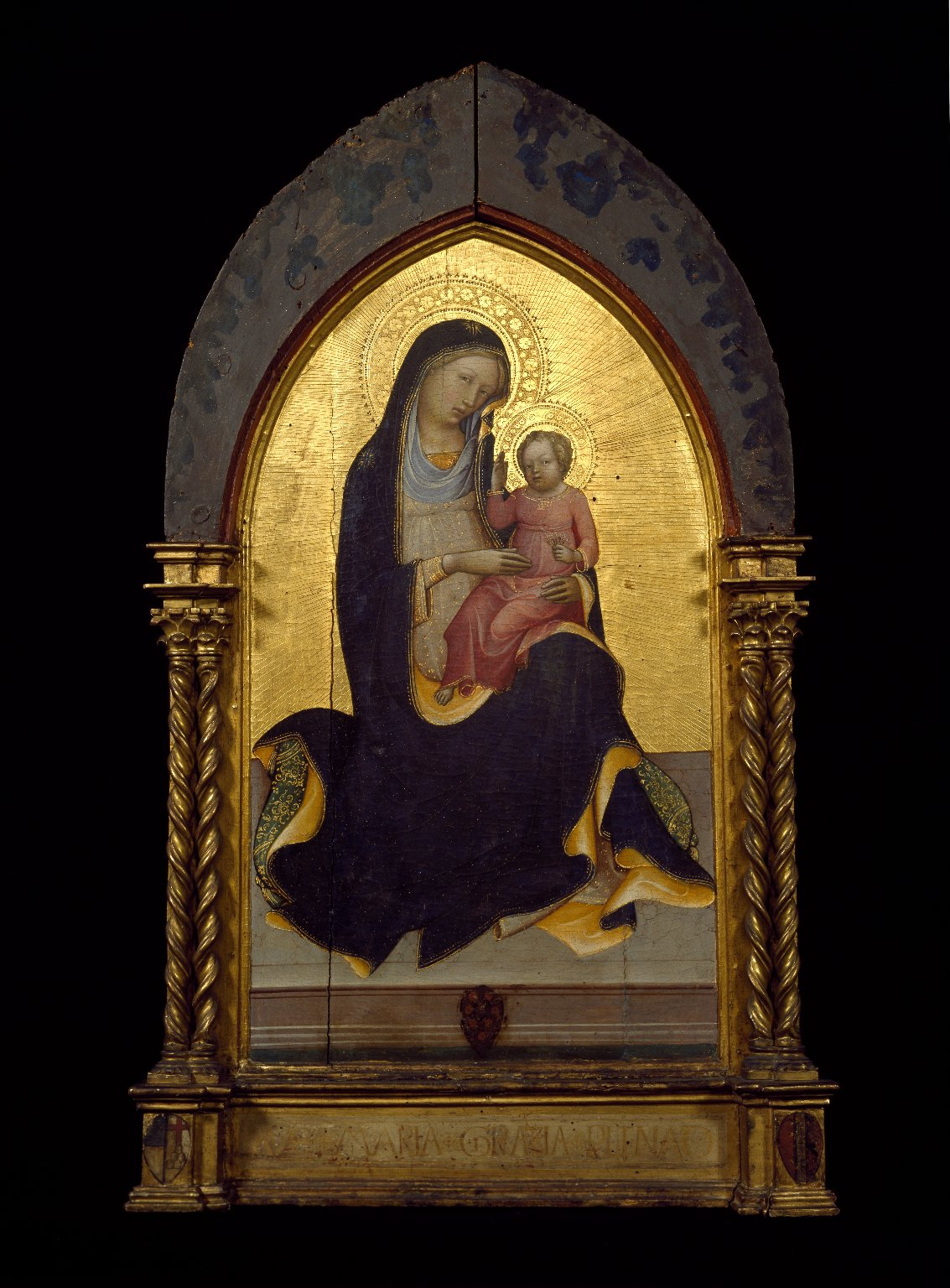
Lorenzo Monaco, c. 1410

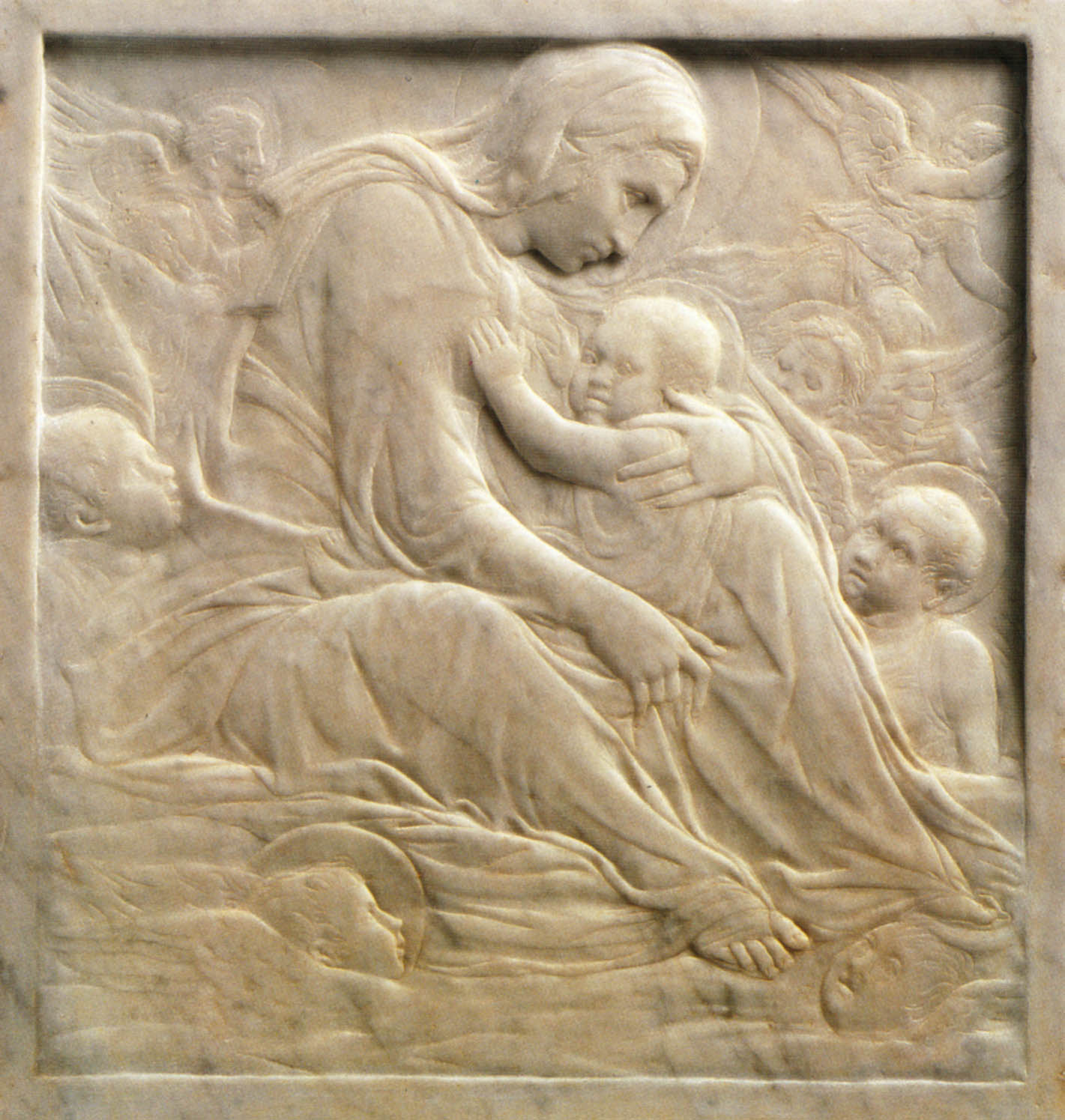
Donatello, low relief in marble, 1420s

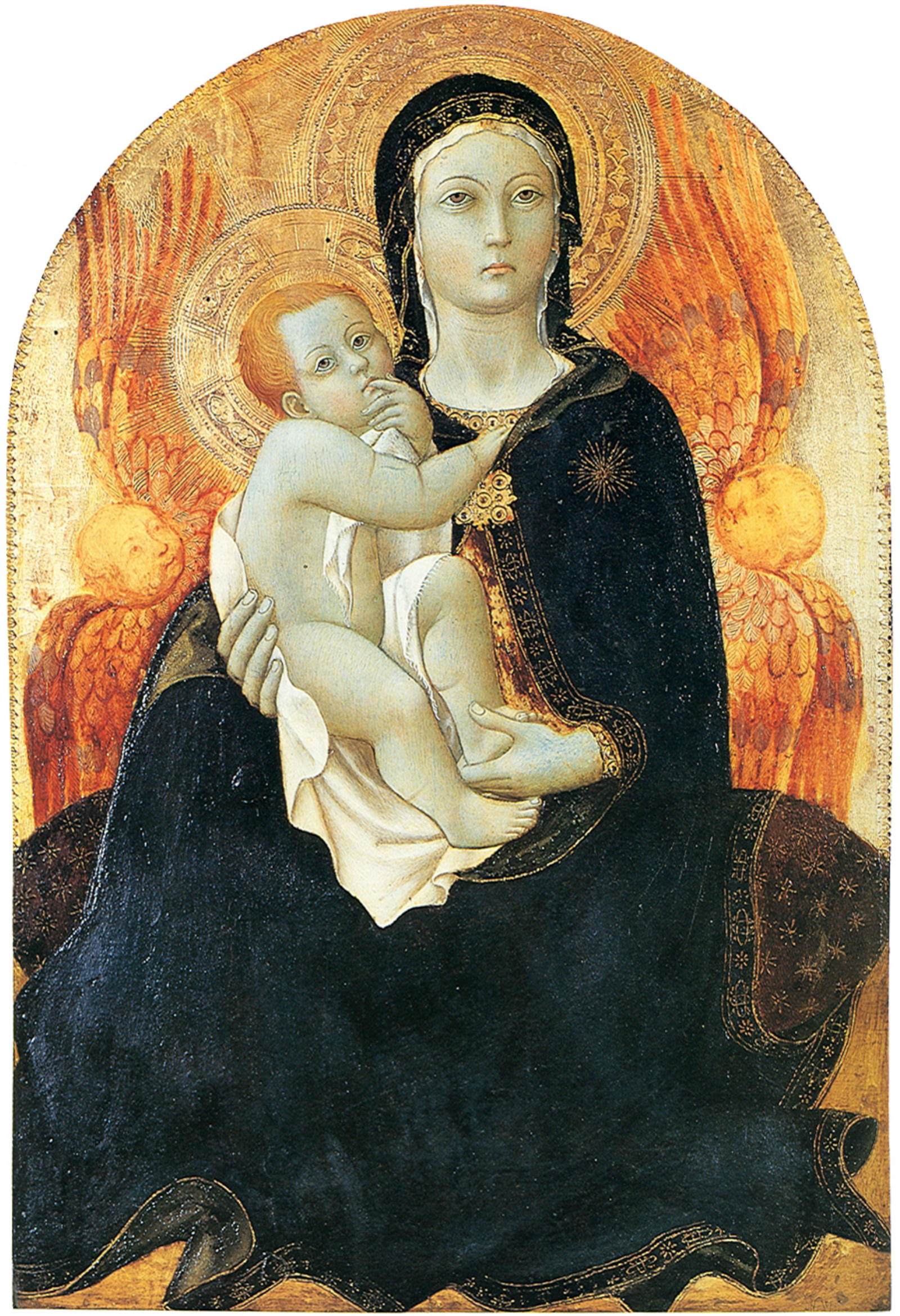
Sano di Pietro c. 1440

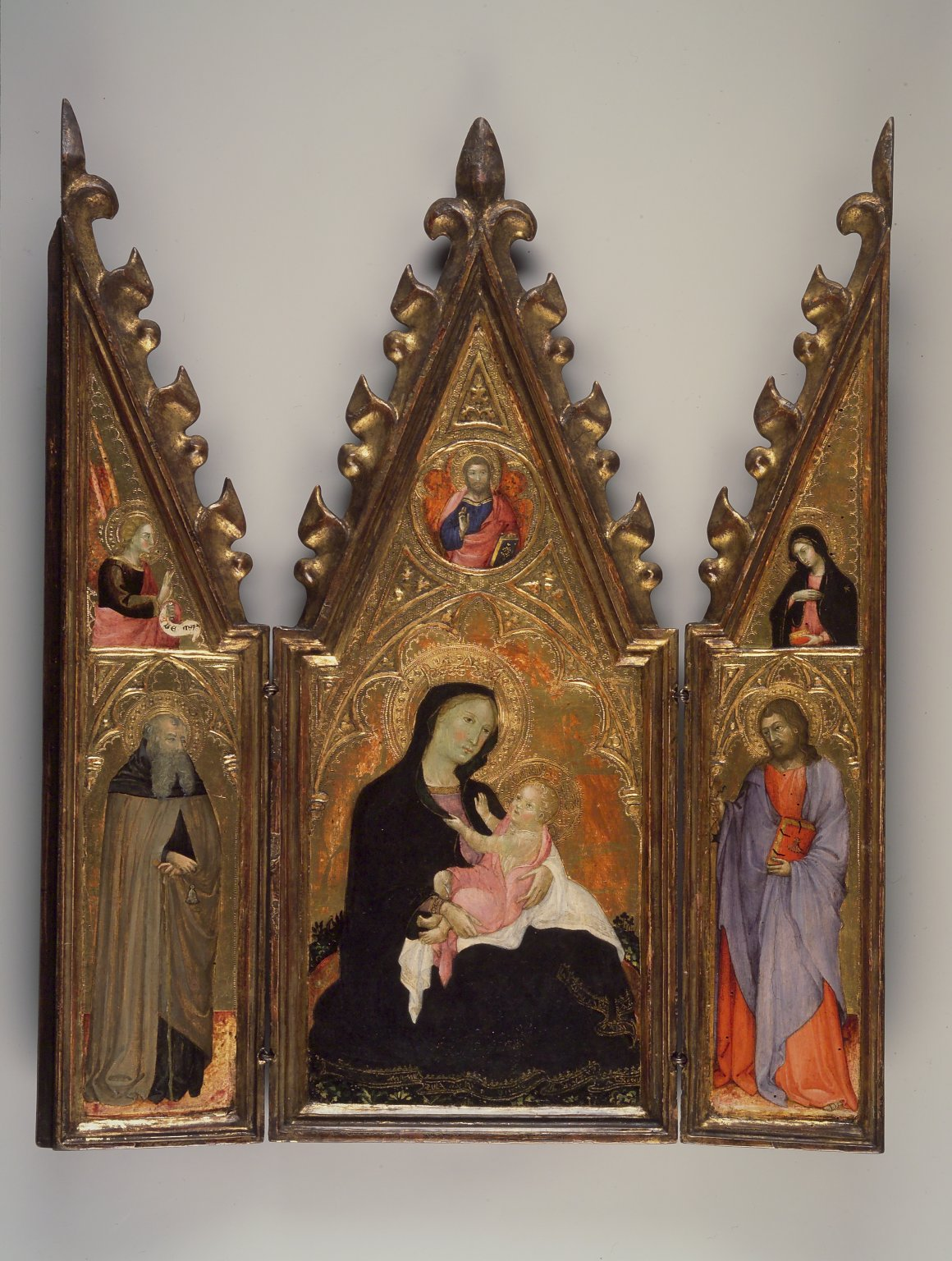
Andrea di Bartolo, c. 1410

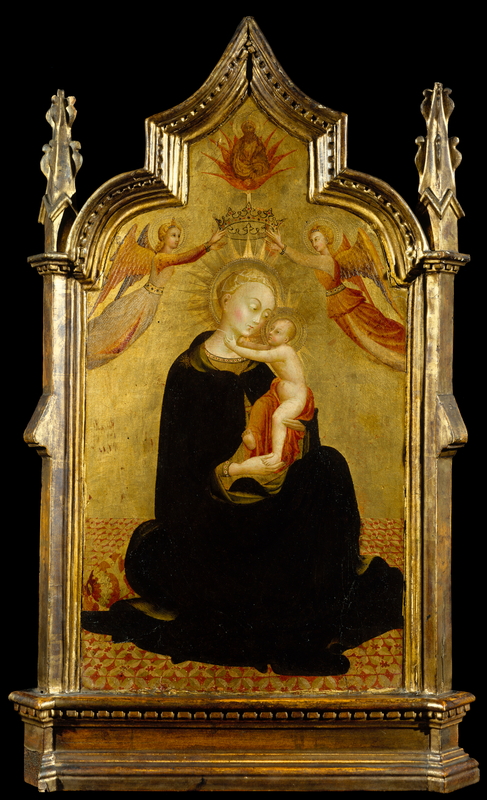
Sassetta, ca. 1445–1450

After Robert Campin, set in a hortus conclusus

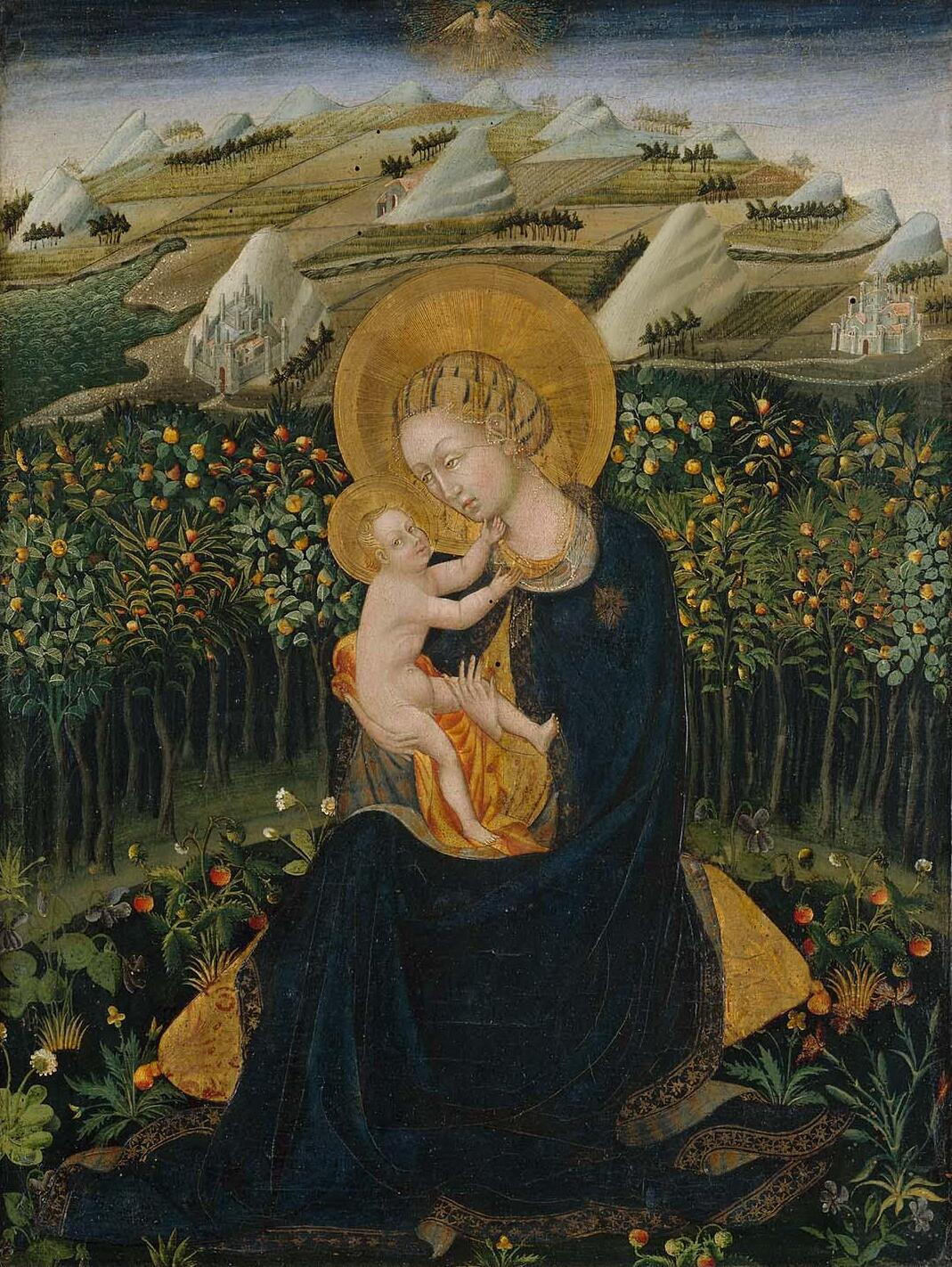
Giovanni di Paolo, c. 1456

== See also ==
- Marian art in the Catholic Church
