= What Did You Do for Summer Break =

EP by American songwriter M Ross Perkins

What Did You Do For Summer Break

EP by M Ross Perkins
- Released: August 31, 2018
- Recorded: Dayton, Ohio
- Genre: Psychedelic, Psychedelic pop, Soft rock, Blue-eyed soul
- Length: 24:36
- Label: SofaBurn
- Producer: M Ross Perkins

M Ross Perkins chronology
M Ross Perkins (2016)	What Did You Do For Summer Break (2018)	E Pluribus M Ross (2022)

What Did You Do For Summer Break is an EP by American songwriter M Ross Perkins. It was released in digital format on August 31, 2018, on SofaBurn Records.

== Track listing ==
All songs composed and arranged by M Ross Perkins.

1. "Bed Sheet Wing" – 4:20
2. "I'm Going Out to See My Baby" – 3:36
3. "When You're Near Me" – 3:38
4. "Hopscotch for the Animal Parade" – 4:49
5. "Restless Amy" – 3:25
6. "Don't Call Your Ride" – 4:46

== Personnel ==
- M Ross Perkins – all voices, instruments, and production
