= E Pluribus M Ross =

Studio album by M Ross Perkins
- Released: March 18, 2022
- Recorded: Dayton, Ohio
- Genre: Psychedelic pop
- Length: 44:43
- Label: Colemine/Karma Chief
- Producer: M Ross Perkins

M Ross Perkins chronology
What Did You Do For Summer Break (2018)	E Pluribus M Ross (2022)	What's the Matter, M Ross? (2025)

Professional ratings
Review scores
Source	Rating
American Songwriter	4.5/5 stars
Shindig!	5/5 stars
Uncut	7/10
Hi-Fi Choice	4/5 stars

E Pluribus M Ross is the second full-length studio album by American songwriter M Ross Perkins. It was released on March 18, 2022, on Colemine/Karma Chief Records.

== Track listing ==
1. "Industrial Good Day Mantra" – 4:16
2. "Wrong Wrong Wrong" – 2:56
3. "The New American Laureate" – 3:35
4. "This One" – 4:15
5. "Tired of Me" – 4:20
6. "It's Your Boy" – 3:56
7. "The Clock Reads 60 Seconds from Now" – 1:00
8. "Venti Gasp Inhale" – 3:50
9. "Mr. Marble Eyes (Marbles for His Eyes)" – 3:39
10. "Butterscotch Revue" – 4:10
11. "Pinball Blonde" – 3:33
12. "Funeral for a Satellite" – 5:13

== Personnel ==
Performance

- M Ross Perkins – all voices and instruments

Production

- M Ross Perkins - producer
- JJ Golden – mastering engineer
- Autumn Barney - cover design
- Leroi Conroy - cover design
- Whitney Pelfrey - photography
