= M Ross Perkins (album) =

Studio album by M Ross Perkins
- Released: October 14, 2016
- Recorded: Dayton, Ohio
- Genre: Psychedelic
- Length: 35:57
- Label: SofaBurn
- Producer: M Ross Perkins

M Ross Perkins chronology
M Ross Perkins (2016)	What Did You Do For Summer Break (2018)

Professional ratings
Review scores
Source	Rating
Record Collector	4/5 stars
Shindig!	4/5 stars

M Ross Perkins is the debut studio album by American songwriter M Ross Perkins. It was released on October 14, 2016 on SofaBurn Records on compact disc and on limited edition gold vinyl.

== Track listing ==
All songs composed and arranged by M Ross Perkins.

1. "Humboldt County Green" – 3:05
2. "Project 63 Online" – 3:41
3. "My Poor Daughter" – 2:07
4. "Someone Else" – 3:39
5. "Ever Ever Ever" – 2:56
6. "Let A Little Lazy" – 2:35
7. "Amazing Grace (Grandma's Dead)" – 2:17
8. "Habit-Formin' Drugs" – 3:33
9. "Local Showcase" – 2:55
10. "No Good Sons of Galveston" – 4:00
11. "Annie Waits in a Dream" – 1:13
12. "Of the Gun" – 3:56

== Personnel ==
Performance

- M Ross Perkins – all voices and instruments

Production

- Mike Montgomery – mastering engineer
- Zach Gabbard – studio assistant
- Joseph Sebaali – drum technician
