= Optical Engineering (journal) =

- Discipline: Optical science and engineering
- Language: English
- Edited by: Adam Wax

Publication details
- Former name: Journal of the Society of Photo-Optical Instrumentation Engineers
- History: 1962—present
- Publisher: SPIE
- Frequency: Monthly
- Impact factor: 1.2 (2025)

Standard abbreviations
- ISO 4: Opt. Eng.

Indexing
- CODEN: OPEGAR
- ISSN: 0091-3286 (print); 1560-2303 (web)
- LCCN: 73642058
- OCLC no.: 231848631

Links
- Journal homepage; Online access; Online archive

Optical Engineering is a monthly peer-reviewed scientific journal covering research, development, and uses of optical science and optical engineering, published by SPIE. The editor-in-chief is Adam Wax (Duke University). Past editors include Michael Eismann.

The journal was established under the name Journal of the Society of Photo-Optical Instrumentation Engineers in 1962, succeeding the SPIE Newsletter. It was subsequently retitled to its current name in 1972.

== Abstracting and indexing ==
The journal is abstracted and indexed in:

- Current Contents/Electronics & Telecommunications Collection
- Current Contents/Engineering, Computing & Technology
- Current Contents/Physical, Chemical & Earth Sciences
- EBSCO databases
- Ei Compendex
- Inspec
- Science Citation Index
- Scopus

According to the Journal Citation Reports, the journal has a 2025 impact factor of 1.2.
