= Marian Kazimierczuk =

Scientist and professor

Professor Marian K. Kazimierczuk
- Born: March 3, 1948 (age 78); Smolugi, Poland
- Citizenship: Poland (1948–Present); United States (1994–Present)
- Education: Electronics
- Alma mater: Warsaw University of Technology (1966-1984)
- Scientific career
- Fields: Electronics
- Workplaces: Warsaw University of Technology (1972–1984); Design Automation, Inc. (1984); Virginia Polytechnic Institute and State University (1984–1985); Wright State University (1985-Present)

Marian Kazimierz Kazimierczuk (born 3 March 1948 in Smolugi, Poland) is a Polish and American engineer and scientist specializing in power electronics, high-impact researcher, writer, and professor of technical sciences at Wright State University, Dayton, Ohio, US.

== Early life ==
He received MS, PhD, and D.Sc. (habilitation) degrees from the Department of Electronics, Warsaw University of Technology, Warsaw, Poland, in 1971, 1978, and 1984, respectively. From 1972 to 1984, he was with the Institute of Radio Electronics, Department of Electronics, Warsaw University of Technology, Warsaw, Poland, where he was involved in academic teaching and scientific research.

In 1984, he was a design electrical engineer at Design Automation, Inc., Lexington, MA, US.

From 1984 to 1985, he was a visiting professor at the Department of Electrical and Computer Engineering, Virginia Polytechnic Institute and State University, Blacksburg, VA, US.

Since 1985, he has been with the Department of Electrical Engineering, Wright State University, Dayton, OH, US, where he is currently a Distinguished Professor.

== Research ==
His research interests are in the field of power electronics, in particular dc-dc power resonant and pulse-width modulated (PWM) converters, high-efficiency RF power amplifiers and oscillators, wide-band gap power SiC and GaN power semiconductor devices, modeling and control of power converters, linearization of nonlinear circuits, high-frequency magnetic components, electronic ballasts for fluorescent lamps, power quality, electromagnetic compatibility, probabilistic circuit design, wireless power transfer, renewable energy sources, and engineering education.

He is the author or co-author 8 academic and engineering books published by John Wiley & Sons and Pearson (formerly, Prentice-Hall). Two of his books have been translated into Chinese. Web of Science shows about 9,500 citations with h-index = 52 and average citation per paper = 36. Google Scholar shows about 24,000 citations with h-index = 72 and i10-index = 326. Scopus Preview shows about 11,125 citations with h-index = 55. He also holds 8 patents.

== Distinctions ==
In 2009, his Title of Professor of Technical Sciences was conferred by the President of the Republic of Poland.

He is a Life Fellow of the IEEE.

He is a Distinguished Fellow of the Collegium of Eminent Scientists of Polish Origin and Ancestry, The Kosciuszko Foundation, US.

He is a member the American Society for Engineering Education.

He holds a position in the ranking "Top Scientists - Electronics and Electrical Engineering".

== Selected bibliography ==
- Resonant Power Converters, IEEE Press/John Wiley & Sons, New York, NY, 1-st Ed., 1994, 2-nd Ed., 2011, (co-author D. Czarkowski)
- Electronic Devices, A Design Approach, Prentice Hall, Upper Saddle River, NJ, 2004 (co-author A. Aminian)
- Lab Manual to accompany: Electronic Devices, A Design Approach, Prentice Hall, Upper Saddle River, NJ, 2004 (co-author A. Aminian)
- Pulse-Width Modulated DC-DC Power Converters, John Wiley & Sons, New York, NY, 1-ed Ed., 2008, 2-nd Ed., 2016
- RF Power Amplifiers, John Wiley & Sons, Chichester, UK, 1-st Ed., 2008, 2-nd Ed., 2015 (translated into Chinese)
- High-Frequency Magnetic Components, John Wiley & Sons, Chichester, UK, 1-st Ed., 2009, 2-nd Ed., 2014 (translated into Chinese)
- Laboratory Manual for Pulse-Width Modulated DC-DC Power Converters, John Wiley & Sons, Chichester, UK, 2016 (co-author A. Ayachit)
- Average Current-Mode Control of DC-DC Power Converters, John Wiley & Sons, Chichester, UK, 2022 (co-authors D. K. Saini, A. Ayachit)
