= Titanoboa: Monster Snake =

2012 documentary film

- Original title: Titanoboa: Monster Snake
- Based on: Titanoboa
- Directed by: Martin Kemp
- Country of origin: United States
- Original language: English

Production
- Producer: Wide-Eyed Entertainment
- Running time: 93 minutes

Original release
- Network: Smithsonian Channel
- Release: April 1, 2012

Titanoboa: Monster Snake is a 2012 documentary film produced by the Smithsonian Institution. The documentary treats Titanoboa, the largest snake ever found. Fossils of the snake were uncovered from the Cerrejón Formation at Cerrejón, the 10th-largest coal mine in the world in the Cesar-Ranchería Basin of La Guajira, northern Colombia, covering an area larger than Washington, DC.

The documentary premiered at the Smithsonian Channel on April 1, 2012, followed by a panel discussion from the scientists who spearheaded the research: Carlos Jaramillo from the Smithsonian Tropical Research Institute, Jonathan Bloch from the Florida Museum of Natural History, and Jason Head from the University of Nebraska at Lincoln. The documentary was released on March 28, 2012, at the Baird Auditorium of the Smithsonian National Museum of Natural History.

== Cast ==
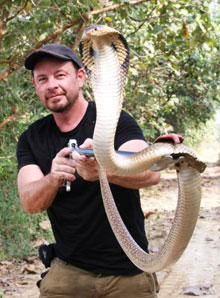
Shawn Heflick, who featured in Titanoboa: Monster Snake

- Jim Conrad (Narrator)
- Dr. Jonathan Bloch (himself)
- Edwin Cadena (himself)
- Percy Fawcett (archive photo)
- Alex Hastings (himself)
- Dr. Jason Head (himself)
- Shawn Heflick (himself)
- Fabiany Herrera (himself)
- Kevin Hockley (himself)
- Carlos Jaramillo (himself)
- P. David Polly (himself)
- Jesús Rivas (himself)
