= Donna Schlagheck =

American political scientist

Donna M. Schlagheck is the chair of the Political Science department at Wright State University in Dayton, Ohio. She is Vice President of the National College Conference Association.

Schlagheck's expertise is in international terrorism, the United Nations, and American foreign policy. She is author of International Terrorism: An Introduction to Concepts and Actors and co-author of the textbook Issues in American Political Life: Money, Violence, and Biology. She is nearby Wright Patterson Air Force Base's Defense Institute of Security Assistance Management international affairs expert. Schlagheck is a board member and past President of the Dayton Council on World Affairs (DCOWA), and awarded the first Dayton peace prize to Archbishop Desmond Tutu.

Schlagheck has led the Wright Model UN team to awards for thirty consecutive years and was named one of Greene County's "Greene County Achievers". She also was recognized in Ohio Magazine's Excellence in Education Recognition Program.
