= Mike Tracy =

American college soccer player and coach

Personal information
- Place of birth: Fenton, Missouri
- Position: Midfielder

Youth career
- Years: Team
- 1989–1992: Wright State Raiders

Managerial career
- 1997–2000: Wright State Raiders (assistant)
- 2001–2008: Wright State Raiders

Mike Tracy is an American collegiate soccer coach.

== Playing career ==
He attended Wright State University where he played college soccer. From 1989 to 1992, he started in 62 games scoring 4 goals and 13 assists.He was named Team Rookie of the Year in 1989, and a second team all Big Soccer Conference Selection in 1990.

== Coaching career ==
From 2001 to 2008, he served as the head men's soccer coach at Wright State University, where he has won 63 games, and posted three ten win seasons. He was selected as Ohio Division 1 coach of the year winner in 2001, leading the Raiders to a 12–7–1 record. He previously served as an assistant coach with the Raiders.
