= Michael Eismann =

American scientist and IEEE fellow

Michael Theodore Eismann
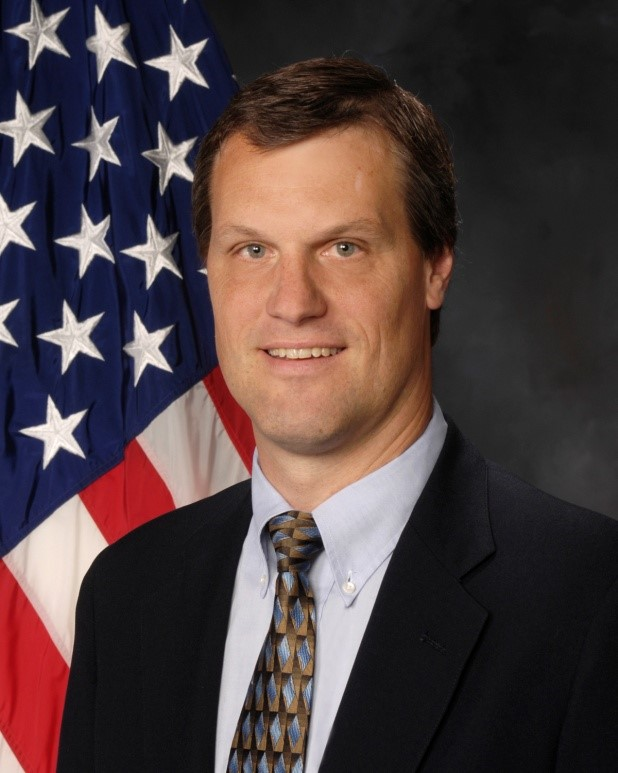
- Born: 1964 (age 61–62); Covington, Kentucky
- Education: University of Dayton, Ohio
- Scientific career
- Fields: Passive infrared imaging Hyperspectral remote sensing
- Workplaces: Air Force Research Laboratory
- Thesis: Resolution enhancement of hyperspectral imagery using maximum a posteriori estimation with a stochastic mixing model (2004)

Michael Theodore Eismann (born 1964) is an American scientist and researcher working at the Air Force Research Laboratory. He is a former editor of Optical Engineering and a member of the NATO Sensors and Electronics Technology panel. In 2023, Eismann was elevated to fellow membership of the IEEE.

== Education and early life ==
Eismann was born in 1964 in Covington, Kentucky. In 1985, he received a Bachelor's degree in Physics from Thomas More College, Kentucky. In 1987, he gained a Master's degree in Electrical Engineering from the Georgia Institute of Technology. Eismann received a PhD in Electro-Optics from the University of Dayton, Ohio, in 2004, overseen by Russell Craig Hardie. His dissertation was Resolution enhancement of hyperspectral imagery using maximum a posteriori estimation with a stochastic mixing model.

== Career ==
Eismann is Chief Scientist at the Sensors Directorate of the Air Force Research Laboratory (AFRL), being promoted in December 2014. He had joined AFRL in 1996 and previously served as the Air Force Senior Scientist for Electro-Optical and Infrared Sensors. His main areas of research are passive infrared imaging and hyperspectral remote sensing, areas which he is considered an authority on in the scientific community. Eismann has authored multiple journal articles and book chapters on these areas. Eismann is also an adjunct professor at the Air Force Institute of Technology.

Eismann's previous work includes time at the Environmental Research Institute of Michigan (1987-1996), serving as the U.S. National Representative on the NATO Sensors and Electronics Technology panel and serving on the Society of Photo-Optical Instrumentation Engineers (SPIE) Board of Directors. He served some time as Editor-in-Chief of the journal Optical Engineering, succeeding Ronald Driggers. He was in the position from 2014-2020.

== Awards and honours ==
- Made a fellow of the Air Force Research Laboratory in 2008
- Made an SPIE fellow in 2010
- Made a fellow of the Military Sensing Symposia in 2010
- 2012 SPIE President's Award
- 2018 Meritorious Senior Professional Presidential Rank Award
- 2018 Optica/SPIE Joseph W. Goodman Book Writing Award for Hyperspectral remote sensing
- 2020 NATO Science and Technology Achievement Award
- Elevated to fellow member of the IEEE in 2023 "for extraordinary technical leadership of hyperspectral remote sensing and infrared technology research for defense applications"

== Publications ==
- Eismann, Michael Theodore: Resolution enhancement of hyperspectral imagery using maximum a posteriori estimation with a stochastic mixing model. Doctoral thesis, University of Dayton, 2004.
- Eismann, Michael Theodore and Stein, David: Stochastic Mixture Modeling. Book chapter in Hyperspectral Data Exploitation: Theory and Applications. Wiley, 2007. ISBN 9780470124611
- Eismann, Michael Theodore: Hyperspectral remote sensing. SPIE, 2012. ISBN 9780819487889
- LaMaster, Daniel and Eismann, Michael Theodore: Passive Polarimetric Imaging. Book chapter in Multi-Dimensional Imaging. Wiley, 2014. ISBN 9781118705742
