= M Ross Perkins =

American singer-songwriter

- Born: Michael Ross Perkins; Dayton, Ohio, United States
- Genres: Neo-psychedelic; psychedelic pop
- Occupation: Musician
- Labels: Colemine; Karma Chief; Sofaburn
- Website: mrossperkins.com

Michael Ross Perkins is a songwriter and recording artist from Dayton, Ohio.

== History ==
=== Early years ===
Perkins grew up in Fairborn, Ohio, a suburb of Dayton. During his earliest years, his family lived on Titus Avenue in Dayton's Northridge neighborhood, a few houses away from Guided By Voices frontman Robert Pollard. Perkins has stated that his proximity and early exposure to Guided By Voices was influential, noting that Pollard's lo-fi production techniques and uninhibited vocal approach gave him the confidence to "make weird sounds" with his voice. In 2002, Perkins began experimenting with a Tascam Portastudio 4-track cassette recorder and amassed a catalog of original songs.

In 2007, Perkins' early psychedelic material was discovered by MGMT, who offered him a touring support slot at the time of their debut release, Oracular Spectacular, on Columbia Records. However, Perkins declined due to anxiety. During this time, Perkins worked as a roadie for Buffalo Killers on multiple tours in support of The Black Crowes. Perkins later referred to this experience as his "formal introduction to the music industry," and in 2011, all three members of Buffalo Killers acted as his live backing band for a brief period.

=== 2014–2018 ===
Sofaburn Records approached Perkins with a recording contract in 2015, after Zachary Gabbard of Buffalo Killers presented the company with a collection of Perkins' home recordings. In January 2016, Perkins recorded the drum tracks for his debut release at Gabbard's analog studio, Howler Hills Farm, before completing the remainder of the album's instrumentation alone at his own home studio. The album, called M Ross Perkins, was announced after the song "Humboldt County Green" premiered in High Times in July 2016. The album was released by Sofaburn on October 14, 2016. Critical reception of the record was enthusiastic, with Record Collector calling it "a truly great album" and others drawing notable stylistic comparisons to solo artists such as Harry Nilsson and Emitt Rhodes.

After touring in support of the debut, Perkins produced a follow-up EP entitled What Did You Do For Summer Break, which Sofaburn released in streaming format in August 2018. Critics noted a shift to "a more sophisticated and precise," pop-oriented writing style throughout the EP. Brooklyn music critic Jack Rabid, publisher of The Big Takeover, described it as "dreamy" and called Perkins the "Brian Wilson to Pollard's Pete Townshend." While promoting the EP, Perkins performed the song "Amazing Grace (Grandma's Dead)" on the Jerry Springer Podcast, with Springer and producer Jene Galvin calling it the best song ever performed on the show.

=== Present ===
In 2020, Ohio-based soul label Colemine Records signed Perkins to their Karma Chief imprint and released the song "Wrong Wrong Wrong," both as a 7" single and on their 2021 Brighter Days Ahead compilation. Colemine/Karma Chief went on to release Perkins' second full-length album, E Pluribus M Ross, in March 2022. The album had been recorded during the COVID-19 pandemic of 2020, with Perkins again performing all of the instrumentation himself in his home studio. E Pluribus M Ross received critical acclaim, with Shindig! giving it 5 out of 5 stars and Uncut calling it "a record full of harmonic joy." American Songwriter called the album "an impressive and often extraordinary work," remarking that "[Perkins] acquits himself as well as, and arguably better than, [Paul] McCartney did on 2020’s also entirely solo McCartney III."

After the release of E Pluribus M Ross, Perkins made guest appearances on a number of Colemine/Karma Chief releases by Andrew Gabbard, playing bass alongside Karma Chief labelmate Neal Francis on 2022's Live in Loveland and performing keyboard on 2023's Cedar City Sweetheart.

In May 2025, Perkins released his third full-length album, What's the Matter, M Ross?

== Discography ==
- M Ross Perkins (2016)
- What Did You Do for Summer Break (2018)
- E Pluribus M Ross (2022)
- What's the Matter, M Ross? (2025)
