= Shawn Heflick =

American biologist

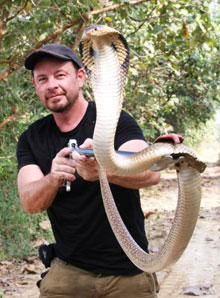
Heflick holding a large Indian cobra

Shawn Heflick (born June 17, 1969) is an American explorer, herpetologist, and television host.

== Biography ==
Shawn Heflick grew up on his family farm near Marion, Ohio. He became fascinated with reptiles after exploring in the woods and encountering a mating ball of garter snakes. He graduated from Wright State University in 1993. He is the president of the Central Florida Herpetological Society.

While working with the Florida Wildlife and Conservation Commission, Heflick began appearing on the show Python Hunters on Nat Geo Wild. In the show, Heflick and his crew travel into the Everglades to hand-capture Burmese pythons for study. He also features in an episode of Nature titled "Invasion of the Giant Pythons", as well as the documentary film Titanoboa: Monster Snake.
