= W. S. McIntosh =

William Sumpter McIntosh
- Born: February 2, 1921
- Died: March 4, 1974 (aged 53); Dayton, Ohio, US
- Other names: W. S. McIntosh; Sumpter McIntosh
- Organization: Congress of Racial Equality
- Movement: Civil Rights Movement

William Sumpter McIntosh (February 2, 1921 – March 4, 1974) was a civil rights leader from Dayton, Ohio. In 1960, McIntosh went to Atlanta, Georgia to observe the Rev. Dr. Martin Luther King Jr. and on February 26, 1961, he led one of the first major civil rights protests in the Dayton, Ohio community. He challenged segregation in Dayton before the Civil Rights Movement gained attention nationally. McIntosh tried negotiation first. If that didn't work, he roused blacks to push for their rights by picketing, sit-ins and boycotts. He utilized nonviolent methods to fight for the rights of minorities to work at Rike's department store, Liberal supermarket, and other establishments in the Dayton area.

McIntosh organized community groups and was the executive director of the Dayton chapter of the Congress of Racial Equality (CORE).

On March 4, 1974, McIntosh was shot in the heart and killed by Calvin Farmer outside his family-owned store while trying to prevent a robbery at a jewelry store in downtown Dayton.

== Recognition ==
In recognition of W. S. McIntosh's heroic efforts and civic responsibility, the City of Dayton has named a park in his honor - W. S. McIntosh Park. Dayton community and University of Dayton leaders offered a public salute to W. S. McIntosh in June 2007 at the Dayton Cultural and RTA Center. In conjunction with the University of Dayton, they sponsor a scholarship for minority students who reside in the city of Dayton. This scholarship, the W. S. McIntosh Memorial Leadership Award, covers tuition, fees, and room and board while the student is attending the University of Dayton for eight semesters and is awarded to one student each year.
