= Kiril Merdzhanski =

Kiril Merdzhanski (also transliterated Merjanski) (Bulgarian: Кирил Мерджански) (born 30 July 1955 in Sofia) is a Bulgarian poet, playwright and translator from English. He graduated in History from Saint Kliment Ohridski University of Sofia. He lives in the United States where he graduated with Master's in History (2007) from Wright State University. He is considered to be one of the most influential postmodern Bulgarian poets. His works have been translated into English, French, Bosnian, Croatian, German, Czech and Swedish.

Merdzhanski is married to the Bulgarian critic Irene Ivantcheva, or Irene Ivantcheva-Merjanska.

== Works ==
- Koi ubi Pitagor [Кой уби Питагор?, Who Killed Pythagoras?, a play], Sofia, 1988
- Noshchen priliv [Нощен прилив, Night Tide, poems], Sofia, 1990
- Izbrani epitafii ot zaleza na rimskata imperiia [Избрани епитафии от залеза на Римската империя, Selected Epitaphs from the Decline of the Roman Empire, poetry], Sofia, Tipografika, 1992, ISBN 954-8288-01-X
- Oblachna zemia [Облачна земя, A Cloudy Earth, poems], Sofia, Svobodno poetichesko obshtestvo, 1995
- Mitut za Odisei v novata bukolicheska poeziia [Митът за Одисей в новата буколическа поезия, The Myth of Ulysses in the New Bucolic Poetry], Sofia, Agentsiia Ima, 1997, ISBN 954-9670-01-5. Excerpts from this book were used in The Atoll which won the Grand Prix Europe Award for the Best European Radio Drama in 1999.
- Tirezij slepiiat [Терезий слепият, Tiresias the Blind, a play], was staged in 1998-1999, at the Sfumato Theater in Sofia.
- Ptitsi, pogledi, pustini [Птици, погледи, пустини, Birds, Visions, Deserts, poems], Sofia, 2002
- Antichnost sled antichnostta [Античност след античността, Antiquity after the Antiquity], Sofia, 2004
- The Serbian-Bulgarian Treaties of 1904 and the Balkan Policy of Russia: Toward the Breakdown of Equilibrium in Eastern Europe Before the Bosnian Crisis. Publisher: VDM Verlag Dr. Müller, 2008.
- "Antigone" By Sophocles. Poetical translation into Bulgarian by Kiril Merjanski. Sofia, Publisher: Prosveta, 2015. ISBN 978-954-01-3135-1
