= W. A. Halteman =

American politician in the state of Washington

Member of the Washington House of Representatives for the 31st district
- In office 1895–1897

Member of the Washington House of Representatives for the 55th district
- In office 1907–1909

Personal details
- Born: June 27, 1860 Dayton, Ohio, United States
- Died: October 20, 1945 (aged 85) Spokane, Washington, United States
- Party: Republican

William A. Halteman (June 27, 1860 – October 20, 1945) was an American Republican politician in the state of Washington. He served in the Washington House of Representatives.
