= Smolugi =

- Village
- Location within Poland
- Coordinates: 52°37′N 22°55′E
- Country: Poland
- Voivodeship: Podlaskie
- County: Siemiatycze
- Gmina: Dziadkowice
- Population: 124

Smolugi [smɔˈluɡi] is a village in the administrative district of Gmina Dziadkowice, within Siemiatycze County, Podlaskie Voivodeship, in north-eastern Poland.

According to the 1921 census, the village was inhabited by 113 people, among whom 101 were Roman Catholic, 7 Orthodox, and 5 Mosaic. At the same time, 106 inhabitants declared Polish nationality, 7 Belarusian. There were 18 residential buildings in the village.
