= Bill Klesse =

American business executive (born 1947)

Bill Klesse is the former chairman and CEO of Valero Energy Corporation. Mr. Klesse received a bachelor's degree in chemical engineering from the University of Dayton and earned an MBA in finance from West Texas A&M University.
