= Perry Yaney =

American physicist (1931–2025)

- Born: Pericles Constantine Pappas; July 28, 1931; Cincinnati, Ohio, U.S.
- Died: August 5, 2025 (aged 94); Dayton, Ohio, U.S.
- Education: University of Cincinnati
- Occupation: Physicist
- Spouse: Mary Wulfeck

Pericles Constantine Pappas (July 28, 1931 – August 5, 2025) was an American physicist.

== Early life and career ==
Yaney was born in Cincinnati, Ohio, on July 28, 1931. He attended the University of Cincinnati, earning his BS degree in electrical engineering in 1954 and his PhD degree in physics in 1963.

Yaney served as a professor in the department of physics at the University of Dayton from 1975 until his retirement in June 2004. After retiring as a professor, in the same year, he was named a fellow of the American Physical Society, "for outstanding contributions to the development of physicists through teaching, research and service; performing significant and long-standing activities in the service of the physics community and mentoring a generation of electro-optics students".

== Personal life and death ==
Yaney was married to Mary Wulfeck. Their marriage lasted until Yaney's death in 2025.

Yaney died in Dayton, Ohio on August 5, 2025, at the age of 94.
