= Andrew Ladis =

American art historian (1949–2007)

- Born: January 30, 1949; Athens, Greece
- Died: December 2, 2007 (aged 58); Athens, Georgia, U.S.
- Education: University of Virginia (BA, MA, PhD)
- Occupations: Art historian and professor
- Known for: Research studies on early Italian Renaissance painting

Andrew Thomas Ladis (January 30, 1949 – December 2, 2007) was a Greek-born American art historian particularly known for his studies on early Italian Renaissance painting. His 1983 book, Taddeo Gaddi: A Critical Review and Catalogue Raisonné, was the first detailed study of Taddeo Gaddi in the English language. At time of his death he was the Franklin Professor of Art History at the University of Georgia's Lamar Dodd School of Art.

== Biography ==
Andrew Ladis was born in Athens, Greece. His parents, Thomas and Marina Ladis, emigrated to the United States when Ladis was a small boy and settled in Richmond, Virginia, where he graduated from Thomas Jefferson High School. He received his BA in history (with Distinction) from the University of Virginia in 1970. After graduating, he briefly attended the University of Virginia Law School, but then transferred to the Graduate School of Arts and Sciences to study art history. He earned his MA in 1974 and PhD in 1978. His doctoral thesis was on the 14th century Italian painter Taddeo Gaddi. Ladis would later expand this dissertation into his first book, Taddeo Gaddi: A Critical Review and Catalogue Raisonné, the first detailed study of Gaddi in the English language. After teaching at Austin Peay State University in Tennessee, the State University of New York at Potsdam, Vanderbilt University, and Wright State University in Ohio, he joined the faculty of the University of Georgia in 1987 and remained there for the rest of his career, becoming the Franklin Professor of Art History at the university's Lamar Dodd School of Art.

While at the University of Georgia he took time off to spend a year at the University of Memphis, where he held the Hohenberg Chair of Excellence in Art History, and twice served as a Fellow and Visiting Professor at the Harvard University Center for Italian Renaissance Studies in Florence. Later in life, he also developed an interest in American art and wrote a series of essays on Gerald Brockhurst, Lucy May Stanton, George Biddle, Raphael Soyer, Paul Cadmus, and Andrée Ruellan. Ladis died of cancer in Athens, Georgia, on December 2, 2007, at the age of 58. He was survived by his partner of 37 years, William Underwood Eiland, director of the Georgia Museum of Art.

Papers from Ladis's 2006 Festschrift were published in The Historian's Eye: Essays on Italian Art in Honor of Andrew Ladis (Georgia Museum of Art, 2009).

== Selected bibliography ==
Ladis was the general editor or co-editor of six volumes and series on art history, as well as authoring numerous scholarly articles and monographs and several books, including:

- Taddeo Gaddi: A Critical Review and Catalogue Raisonné (1983)
- The Brancacci Chapel, Florence (1993)
- Studies in Italian Art (2001)
- Victims and Villains in Vasari's Lives (Bettie Allison Rand Lectures in Art History) (2008)
- Giotto's "O": Narrative, Figuration, and Pictorial Ingenuity in the Arena Chapel (2008)

== Sources ==
- Explorations in Renaissance Culture vol. 32, no. 2 (Winter 2006). (This issue, which contains articles by Andrew Ladis, Marina Della Putta Johnston, Karen Goodchild, April Oettinger and Norman Land, is dedicated to Andrew Ladis. A brief memoir concerning Andrew Ladis by Bruce Cole also appears)
- Georgia Museum of Art, Publications: Renaissance and Baroque Art, 2009. Retrieved 2010-09-07.
- University of Georgia, Andrew Ladis. Retrieved 2010-09-07.
- Phillips, Julie, "Art world mourns loss", Athens Banner-Herald, December 4, 2007. Retrieved 2010-09-07.
- Harvard University Center for Italian Renaissance Studies, In Memoriam: Andrew Ladis, 2007, Retrieved 2010-09-07.
