= Terry Oroszi =

American author (born 1966)

- Born: July 18, 1966 (age 60); Muscatine, Iowa, United States
- Education: Wright State University (BS, MS, and Ed.D.)
- Occupation: Author
- Writing career
- Period: April 2008 – present
- Genres: Psychology, Terrorism, Security Studies, FBI
- Website: www.drterryoroszi.com

Terry Oroszi is an American author. She is a Professor and Vice Chair at Wright State University.

== Early life and education ==
Oroszi graduated high school in Muscatine, Iowa and announced to her parents that she was putting college on hold, instead she was joining the Army.

Oroszi attended Wright State University for undergraduate degree in Biological Sciences. She then pursued MS in Biological Sciences from Wright State University. Oroszi earned her doctoral degree in education from Wright State University by completing a study and dissertation on high-stakes decision-making for crisis leadership under the guidance of Jill Lindsey.

== Career ==
=== Academic ===
Oroszi began her career as a Graduate Teaching Assistant at the Department of Biological Sciences in Wright State University between 1998 and 2000. Between 2001 and 2007, Oroszi was employed as a research assistant, initially at the Department of Biological Sciences in Wright State University (2001-2013) and later a staff scientist in the pharmacology and toxicology department, Boonshoft School of Medicine, Wright State University. In 2008, Oroszi was made director of education in the department.

Oroszi has spoken on American terrorism, CBRN, power, and leadership, to fellow academics, members of the military, government, and industry. Notable speaking engagements in 2019 include the National Security Agency, Quantico, and US Congressional Staff in Washington, DC.,

=== Board positions ===
- Oroszi serves on the National InfraGard Members Alliance Board as secretary. Prior to that she was the InfraGard Dayton chapter president (2020)
- Oroszi serves as chairman and cofounder of The Dayton Think Tank. The Dayton Think Tank's focus is on crisis, threat, emergency and disaster management for S.W. Ohio.

== Bibliography ==
=== Books ===
- Terry Oroszi, 2008, Descendants of Johann and Margaretha Rupp and Their Families: 200 Years of Family History, Greylander Press, 978-0-9821683-0-1
- Larry James and Terry Oroszi, 2015, Weapons of Mass Psychological Destruction and the People Who Use Them, ABC-Clio, 978-1-4408-3755-5
- Terry Oroszi, 2019, Operation Deep Dive: A Step Into the Past, Greylander Press, 978-0-9821683-7-0
- Terry Oroszi, 2019, Mr. Smith Goes To North Korea, Greylander Press, 978-0-9821683-5-6
- Terry Oroszi, 2019, Operation Stormfront: From Weatherman to Wall Street, Greylander Press, 978-0-9821683-6-3
- Terry Oroszi and David Ellis, 2019, The American Terrorist: Everything You Need to Know to be a Subject Matter Expert, Greylander Press, 978-0-9821683-3-2
- Terry Oroszi, 2020, Operation Stormfront: From Weatherman to Wall Street THE GRAPHIC NOVEL, Greylander Press, 978-0-9821683-4-9

=== Chapters ===
- Oroszi T.L., Shoenleben J., James L.C., 2018, "Increasing Healthy Exercise in the Primary Care Setting", Behavioral Medicine, and Integrated Care, Duckworth M., O'Donohue W., Springer, Cham, 978-3-319-93003-9
- Terry Oroszi, 2019, "Contextual Factors Influencing CBRN Leadership Decision-Making", Chemical Warfare Agents: Biomedical and Psychological Effects, Medical Countermeasures, and Emergency Response, Lukey, B. J., Romano Jr, J. A., & Salem, H., CRC Press,9781498769211
- Terry Oroszi and David Ellis, 2020, "The Mindset of a Terrorist", Agroterrorism: National Defense Assessment, Strategies, and Capabilities, Norton, R. & Mauroni, A, Maxwell Air Force Base, Alabama, 978-0-9914849-5-9
