= Paul Sorg =

Paul Sorg may refer to:

- Paul J. Sorg (1840–1902), member of the United States House of Representatives from Ohio
- Paul Arthur Sorg (1878–1913), owner and exhibitor of show horses
