= Ohio's 3rd congressional district =

U.S. House district for Ohio

Coordinates: 39°57′58″N 82°56′51″W

- Interactive map of district boundaries since January 3, 2023 (Note: The district includes the same census blocks as drawn for the 2020 redistricting cycle in 2022 and during mid-decade redistricting in 2025. As such, boundaries of the district will not change at the 2026 elections.)
- Representative: Joyce Beatty; D–Columbus
- Distribution: 99.82% urban; 0.18% rural
- Population (2025): 801,901
- Median household income: $74,105
- Ethnicity: 55.1% White; 27.5% Black; 6.3% Hispanic; 5.6% Asian; 4.8% Two or more races; 0.8% other
- Cook PVI: D+21

Ohio's 3rd congressional district is located entirely in Franklin County and includes most of the city of Columbus. The current district lines were drawn in 2022, following the redistricting based on the 2020 census. It is currently represented by Democrat Joyce Beatty.

It was one of several districts challenged in a 2018 lawsuit seeking to overturn Ohio's congressional map due to alleged unconstitutional gerrymandering. According to the lawsuit, the 3rd was "shaped like a snowflake" that was designed to "fracture" Columbus. The plaintiffs focused on the 3rd in part because the 2013-2023 version of the district was barely contiguous. In some portions, it was almost, but not quite, split in two by the neighboring 12th and 15th districts which split the rest of Columbus between them.

The 2013-2023 map drew most of the heavily Democratic portions of Columbus into the 3rd, with much of the rest of Columbus split into the more Republican 12th and 15th districts. An alternative plan was to split Columbus between four districts, creating 13 safe Republican seats. In May 2019, the U.S. District Court in Cincinnati deemed the map unconstitutional, as intentionally drawn to keep Republicans in power and disenfranchise Democratic voters. The U.S. Supreme Court discarded the district court ruling in October 2019.

In 2018, Ohio voters approved a ballot measure known as Issue 1, which grants the minority party oversight on redistricting, requiring 50 percent minority party approval for district maps. The process would only take place after the 2020 census and presidential election.

For most of the time from 1887 to 2003, the 3rd was a Dayton-based district; much of that territory is now the 10th district.

== Composition ==
For the 118th and successive Congresses (based on redistricting following the 2020 census), the district contains all or portions of the following counties, townships, and municipalities:

Franklin County (20)

Bexley, Blendon Township, Columbus (part; also 4th, 12th, and 15th; shared with Delaware and Fairfield counties), Gahanna, Grandview Heights, Jefferson Township, Marble Cliff, Mifflin Township, Minerva Park, New Albany (part; also 12th; shared with Licking County), Perry Township, Plain Township, Riverlea, Reynoldsburg (part; also 12th; shared with Licking County), Sharon Township, Truro Township, Upper Arlington, Westerville (part; also 4th; shared with Delaware County), Whitehall, Worthington

== Recent election results from statewide races ==
Year	Office	Results
2008	President	Obama 65% - 34%
2012	President	Obama 66% - 34%
2016	President	Clinton 67% - 28%
2016	Senate	Strickland 57% - 39%
2018	Senate	Brown 74% - 26%
2018	Governor	Cordray 69% - 29%
2018	Secretary of State	Clyde 68% - 30%
2018	Treasurer	Richardson Jr. 67% - 33%
2018	Auditor	Space 68% - 28%
2018	Attorney General	Dettelbach 67% - 33%
2020	President	Biden 71% - 27%
2022	Senate	Ryan 72% - 28%
2022	Governor	Whaley 63% - 37%
2022	Secretary of State	Clark 64% - 35%
2022	Treasurer	Schertzer 66% - 34%
2022	Auditor	Sappington 66% - 34%
2022	Attorney General	Crossman 65% - 35%
2024	President	Harris 70% - 29%
2024	Senate	Brown 71% - 26%

== List of members representing the district ==
Member	Party	Year(s)	Cong ress	Electoral history	Counties represented
District established March 4, 1813
Duncan McArthur (Chillicothe)	Federalist	March 4, 1813 – April 5, 1813	13th	Elected in 1812. Resigned.	
Vacant		April 5, 1813 – May 4, 1813	13th		
William Creighton Jr. (Chillicothe)	Democratic-Republican	May 4, 1813 – March 3, 1817	13th 14th	Elected May 10, 1813 to finish McArthur's term and seated June 15, 1813. Re-elected in 1814. Retired.	
Levi Barber (Point Harmar)	Democratic-Republican	March 4, 1817 – March 3, 1819	15th	Elected in 1816. Lost re-election.	
Henry Brush (Chillicothe)	Democratic-Republican	March 4, 1819 – March 3, 1821	16th	Elected in 1818. Lost re-election.	
Levi Barber (Point Harmar)	Democratic-Republican	March 4, 1821 – March 3, 1823	17th	Elected in 1820. Redistricted to the 7th district and lost re-election.	
William McLean (Piqua)	Democratic-Republican	March 4, 1823 – March 3, 1825	18th 19th 20th	Elected in 1822. Re-elected in 1824. Re-elected in 1826. Retired.	
William McLean (Piqua)	Anti-Jacksonian	March 4, 1825 – March 3, 1829	18th 19th 20th	Elected in 1822. Re-elected in 1824. Re-elected in 1826. Retired.	
Joseph Halsey Crane (Dayton)	Anti-Jacksonian	March 4, 1829 – March 3, 1837	21st 22nd 23rd 24th	Elected in 1828. Re-elected in 1830. Re-elected in 1832. Re-elected in 1834. [data missing]	
Patrick Gaines Goode (Sidney)	Whig	March 4, 1837 – March 3, 1843	25th 26th 27th	Elected in 1836. Re-elected in 1838. Re-elected in 1840. [data missing]	
Robert C. Schenck (Dayton)	Whig	March 4, 1843 – March 3, 1851	28th 29th 30th 31st	Elected in 1843. Re-elected in 1844. Re-elected in 1846. Re-elected in 1848. [data missing]	
Hiram Bell (Greenville)	Whig	March 4, 1851 – March 3, 1853	32nd	Elected in 1850. [data missing]	
Lewis D. Campbell (Hamilton)	Whig	March 4, 1853 – March 3, 1855	33rd	Redistricted from the 2nd district and re-elected in 1852. Re-elected in 1854. Lost contested election.	
Lewis D. Campbell (Hamilton)	Anti-Nebraska	March 4, 1855 – March 3, 1857	34th	Redistricted from the 2nd district and re-elected in 1852. Re-elected in 1854. Lost contested election.	
Lewis D. Campbell (Hamilton)	Republican	March 4, 1857 – May 25, 1858	35th	Redistricted from the 2nd district and re-elected in 1852. Re-elected in 1854. Lost contested election.	
Clement Vallandigham (Dayton)	Democratic	May 25, 1858 – March 3, 1863	35th 36th 37th	Won contested election. Re-elected in 1858. Re-elected in 1860. [data missing]	
Robert C. Schenck (Dayton)	Republican	March 4, 1863 – January 5, 1871	38th 39th 40th 41st	Elected in 1862. Re-elected in 1864. Re-elected in 1866. Re-elected in 1868. Resigned to become Minister to Great Britain.	
Vacant		January 5, 1871 – March 3, 1871	41st		
Lewis D. Campbell (Hamilton)	Democratic	March 4, 1871 – March 3, 1873	42nd	Elected in 1870. Declined to run for re-election in 1872.	
John Quincy Smith (Oakland)	Republican	March 4, 1873 – March 3, 1875	43rd	Elected in 1872. [data missing]	
John S. Savage (Wilmington)	Democratic	March 4, 1875 – March 3, 1877	44th	Elected in 1874. [data missing]	
Mills Gardner (Washington Court House)	Republican	March 4, 1877 – March 3, 1879	45th	Elected in 1876. [data missing]	
John A. McMahon (Dayton)	Democratic	March 4, 1879 – March 3, 1881	46th	Redistricted from the 4th district and re-elected in 1878. [data missing]	
Henry Lee Morey (Hamilton)	Republican	March 4, 1881 – March 3, 1883	47th	Elected in 1880. [data missing]	
Robert Maynard Murray (Piqua)	Democratic	March 4, 1883 – March 3, 1885	48th	Elected in 1882. [data missing]	
James E. Campbell (Hamilton)	Democratic	March 4, 1885 – March 3, 1887	49th	Redistricted from the 7th district and re-elected in 1884. Redistricted to the 7th district.	
Elihu S. Williams (Troy)	Republican	March 4, 1887 – March 3, 1891	50th 51st	Elected in 1886. Re-elected in 1888. [data missing]	
George W. Houk (Dayton)	Democratic	March 4, 1891 – February 9, 1894	52nd 53rd	Elected in 1890. Re-elected in 1892. Died.	
Vacant		February 9, 1894 – May 21, 1894	53rd		
Paul J. Sorg (Middletown)	Democratic	May 21, 1894 – March 3, 1897	53rd 54th	Elected to finish Houk's term. Re-elected in 1894. [data missing]	
John Lewis Brenner (Dayton)	Democratic	March 4, 1897 – March 3, 1901	55th 56th	Elected in 1896. Re-elected in 1898. [data missing]	
Robert M. Nevin (Dayton)	Republican	March 4, 1901 – March 3, 1907	57th 58th 59th	Elected in 1900. Re-elected in 1902. Re-elected in 1904. [data missing]	
J. Eugene Harding (Excello)	Republican	March 4, 1907 – March 3, 1909	60th	Elected in 1906. [data missing]	
James M. Cox (Dayton)	Democratic	March 4, 1909 – January 12, 1913	61st 62nd	Elected in 1908. Re-elected in 1910. Resigned when elected Governor of Ohio.	
Vacant		January 12, 1913 – March 3, 1913	62nd		
Warren Gard (Hamilton)	Democratic	March 4, 1913 – March 3, 1921	63rd 64th 65th 66th	Elected in 1912. Re-elected in 1914. Re-elected in 1916. Re-elected in 1918. Retired.	
Roy G. Fitzgerald (Dayton)	Republican	March 4, 1921 – March 3, 1931	67th 68th 69th 70th 71st	Elected in 1920. Re-elected in 1922. Re-elected in 1924. Re-elected in 1926. Re-elected in 1928. Lost re-election.	
Byron B. Harlan (Dayton)	Democratic	March 4, 1931 – January 3, 1939	72nd 73rd 74th 75th	Elected in 1930. Re-elected in 1932. Re-elected in 1934. Re-elected in 1936. Lost re-election.	
Harry N. Routzohn (Dayton)	Republican	January 3, 1939 – January 3, 1941	76th	Elected in 1938. Lost re-election.	
Greg J. Holbrock (Hamilton)	Democratic	January 3, 1941 – January 3, 1943	77th	Elected in 1940. Lost re-election.	
Harry P. Jeffrey (Dayton)	Republican	January 3, 1943 – January 3, 1945	78th	Elected in 1942. Lost re-election.	
Edward J. Gardner (Hamilton)	Democratic	January 3, 1945 – January 3, 1947	79th	Elected in 1944. Lost re-election.	
Raymond H. Burke (Hamilton)	Republican	January 3, 1947 – January 3, 1949	80th	Elected in 1946. Lost re-election.	
Edward G. Breen (Dayton)	Democratic	January 3, 1949 – October 1, 1951	81st 82nd	Elected in 1948. Re-elected in 1950. Resigned due to ill health.	
Vacant		October 1, 1951 – November 6, 1951	82nd		
Paul F. Schenck (Dayton)	Republican	November 6, 1951 – January 3, 1965	82nd 83rd 84th 85th 86th 87th 88th	Elected to finish Breen's term. Re-elected in 1952. Re-elected in 1954. Re-elected in 1956. Re-elected in 1958. Re-elected in 1960. Re-elected in 1962. Lost re-election.	
Rodney M. Love (Dayton)	Democratic	January 3, 1965 – January 3, 1967	89th	Elected in 1964. Lost re-election.	
Charles W. Whalen Jr. (Dayton)	Republican	January 3, 1967 – January 3, 1979	90th 91st 92nd 93rd 94th 95th	Elected in 1966. Re-elected in 1968. Re-elected in 1970. Re-elected in 1972. Re-elected in 1974. Re-elected in 1976. Retired.	
Tony P. Hall (Dayton)	Democratic	January 3, 1979 – September 9, 2002	96th 97th 98th 99th 100th 101st 102nd 103rd 104th 105th 106th 107th	Elected in 1978. Re-elected in 1980. Re-elected in 1982. Re-elected in 1984. Re-elected in 1986. Re-elected in 1988. Re-elected in 1990. Re-elected in 1992. Re-elected in 1994. Re-elected in 1996. Re-elected in 1998. Re-elected in 2000. Resigned when appointed Ambassador to Food and Agriculture Organization of the United Nations.	
Vacant		September 9, 2002 – January 3, 2003	107th		
Mike Turner (Centerville)	Republican	January 3, 2003 – January 3, 2013	108th 109th 110th 111th 112th	Elected in 2002. Re-elected in 2004. Re-elected in 2006. Re-elected in 2008. Re-elected in 2010. Redistricted to the 10th district.	2003–2013
Joyce Beatty (Columbus)	Democratic	January 3, 2013 – present	113th 114th 115th 116th 117th 118th 119th	Elected in 2012. Re-elected in 2014. Re-elected in 2016. Re-elected in 2018. Re-elected in 2020. Re-elected in 2022. Re-elected in 2024. Re-elected in 2026.	2013–2023
Joyce Beatty (Columbus)	Democratic	January 3, 2013 – present	113th 114th 115th 116th 117th 118th 119th	Elected in 2012. Re-elected in 2014. Re-elected in 2016. Re-elected in 2018. Re-elected in 2020. Re-elected in 2022. Re-elected in 2024. Re-elected in 2026.	2023–2027

== Recent election results ==
The following chart shows historic election results. Bold type indicates victor. Italic type indicates incumbent.

Year	Democratic	Republican	Other
1920	William G. Pickrel: 59,214	Roy G. Fitzgerald: 59,214	Clarence M. Gauger: 6,441
1922	Warren Gard: 46,127	**Roy G. Fitzgerald**: 52,111	Joseph Woodward (S): 2,280
1924	John P. Rogers: 43,426	**Roy G. Fitzgerald**: 73,513	Joseph Woodward (S): 1,021
1926	T. A. McCann: 33,253	**Roy G. Fitzgerald**	
1928	Frank L. Humphrey: 55,767	**Roy G. Fitzgerald**: 101,050	
1930	Byron B. Harlan: 62,107	Roy G. Fitzgerald: 60,249	
1932	**Byron B. Harlan**: 85,069	Edith McClure Patterson: 66,107	Jere F. Mincher (S): 4,178
1934	**Byron B. Harlan**: 67,695	Howard F. Heald: 56,480	Jere F. Mincher (S): 1,293; Walter Jones (C): 724
1936	**Byron B. Harlan**: 101,115	Robert N. Brumbaugh: 70,023	Leonidas E. Speer: 9,886
1938	Byron B. Harlan: 58,139	Harry N. Routzohn: 73,534	
1940	Greg J. Holbrock: 103,291	Harry N. Routzohn: 93,002	
1942	Greg J. Holbrock: 48,338	Harry P. Jeffrey: 51,477	
1944	Edward J. Gardner: 104,247	Harry P. Jeffrey: 94,064	
1946	Edward J. Gardner: 65,749	Raymond H. Burke: 71,171	
1948	Edward G. Breen: 110,204	Raymond H. Burke: 79,162	
1950	**Edward G. Breen**: 92,840	Paul F. Schenck: 77,634	
1951*		**Paul F. Schenck**	
1952	Thomas B. Talbot: 107,551	**Paul F. Schenck***: 112,325	
1954	Thomas B. Talbot: 74,585	**Paul F. Schenck**: 82,701	
1956	R. William Patterson: 93,782	**Paul F. Schenck**: 135,152	
1958	Thomas B. Talbot: 93,401	**Paul F. Schenck**: 102,806	
1960	R. William Patterson: 102,237	**Paul F. Schenck**: 167,117	
1962	Martin A. Evers: 85,573	**Paul F. Schenck**: 113,584	
1964	Rodney M. Love: 129,469	Paul F. Schenck: 119,400	
1966	Rodney M. Love: 53,658	Charles W. Whalen, Jr.: 62,471	
1968	Paul Tipps: 32,012	**Charles W. Whalen, Jr.**: 114,549	
1970	Dempsey A. Kerr: 26,735	**Charles W. Whalen, Jr.**: 86,973	Russell G. Butcke (AI): 3,545
1972	John W. Lelak Jr.: 34,819	**Charles W. Whalen, Jr.**: 111,253	
1974		**Charles W. Whalen, Jr.**: 82,159	
1976	Leonard E. Stubbs Jr.: 33,873	**Charles W. Whalen, Jr.**: 100,871	Wilmer M. Hurst: 5,758; John R. Austin: 4,872
1978	Tony P. Hall: 62,849	Dudley P. Kircher: 51,833	Alfred R. Deptula: 2,122
1980	**Tony P. Hall**: 95,558	Albert H. Sealy: 66,698	Richard L. Righter: 2,903; Robert E. Tharpe: 1,710
1982	**Tony P. Hall**: 119,926		Kathryn E. Brown (L): 16,828
1984	**Tony P. Hall**: 151,398		
1986	**Tony P. Hall**: 98,311	Ron Crutcher: 35,167	
1988	**Tony P. Hall**: 141,953	Ron Crutcher: 42,664	
1990	**Tony P. Hall**: 116,797		
1992	**Tony P. Hall**: 146,072	Peter W. Davis: 98,733	
1994	**Tony P. Hall**: 105,342	David A. Westbrock: 72,314	
1996	**Tony P. Hall**: 144,583	David A. Westbrock: 75,732	Dorothy H. Mackey (N): 13,905
1998	**Tony P. Hall**: 114,198	John S. Shondel: 50,544	
2000	**Tony P. Hall**: 177,731		Regina Burch (N): 36,516
2002	Rick Carne: 78,307	Mike Turner: 111,630	Ronald Williamitis: 14
2004	Jane Mitakides: 116,082	**Mike Turner**: 192,150	
2006	Rick Chema: 86,389	**Mike Turner**: 121,885	
2008	Jane Mitakides: 115,976	**Mike Turner**: 200,204	
2010	Joe Roberts : 71,455	**Mike Turner**: 152,629	
2012	**Joyce Beatty** : 201,921	Chris Long : 77,903	Richard Ehrbar III (L) : 9,462; Jeff Brown (WI) : 264; Bob Fitrakis (G) : 6,388
2014	**Joyce Beatty** : 91,769	John Adams: 51,475	Ralph A. Applegate: 17
2016	**Joyce Beatty** : 199,791	John Adams: 91,560	
2018	**Joyce Beatty** : 181,575	Kim Burgess: 65,040	Millie Millam: 62
2020	**Joyce Beatty** : 227,420	Mark Richardson: 93,569	Nicholas Moss (I) (WI): 92 Angela Davis (I) (WI): 11
2022	Joyce Beatty: 182,324	Lee Stahley: 76,455	Alexander Amicucci (I) (WI): 18
2024	Joyce Beatty: 243,991	Michael Young: 97,389	
2026	Joyce Beatty: 231,925	Cleophus Dulaney: 68,407	

=== 1951 special election ===
*In 1951, after Breen's resignation for ill health, Schenck was elected in a special election to complete Breen's term.

=== 2002 ===
In 2002, when then-U.S. Rep. Tony P. Hall decided to accept an appointment as a U.N. ambassador, Richard Alan Carne took his place as the Democratic nominee for the congressional seat. Carne lost the race to former Dayton mayor Michael R. Turner.

=== 2006 election ===
On August 13, 2006, Democratic candidate Stephanie Studebaker— who was the party's nominee to run against the incumbent Republican— was arrested, alongside her husband, on charges of domestic violence. Two days later, she withdrew from the race, leaving the Ohio Democratic Party without a candidate in the district. A special primary election to select a new Democratic candidate was held on 15 September 2006. Richard Chema won that election with nearly 75% of the vote, but lost to Republican Michael R. Turner in the general election.

=== 2010 ===
Ohio's 3rd Congressional District election (2010)
Party	Candidate	Votes	%
**Republican**	**Mike Turner***	**152,629**	**68.11**
Democratic	Joe Roberts	71,455	31.89
Total votes		**224,084**	**100.00**
Turnout			
Republican **hold**			

=== 2012 ===
Ohio's 3rd congressional district (2012)
Party	Candidate	Votes	%
**Democratic**	**Joyce Beatty**	**201,897**	**68.3**
Republican	Chris Long	77,901	26.3
Libertarian	Richard Ehrbar	9,462	3.2
Green	Bob Fitrakis	6,387	2.2
Independent	Jeff Brown (write-in)	5	0.0
Total votes		**295,652**	**100.0**
Democratic **gain** from Republican			

=== 2014 ===
Ohio's 3rd congressional district (2014)
Party	Candidate	Votes	%
**Democratic**	**Joyce Beatty (incumbent)**	**91,769**	**64.1**
Republican	John Adams	51,475	35.9
Independent	Ralph A. Applegate (write-in)	17	0.0
Total votes		**143,261**	**100.0**
Democratic **hold**			

=== 2016 ===
Ohio's 3rd congressional district (2016)
Party	Candidate	Votes	%
**Democratic**	**Joyce Beatty (incumbent)**	**199,791**	**68.6**
Republican	John Adams	91,560	31.4
Total votes		**291,351**	**100.0**
Democratic **hold**			

=== 2018 ===
Ohio's 3rd congressional district (2018)
Party	Candidate	Votes	%
**Democratic**	**Joyce Beatty (incumbent)**	**181,575**	**73.6**
Republican	Jim Burgess	65,040	26.4
Independent	Millie Milam (write-in)	62	0.0
Total votes		**246,677**	**100.0**
Democratic **hold**			

=== 2020 ===
Ohio's 3rd congressional district (2020)
Party	Candidate	Votes	%
**Democratic**	**Joyce Beatty (incumbent)**	**227,420**	**70.8**
Republican	Mark Richardson	93,569	29.2
Write-in		103	0.0
Total votes		**321,092**	**100.0**
Democratic **hold**			

=== 2022 ===
Ohio's 3rd congressional district (2022)
Party	Candidate	Votes	%
**Democratic**	**Joyce Beatty (incumbent)**	**182,324**	**70.5**
Republican	Lee Stahley	76,455	29.5
Write-in		18	0.0
Total votes		**258,797**	**100.0**
Democratic **hold**			

=== 2024 ===
Ohio's 3rd congressional district (2024)
Party	Candidate	Votes	%
**Democratic**	**Joyce Beatty (incumbent)**	**243,991**	**71.5**
Republican	Michael Young	97,389	28.5
Total votes		**341,380**	**100.0**
Democratic **hold**			

== See also ==
- Ohio's congressional districts
- List of United States congressional districts
