= Byron Harlan =

Byron Harlan may refer to:

- Byron B. Harlan (1886–1949), American politician
- Byron G. Harlan (1861–1936), American singer
