= Nicholsville, Ohio =

Unincorporated community in Ohio, U.S.

- Unincorporated community
- Location within Ohio
- Coordinates: 38°57′30″N 84°10′9″W
- Country: United States
- State: Ohio
- County: Clermont

Nicholsville is an unincorporated community in Clermont County, in the U.S. state of Ohio.

== History ==
Nicholsville was originally called Feetown, and under the latter name was platted in 1842, and named for Daniel Fee, who kept the first store there. The town site was replatted in 1847, and the name was changed to Nicholsville, after Nathan B. Nichols, the store's new proprietor. A post office called Nicholsville was established in 1846, and remained in operation until 1906.

== Notable person ==
- Raymond H. Burke, Ohio congressman
