= Edward Joseph Gardner =

American politician

Edward J. Gardner
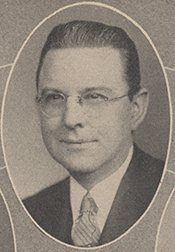

Member of the U.S. House of Representatives from Ohio's 3rd district
- In office January 3, 1945 – January 3, 1947
- Preceded by: Harry P. Jeffrey
- Succeeded by: Raymond H. Burke

Member of the Ohio House of Representatives
- In office 1937–1938; 1941–1942

Personal details
- Born: Edward Joseph Gardner; August 7, 1898 Hamilton, Ohio
- Died: December 7, 1950 (aged 52) Hamilton, Ohio
- Resting place: St. Mary's Cemetery
- Party: Democratic
- Education: Xavier University; Wharton School of Business; University of Cincinnati

Military service
- Allegiance: United States
- Branch/service: United States Army
- Years of service: 1918
- Rank: private
- Battles/wars: World War I

Edward Joseph Gardner (August 7, 1898 – December 7, 1950) was an American businessman, World War I veteran and politician who served one term as a member of the United States House of Representatives from Ohio's third congressional district from 1945 to 1947.

== Early life and family ==
Gardner was born in Hamilton, Ohio, the son of Edward Gardner and his wife Mary. His father came from Ireland as a child and his mother was born in Ohio.

=== Education ===
He attended the local parochial schools and was graduated from the College of Commerce and Finance of St. Xavier University in 1920. He did graduate work at Wharton School of Business of the University of Pennsylvania at Philadelphia and at the University of Cincinnati.

=== World War I ===
During the First World War, Gardner served as a private in the United States Army in 1918.

== Career ==
After the war, he took a job as district controller of a food distributing company at Philadelphia, Pennsylvania for four years and then worked as a public accountant at Hamilton, Ohio, from 1924 until his death in 1950.

=== Early political career ===
In 1926, Gardner was elected to the Hamilton city council serving as president and vice mayor for two years. He was elected a member of the Ohio House of Representatives in 1937 and again in 1941, serving two-year terms.

=== Congress ===
In 1944, he was elected as a Democrat to the Seventy-ninth Congress. During his campaign Edward J. Gardner told fellow Democrats that he would work honestly and ceaselessly for employment of returning servicemen. "We must make a positive determination that there shall be jobs and wages, that there should be security from unemployment, thereby setting a market for production," he said. During his term, he supported a temporary extension of wartime price controls and the draft and the right to strike.

President Truman's unpopularity overshadowed his reelection campaign in 1946 and he was defeated.

== Later career and death ==
Returning to Hamilton, he continued his profession as a public accountant after his congressional service.

=== Death and burial ===
Edward Joseph Gardner died in Hamilton in 1950 and was interred in St. Mary's Cemetery.

== Sources ==
- United States Congress. "Edward Joseph Gardner (id: G000051)". Biographical Directory of the United States Congress.
- "World War II – On The Home Front" Dayton Daily News (OH) October 9, 1994 page, 1B.
- Reston, James. "Cleveland a Democrat Bridgehead But Rest of Ohio Seems GOP Camp," New York Times, Oct 19, 1946, pg. 10.

U.S. House of Representatives
Preceded by Harry P. Jeffrey	U.S. Representative from Ohio's 3rd district 1945–1947	Succeeded by Raymond H. Burke
