= Robert M. Nevin =

American politician (1850–1912)

Robert L. Nevin
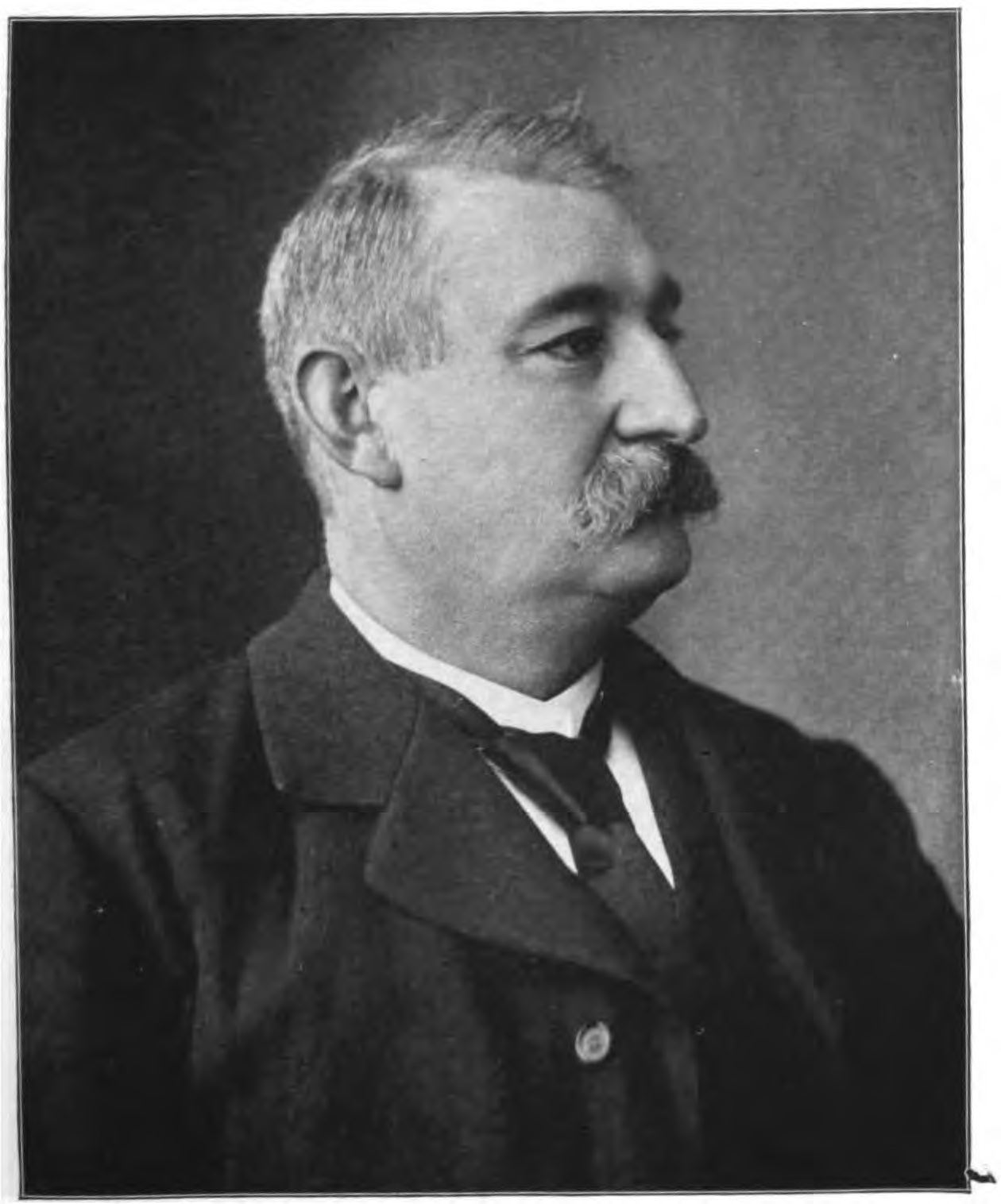

Member of the U.S. House of Representatives from Ohio's 3rd district
- In office March 4, 1901 – March 3, 1907
- Preceded by: John Lewis Brenner
- Succeeded by: J. Eugene Harding

Personal details
- Born: Robert Murphy Nevin; May 5, 1850 Danville, Ohio
- Died: December 17, 1912 (aged 62) Dayton, Ohio
- Resting place: Woodland Cemetery
- Party: Republican
- Spouse: Emma Reasoner
- Education: Ohio Wesleyan University
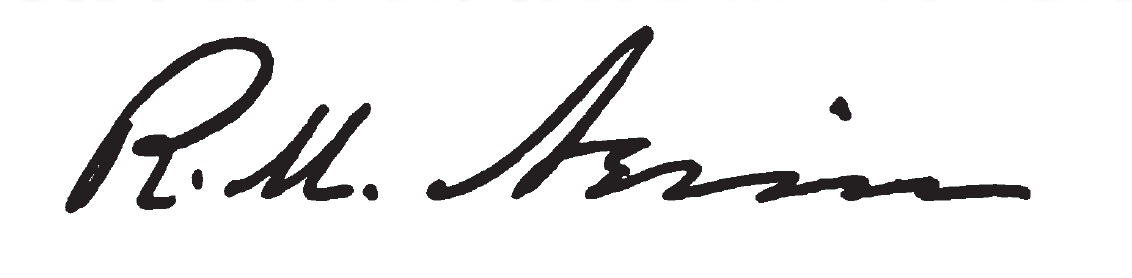
- Signature

Robert Murphy Nevin (May 5, 1850 – December 17, 1912) was an American attorney and three-term member of the United States House of Representatives from Ohio from 1901 to 1907.

== Biography ==
Robert M. Nevin was born in Danville, Ohio, the son of Robert and Frances E. (Eakin) Nevin. His father was a merchant and the first postmaster in Highland County, Ohio. He attended the public schools in Hillsboro, Ohio and was graduated from the Ohio Wesleyan University in June 1868.

After graduation, Robert M. Nevin moved to Dayton, Ohio, where he pursued the study of law under the tutelage of Thomas O. Lowe. When Lowe was elected to the bench of the superior court, Nevin entered the office of Conover & Craighead, well-known attorneys, where he completed his study of law until admitted to the bar in Montgomery County, Ohio in 1871.

=== Family ===
In November 1871, Robert Murphy Nevin was united in marriage to Miss Emma Reasoner of Dresden, Ohio. They had four children.

=== Legal career ===
In 1876, Robert Nevin entered into professional partnership with Alvin W. Kumler, and the firm of Nevin & Kumler was maintained until the election of Kumler as judge of the Montgomery County Court of Common Pleas, by which time it was the oldest continuous law partnership in south central Ohio. R. M. Nevin was a distinguished criminal lawyer and occupied a prominent place at the Ohio bar as counsel for the New York Central Railroad for thirty years (1882–1912).

=== Early political activities ===
Robert M. Nevin was a lifelong Republican, very active in state and local politics, and served as chairman of the Republican county committee of Montgomery County. He was a delegate to 14 Republican state conventions in 15 years, his name being put in nomination for Secretary of State and Governor at different times. In 1893, he nominated William McKinley for Governor of Ohio at the state convention in Columbus, Ohio. Nevin was a delegate to the Republican National Convention in 1892.

=== Congress ===
R. M. Nevin was elected as a Republican as prosecuting attorney of Montgomery County and served from 1887 to 1890. He was narrowly defeated for Congress from Ohio's third district in 1896. In 1900, he was elected as a Republican to the Fifty-seventh, and re-elected to the Fifty-eighth and Fifty-ninth Congresses.

=== Later life ===
He declined renomination in 1906, resuming the practice of law in Dayton. He was a Mason, Knight Templar and Scottish Rite, an Odd Fellow, a Knight of Pythias and a member of the society of Elks.

=== Death and burial ===
Robert Murphy Nevin died in Dayton in 1912 and was interred in Woodland Cemetery, Dayton, Ohio.

== Sources ==
- United States Congress. "Robert M. Nevin (id: N000057)". Biographical Directory of the United States Congress.
- History of the Republican Party in Ohio. Chicago: Lewis Pub. Co., 1898, 1579 pgs.
- Gilkey, Elliot Howard, The Ohio Hundred Year Book. Columbus: F.J. Heer, state printer, 1901, 779 pgs.
- Conover, Frank, editor. Centennial Portrait and Biographical Record of the City of Dayton and of Montgomery County, Ohio Logansport, IN: A. W. Bowen & Co. (Press of Wilson, Humphreys & Co.), 1897, 1310 pages.

U.S. House of Representatives
Preceded by John Lewis Brenner	U.S. Representative from Ohio's 3rd district 1901 - 1907	Succeeded by J. Eugene Harding
