= Harry P. Jeffrey =

American politician

Harry Palmer Jeffrey
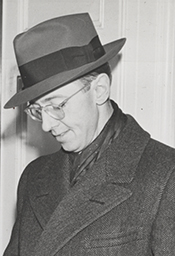

Member of the U.S. House of Representatives from Ohio's 3rd district
- In office January 3, 1943 – January 3, 1945
- Preceded by: Greg J. Holbrock
- Succeeded by: Edward Joseph Gardner

Personal details
- Born: December 26, 1901 Dayton, Ohio
- Died: January 4, 1997 (aged 95) Dayton, Ohio
- Resting place: Woodlawn Cemetery
- Party: Republican
- Education: Ohio State University; Ohio State University College of Law

Military service
- Branch/service: United States Army Reserve
- Years of service: 1927-1930
- Rank: second lieutenant

Harry Palmer Jeffrey (December 26, 1901 – January 4, 1997) was an attorney and one-term member of the United States House of Representatives from Ohio from 1943 to 1945.

== Early life and career ==
Harry P. Jeffrey was born in Dayton, Ohio, the son of a department store manager, Samuel Jeffrey and his wife Grace. Harry Jeffrey attended Dayton's Patterson Grade School and graduated from Steele High School. He graduated from Ohio State University in 1924, and from the College of Law of the same university in 1926.

Jeffrey was admitted to the bar in 1926 and commenced practice in Columbus, Ohio. He moved back to Dayton in 1927 and continued the practice of law, joining the firm of Iddings & Iddings to form Iddings & Jeffrey. Jeffrey built on their practice providing legal services to entrepreneurs and business enterprises by expanding into litigation, personal injury and divorce.

Jeffrey was a second lieutenant in the United States Army Reserve Corps from 1927 to 1930.

He became special assistant attorney general of Ohio from 1933 to 1936.

== Congress ==
In the 1942 mid-term election, Jeffrey was elected as a Republican to the Seventy-eighth Congress from Ohio's 3rd congressional district. As a member of the House Veterans Committee, Jeffrey was one of several authors of the G. I. Bill of Rights, which provided benefits to veterans returning from World War II, including loans that enabled military veterans to get a college education. He was unsuccessful in his bid for reelection in 1944.

== Later career ==
After his congressional service, Jeffrey resumed the practice of law in Dayton until his retirement in the 1980s. He argued a case before the United States Supreme Court and became a Fellow of the American College of Trial Lawyers. Jeffrey was president of the Dayton Bar Association from 1954 to 1955.

Governor James A. Rhodes appointed Jeffrey to the Advisory Committee of the Wright State Campus of Miami and Ohio State Universities in 1965. When that campus became a full-fledged university, Jeffrey was a trustee of Wright State University from 1967 to 1977. In 1976, he served as chair of the WSU Board of Trustees and retired from the Board in September 1977. He also served on the University Foundation Board of Directors for many years as secretary and then from 1981 to 1983 as president. A scholarship in his memory was established at Wright State.

== Death ==
Jeffrey was a founding member of Fairmont Presbyterian Church in Kettering, Ohio. He died at Dayton Hospice at the age of 95. He is interred with his wife Susan (1912–1986) at Woodland Cemetery, Dayton, Ohio.

== Sources ==
- United States Congress. "Harry P. Jeffrey (id: J000073)". Biographical Directory of the United States Congress.
- "Longtime Lawyer Jeffrey Dies." Dayton Daily News, January 5, 1997, Page 2B.
- “Harry P. Jeffrey -- Ohio Congressman”, The Washington Post, January 10, 1997, Page B7.

U.S. House of Representatives
Preceded by Greg J. Holbrock	Member of the U.S. House of Representatives from Ohio's 3rd congressional district 1943–1945	Succeeded by Edward Joseph Gardner
Honorary titles
Preceded by Newt V. Mills	Oldest living United States representative (Sitting or former); May 15, 1996 – January 4, 1997	Succeeded by Jennings Randolph
