= Elihu S. Williams =

American politician

Elihu Stephen Williams
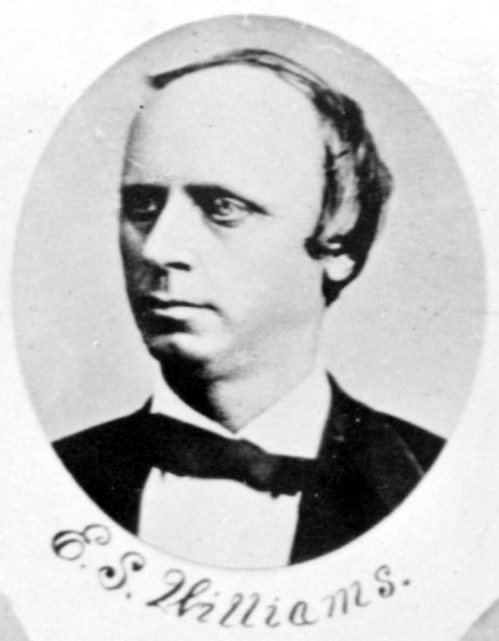

Member of the U.S. House of Representatives from Ohio's 3rd district
- In office March 4, 1887 – March 3, 1891
- Preceded by: James E. Campbell
- Succeeded by: George W. Houk

Personal details
- Born: January 24, 1835 New Carlisle, Ohio, US
- Died: December 1, 1903 (aged 68) Troy, Ohio, US
- Resting place: Riverside Cemetery
- Party: Republican
- Spouse: Alice Gordon
- Children: three
- Education: Antioch College

Military service
- Allegiance: United States
- Branch/service: Union Army
- Rank: Captain
- Unit: 71st Ohio Infantry
- Battles/wars: American Civil War

Elihu Stephen Williams (January 24, 1835 – December 1, 1903) was a farmer, lawyer, soldier, and politician who became a member of the United States House of Representatives from Ohio, serving from 1887 to 1891.

== Biography ==
Elihu S. Williams was born near New Carlisle, Ohio, the son of Henry Williams and Elizabeth Pettigrew, both of Virginia. Elihu Williams worked on his father's farm until 16 years of age, receiving education in the winter at public schools. Not satisfied, he demanded of his father to be sent regularly to school. His father told him if he wanted a better education than he was getting at home, to get it himself. With $1.50 in his pocket, Elihu Williams started out in life for himself.

He worked among the farmers to earn money to pay his board for a few months, then attended Antioch College to pass examination for a teacher's certificate. He taught school the following winter in Brandt, Ohio. In 1858, he commenced reading law in the office of F. P. Cuppy, Esq., of Dayton, Ohio, continuing to teach in winters until February 1861, when he was admitted to practice of law by the Supreme Court of Ohio.

=== Civil War ===
In October 1861, he enlisted as a private in the 71st Ohio Infantry serving for the duration of the Civil War. He was commissioned first lieutenant February 14, 1862. He was in the Battle of Shiloh. He was promoted to captain February 10, 1863. In fall of 1863, he was detailed to the command of the military post at Carthage, Tennessee and remained there until the close of the war. He was elected as a companion of the Ohio Commandery of the Military Order of the Loyal Legion of the United States.

After the war, Capt. Williams remained in Smith County, Tennessee, and engaged in the practice of law. He took an active part in the first convention for the Reconstruction of Tennessee at Nashville. In April 1865, he was commissioned District Attorney for the Sixth Judicial District of Tennessee until the summer of 1867. He resigned to accept the nomination as Republican candidate for the Tennessee House of Representatives, to represent the district of Sumner, Smith and Macon Counties, serving for two years in the Radical Legislature of Tennessee until 1869. He returned to agricultural pursuits at his farm.

On May 31, 1866 Elihu Williams married Alice Gordon, daughter of Dr. Wiley B Gordon and Virginia Russwum. They had 2 children; a third child enumerated as son in 1880 may have been adopted.

=== Congress ===
In 1875, he moved his family to Troy, Ohio, where he established partnership with his brother Henry H. Williams in the practice of law. He also became editor of the newspaper, the Buckeye. In 1886, he was elected as a Republican to the Fiftieth and Fifty-first Congresses from Ohio’s third district.

At the end of his congressional terms, he resumed the practice of law at Troy where he died. He is interred in Riverside Cemetery.

== Sources ==
- United States Congress. "Elihu S. Williams (id: W000496)". Biographical Directory of the United States Congress.
- Taylor, William A. Ohio in Congress from 1803 to 1901. Columbus, Ohio: The XX Century Publishing Company, 1901.
- The History of Miami County, Ohio. Chicago: W. H. Beers & Co., 1880, 854 pages.

U.S. House of Representatives
Preceded by James E. Campbell	U.S. Representative from Ohio's 3rd district 1887–1891	Succeeded by George W. Houk
