= Greg J. Holbrock =

American politician (1906–1992)

Gregory John Holbrock

Member of the U.S. House of Representatives from Ohio's 3rd district
- In office January 3, 1941 – January 3, 1943
- Preceded by: Harry N. Routzohn
- Succeeded by: Harry P. Jeffrey

Personal details
- Born: June 21, 1906 Hamilton, Ohio
- Died: September 4, 1992 (aged 86) Hamilton, Ohio
- Resting place: St. Stephens Mausoleum
- Party: Democratic
- Spouse: Bernice A. Heringer
- Children: 5
- Education: University of Notre Dame; Xavier University; University of Cincinnati College of Law

Military service
- Allegiance: United States
- Branch/service: United States Navy
- Years of service: 1943-1946
- Battles/wars: World War II

Gregory John Holbrock (June 21, 1906 – September 4, 1992) was an American attorney, politician and one-term member of the United States House of Representatives from Ohio from 1941 to 1943.

== Early life and education ==
Holbrock was born in Hamilton, Ohio, the son of George H. and Clara C. (Beck) Holbrock. His father was a shoemaker by trade who became a successful merchant and partner with his younger brother William G. Holbrock in the Holbrock Brothers Dry Goods store in Hamilton and a branch, Middletown Dry Goods, in Middletown, Ohio.

Greg Holbrock attended St. Stephen's parochial school, graduated from St. Xavier High School and attended the University of Notre Dame. He received his Ph.D. from Xavier University in 1928 and his J.D. from the University of Cincinnati College of Law in 1932. Greg Holbrock began the private practice of law in Hamilton. He met Bernice A. Heringer (1909–2005) at Xavier University and on June 1, 1938, they married; they had five children and 10 grandchildren.

== Political career ==
Holbrock was elected from Ohio's third district as a moderate Democrat to the Seventy-seventh Congress and served one term.

He supported $7 billion in aid to Britain, Lend-Lease, and the 1941 amendment to the Neutrality Act to remove restrictions that forbade U.S. vessels from entering combat zones and US citizens from sailing on vessels of belligerents. In 1942, although favored to retain his seat, he was defeated for re-election.

== World War II ==
Following his congressional service, he served in the United States Navy during World War II from 1943 to 1946.

== Later career and death ==
After the war, Holbrock returned to the private practice of law, but remained very active in Democratic politics and was a delegate to the Democratic National Conventions in 1948 and 1960. He became chairman of the Butler County Democratic Executive Committee in 1950 and served sixteen years in that capacity until 1966.

=== Death ===
Greg John Holbrock died in 1992, aged 86, in Hamilton, Ohio. He was interred there with his wife Bernice in St. Stephen's Mausoleum.

U.S. House of Representatives
Preceded by Harry N. Routzohn	U.S. Representative from Ohio's 3rd district 1941 - 1943	Succeeded by Harry P. Jeffrey
