= John Lewis Brenner =

American politician (1832–1906)

John L. Brenner
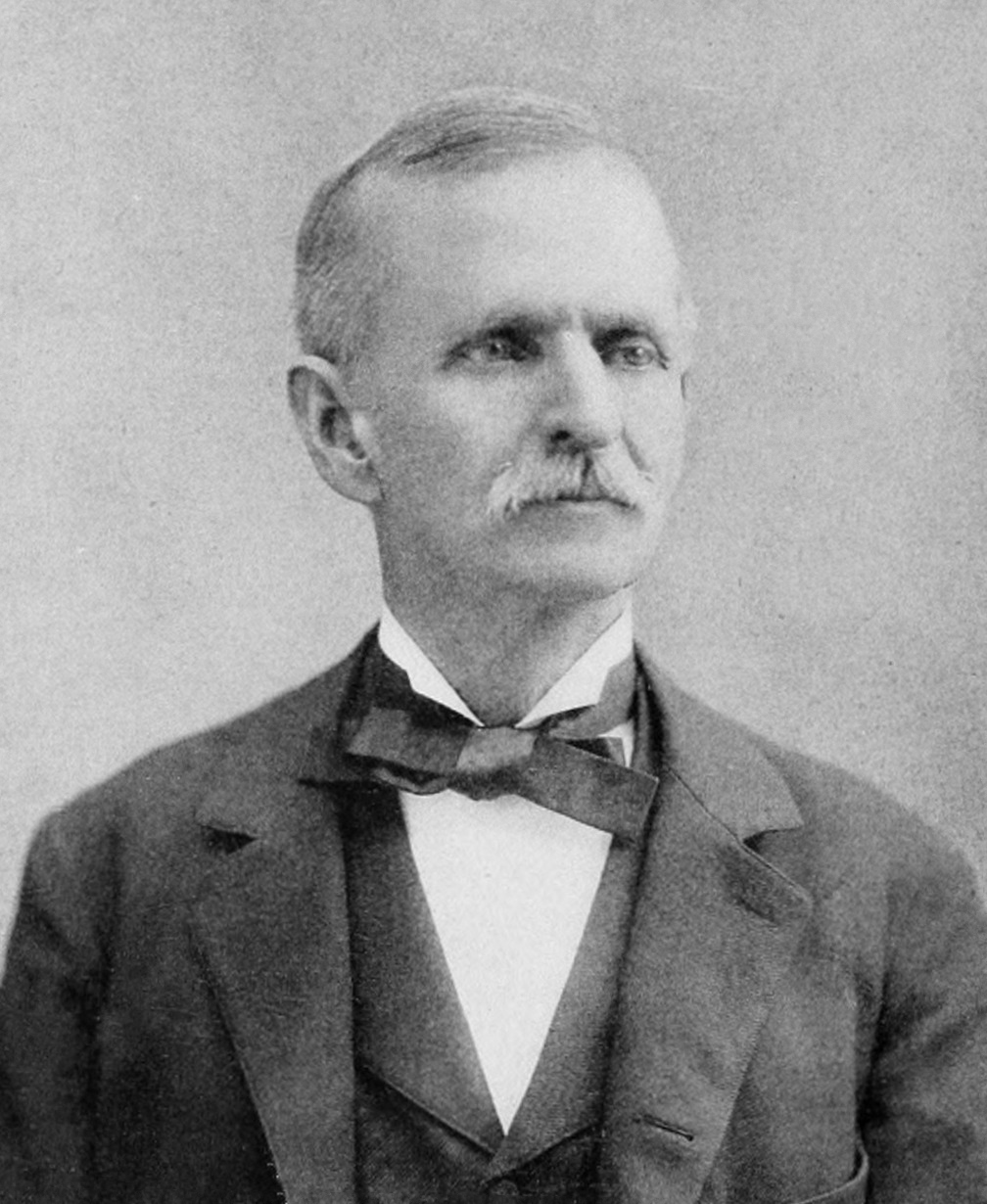

Member of the U.S. House of Representatives from Ohio's 3rd district
- In office March 4, 1897 – March 3, 1901
- Preceded by: Paul J. Sorg
- Succeeded by: Robert M. Nevin

Personal details
- Born: John Lewis Brenner; February 2, 1832 Wayne Township, Montgomery County, Ohio
- Died: November 1, 1906 (aged 74) Dayton, Ohio
- Resting place: Woodland Cemetery
- Party: Democratic
- Profession: Tobacco dealer

John Lewis Brenner (February 2, 1832 – November 1, 1906) was an American farmer, nurseryman, and businessman who served two terms as a member of the United States House of Representatives from Ohio from 1897 to 1901.

== Early life ==
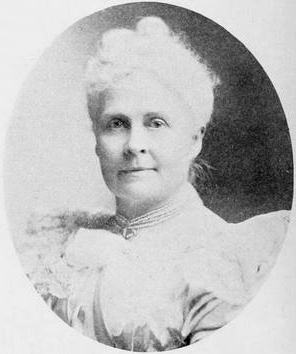
Josephine Moore

John L. Brenner was born in Wayne Township, Montgomery County, Ohio, the son of Jacob S. Brenner and Sarah Ann Matthews. His parents left Virginia because of a dislike of slavery and settled in Ohio; Jacob was a miller and farmer. John Brenner worked on his father's farm in the summer and attended the local public schools in the winter. He finished his education at the Springfield (Ohio) Academy.

John Brenner married Josephine Moore and farmed in Wayne township until 1862.

=== Agriculture business ===
He then became interested in the nursery business which he pursued very successfully until 1872. In 1866, he moved to Dayton, Ohio, then emerging as a center of tobacco agriculture in Ohio, where he became a merchant in leaf tobacco.

== Career ==
John L. Brenner was elected a member of the City of Dayton board of police commissioners, serving from 1885 to 1887. In 1896, Brenner was elected as a Democrat to the Fifty-fifth Congress and re-elected to another term in the Fifty-sixth Congress. Ohio's third district was at the time evenly divided between the two parties, and Mr. Brenner's plurality at each election was barely 100 votes. Brenner was an unsuccessful candidate for renomination in 1900.

== Later life and death ==
After his congressional service, John Lewis Brenner returned to Dayton and resumed his former occupation as a dealer in leaf tobacco. He died in Dayton and was interred in Woodland Cemetery, Dayton, Ohio.

== Sources ==
- United States Congress. "John Lewis Brenner (id: B000801)". Biographical Directory of the United States Congress.
- Taylor, William A. Ohio in Congress from 1803 to 1901. Columbus, Ohio: The XX Century Publishing Company, 1900.
- History of Dayton, Ohio. Dayton, Ohio: United Brethren Publishing House, 1889, 753 pgs.

U.S. House of Representatives
Preceded by Paul J. Sorg	Member of the U.S. House of Representatives from Ohio's 3rd congressional district 1897–1901	Succeeded by Robert M. Nevin
