= Edward G. Breen =

American politician

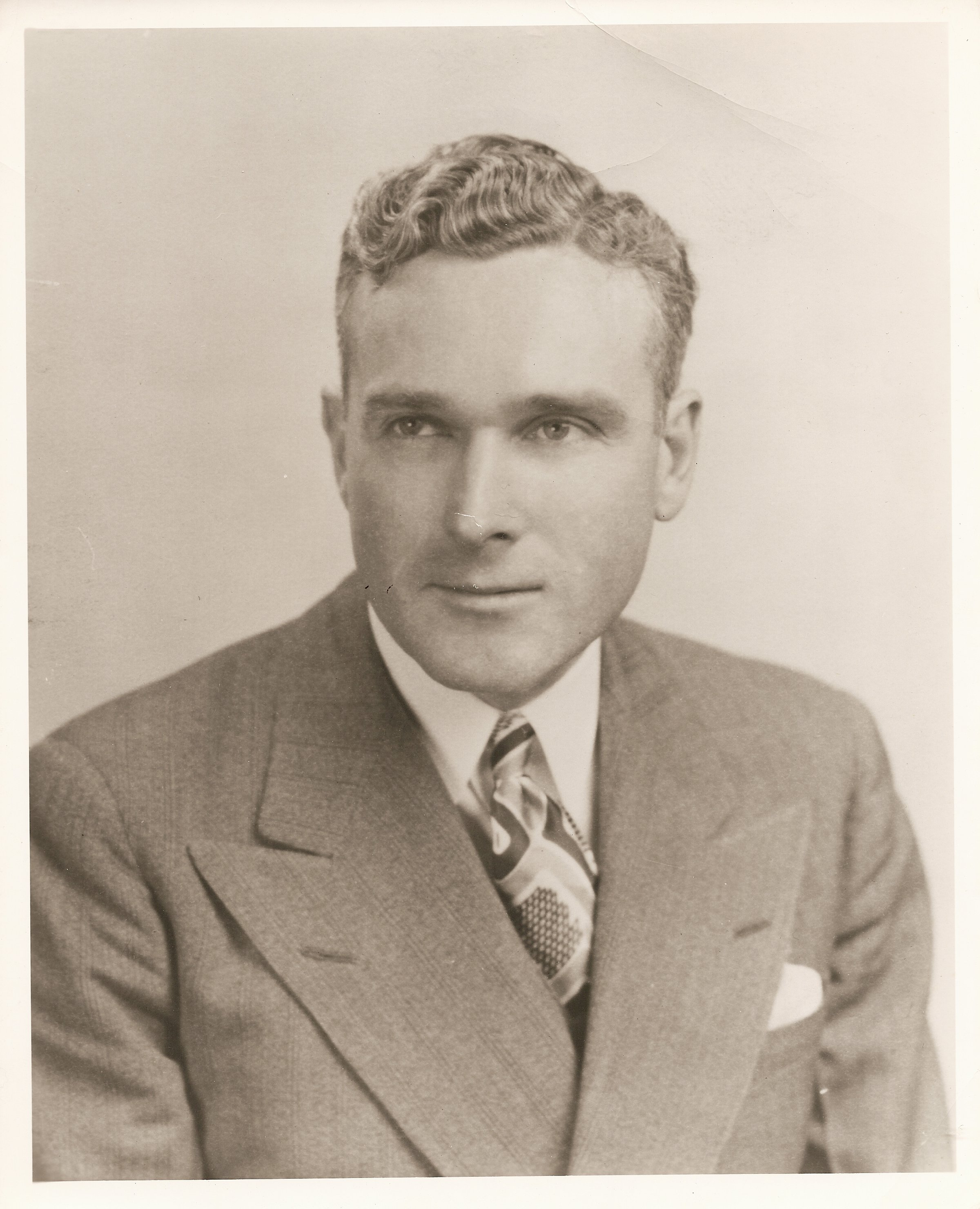

Member of the U.S. House of Representatives from Ohio's 3rd district
- In office January 3, 1949 – October 1, 1951
- Preceded by: Raymond H. Burke
- Succeeded by: Paul F. Schenck

Personal details
- Born: Edward Grimes Breen; June 10, 1908 Dayton, Ohio
- Died: May 8, 1991 (aged 82) Dayton, Ohio
- Resting place: Calvary Cemetery
- Party: Democratic
- Spouse: Constance Focke
- Children: two
- Education: University of Dayton; Ohio State University

Military service
- Allegiance: United States
- Branch/service: United States Army Air Forces
- Battles/wars: World War II

Edward Grimes Breen (June 10, 1908, in Dayton, Ohio – May 8, 1991, in Dayton, Ohio) was an American politician of the Democratic party.

== Biography ==
Ed Breen was born in the Phillips House, a fine old hotel in Dayton, Ohio. He was the son of John P. Breen, manager of the Phillips House.

Breen attended Corpus Christi Grammar School and earned his bachelor's degree from the University of Dayton. After attending Ohio State University, Breen returned to Dayton to work in the hotel business, where he ran the Hilton Biltmore Hotel and later the Van Cleve Hotel.

During the Second World War, Breen, a Roman Catholic by faith, served as a Major (United States) in the United States Army Air Forces. He saw active duty in North Africa and in Italy. He was released from active duty and awarded the rank of lieutenant colonel in the Infantry Reserve.

In 1945, Breen was elected to the Board of Commissioners of Dayton, Ohio. His fellow commissioners elected him mayor.

In 1948, Breen resigned his seat on the city commission in order to seek the Democratic nomination for a seat in the United States House of Representatives. In that election, Breen successfully unseated Republican incumbent Raymond H. Burke. In 1950, Breen won re-election to the House, defeating Republican challenger Paul F. Schenck. However, ill health prompted Breen to resign from his seat early, on October 1, 1951. His old opponent Schenck was elected in a special election in 1951 to complete his term.

Returning to Dayton, Breen worked in the real estate and insurance industries. A few years later, he re-entered politics, running successfully for a seat on the Board of Commissioners of Montgomery County, Ohio, serving in that capacity from 1955 to 1960.

In 1956 he married Constance Focke and they had two children. Edward Grimes Breen is buried at Calvary Cemetery in Dayton. His son has written a book about his father called "Lucky Eddie". http://www.thelocalhistorycompany.com/books/9780977042982/pages/9780977042982.html

== See also ==
- Ohio's 3rd congressional district

Political offices
Preceded by Frank M. Krebs	Mayor of Dayton, Ohio; 1946–1948	Succeeded by Louis W. Lohrey
U.S. House of Representatives
Preceded by Raymond H. Burke	Ohio's 3rd congressional district 1949–1951	Succeeded by Paul F. Schenck
