= Harding-Jones Paper Company District =

Historic district in Ohio, United States

- U.S. National Register of Historic Places
- U.S. Historic district
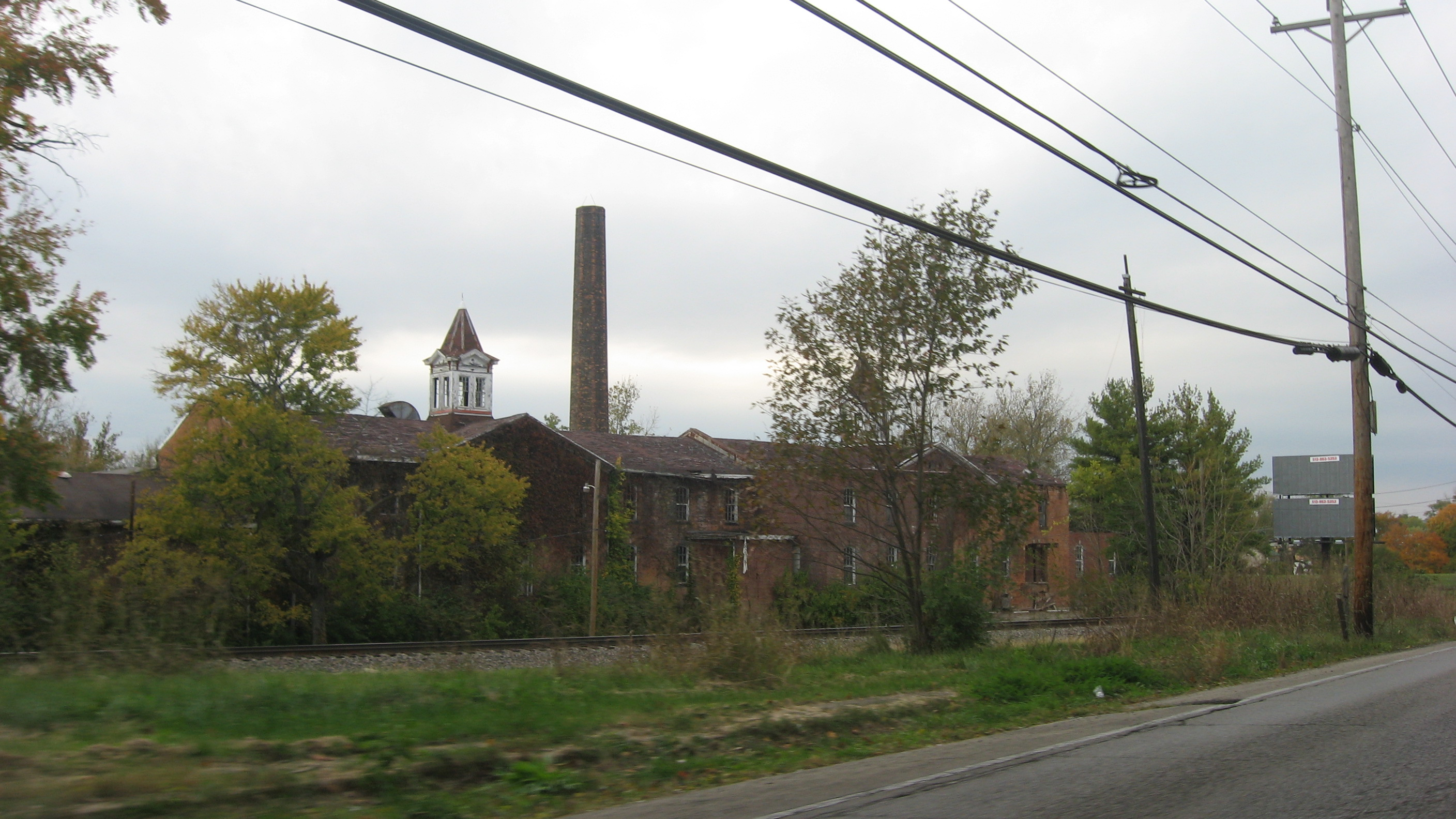
- Buildings on the western side of S. Main St.

- Location within Ohio Location within the United States
- Location: Excello, Ohio
- Coordinates: 39°28′34″N 84°25′14″W
- Area: 180 acres (0.73 km^{2})
- NRHP reference No.: 75001330
- Added to NRHP: 1975-05-29

The Harding-Jones Paper Company District is a registered historic district in Excello, Ohio, listed in the National Register of Historic Places on May 29, 1975. A significant, early example of Ohio industry, the mill was owned by the Harding and Jones families for most of its operation. The mill, adjacent to the first lock completed on the Miami-Erie Canal, also includes two residences, a carriage house, and a canal lock.

== History ==
A.E. Harding, a papermaker from England, cofounded Harding, Erwin & Company in 1865. When Harding's partnership with Erwin ended in 1872, the company became the Harding Paper Company. The company produced a brand of paper called Excello, which lent its name to the growing company town that formed around the paper mill. After A.E. Harding died in 1885, his son, C.M. Harding, and son-in-law Thomas Jones became co-managers. Jones purchased the mill in 1925 and formed the Harding-Jones Paper Company, which became known for its custom-made, watermarked writing paper. The mill shuttered in 1990 due to an aging facility and outdated equipment, and the mill was demolished in 2018 after years of decay and collapse.
