= George W. Houk =

American politician

George Washington Houk
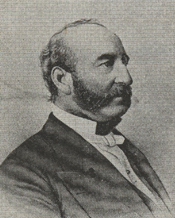

Member of the U.S. House of Representatives from Ohio's 3rd district
- In office March 4, 1891 – February 9, 1894
- Preceded by: Elihu S. Williams
- Succeeded by: Paul J. Sorg

Member of the Ohio House of Representatives from the Montgomery County district
- In office January 5, 1852 – January 1, 1854 Serving with Daniel Beckel
- Preceded by: Thomas Dodds; John E. Thoms
- Succeeded by: William Goudy; Marcus T. Parrott

Personal details
- Born: September 25, 1825 Mount Holly Springs, Pennsylvania
- Died: February 9, 1894 (aged 68) Washington, D.C.
- Resting place: Woodland Cemetery, Dayton, Ohio
- Party: Democratic
- Spouse: Eliza Phillips Thurston
- Children: five

George Washington Houk (September 25, 1825 – February 9, 1894) was a lawyer and politician representing Ohio in the U.S. House of Representatives from 1891 until his death in 1894.

== Early life and career ==
George W. Houk was born near Mount Holly Springs in Cumberland County, Pennsylvania, the son of Adam and Catherine (Knisley) Houk. The family moved to Dayton, Ohio in 1827 where George Houk attended the public schools and the E. E. Barney Academy at Dayton. For a number of years Houk taught school while he studied law with Peter P. Lowe. George W. Houk was admitted to the bar in 1847, commencing practice in Dayton.

In 1856 he married Eliza Phillips Thruston (23 October 1833 – 31 August 1914), daughter of Robert A. and Mary (Phillips) Thruston, both of locally prominent families. They had five children.

In 1861, he became a law partner of John A. McMahon, who had previously been a law partner of Clement Vallandigham. He remained in that partnership until 1882.

== Political career ==
Houk was elected a member of the Ohio House of Representatives, serving from 1852 to 1854. He was a delegate to the Democratic National Convention in 1860 supporting Stephen A. Douglas and a delegate again in 1876. He was defeated for circuit judge in the Ohio Second judicial circuit in 1884.

=== Congress ===
In 1888 on the Democratic ticket, he faced incumbent Elihu S. Williams in Ohio's third district, but was defeated. In 1890, he defeated Henry Lee Morey and was elected to the Fifty-second congress. He was easily re-elected in 1892 to the Fifty-second congress.

== Death ==
He died suddenly in Washington, D.C. during his second term. Paul J. Sorg was elected to fill the vacancy in a special election in May 1894.

George Washington Houk and his wife are interred in Woodland Cemetery, Dayton, Ohio.

== See also ==
- List of members of the United States Congress who died in office (1790–1899)

== Sources ==
- United States Congress. "George W. Houk (id: H000816)". Biographical Directory of the United States Congress.
- Taylor, William A. Ohio in Congress from 1803 to 1901. Columbus, Ohio: The XX Century Publishing Company, 1901.

U.S. House of Representatives
Preceded by Elihu S. Williams	U.S. Representative from Ohio's 3rd district 1891 - 1894	Succeeded by Paul J. Sorg
