= Charles W. Whalen Jr. =

American politician

Charles Whalen
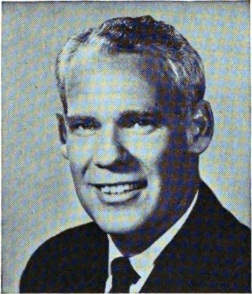

Member of the U.S. House of Representatives from Ohio's 3rd district
- In office January 3, 1967 – January 3, 1979
- Preceded by: Rodney M. Love
- Succeeded by: Tony P. Hall

Member of the Ohio State Senate
- In office 1961–1967

Member of the Ohio House of Representatives
- In office 1955–1961

Personal details
- Born: Charles W. Whalen Jr. July 31, 1920 Dayton, Ohio, U.S.
- Died: June 27, 2011 (aged 90) Bethesda, Maryland, U.S.
- Party: Republican (until 1979) Democratic (1979–2011)
- Education: University of Dayton; Harvard University

Military service
- Allegiance: United States
- Branch/service: United States Army
- Rank: First lieutenant
- Battles/wars: World War II

Charles William Whalen Jr (July 31, 1920 – June 27, 2011) was an American politician from Ohio. Whalen was a member of the Republican Party who served in the Ohio House of Representatives, Ohio State Senate, and the United States House of Representatives. In his six terms in the U.S. House, Whalen established himself in the liberal wing of the Republican Party and led opposition to U.S. involvement in the Vietnam War.

== Early life ==
Born in Dayton, Ohio, Whalen graduated from Oakwood High School, from the University of Dayton with a degree in business administration in 1942, and from Harvard University Graduate School of Business in 1946. He enlisted in the United States Army during World War II and was discharged as a first lieutenant in 1946.

After his discharge from the service, he worked at his father's company, Dayton Dress Company as a vice president from 1946 to 1952, and was a professor of economics and chairman of the department at the University of Dayton from 1962 to 1966.

== Ohio state legislator ==
In 1954, Whalen was elected to the Ohio House of Representatives where he served for three terms until his election to the Ohio State Senate in 1960. He served three terms in the Senate before entering Congress.

In 1962, he unsuccessfully sought the Republican nomination for Lieutenant Governor of Ohio. In a crowded primary, his main opponent in the race was John Brown, a former two-term lieutenant governor who also served as governor for 11 days after the resignation of Frank Lausche. Whalen finished second taking 15.8% of the vote in the six-way primary. As a Senator, Whalen fought for a Fair Housing Law in Ohio.

== U.S. representative ==
Whalen next ran for Congress in 1966. During the election, he walked 880 miles around his district to meet voters. In the general election, he defeated freshman incumbent Rodney Love with 53.8% of the vote.

In five more races, Whalen was never seriously challenged. He won 78% of the vote in 1968, a year when Hubert H. Humphrey won his district. He followed that in 1970 and 1972 with 76% and 74%, respectively. In 1974, a year that the Republicans faced fallout from the Watergate scandal, he was the only Republican with no challengers in the primary or general election.

Whalen had a liberal voting record in the House, although he opposed abortion, due to his Catholic faith. In 1967, he and four other Republicans authored a position paper “How to End the Draft: The Case for an All-Volunteer Army” and introduced legislation to end the draft. He was also an opponent of the Vietnam War who supported legislation to reduce the military budget and to introduce a timetable for the withdrawal of American forces from Vietnam. In 1971, he and Lucien Nedzi introduced the Nedzi-Whalen Amendment to a military procurement bill that would have prohibited the use of funds for the bill to be used in Southeast Asia after the end of 1971. In his final term, he supported efforts to eliminate the B-1 bomber program.

In 1973, Whalen authored the book "Your Right to Know: How the Free Flow of News Depends on the Journalist's Right to Protect His Sources," which has an introduction written by Walter Cronkite.

His voting record increasingly put him at odds with his own party. Congressional Quarterly estimated that, in 1974, he voted against the majority of his party members 72% of the time. In 1977, he acknowledged that he had spoken with the Democratic Party leadership about switching parties. While Ohio state law would have made this difficult, he also considered running as an independent in 1978. Whalen was one of three House Republicans to oppose a tax cut bill sponsored by Jack Kemp (R-NY) and William Roth (R-DE), the other two being Millicent Fenwick (R-NJ) and Paul Findley (R-IL). Ultimately, he decided not to run for re-election in 1978. Whalen was succeeded by Democrat Tony P. Hall. After he left Congress, Whalen switched his party registration to Democratic.

== Later life ==
After his retirement from Congress, Whalen authored two books with his wife Barbara, a former columnist for the Dayton Journal Herald and the voice of Elsie the Cow. The first, "The Longest Debate: A Legislative History of the 1964 Civil Rights Act", chronicled the legislative process behind the passage of the Civil Rights Act. His second book, "The Fighting McCooks – America's Famous Fighting Family", discussed a local family with a long military history.

=== Death ===
Whalen died in Bethesda, Maryland on June 27, 2011. He was 90.

== Sources ==
- United States Congress. "Charles W. Whalen Jr. (id: W000317)". Biographical Directory of the United States Congress.
- Whalen, Charles W. Jr. and Barbara Whalen. The Longest Debate: A Legislative History of the 1964 Civil Rights Act. Cabin John, MD: Seven Locks Press, 1985.

U.S. House of Representatives
Preceded by Rodney M. Love	Member of the U.S. House of Representatives from Ohio's 3rd congressional district 1967-1979	Succeeded by Tony P. Hall
