= Raymond H. Burke =

American politician

Raymond Hugh Burke
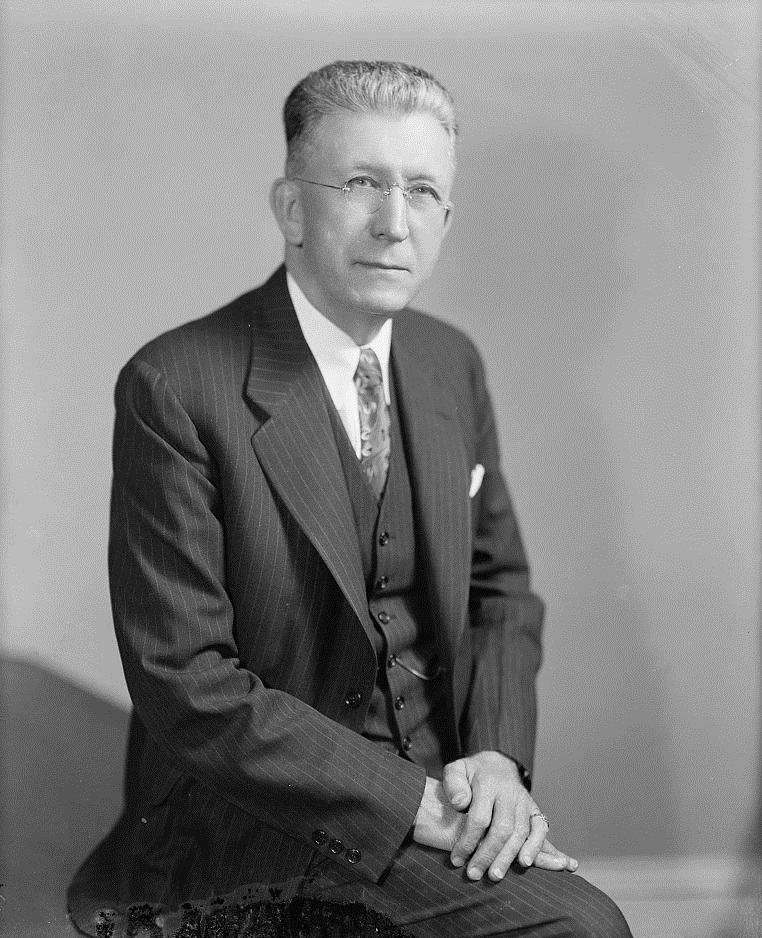

Member of the U.S. House of Representatives from Ohio's 3rd district
- In office January 3, 1947 – January 3, 1949
- Preceded by: Edward J. Gardner
- Succeeded by: Edward G. Breen

Personal details
- Born: November 4, 1881 Nicholsville, Ohio
- Died: August 18, 1954 (aged 72) Hamilton, Ohio
- Resting place: Greenwood Cemetery (Hamilton, Ohio)
- Party: Republican
- Spouse: Daisy Minnich
- Children: One
- Education: Oberlin College; University of Chicago

Raymond Hugh Burke (November 4, 1881 – August 18, 1954) was a teacher, businessman and member of the United States House of Representatives from Ohio's third district.

Raymond H. Burke was born in Nicholsville, Ohio, the son of Daniel Fletcher Burke and Mary Jane McNair. Fletcher Burke was born in Iowa and was a farmer, mechanic, and machinist who died in the Cincinnati flood of 1884; Mary McNair Burke died when Raymond was six. Raymond went to Clermont County, Ohio to live with his maternal grandparents. Hugh McNair was born in Scotland worked as a blacksmith and was later a postmaster in Clermont County. There Raymond Burke attended Jackson School and then worked on a farm and in the village while studying to teach in rural schools. He taught at Pendleton School near Point Pleasant, Ohio in 1899 and 1900. He was a student at Oberlin Academy (1900–02) and Oberlin College (1902–05) to get a teaching certificate and was graduated with a Bachelor of Science from the University of Chicago in 1906.

Raymond Burke was an instructor in geography, assistant professor of geology and director of music at Miami University from 1906 until 1915 and continuing some post-graduate work at the University of Chicago in the summer sessions. He wrote both the lyrics and music for the "Miami March Song," the chorus of which is the current Fight Song for Miami University. The tune was adapted in 1919 for Wave the Flag, the University of Chicago's fight song. He also composed the music for "Old Miami," the alma mater song, and the "Miami Scalp Song," which was the background music for the Miami Indian dance at athletic contests until the mascot was changed to the Redhawks. Burke organized the Miami University Men's Glee Club in 1907. It held its first performance in February 1908, ending the concert with the premiere of Burke's songs that are now known as the university's fight song and alma mater. The Miami Men's Glee Club continues this tradition today, ending its annual fall and spring concerts with the fight song and alma mater. After the great success of the Glee Club, he organized other singing groups for women and for men and women singing together that still survive at Miami University.

On June 24, 1908, Raymond H. Burke married Daisy Minnich, a graduate of the Teachers College of Miami University. They had one son, Robert McNair Burke.

== Career ==
=== Local Politics ===
Raymond Burke was personnel and employment manager for The Hooven-Owens-Rentschler Company tool works, a major Hamilton, Ohio employer, from 1918 to 1923. He then became secretary-treasurer of the Fort Hamilton Automobile agency for three years. He was a special representative at Hamilton for Northwestern Mutual Life Insurance Company for the remainder of his life.

Raymond H. Burke was one of the fifteen members elected to a charter commission in November 1925 to write a new city charter for Hamilton. The commission proposed the council-manager form of government and the charter was adopted in 1926. In 1927, Burke was elected to Hamilton city council and reelected for a total of seven terms through 1942. He served as mayor of Hamilton the first twelve of those years.

=== State and National Politics ===
Raymond H. Burke was elected to the Ohio Senate in 1942, serving one four-year term, after which he was elected as a Republican to the Eightieth Congress. He served on the House Committee on Merchant Marine and Fisheries. A month after the House was organized, all twelve members of the committee were off to inspect the Panama Canal, concerned that aircraft carriers were now too wide to pass through the Canal. He also served as chairman of the subcommittee on conservation and wildlife resources. Burke had one bill enacted; it enabled the War Assets Administration to transfer surplus land for wildlife conservation.

Burke was defeated in his reelection attempt in 1948. He returned to Hamilton and was a lecturer in the finance department of Miami University in 1949 and 1950.

Burke was a Rotarian and a Mason. He was also active in the YMCA and local Council of the Boy Scouts of America. He was director of a Presbyterian church choir from 1915 until his death.

Burke died in Hamilton in 1954 and was interred in Greenwood Cemetery.

== Sources ==
- United States Congress. "Raymond H. Burke (id: B001096)". Biographical Directory of the United States Congress.
- Ohio: a four-volume reference library on the history of a great state. Chicago: Lewis Publishing Co., 1937, 2520 pgs.
- Blount, Jim. "Raymond Burke composed Miami songs." Hamilton Journal-News, September 14, 1992.
- Blount, Jim. "Raymond H. Burke also political success." Hamilton Journal-News, September 21, 1992.

U.S. House of Representatives
Preceded by Edward J. Gardner	U.S. Representative from Ohio's 3rd district 1947–1949	Succeeded by Edward G. Breen
