= Harry N. Routzohn =

American politician

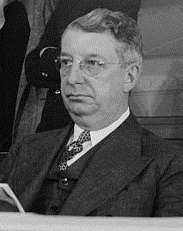
- in Washington, D.C., December 11, 1939

Member of the U.S. House of Representatives from Ohio's 3rd district
- In office January 3, 1939 – January 3, 1941
- Preceded by: Byron B. Harlan
- Succeeded by: Greg J. Holbrock

Personal details
- Born: Harry Nelson Routzohn; November 4, 1881 Dayton, Ohio
- Died: April 14, 1953 (aged 71) Washington, D.C.
- Resting place: Memorial Park Cemetery, Dayton, Ohio
- Party: Republican
- Spouse: Laura Eleanor Poock
- Children: four

Harry Nelson Routzohn (November 4, 1881 – April 14, 1953) was an attorney, jurist and member of the United States House of Representatives from Ohio for one term from 1939 to 1941.

== Biography ==
Routzohn was born in Dayton, Ohio, the son of Henry and Mary Routzohn. Henry was a teamster man from Maryland. Harry Routzohn attended the Dayton public grade schools. He apprenticed one year at the blacksmith trade and then became a court page in Court of Common Pleas of Montgomery County, Ohio.

=== Family ===
About 1902, Harry Nelson Routzohn married Laura Eleanor Pock; they had four children. He studied law and was admitted to the bar in 1904, hanging out his shingle in Dayton.

=== Early career ===
In 1902, Harry Routzohn was one of the founders of the Humane Society of Dayton, the second oldest humane organization in Ohio and one of the oldest in the nation. He served on the governing board with Byron B. Harlan and other prominent Daytonians.

Harry Routzohn became assistant county prosecutor of Montgomery County in 1906 serving for three years. In 1917, he became a probate judge, in which position he served for twelve years until 1929. While on the court, he taught law at the University of Dayton from 1923 to 1930. Routzohn was a captain in the Officers' Reserve Corps from 1925 to 1935.

He was a delegate to the Republican National Conventions in 1928 and 1932. In 1928, he broke with the Ohio delegation, which announced prior to the convention its intention to support favorite son Senator Frank B. Willis of Ohio. Routzohn announced that he would start a movement in behalf of Herbert Hoover in the Third Ohio District on the grounds that the State Committee usurped authority in endorsing Willis to the exclusion of all others. In 1930, he was appointed assistant United States district attorney by President Hoover and served until the election of Roosevelt in 1932.

After 1932, he returned to private practice, and became associate counsel of the Brotherhood of Carpenters, of the American Federation of Labor (AFL).

=== Congress ===
In 1938, he was elected as a Republican from Ohio's third congressional district to the Seventy-sixth Congress. He was aligned closely with the isolationist, conservative wing of the Republican party and was a reliable vote against New Deal legislation. He voted against lifting the arms embargo of the Neutrality Act even as the outbreak of hostilities in Europe neared in the summer of 1939 and against the Selective Service Act in 1940. He voted against the Townsend Old Age Pension Bill and voted for the Hatch Act of 1939 to restrict participation of government employees in political activities.

Routzohn gained the most notoriety of his congressional service in the last year of his term. Since 1935, the AFL had charged that the National Labor Relations Board was pro-CIO and the CIO had protested decisions favorable to the AFL. The criticisms of the Board by business and labor came to a head during a series of hearings, ostensibly to shape amendments to the Wagner Act, conducted by Representative Howard W. Smith from December 1939 to December 1940. Smith, a leader of the conservative bloc of the Democratic party, charged the NLRB with a pro-union bias. He also claimed the agency was dominated by left-wingers and had been infiltrated by Communists. Harry N. Routzohn's selection to the committee was seen as holding the balance of the five-man committee and as an unknown quantity, since as a congressional freshman he had no voting record on labor legislation. On the one hand his sympathies clearly lay with labor because of his long service as AFL counsel, and so was thought unlikely to support amendments that would weaken the protection of unionization of the Wagner Act. On the other hand, he had shown little sympathy with the Roosevelt administration's method of dealing with labor problems and, as a former AFL attorney, he was likely to probe charges of CIO favoritism on the part of the board.

The hearings generated headlines every time they were convened. Future NLRB Judge Fannie M. Boyls, a 1929 graduate of the University of Texas School of Law, was one of several female Review Section attorneys called to testify before the Smith Committee by its general counsel, Edmund M. Toland. Toland's intense dislike of the NLRB was displayed in his examination: Toland shouted at them. Representative Routzohn asked them personally insulting questions. Congressman Clare Eugene Hoffman of Michigan ridiculed them on the floor of the House—not the last time such attitudes would be exhibited in Congress:

Those girls who are acting as reviewing attorneys for the Board are fine young ladies. ... but the chances are 99 out of 100 that none of them ever changed a diaper, hung a washing, or baked a loaf of bread. None of them has had any judicial or industrial experience to qualify her for the job they are trying to do, and yet here they are — after all — good looking, intelligent appearing as they may be, and well groomed all of them, writing the opinions on which the jobs of hundreds of thousands of men depend and upon which the success or failure of an industrial enterprise may depend and we stand for it.

In August 1940, the Hon. Harry N. Routzohn was one of the speakers at the dedication of Wilbur and Orville Wright Memorial at Dayton. He was defeated for a second term in November 1940.

=== Later career ===
After his service in Congress, he again resumed the practice of law in Dayton. He was President of the Dayton Bar Association for one term, 1941–42.

In 1944, Routzohn backed efforts to put a labor leader on the Republican ticket for vice president to "win labor back to the party." Routzohn headed a special committee that decided to place William L. Hutcheson, president of the United Brotherhood of Carpenters and Joiners of America, and a vice president of the AFL, in nomination at the convention. Asserting that the selection of Mr. Hutcheson would refute the "smear" that the Republican party was anti-labor, Routzohn said Hutcheson would carry the "rank and file" of the labor vote with him for the Republicans and that leaders of the AFL would give their support, that contractors and employers who have dealt with Hutcheson's union would endorse the selection, and that support also would be forthcoming from farm leaders and rural organizations. "The choice of Mr. Hutcheson would offset New Deal influence in labor States. It would also furnish a Vice Presidential candidate from the Middle West," said Routzohn. However, the nomination went to Sen. John W. Bricker of Ohio.

=== Eisenhower administration ===
May 3, 1953, President Eisenhower appointed Harry N. Routzohn Solicitor of Labor, Washington, D.C. Known as a friend of conservative Robert A. Taft, he was expected to be a counterweight to Labor Secretary Martin Patrick Durkin, a Democrat and union official, and the only member of Eisenhower's cabinet who did not support Eisenhower's election. Routzohn was quickly confirmed on March 5 and served from March 6, 1953.

=== Death and burial ===
Harry Routzohn had been the Labor Department's chief legal officer for a month when he suffered an attack and was taken to George Washington University Hospital where he died five days later of a heart ailment. Harry Nelson Routzohn was interred in Memorial Park Cemetery, Dayton, Ohio.

U.S. House of Representatives
Preceded by Byron B. Harlan	Member of the U.S. House of Representatives from Ohio's 3rd congressional district 1939-1941	Succeeded by Greg J. Holbrock
