= Paul F. Schenck =

American politician

Paul Fornshell Schenck
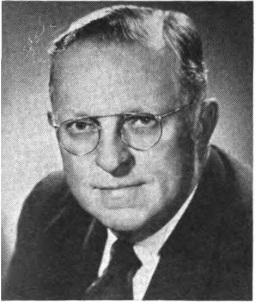

Member of the U.S. House of Representatives from Ohio's 3rd district
- In office November 6, 1951 – January 3, 1965
- Preceded by: Edward G. Breen
- Succeeded by: Rodney M. Love

Personal details
- Born: April 19, 1899 Miamisburg, Ohio, U.S.
- Died: November 30, 1968 (aged 69) Dayton, Ohio, U.S.
- Resting place: Woodland Cemetery
- Party: Republican

Paul Fornshell Schenck (April 19, 1899 – November 30, 1968) was an American educator and politician who served seven terms as a U.S. representative from Ohio from 1951 to 1965.

== Early life and education ==
Born in Miamisburg, Ohio, his family moved to Dayton, Ohio in 1908 where he graduated from Steele High School in 1917. He received two years of college training, and was a student teacher at Steele from 1917 to 1919. He then worked in the automotive service business from 1919 to 1923. After that practical training, he became an automotive training teacher and faculty manager of athletics at Roosevelt High School in Dayton from 1923 to 1929.

== Political career ==
He was the director of recreation for the city of Dayton from 1929 to 1935. In September 1935, during the Great Depression, he established his own real estate, mortgage loan, and insurance business.

He began his public service career when he was elected to the Dayton Board of Education, serving from 1941 to 1950 and president for seven years. He was vice chairman of the Dayton Safety Council in 1946 and 1947 and president of the Dayton Real Estate Board from 1947 to 1949..

=== Congress ===
He was nominated by the Republican party to run for Congress from Ohio's third congressional district in 1950, but was defeated by incumbent Edward G. Breen. Breen resigned in 1951 due to health concerns, and Schenck was subsequently elected in a special election to the 82nd Congress to fill the vacancy. He was reelected to the 83rd and to the five succeeding Congresses (November 6, 1951 – January 3, 1965) but was defeated in 1964 for reelection to the 89th Congress.

==== Tenure ====
Schenck, a member of the Committee on Interstate and Foreign Commerce, introduced a bill in 1957 that would have prohibited the sale of vehicles discharging hydrocarbons in levels found dangerous by the Surgeon General. The bill never made it through Congress in that form. Still, it was a prescient statement at the time about the growing national concern over auto pollution. In 1959, President Eisenhower signed a modified Schenck Act. That law directed the Surgeon General to study the relationship between auto pollution and public health.

Schenck voted in favor of the Civil Rights Acts of 1957, 1960, and 1964.

== Death ==
Paul F. Schenck was a Freemason Knight Templar and member of the Shriners (Antioch Temple), and the Sons of the American Revolution.

He died in Dayton, Ohio in 1968 and is interred in Woodland Cemetery.

U.S. House of Representatives
Preceded by Edward G. Breen	Member of the U.S. House of Representatives from Ohio's 3rd congressional district 1951-1965	Succeeded by Rodney M. Love
