= Rodney M. Love =

American lawyer and politician

Rodney Marvin Love
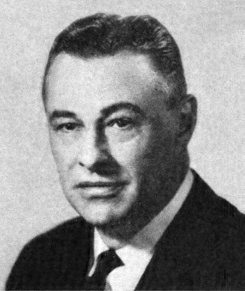

Member of the U.S. House of Representatives from Ohio's 3rd district
- In office January 3, 1965 – January 3, 1967
- Preceded by: Paul F. Schenck
- Succeeded by: Charles W. Whalen Jr.

Personal details
- Born: July 18, 1908 Dayton, Ohio, U.S.
- Died: May 5, 1996 (aged 87) Mesa, Arizona, U.S.
- Party: Democratic
- Education: Ohio State University; University of Dayton Law School

Rodney Marvin Love (July 18, 1908 – May 5, 1996) was an American lawyer and politician who served as a one-term U.S. representative for Ohio's District 3 from 1965 to 1967.

== Early life and career ==
Rodney M. Love was born in Dayton, Ohio, where he graduated from Steele High School in 1926. He was graduated from the Ohio State University, class of 1930, and then attended the University of Dayton Law School where he was graduated in 1933.

=== Early career ===
Love was admitted to the bar in 1933 and commenced practice in Dayton. In 1941, he became chief deputy in Montgomery County, Ohio probate court, a position he held for four years. He was appointed judge of that probate court in 1945 to fill a vacancy, and was subsequently elected in 1946 to fill the partial term and reelected in 1948 and 1954. Love resigned from the bench in 1960 to return to his private law practice.

== Congress ==
Rodney M. Love was elected as a Democrat to the 89th United States Congress (January 3, 1965 – January 3, 1967), but was unsuccessful as a candidate for reelection in 1966 to the Ninetieth Congress.

== Later career ==
In the 1960s, he spoke out against hatred and bigotry. He worked for mental health issues, serving as a Dayton chairman of the Ohio Mental Health Association's chapter and affiliation committee.

Love was elected to Montgomery County (Ohio) Common Pleas Court in 1968 and reelected in 1974, serving until 1980. In retirement, he served by appointment of the Ohio Supreme Court as an active judge.

== Death ==
Rodney M. Love suffered a stroke in Dayton in 1993 and died May 5, 1996, in Mesa, Arizona.

== Sources ==
- United States Congress. "Rodney M. Love (id: L000458)". Biographical Directory of the United States Congress.
- Denger, Laurie. "Judge Love Dies; He Was Called 'One Of A Kind'" Dayton Daily News, May 7, 1996, page 1B.

U.S. House of Representatives
Preceded by Paul F. Schenck	Member of the U.S. House of Representatives from Ohio's 3rd congressional district 1965–1967	Succeeded by Charles W. Whalen, Jr.
