= J. Eugene Harding =

American politician (1877–1959)

John E. Harding
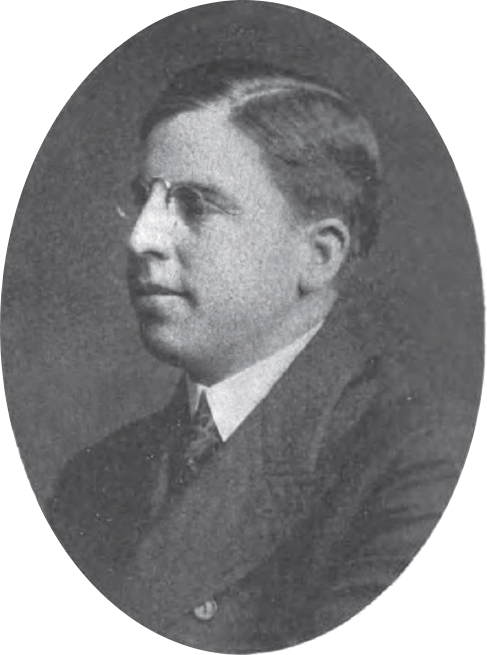

Member of the U.S. House of Representatives from Ohio's 3rd district
- In office March 4, 1907 – March 3, 1909
- Preceded by: Robert M. Nevin
- Succeeded by: James M. Cox

Member of the Ohio Senate from the 2nd and 4th district
- In office January 4, 1904 – December 31, 1905
- Preceded by: W F Roudebush
- Succeeded by: Isaac E. Huffman

Personal details
- Born: John Eugene Harding; June 27, 1877 Excello, Ohio
- Died: July 26, 1959 (aged 82) New Haven, Connecticut
- Resting place: Woodside Cemetery, Middletown, Ohio
- Party: Republican
- Education: University of Michigan

John Eugene Harding (June 27, 1877 – July 26, 1959) was a businessman and one-term member of the United States House of Representatives from Ohio from 1907 to 1909.

== Early life and career ==
Harding was born in Excello, Ohio, the son of paper manufacturer Abram E. Harding and his wife Christine. He attended the public schools in nearby Amanda Village, and the Pennsylvania Military Academy at Chester. He graduated from the University of Michigan.

He engaged in business and industrial enterprises in Middletown, Ohio, including the family paper business, Harding Paper Company, which had a mill at Excello.

== Congress ==
He was elected member of the Ohio Senate in 1902. In 1906 he was elected as a Republican to the Sixtieth Congress from Ohio's Third District. He was defeated as an independent candidate in 1908. He was a delegate to the Republican State convention in 1910.

== Later career ==
Retiring from public service, he engaged in the paper business in Chicago, Illinois, until he moved to New York City, where he was associated with the Pure Oil Co. from 1921 to 1926. He engaged in industrial enterprises until he retired in 1949.

== Death and burial ==
Harding died in New Haven, Connecticut, aged 82. He was interred in Woodside Cemetery, Middletown, Ohio.

U.S. House of Representatives
Preceded by Robert M. Nevin	Member of the U.S. House of Representatives from Ohio's 3rd congressional district 1907-1909	Succeeded by James M. Cox
