= Byron B. Harlan =

American politician

Byron Berry Harlan
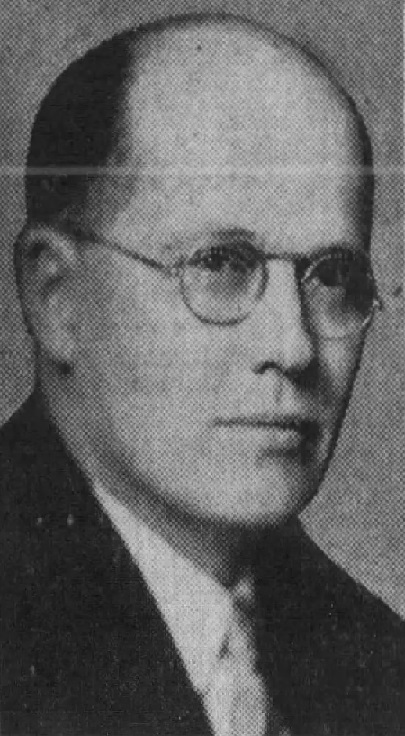
- Dayton Daily News, June 9, 1934

Member of the U.S. House of Representatives from Ohio's 3rd district
- In office March 4, 1931 – January 3, 1939
- Preceded by: Roy G. Fitzgerald
- Succeeded by: Harry N. Routzohn

Personal details
- Born: October 22, 1886 Greenville, Ohio
- Died: November 11, 1949 (aged 63) Cogan House, Pennsylvania
- Resting place: Woodland Cemetery, Dayton, Ohio
- Party: Democratic
- Spouse: Sada B. Shaw
- Children: three
- Education: University of Michigan; University of Michigan Law School

Byron Berry Harlan (October 22, 1886 – November 11, 1949) was an American attorney, prosecutor, jurist and member of the United States House of Representatives from Ohio. He served four terms in Congress from 1931 to 1939.

== Early life and education ==
Byron B. Harlan was born in Greenville, Ohio, and moved with his parents, Benjamin Berry and Margaret (Bond) Harlan, to Dayton, Ohio, when he was eight. His father was a high school teacher. Byron attended the Dayton public schools. He then attended the University of Michigan where he was a member of Theta Chi fraternity and was graduated with a Bachelor of Arts from its College of Arts and Sciences in 1909 and LL. B. from its Law College in 1911. He was admitted to the Ohio bar and commenced practice in Dayton in 1911.

== Family life and career ==
About 1914, Byron Berry Harlan married Sada B. Shaw (1887–1952) who was born in Canada and came to the United States when she was three years old. They had three children.

Byron Harlan was assistant prosecuting attorney of Montgomery County, Ohio, from 1912 to 1916. He served on the governing board of the Humane Society of Dayton with Harry N. Routzohn and other prominent citizens. In 1928, he became president of the Ohio Federated Humane Societies, serving in that capacity for fifteen years. In 1938, he was honorary vice president of the American Humane Association.

== Tenure in Congress ==
In 1930, Byron B. Harlan was elected as a Democrat from Ohio's Third District to the Seventy-second Congress and to the three succeeding Congresses. He served as chairman of the Committee on Revision of the Laws in the Seventy-second and Seventy-third Congresses.

In 1931, he indicated his intent to support repeal of Prohibition saying repeal would "preserve a government of law and particularly local government as much as possible. The money now going to corrupt government and finance crime would be diverted into legal channels."

In June 1933, a disgruntled Spanish–American War veteran, who was cut off the pension and disability rolls of the Veterans Bureau, murdered the chief of the medical staff of the National Military Home in Dayton when his plans to kill Representative Harlan were frustrated. He had gone to the Gem City Democratic Club in Dayton several times, carrying bombs intended for Harlan. Each time, however, Harlan had been away. Harlan had voted for the Economy Act in Congress which severely cut veterans benefits.

Byron B. Harlan, a strong New Deal activist, strongly supported education through funding of the New Deal National Youth Administration (NYA) that provided student aid to higher education. The college student-aid program proved to be politically successful in Ohio, drawing broad support from college students and administrators alike. College student-aid programs instituted under the Federal Emergency Relief Administration and the NYA convinced college administrations that the federal government could be an ally. New Deal student aid programs led to the expanded role government would play in American higher education after World War II.

Representative Byron B. Harlan was an outspoken supporter of Roosevelt's plan to pack the Supreme Court in 1937. Taking issue with suggestions for a constitutional amendment to address the intransigence of the existing court, Mr. Harlan said such a course might delay essential legislation fifteen years. He took to the floor of the House to speak:

"Packing the courts is a convenient phrase to crystallize prejudice and escape the necessity of thought," Mr. Harlan said. "No one is attempting to pack courts; the real effort being made is to unpack them."

"The check which the courts have on Congress is not provided for in the Constitution. The check which Congress has on the courts is provided for, and those who are fearful of creating an unbalance of power by the exercise of this legislative prerogative which we have frequently exercised in the past are speaking, I submit, out of a fear of the dark rather than their own substantial danger."

"What chance is there against this opposition of all the organized selfishness in this country to pass through an amendment to protect the hours and working conditions of adult laborers? None at all and the people who are proposing this method know it full well."

"When these property rights come into conflict with the rights of human beings to a living wage or with the rights of a democracy to plan its own economy, decisions are almost a foregone conclusion, not from any corrupt motives, quite the contrary, from the very highest motives, but their emotions just like yours and mine are the outgrowth of their training and experience."

"Yet if our courts prevent Congress from scientific, economic planning, and if we reject the President's proposal, there is no plan open to us other than to continue our efforts to spend ourselves into prosperity. Nobody likes that, but without it, nine million workers face starvation, and where is there a political party that will ever have the temerity to meet that situation? Governor Landon attempted it in the beginning of his campaign, but before he was through, he was outbidding President Roosevelt."

Harlan went to the airwaves to talk about the judiciary program, appearing frequently on the national radio networks of the time. However, he was defeated as a candidate for reelection to a fifth term in 1938.

== Judge ==
Byron B. Harlan returned to Dayton where he resumed the practice of law. He remained active in Democratic politics and was a delegate to the Democratic National Convention in 1940. He was appointed United States attorney for the southern district of Ohio from May 1944 until March 1946 when he was appointed by President Truman to fill a vacancy on the United States Tax Court. He was reappointed to a full twelve-year term in 1948 but died November 11, 1949.

== Death ==
Byron Berry Harlan died of a heart attack in 1949 while on a visit to his two sons in Cogan House, Pennsylvania. He is interred with his wife and parents in Woodland Cemetery, Dayton, Ohio.

U.S. House of Representatives
Preceded by Roy G. Fitzgerald	U.S. Representative from Ohio's District 3; 1931–1939	Succeeded by Harry N. Routzohn
