= Excello, Ohio =

Unincorporated community in Ohio, U.S.

- Unincorporated Community
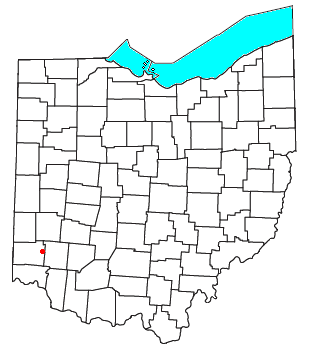
- Location of Excello, Ohio
- Coordinates: 39°28′51″N 84°25′08″W

Excello is an unincorporated community in central Lemon Township, Butler County, Ohio, United States, on the south side of Middletown. It comprises roughly the area south of Oxford State Road and State Route 73, west of State Route 4, and east of the Great Miami River. The Excello Lock was a canal lock on the Miami and Erie Canal. Remnants of the lock remain as public property owned by the MCD (Miami Conservancy District). Also in Excello was former Harding-Jones Paper Company plant, which is now closed but is on the National Register of Historic Places.

Excello sprang up when the Excello Paper Company opened at the site in the 1860s. A post office was opened in Excello on November 10, 1870, but no longer exists.

== Notable person ==
- J. Eugene Harding, United States Representative
- Howard Jones, Football Player and Head Coach of, most notably, USC
- John Quirk Sherman, Inventor and Dayton businessman of the Standard Register Co. (now Taylor Communications)
