= Paul J. Sorg =

American politician (1820–1902)

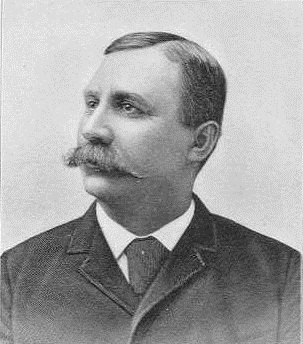
- 1896 photograph

Member of the U.S. House of Representatives from Ohio's 3rd district
- In office May 21, 1894 – March 3, 1897
- Preceded by: George W. Houk
- Succeeded by: John Lewis Brenner

Personal details
- Born: Paul John Sorg; September 23, 1840 Wheeling, Virginia, US
- Died: May 28, 1902 (aged 61) Middletown, Ohio, US
- Resting place: Woodside Cemetery
- Party: Democratic
- Spouse: Susan Jennie Gruver
- Children: Paul Arthur Sorg, Ada Gruver Sorg
- Profession: Tobacco merchant
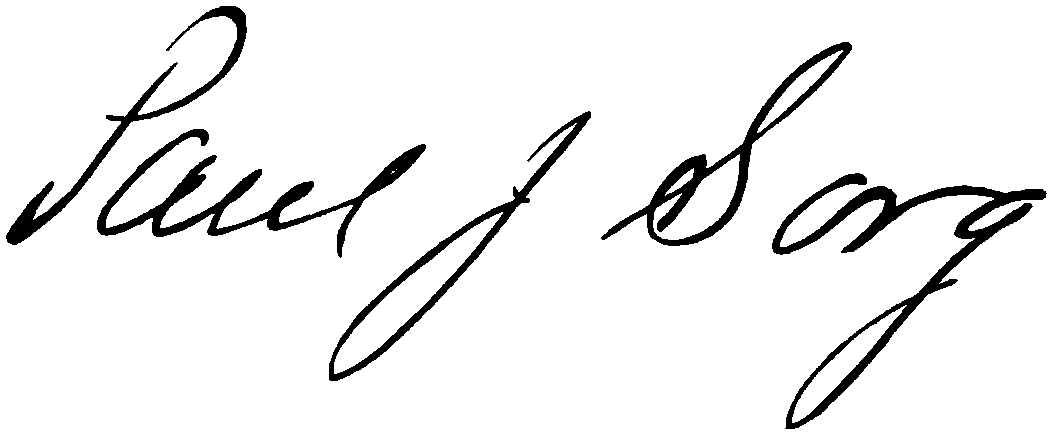
- Signature

Paul John Sorg (September 23, 1840 – May 28, 1902) was an American businessman, Civil War veteran, and member of the United States House of Representatives from Ohio from 1894 to 1897.

== Biography ==
He was born in Wheeling, Virginia (now West Virginia) on September 23, 1840. He attended public school. He was the youngest son of Henry and Elizabeth Sorg, immigrants from Hesse-Darmstadt (or Hesse-Kassel or Hesse-Cassel), Germany. Paul Sorg moved with his parents and siblings to Cincinnati, Ohio in 1852 where he was apprenticed as an iron molder. He attended night school in Cincinnati. He served in the Union Army during the Civil War.

=== Business career ===
In 1864, Paul J. Sorg met John Auer, a German-born tobacco roller in Cincinnati. Auer could make tobacco, but he couldn't keep books; for his part, Sorg knew nothing about tobacco, but he was a good bookkeeper. These two men organized a firm for the manufacture of tobaccos, starting a plant in Cincinnati. In 1869, they partnered with another tobacco firm in Cincinnati. One of the new partners lived in Middletown, Ohio and urged the newly formed company, Wilson, Sorg and Company, to relocate there and a new plant was constructed.

Sorg and Auer soon sold their share of the business and immediately formed another company, P. J. Sorg Tobacco Co., to manufacture cut filler and plug tobacco. One of their brand names was "Biggest and Best". This new firm they built up to become one of the largest of its type in the world and Sorg became Middletown's first multi-millionaire.

=== Personal life ===
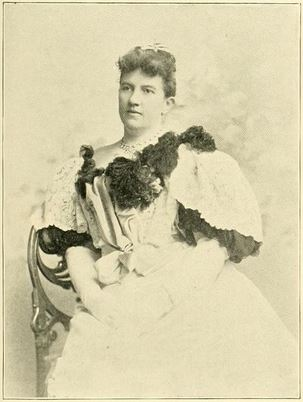
Susan Jennie Gruver

On July 20, 1876, he married Susan Jennie Gruver (1854–1930) in Middletown. They had two children, Paul Arthur Sorg (1878–1913) and Ada Gruver Sorg (1882–1956). In 1888, he completed a $1 million, 35-room stone Romanesque mansion that still stands in Middletown. Converted into apartments at one time, the mansion is currently under restoration by Mark and Traci Barnett and being converted back to a single family residence. Being a public-spirited man, he made many civic and charitable contributions to build up the city of his adoption, including the 1891 Sorg Opera House (designed by Samuel Hannaford) that is the performance center of Middletown's Sorg Opera.

=== Congress ===
At a special election held in May 1894 to fill the vacancy caused by the death of George W. Houk, Paul Sorg was elected as a Democrat to the Fifty-third congress from Ohio's Third district. He declined at first to accept renomination in 1894, in pique that a friend had not been appointed Consul to Berlin by President Grover Cleveland, to whose campaign Sorg had contributed generously. However, he relented and was narrowly re-elected to the Fifty-fourth in 1894 when the Republicans swept all but two seats of the Ohio delegation and two-thirds of Congress partly as a result of the Panic of 1893.

He was the ranking member on the Committee on Labor. He declined a third election in 1896.

James M. Cox, a Butler county native working as assistant telegraph and railroad editor of the Cincinnati Enquirer, went with Sorg to Washington as his executive secretary. A few years later, Cox held the same seat in Congress.

=== Later life ===
After leaving Congress, he allowed his name to be put in nomination for Governor of Ohio at the July 1897 Democratic convention, but withdrew his name during the second ballot. He allowed efforts toward nomination again for the 1899 election, but these came to nothing when he became ill.

Sorg resumed his former tobacco business activities in Middletown, forming a Tobacco Trust with Lorillard and Liggett until he sold the business to Continental Tobacco Company for $4.5 million in 1898. With the proceeds, he purchased in 1899 a paper company that had been the first paper mill in Middletown but had subsequently gone through several hands. He renamed the company, the Paul A. Sorg Paper Co., for his son who became president of the firm. Paul J. Sorg continued his business career as president of a bank in which he had invested in 1891. He also had real estate and railroad interests.

He was appointed by Governor Asa S. Bushnell, a leader in trust-busting, to be a delegate to a national Conference on Trusts in 1899. The topic of discussion was to be "Trusts and Combinations, their uses and abuses—Railway, labor, industrial and commercial", a subject on which Sorg could be said to be an expert.

== Death and burial ==
Sorg died in Middletown, Ohio, where he was interred in Woodside Cemetery.

U.S. House of Representatives
Preceded by George W. Houk	U.S. Representative from Ohio's 3rd district 1894 - 1897	Succeeded by John Lewis Brenner
