= Paul Arthur Sorg =

American horseman (1878–1913)

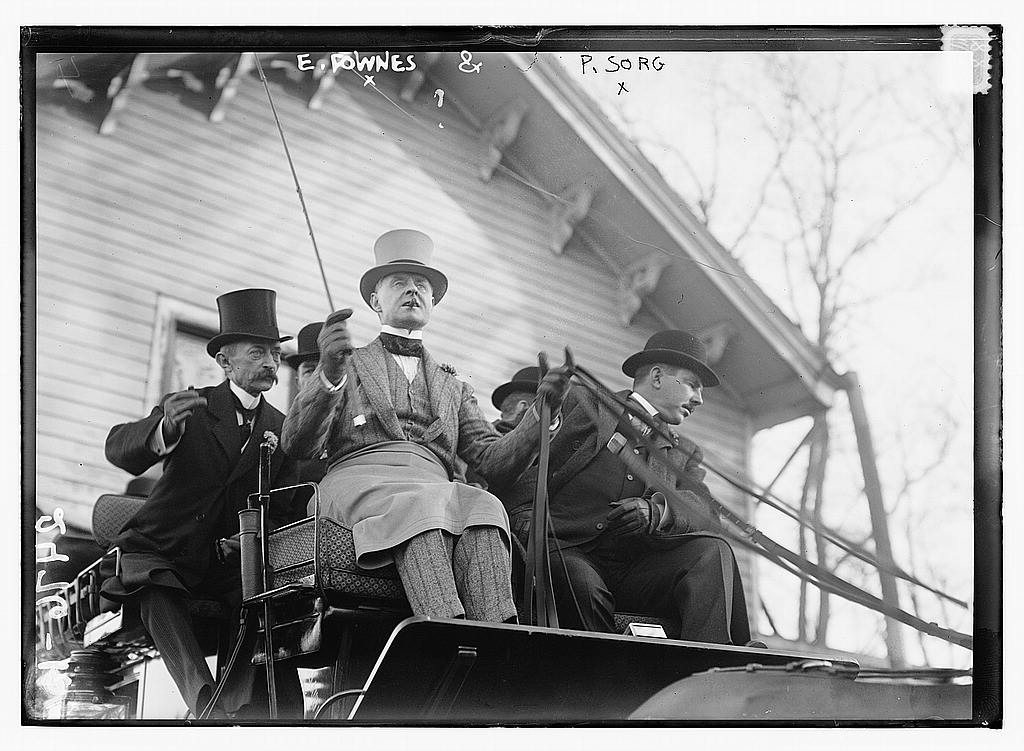
- Born: July 22, 1878; Middletown, Ohio, US
- Died: May 4, 1913 (aged 34); New York City, US
- Burial place: Middletown, Ohio
- Known for: Owner and exhibitor of show horses
- Spouse: Grayce Aull (m. 1904)
- Parent: Paul John Sorg; Susan Jennie Gruver

Paul Arthur Sorg (July 22, 1878 – May 4, 1913) was an heir and an owner and exhibitor of show horses.

== Biography ==
Sorg was born on July 22, 1878, in Middletown, Ohio to Paul John Sorg and Susan Jennie Gruver (1854–1930). He went to Yale University, but left after his freshman year. In 1900, Sorg inherited $10,000,000 from his father, who died in 1902. He inherited a majority interest in, and was elected president of, the Merchants' National Bank. At that time, he was the youngest national bank president in the United States.

Sorg lived at 12 E. 87th Street New York City, where his living quarters included the entire top floor, 22 rooms in total with 8 servants on staff. He also built a house at 3 W. Terrace Ave. in Lakewood, New York with 180 degree views of Lake Chautauqua.

On June 22, 1904, he married Grayce Aull of Pittsburgh, Pennsylvania. They had a son, Paul Arthur Sorg Jr. who died at 3 months old in 1911. Sorg frequently competed with, and beat, Alfred Gwynne Vanderbilt and the Vanderbilt family in horse racing and horse shows. He set world records in many multi-day racing events. In 1910, Paul set a record previously held by Alfred G. Vanderbilt racing from New York City to Atlantic city in record time using over 40 men and 75 horses. Vanderbilt used over 12 drivers to complete the race, whilst Sorg drove most of the distance himself. He died of heart disease in New York City on May 4, 1913.
