= Springfield pet-eating hoax =

2024 American anti-immigration allegations

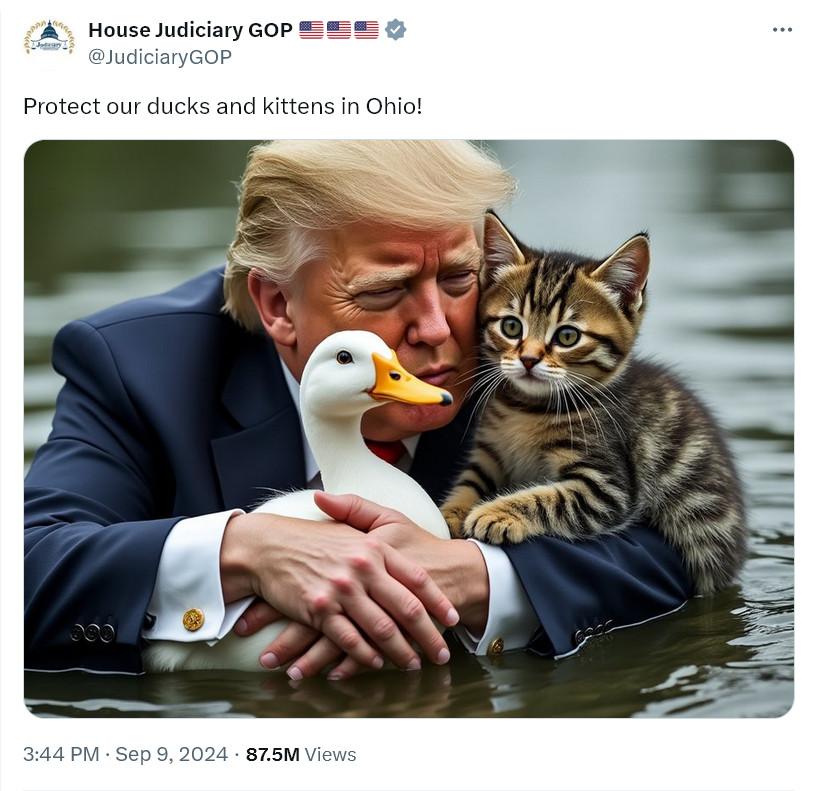
X post by the Republican Party's account for the United States House Committee on the Judiciary on September 9, 2024, referencing the hoax with an AI-generated picture of Donald Trump hugging a cat and a duck and the caption "Protect our ducks and kittens in Ohio!"

Starting in September 2024, false claims spread online saying Haitian immigrants were stealing and eating pets in Springfield, Ohio, United States. The claims began with a local Facebook group post claiming a neighbor's daughter's cat had been butchered, and spread quickly among far-right and neo-Nazi groups. The claims were then amplified by prominent figures in the American right, most notably Republican Ohio senator and vice-presidential nominee JD Vance, followed by his running mate Donald Trump and allies such as Laura Loomer and Elon Musk. Subsequently, the person who posted to Facebook and her neighbor admitted the daughter's involvement was false and it was just a rumor from a friend's acquaintance, with whom they had not spoken.

Springfield and county law enforcement said that no credible reports or evidence support the claims, and the city's mayor Rob Rue and Ohio governor Mike DeWine, who are both Republicans, denounced them. Fact-checking website Snopes called the claims unfounded, while others characterized them as a hoax or a lie. When challenged on the factual basis of the claims, Vance told interviewer Dana Bash, "If I have to create stories so that the American media actually pays attention to the suffering of the American people, then that's what I'm going to do."

The claims were widely described as racist, and they spread amid existing racial tensions in Springfield, where recent legal Haitian immigration strained some public resources. There had been previous incidents of hostility towards the local Haitian community and unfounded local rumors of Haitians stealing waterfowl for food. After the claims spread, dozens of bomb threats targeted Springfield schools, hospitals, public buildings, and businesses, often accompanied by anti-Haitian messages. Fact-checking website PolitiFact named the hoax its annual "Lie of the Year".

== Background ==
In 1983, Newsweek called Springfield one of America's "dream cities," but in 2011 Gallup referred to it as the "unhappiest city" in the country primarily due to deindustrialization, which caused substantial job losses and an exodus of residents. By 2015, its population had dwindled from about 80,000 in 1970 to under 60,000. In 2014, the city launched a "Welcome Springfield" initiative to attract immigrants to improve the local economy. The city's leadership and its Chamber of Commerce then led a drive to attract businesses and investment to spur an economic revival in Springfield.

As new businesses opened and a labor shortage emerged, Haitian immigrants began arriving in Springfield around 2017 to work in local produce-packaging and machining factories. By 2020, Springfield's economy had somewhat rebounded; new employers had added some 8,000 jobs, adding to the labor shortage. Employers encouraged Haitians to continue coming to the city to fill jobs in warehouses, manufacturing, and the service sector. Haitians in the United States, Haiti, and South America heard from family and friends about Springfield, its low cost of living, and its need for workers. Immigration increased substantially after the start of the COVID-19 pandemic, coinciding with deepening political and economic instability in Haiti after the assassination of the president in 2021. By 2024, some 12,000 to 15,000 immigrants, many Haitian, had legally moved to the Springfield area. In June 2024, ongoing crises and severe violence in the Caribbean nation of Haiti led the U.S. Department of Homeland Security to grant temporary protected status to Haitian immigrants, allowing the existing migrant population in the U.S. to live and work without the risk of deportation.

While the migrants have had a positive economic impact on the city, the rapid growth of its immigrant population has strained public resources. In July 2024, Springfield city manager Bryan Heck sent a letter to the Senate Banking and Housing Committee asking for federal assistance to address the housing crisis caused by a swift expansion of population. The next day, Ohio senator JD Vance excerpted part of the letter to support an anti-immigration argument, framing it as a "migrant crisis" instead of a housing crisis, and ignoring the request for help.

The increased Haitian population and resource strain fueled racial tensions in Springfield, leading to a series of attacks on the Haitian community. In early 2023, a Springfield man committed several assaults and robberies on Haitian residents and was later sentenced to 20 years in federal prison. The local Haitian church was vandalized and broken into twice. U.S.-born Black people of Springfield were verbally abused when mistakenly identified by strangers as Haitian immigrants. In August 2023, a Haitian immigrant crashed into a school bus on State Route 41 northwest of Springfield, killing an 11-year-old boy. The driver was later sentenced to nine to 13 1/2 years in prison. The incident further inflamed racial tensions in the area and increased hostility towards the Haitian community. Later that month, the Springfield Jazz & Blues Fest was interrupted by neo-Nazis with rifles who performed Nazi salutes and held swastika flags. Local police called it "a little peaceful protest". Afterwards, a member of the neo-Nazi group Blood Tribe disrupted a Springfield city meeting, introducing himself with an allusion to an anti-black slur and saying that "crime and savagery will only increase with every Haitian you bring in". The Counter Extremism Project reported that on September 1, the white nationalist Patriot Front protested against the Haitian immigrants in Springfield.

== Origin and spread ==
=== Facebook post ===
The rumor that Haitian immigrants ate a pet cat in Springfield began in early September 2024 with a Facebook post to a private group called "Springfield Ohio Crime and Information", and that post was later re-posted elsewhere. The post said:

Warning to all about our beloved pets & those around us!! My neighbor informed me that her daughter’s friend had lost her cat. She checked pages, kennels, asked around, etc. One day she came home from work, as soon as she stepped out of her car, looked towards a neighbors house, where Haitians live, & saw her cat hanging from a branch, like you'd do a deer for butchering, & they were carving it up to eat. I've been told they are doing this to dogs, they have been doing it at snyder park with the ducks & geese, as I was told that last bit by Rangers & police. Please keep a close eye.

The author of the Facebook post later deleted it and expressed regret that the story fueled conspiracy theories. The neighbor who initially relayed the story to the poster said that she was not "the most credible source", and clarified that it was not her daughter's friend but just a rumor she heard from a friend's acquaintance.

=== Other events ===
Misinformation about several unrelated stories led to their being linked to the pet-eating hoax. Before the pet-eating claims gained virality, there were rumors in Springfield of Haitians eating waterfowl from city parks, which the city's deputy director of public safety and operations denied. In July, a user posted a photo to Reddit of a man carrying a dead Canada goose on the street in Columbus, Ohio. The goose was roadkill, there was no evidence that the man intended to eat it, and there was never any evidence the man was Haitian or an immigrant. More than a month after the Reddit post, right-wing sites and influencers publicized the photo, claiming it shows a Haitian immigrant stealing geese in Springfield. The Ohio Department of Natural Resources was inundated with phone calls from people who believed the misinformation, and it became associated with the larger pet-eating hoax.

In August, a 27-year-old U.S.-born woman was arrested in Canton, Ohio, on charges that she killed and ate a cat. Police body camera footage of the arrest was posted to social media and falsely labeled as an arrest in Springfield. Like the Columbus man, the Canton woman had no connection to Haiti or Springfield. The woman was later sentenced to twelve months in prison in relation to the case.

On August 26, Clark County law enforcement dispatchers received a call from someone who said they saw Haitians carrying geese near a Springfield bike trail, but police found no evidence. Clark County Commission president Melanie Flax Wilt characterized the episode as a "literal wild goose chase", and Clark County officials said no other calls regarding stolen animals had been received in the last 11 months. The following day, a Springfield resident commented at a city commission meeting, without evidence, that immigrants were "in the park grabbing up ducks by their neck and cutting their head off ... and eating them". The only confirmed report of someone illegally hunting geese in Springfield was a 64-year-old white man, who was arrested on September 10 and charged with illegally hunting Canada geese at a golf course with a shotgun; he later pled guilty to hunting without a permit.

=== Official response ===
Springfield's police department issued a statement that said "there have been no credible reports or specific claims of pets being harmed, injured or abused by individuals within the immigrant community". Springfield mayor Rob Rue said that there was no evidence to support claims that geese or ducks from parks were being killed and eaten. He told an interviewer, "All these federal politicians that have negatively spun our city, they need to know they're hurting our city, and it was their words that did it." City manager Bryan Heck called the rumors "disinformation". Ohio governor Mike DeWine, a Republican, rebuked the rumors, saying, "This is a piece of garbage that is simply not true. There's no evidence of this at all." He also emphasized that these "people are here legally."

=== Amplification by Republican politicians and right-wing influencers ===
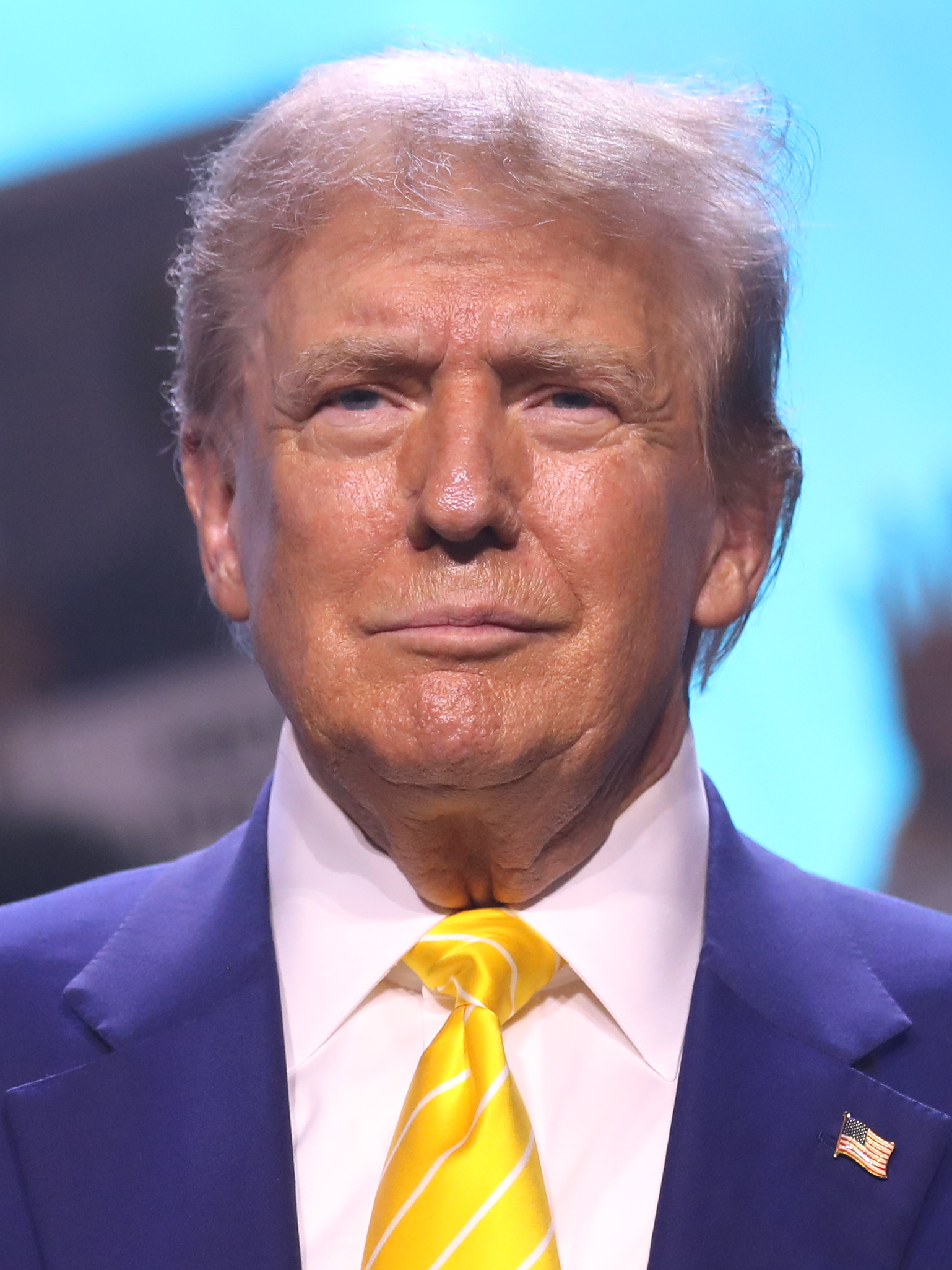
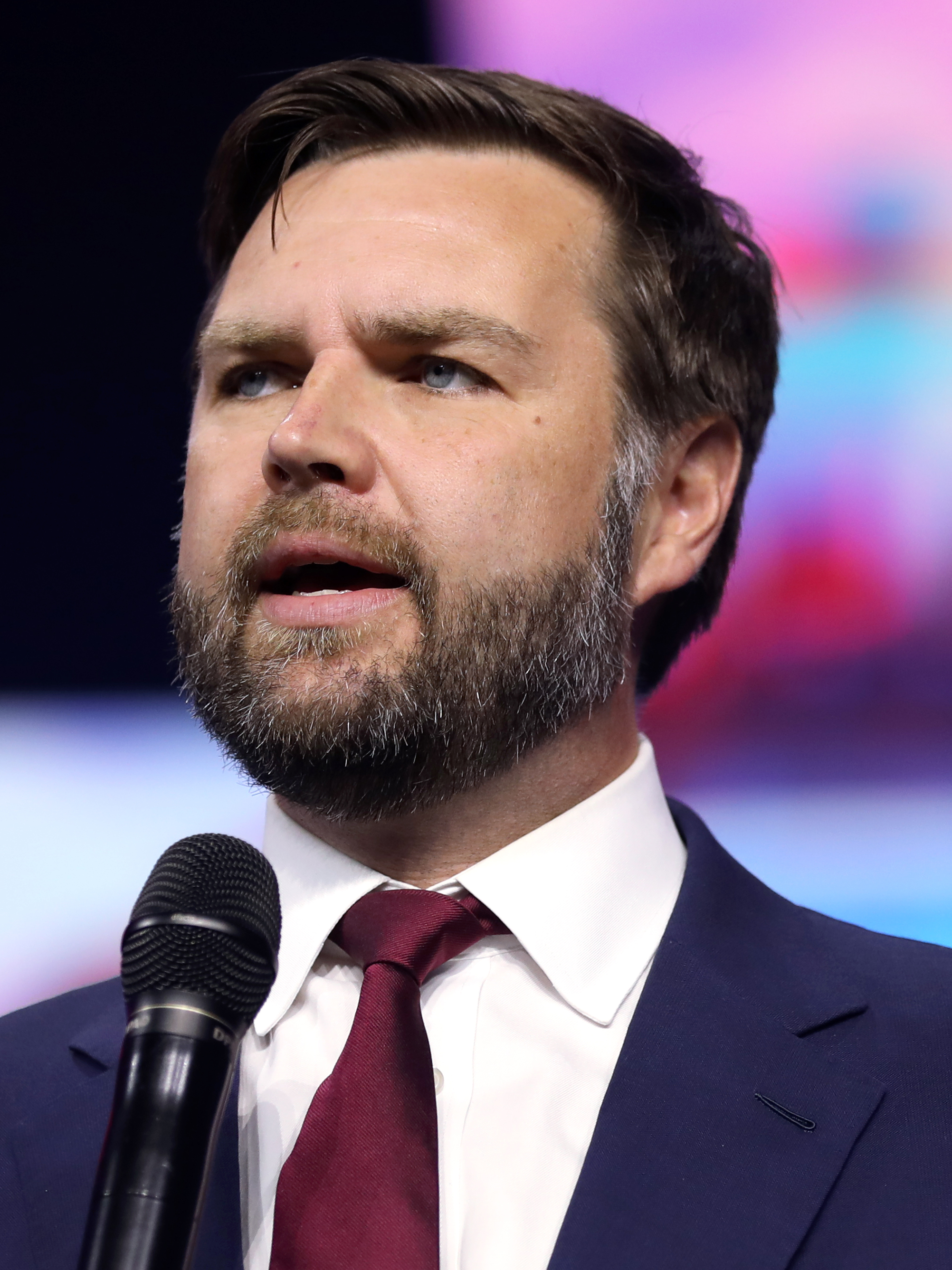
Donald Trump (left) and JD Vance (right) are prominent proponents of the hoax.

The initial claims based on the Facebook post went viral among American far-right, neo-Nazi groups, and popular right-wing X accounts which presented the claims as fact. Captive Dreamer, an account followed by Vance and Musk and described by The Daily Dot as "one of the most popular accounts posting white nationalist content on X", took credit for its spread. According to the Media Forensics Hub at Clemson University, the first viral content was a tweet posted on September 6 by the account End Wokeness (linked to alt-right commentator and conspiracy theorist Jack Posobiec), which was viewed millions of times and included a screenshot of the Facebook post, a screenshot of the Reddit photo of the man with the goose, and text linking disappearing "ducks and pets" to 20,000 Haitians "shipped to" Springfield.

On September 9, JD Vance, a U.S. senator from Ohio and the 2024 Republican nominee for vice president, spread the false claim in a tweet while referencing his July 2024 press release, writing: "Months ago, I raised the issue of Haitian illegal immigrants draining social services and generally causing chaos all over Springfield, Ohio. Reports now show that people have had their pets abducted and eaten by people who shouldn't be in this country." A magazine profile on the Trump campaign later stated that Trump campaign staff member Alex Bruesewitz encouraged Vance to amplify the claim. One of Vance's staffers had asked Springfield's city manager Brian Heck about the claim; Heck recalled, "I told him no. There was no verifiable evidence or reports to show this was true. I told them these claims were baseless." Vance responded to criticism of his post on September 10, writing: "In the last several weeks, my office has received many inquiries from actual residents of Springfield who've said their neighbors' pets or local wildlife were abducted by Haitian migrants. It's possible, of course, that all of these rumors will turn out to be false." He also encouraged supporters to continue posting and "keep the cat memes flowing".

Right-wing influencers used X to spread the claims and related memes, with Laura Loomer posting about "20,000 cannibalistic Haitians" eating cats and dogs in Springfield and Texas senator Ted Cruz sharing a widely criticized meme showing two cats with the caption "Please vote for Trump, so Haitian immigrants don't eat us". The Arizona Republican Party purchased twelve roadside billboards in the Phoenix metro area stating "Eat less kittens, Vote Republican!", spoofing Chick-Fil-A's "Eat Mor Chikin" advertising campaign. Elon Musk shared a variety of memes and videos including misinformation about eating pets and Haitian Vodou. Caribbean and Latin American ethnologists interviewed by Deutsche Welle clarified the myth, explaining that Vodou had long been stigmatized in the U.S. since the 1915–1934 U.S. occupation of Haiti when American soldiers often interpreted Vodou rituals they observed as Satanism.

External videos
- Pet-eating remarks during the Trump-Harris debate on September 10, 2024

Following his running mate's promotion of this false rumor, it was elevated further by Republican presidential nominee Donald Trump. During the Harris–Trump presidential debate on September 10, Trump falsely claimed that: "In Springfield, they're eating the dogs, the people that came in, they're eating the cats. They're eating, they're eating the pets of the people that live there. And this is what's happening in our country, and it's a shame." Harris started laughing as Trump was making those statements. After Trump concluded his statements, the moderator of the debate, David Muir, stated that ABC News reached out to the city manager, whose spokesperson said: "There have been no credible reports of specific claims of pets being harmed, injured or abused by individuals within the immigrant community".

Despite many news outlets debunking or criticizing the claims after the debate, they continued to spread and expand. Loomer falsely accused Haitian immigrants of eating humans, while sharing a video captioned "Cannibalism in Haiti". White House press secretary Karine Jean-Pierre, herself the daughter of Haitian immigrants, responded to the comments, stating that "no leader should ever associate with someone who spreads this kind of ugliness, this kind of racist poison." Trump began repeating the debunked claim that Haitians were walking off with pet geese from the parks and lakes in Springfield. According to a poll conducted by YouGov between 12 and September 13, 52% of Trump supporters said that the claim is "definitely" or "probably" true, 24% said they're "not sure" if it's true, and 25% said it's "probably" or "definitely" false.

=== Continued spread ===
The Republican Party of Arizona commissioned propaganda billboards, in the style of Chick-Fil-A advertising, promoting the pet-eating hoax.

Trump continued to include the claims as part of his campaign messaging, pledging to conduct mass deportations of Haitian immigrants from the city of Springfield, even though the majority of them are in the United States legally. He vowed to end their temporary protected status, and when questioned about the false claims, he refused to correct them. Bernie Moreno, the Republican candidate for senate in Ohio, likewise called for deportation and for their temporary protected status to be terminated. Representative Clay Higgins repeated the hoax, calling Haitian immigrants "thugs", "slapstick gangsters" and insisting that they leave the U.S. He further called Haiti "the nastiest country in the western hemisphere". Despite Haitians being in the country legally, Vance said that he was "still going to call them an illegal alien" because he objected to the law that gave them legal status, incorrectly claiming that their legal status came from an illegal act by presidential candidate Kamala Harris. Trump has likewise called them "illegal immigrants," claiming that 30,000 were "dropped" into Springfield, and that Haitian migrants in Springfield have weapons "beyond even military scope". When the former president announced he would visit Springfield and Aurora in late September, both Governor DeWine and Mayor Rue advised against the visit, citing strained resources.

Vance continued to amplify and expand the claims, posting multiple pieces of misleading evidence in support. He shared a dated video of cats roaming where skinned animals were being grilled in Dayton, Ohio, which was refuted by both the Dayton police and its mayor, while social media users responded that it appeared to just be chicken. A Vance aide gave The Wall Street Journal a police report from a Springfield resident who said that her pet cat was missing, casting suspicion on her Haitian neighbors. But when reporters checked with the woman, she said that the missing cat, Sassy, was hiding in her basement and she had apologized to her neighbors.

In a September 15 interview, Vance again defended the claims, saying they were "the first-hand accounts of my constituents", while also acknowledging that they were false, calling them a meme: "The American media totally ignored this stuff until Donald Trump and I started talking about cat memes. If I have to create stories so that the American media actually pays attention to the suffering of the American people, then that's what I'm going to do." In the same interview, Vance stated that murders in Springfield were up 81% and blamed immigrants despite no Haitians being involved in any Springfield murder. Elsewhere, Vance falsely suggested that Springfield's immigrants had caused "a massive rise in communicable diseases". During the 2024 vice presidential debate, Tim Walz accused Vance of vilifying legal Haitian migrants, while Vance blamed the town's situation on "Kamala Harris's open border". When the moderators ended the section by clarifying the Haitian population of Springfield were legal immigrants, Vance objected, saying that fact-checking was against the agreed upon rules.

== Subsequent violence and threats ==
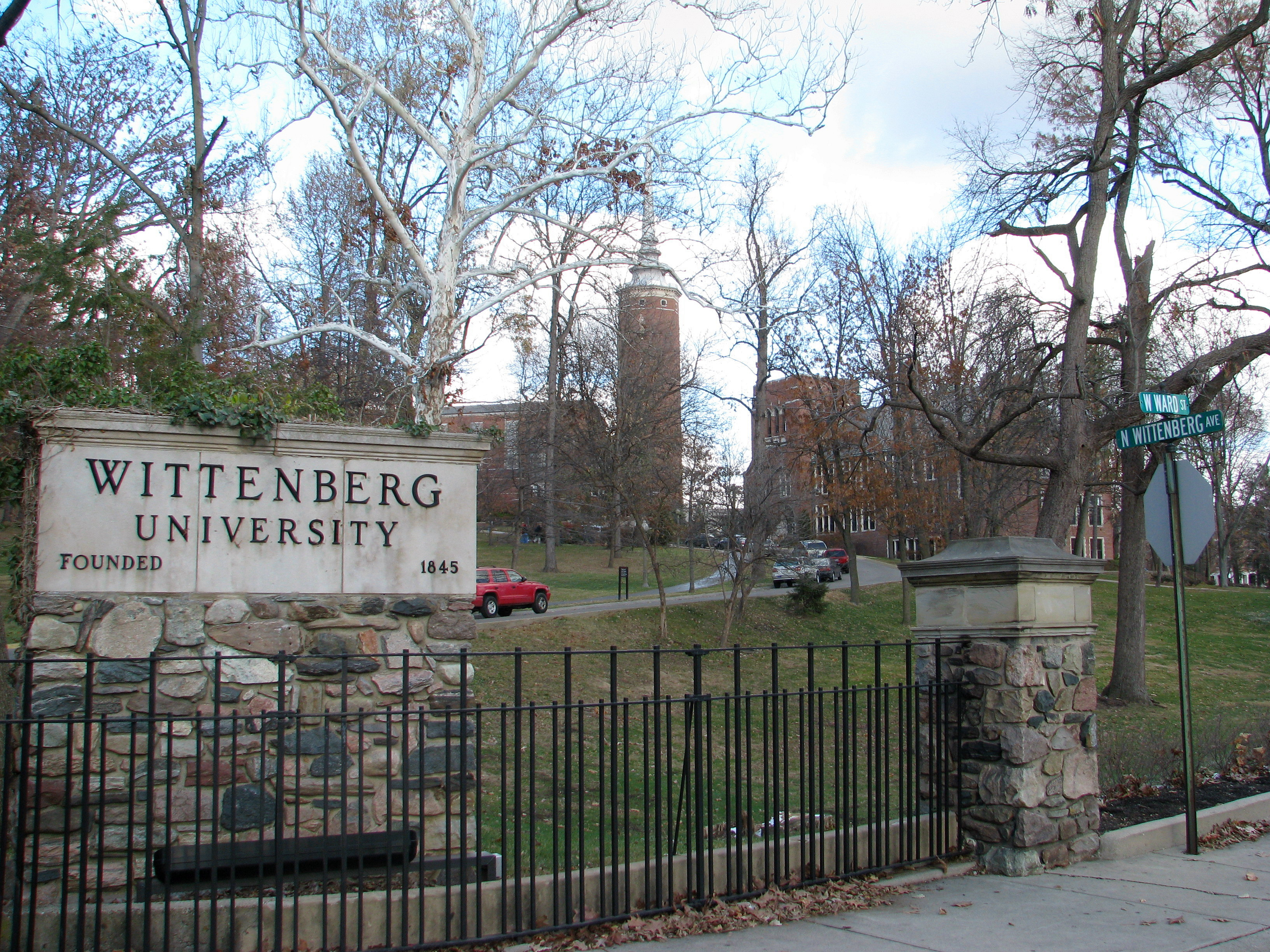
Wittenberg University, in Springfield, was forced to cancel events after threats of violence related to the hoax.

Following amplification and national news, Springfield received dozens of bomb threats accompanied by anti-Haitian messages, targeting schools, hospitals, government buildings, and businesses.

On September 12, several public institutions in Springfield received bomb threats, evacuating and closing City Hall, several city and county government buildings, and two schools, Fulton Elementary and Springfield Academy of Excellence. The mayor said that the person making the threat "used hateful language towards immigrants and Haitians in our community". More bomb threats followed the next day, targeting municipal buildings as well as Perrin Woods and Snowhill elementary schools, the Cliff Park High School, and Roosevelt Middle School. On September 14, more bomb threats closed or locked down Springfield Regional Medical Center and Kettering Health Springfield. The bomb threats were sent via email "to multiple agencies and media outlets" according to the city commission office. Wittenberg University announced that all activities on campus were cancelled for the next day after receiving an emailed threat of a potential shooting targeting Haitians. Clark State College said that it received a bomb threat and a shooting threat the same weekend and would hold classes online the following week. More schools were targeted on September 16, Simon Kenton and Kenwood elementary schools, as well as the Tecumseh Local School District. The bomb threats continued on September 18 at two local Walmarts, a Kroger, a Planned Parenthood clinic, and the Pregnancy Resource Center of Clark County. City officials announced the cancellation of the annual CultureFest event as a precaution.

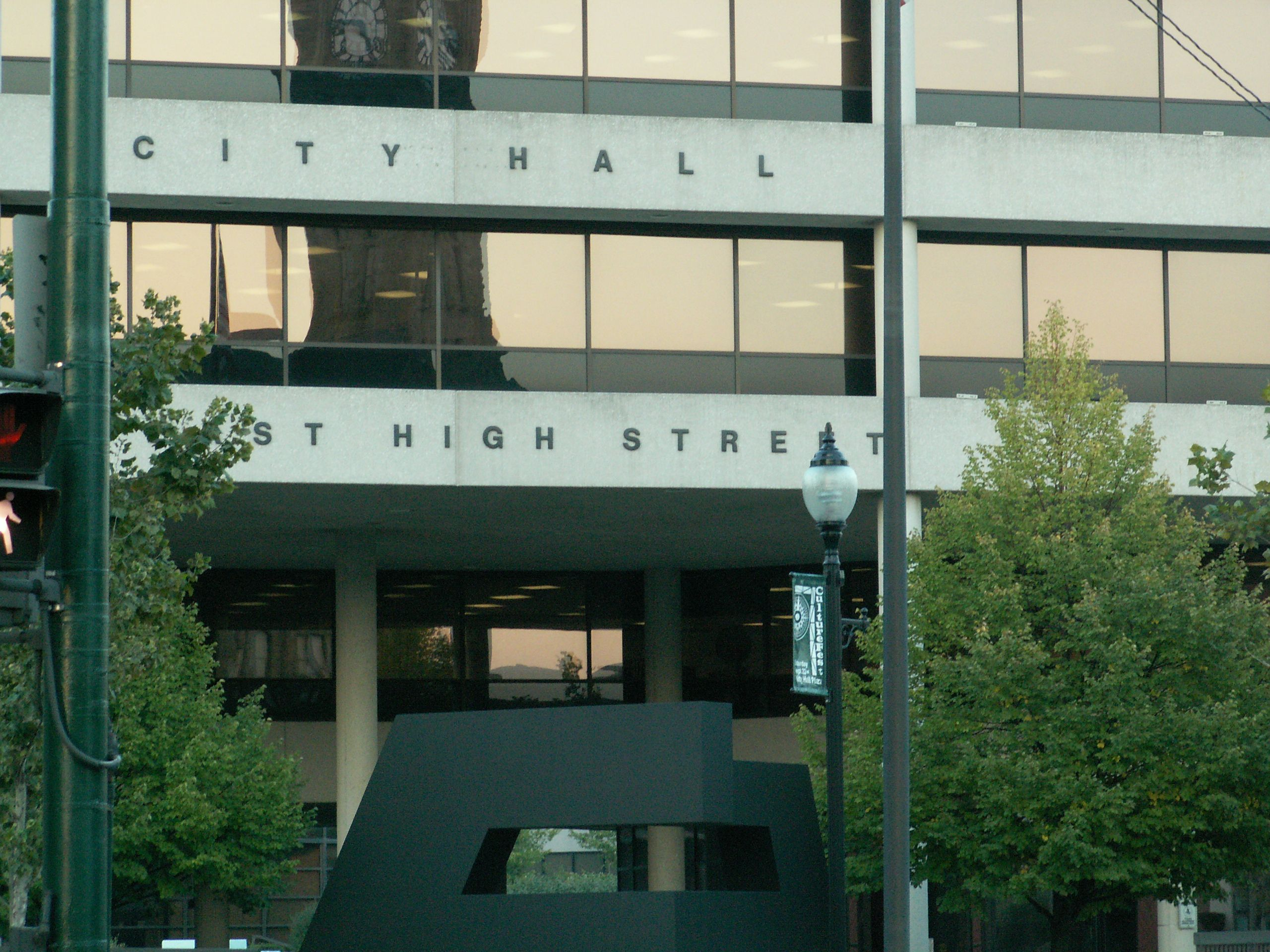
Springfield City Hall (pictured in 2007), one of several public buildings evacuated after bomb threats stemming from the hoax

Springfield law enforcement collaborated with the Federal Bureau of Investigation's Dayton office to investigate the threats. By September 16, Ohio governor Mike DeWine said the city had been hit by "at least 33" bomb threats, saying that many of them were coming from an unspecified country outside the US. He sent 36 Ohio State Highway Patrol troopers to patrol Springfield schools the next day to start daily sweeps as a precaution, and a number of police surveillance towers have been placed in the city. Mayor Rob Rue made an appeal to Americans that "We need help, not hate". Later, on September 19, he declared short-term emergency powers in order to "respond more efficiently to emerging risks, including civil unrest, cyber threats, and potential acts of violence." He noted that responding to the threats is "costing the city ... hundreds of thousands of dollars".

Far-right and hate groups have become more active in the area. The Blood Tribe neo-Nazi group claimed credit for spreading the hoax. The Proud Boys marched in Springfield. Flyers purporting to be from the Trinity White Knights of the Ku Klux Klan circulated, saying, "Foreigners & Haitians Out" and "Join us and stand against forced immigration."

Haitian Americans and Haitian immigrants in Springfield reported verbal harassment, bullying, and vandalism stemming from the controversy. The Haitian Times, a paper that covers Haiti and Haitian Americans, reported receiving hundreds of hateful messages, and one of its editors was swatted after running a story about the impact of the hoax on Haitians in Springfield. Springfield's Haitian Community Support and Help Center and The Haitian Times had planned an in-person forum at the Center for September 14, but changed it to an online forum due to safety concerns. Springfield's mayor said that he, his family, and other city officials have gotten death threats, and some have been swatted. After speaking well of his Haitian employees to news media, a Springfield businessman received death threats, and the FBI advised him to take security precautions for himself, his family, and his business. Other towns with Haitian immigrant communities, such as Charleroi, Pennsylvania, have been targeted by Trump and right-wing influencers. A local NAACP leader said she received a flurry of racist emails soon after JD Vance got involved. When interviewed in October, Haitian immigrants in Springfield said that they still felt fearful, and that the hate resulting from the hoax had already led some friends to move away.

Asked if he would denounce the bomb threats, Trump replied, "I don't know what happened with the bomb threats. I know that it's been taken over by illegal migrants and that's a terrible thing that happened."

== Reactions ==
The claims, variously described as debunked, false, or a conspiracy theory, have been widely characterized as a racist attempt to stoke fears or resentment of immigrants for political gain. Fact-checker Snopes rated the rumors as "unfounded". PolitiFact named the repeated claims by Trump and Vance about the hoax its "lie of the year" for 2024. A White House spokesperson said that Republicans were making false claims "based on an element of racism", and an editor from the nearby Columbus Dispatch said these were "undeniably racist rumors."

The Columbus photographer who posted the photo to Reddit of the man carrying the dead goose told The Columbus Dispatch he regretted taking the picture, saying: "I wish I never took it, for sure. And I hate that the picture that I took is being weaponized to use against immigrants, or really, any other group. They always have to have somebody to use as a weapon. Some group to be the bad guy." The father of the 11-year-old boy who was killed in the 2023 accident accused several politicians of exploiting his son's accidental death for political gain and demanded an apology from Trump and Vance for furthering a false narrative using the tragedy as a "political tool" to spur hatred towards Haitians. Vance had falsely claimed that the boy's death was a murder rather than an accident, while the Trump campaign had used images of the boy and the driver in their campaign materials.

The Arizona Republic described the remarks as the "most laughable line out of Tuesday's debate", and humorists mocked the claims, at times citing the 1986 NBC sitcom ALF about a space alien who attempts to eat cats while Sky News called it "fantasy world stuff with real world consequences". According to the Los Angeles Times, Trump has placed a target on the back of a small group of immigrants by repeating racist disinformation which is disgraceful and deserves ridicule.

The controversy also resulted in pop culture parodies. South African satirical music creator The Kiffness released a song parodying the hoax, titled "Eating the cats ft. Donald Trump (Debate Remix)", which quickly went viral. The song has been streamed and watched over 17 million times on YouTube and was viewed more than 1 million times on X within 24 hours of its posting. The Kiffness pledged to donate all proceeds to the Clark County SPCA in Springfield and raised over $20,000 for the organization. Another song remix by TikTok user CasaD sparked viral dance trends on the platform, which led right-wing personalities like Charlie Kirk to characterize the song as sincere support for Trump among members of Generation Z.

GermanForeignOffice
(@GermanyDiplo)
tweeted:

Like it or not: Germany's energy system is fully operational, with more than 50% renewables. And we are shutting down – not building – coal & nuclear plants. Coal will be off the grid by 2038 at the latest. PS: We also don’t eat cats and dogs. #Debate2024

September 11, 2024

On September 11, one day after the debate, Germany's Federal Foreign Office posted a tweet that corrected Trump's false statement about its energy transition and made fun of his "eating the cats/dogs" statements. While the reactions to the post were mostly positive – it was liked more than a hundred thousand times – Norbert Röttgen of the opposition Christian Democratic Union party said, "This is the official account of the Federal Foreign Office. This is very strange diplomacy", adding that "Trump could be the next president of the USA".

Mayor Rob Rue criticized Trump-Vance for spreading false rumors that unfairly targeted Haitian Americans. In response to Trump's calls for deportation, Governor DeWine said that that would be both an "economic mistake" and a "moral mistake". Local faith leaders reached out to the Haitian community, lending support. Springfield residents who supported the local Haitian population held rallies and organized support of local Haitian businesses in response to the controversy.

On September 13, during a "Celebration of Black Excellence" brunch event at the White House, President Joe Biden said that Haitian Americans were "under attack in our country right now", describing and denouncing the false rumors and how Trump was spreading them, although not addressing the presidential candidate by name. One of the prior speakers at the event was press secretary Karine Jean-Pierre, who has Haitian ancestry. Representative Sheila Cherfilus-McCormick, who is Haitian American, criticized Trump's comments, noting that Haitian immigrants contribute to the U.S. and are "committed to education, hard work, and building a better life, not just for themselves but for all of us". The National Haitian-American Elected Officials Network said that Trump's and Vance's "offensive statements" promoted "harmful stereotypes" and called on them to "engage in meaningful dialogue to address the harm caused". People in Haiti also condemned the baseless claims. Representative Alexandria Ocasio-Cortez condemned Trump and Vance, saying that when they "intentionally distribute incredibly malicious and disgusting claims like about eating pets, etc", they put people at risk of violence.

According to Secretary of Transportation Pete Buttigieg, Trump's amplification of the falsehood is a strategy to keep people talking about "the latest crazy thing that [Trump] did" because "he cannot afford for us to be talking about his record (...) or his agenda", or Vance's ideas; a distraction technique that is "not harmless". Buttigieg linked it to other recent actions by Trump, such as inviting Loomer to a memorial ceremony for the September 11 attacks when she had previously spread conspiracy theories about the attacks.

Ohio law makes it possible for private citizens to ask "a reviewing official" such as a judge to assess whether specific crimes have been committed. On September 24, the executive director of the Haitian Bridge Alliance filed a bench memorandum and affidavit at the Clark County Municipal Court, alleging that Trump and Vance had committed multiple crimes, including "disrupting public services, making false alarms, two counts of complicity, two counts of telecommunications harassment and aggravated menacing", and asking the court to issue arrest warrants. On October 4, the case was decided with an order for its matters to be "referred to the Clark County Prosecuting Attorney for further investigation and determination whether any prosecution is warranted."

After Donald Trump won the 2024 United States presidential election, some Haitians expressed an interest in moving out of Springfield.

== Legal aftermath ==
In February 2026, Ana C. Reyes, a judge of the United States District Court for the District of Columbia, stayed the termination of Haiti's temporary protected status and wrote that the record strongly suggested that Homeland Security Secretary Kristi Noem's decision to end it was motivated at least in part by racial animus. Among the evidence Reyes cited were Trump's false debate statements about Haitians eating pets in Springfield and his pledge to revoke the designation. On June 25, the Supreme Court ruled 6–3 in Mullin v. Doe that the termination was not subject to judicial review, and said the claim that it was motivated by race was unlikely to succeed. In July 2026, after the Supreme Court decision, a claim spread on social media that 80 percent of Springfield's Haitians had left the city or self-deported. Local advocates said the claim was false. The president of the Haitian Community Help and Support Center said some residents had left but not most, and that he believed the figure came from one business owner's remark in a news interview.

== Analysis ==
False claims about immigrants stealing and eating household pets date back more than a century in the United States. In the late 19th century, around the time of the Chinese Exclusion Act, it was among several racist stereotypes and slurs used to demonize immigrants from Asia. Professor of Sociology Anthony Ocampo told The Guardian that the trope is "low-hanging fruit to rally xenophobia in a very quick way", making it "easier to scapegoat or enact harmful laws against" a community characterized as "savage or uncivilized". According to The Washington Post, "the goal in spreading such stereotypes is to portray newcomers as unfit for American society or invoke disgust toward them".

According to MSNBC host Ana Cabrera, Trump deliberately amplified such stereotypes to strategically plant the seeds for a second-term immigration agenda, which would include the deportation of millions of immigrants. Cabrera also said Trump attempted to establish these American immigrants as the "other" – as people who are lesser than, despite the fact that Haitians, who are in Springfield legally, have played an important role in revitalizing Springfield's economy, reversing population decline and filling labor gaps there. According to NPR, citing a Stanford University study, Trump's pet-eating comments follow a trend of Republican Party messaging on immigration getting "more vitriolic".

Theologian Russell D. Moore noted that, from the standpoint of Christianity, "[t]o sing praise songs in a church service while trafficking in the bearing of false witness against people who fled for their lives, who are seeking to rebuild a life for their children after crushing poverty and persecution, is more than just cognitive dissonance. It's modeling the devil himself, whom Jesus called 'the father of lies' (Jn 8:44). That's especially true when the lies harm another person. 'Everyone who hates his brother is a murderer,' the apostle John wrote, 'and you know that no murderer has eternal life abiding in him' (1 Jn 3:15)."

In a podcast commenting on the controversy, New York Times columnist David French remarked that "MAGA likes inflicting pain on its political enemies. It likes and enjoys creating these ridiculous and absurd memes. It loves to provoke people who are on the outside. It's part of the joy of this MAGA movement that can include this extreme aggression online." French argues that there is "lot of fun and fellowship" inside the MAGA movement, and that aggressive promotion of controversies and memes, regardless of their truthfulness, is an integral part of the movement's online social dynamic: "...the core MAGA people who are pushing the memes out, look, if it's true, great. If it's not true, who cares? They're having a good time."

New York Times columnists Lydia Polgreen and Jamelle Bouie both describe the hoax as a blood libel, comparing it to the claim that Jewish people were using Christian children's blood for ceremonies, employed to enact violence on a minority group.

Last Week Tonight with John Oliver included a segment on the hoax and situation in Springfield, detailing the chronology whereby Vance fact-checked the rumors, was aware they were false, and tried to support them with poor evidence. He went on to criticize Vance's defense that, in Oliver's words, "'If enough people say it, I repeat it'? It is not ideal when an aspiring vice president’s guiding philosophy is indistinguishable from a fucking parrot's."

== See also ==
- African gangs moral panic – Moral panic in Australia
- Conspiracy theories in United States politics
- Great Replacement conspiracy theory § United States
  - Great Replacement conspiracy theory in the United States – View that political elites are deliberately increasing minority population
- List of conspiracy theories promoted by Donald Trump
- Rhetoric of Donald Trump
- Stochastic terrorism – Probabilistic link between public rhetoric and ideologically motivated violence
- Storm-1516
- Trumpism – American right-wing to far-right populist political ideology
- Voodoo in popular culture
