= Upper Valley Mall =

- Location: Near Springfield, Ohio
- Coordinates: 39°56′56″N 83°51′15″W
- Address: 1475 Upper Valley Pike
- Opened: August 2, 1971
- Closed: 2021
- Developer: Edward J. DeBartolo Corporation
- Owner: Clark County Land Reutilization Corp.
- Num. of stores: 13 (55 at peak)
- Num. of anchor tenants: All vacant
- Floor area: 267,466 sq ft (24,848 m^{2})
- Floors: 1 (2 in former Macy's)

Upper Valley Mall was a shopping mall located near Springfield, Ohio, northeast of Dayton. Built in 1971 by the Edward J. DeBartolo Corporation of Youngstown, the mall at closing had no anchor stores. The Upper Valley Mall was located west of Springfield, off US 68, in German Township, Clark County. The mall is currently owned by a private investment company. The Upper Valley Mall contained 267,466 sq ft (24,848 m^{2}) of floor space. The mall had room for 55 stores depending on layout.

== History ==
The Edward J. DeBartolo Corporation opened the Upper Valley Mall on August 2, 1971. At the time, it featured J. C. Penney, Sears, a two-story Rike's (later Shillito-Rike's, Lazarus, Lazarus-Macy's and finally Macy's), and Wren's (later Block's, a unit of Allied Stores), as its anchors. Another original tenant was an F. W. Woolworth Company dime store, which closed in January 1992.

Shortly after Federated Department Stores' 1987 purchase of Block's and its consolidation into Federated's Lazarus division, the Block's location was converted to additional sales space for Lazarus.

Anchor Elder-Beerman opened on October 2, 1992, replacing the Woolworth.

== Decline ==
Both Elder-Beerman and Old Navy closed in January 2013.

In March 2013, the Dayton Society of Natural History (DSNH) opened a satellite version of their main museum called the Boonshoft Museum of Discovery Springfield in an approximately 4000-square-foot space in the mall, moving to 20,000 square feet in the former Elder-Beerman space in November. On March 25, 2016, DSNH announced that it would close this satellite museum; it did so on April 30.

The mall went into receivership in July 2014, and by the end of the month, management was transferred from Indianapolis-based Simon Property Group (successor of DeBartolo) to Urban Retail Properties.

In spring 2015, Macy's and J. C. Penney closed their stores in the mall. The mall's cinema, an original tenant, closed on February 20, 2017.

In December 2016, the Macy's site was purchased by the Clark County Land Reutilization Corporation, a land bank, for about $200,000. In May 2018, the land bank purchased the rest of the site, exclusive of Sears, from its then-owner, Urban Retail Properties, for slightly more than $3 million.

On December 28, 2018, it was announced that Sears, the last anchor at the mall, would be closing as part of a plan to close 80 stores nationwide. The store closed on March 10, 2019, leaving the mall with no anchors.

It was reported in March 2019 (although not confirmed by Clark County) that Home Plate Sports Academy, an existing tenant, would expand and be part of the mall's redevelopment into a mixed-use sports complex including restaurants, retail, a hotel and a movie theater; the academy stated that it planned to complete the project in two years, but nothing ever came of the plan.

Victoria's Secret announced in January 2020 that it would close before the end of the month.

On December 16, 2020, the Clark County Commission voted to allow the Clark County Combined Health District to use the former J. C. Penney store for three months for COVID-19 vaccinations and testing. The clinic in fact operated until May 27, 2021.

=== Closure and redevelopment ===
On April 15, 2021 it was announced that the mall would permanently close to the public on June 16, 2021. County officials stated that the county had expected to only hold the property for a few months, pending a deal with a private developer which fell through. To date, the county has invested about $3.5 million into the mall. The mall's thirteen tenants, including Bath & Body Works; Spencer Gifts; GNC; Emporium, a local antique and consignment store; the Springfield Chess Club; and Mark Pi Express, a family-owned Chinese restaurant that was a 28-year tenant, were informed that they would have to vacate the mall by mid-June. The county reported that they had heard from potential buyers, and expected the mall property to be converted to mixed-use or light-industrial uses.

On June 9, 2021, Clark County announced that it had reached an agreement to sell the mall and its 76.8-acre (31.1 ha) property to Ohio-based developer Industrial Commercial Properties (ICP) for $2.25 million. Pending ICP's due diligence, the deal is expected to close in fall 2021. ICP's plans are to convert the mall to a mixed-use business park. The company says it has a track record of such projects, having converted malls, big-box stores and retail power centers to business parks. ICP touts a successful redevelopment of Randall Park Mall in North Randall (suburban Cleveland), as well as its proposed redevelopment of Chapel Hill Mall in Akron.

The mall closed as scheduled on June 16, 2021. On June 24, the county announced that it would donate any materials from the mall to the Clark County Heritage Center for historic preservation. Of particular note are the mall's Peanuts characters Christmas displays.
