= Robert C. Henry =

American politician (1921–1981)

Mayor of Springfield, Ohio
- In office 1966–1968
- Preceded by: Maurice K. Baach
- Succeeded by: Betty Brunk

Personal details
- Born: Robert Clayton Henry; July 16, 1921 Springfield, Ohio, U.S.
- Died: September 8, 1981 (aged 60) Good Shepherd Village, Springfield, Ohio, U.S.
- Cause of death: Cancer
- Resting place: Ferncliff Cemetery; Springfield, Ohio, U.S.A
- Party: Republican
- Spouse: Betty Jane Scott
- Children: Robert C. Henry II, Alan Henry, Lisa Henry
- Education: Wittenberg University; Cleveland College of Mortuary Science
- Occupation: Politician, funeral director

Robert Clayton Henry (July 16, 1921 – September 8, 1981) was an American politician who served as Mayor of Springfield, Ohio from 1966 to 1968 as one of the first black mayors of a midwestern city; however, this achievement is frequently overshadowed by fellow African American mayor Carl B. Stokes, who was elected mayor of Cleveland in 1967.

== Biography ==
Henry was born in Springfield, a son of Guy Henry and Nellie Reed. He attended Wittenberg University in Springfield and the Cleveland College of Mortuary Science in Cleveland, Ohio for his degree in mortuary studies. He was awarded an honorary Doctor of Humane Letters degree from Central State University in 1968.

Henry was elected to Springfield's city commission in 1961, and began his term in January 1962. The commission then appointed him as the city's mayor in 1966, succeeding Maurice K. Baach, the city's first Jewish mayor. In 1968, he refused to run for re-election (his successor, Betty Brunk, was Springfield's first female mayor), but remained on the city commission. After finishing his term as mayor, Henry was selected as a member of a fact-finding commission to Vietnam by order of then-president, Lyndon Johnson, and later returned in 1970 under Richard M. Nixon to inspect non-military activities. In 1972, he was the Republican Party nominee for the 60th District seat in the Ohio House of Representatives, but lost in the general election.

Robert C. Henry Funeral Home

Aside from his political career, Henry was also the owner and operator of the Robert C. Henry Funeral Home, founded in 1951. He also continued to serve as head of charity drives and numerous civic organizations in the Springfield area. He was honored by a parade and banquet in Springfield on Robert C. Henry Day during Black History Month. A fountain in downtown Springfield was dedicated to his memory, and a retirement home complex also bears his name.

Henry died in 1981 after a battle with cancer. His remains are interred in Ferncliff Cemetery Mausoleum.

Henry's former son-in-law, Tim Ayers, was also a member of Springfield's city commission, and later, mayor. All three of Henry's children currently reside in Springfield, where they continue to operate the funeral home that bears his name. It is one of few, if not the only, second-generation African-American-owned and -operated businesses in Springfield.

== See also ==
- List of mayors of Springfield, Ohio
- List of first African-American mayors
