= List of mayors of Springfield, Ohio =

The following is a list of mayors of the city of Springfield, Ohio, United States.

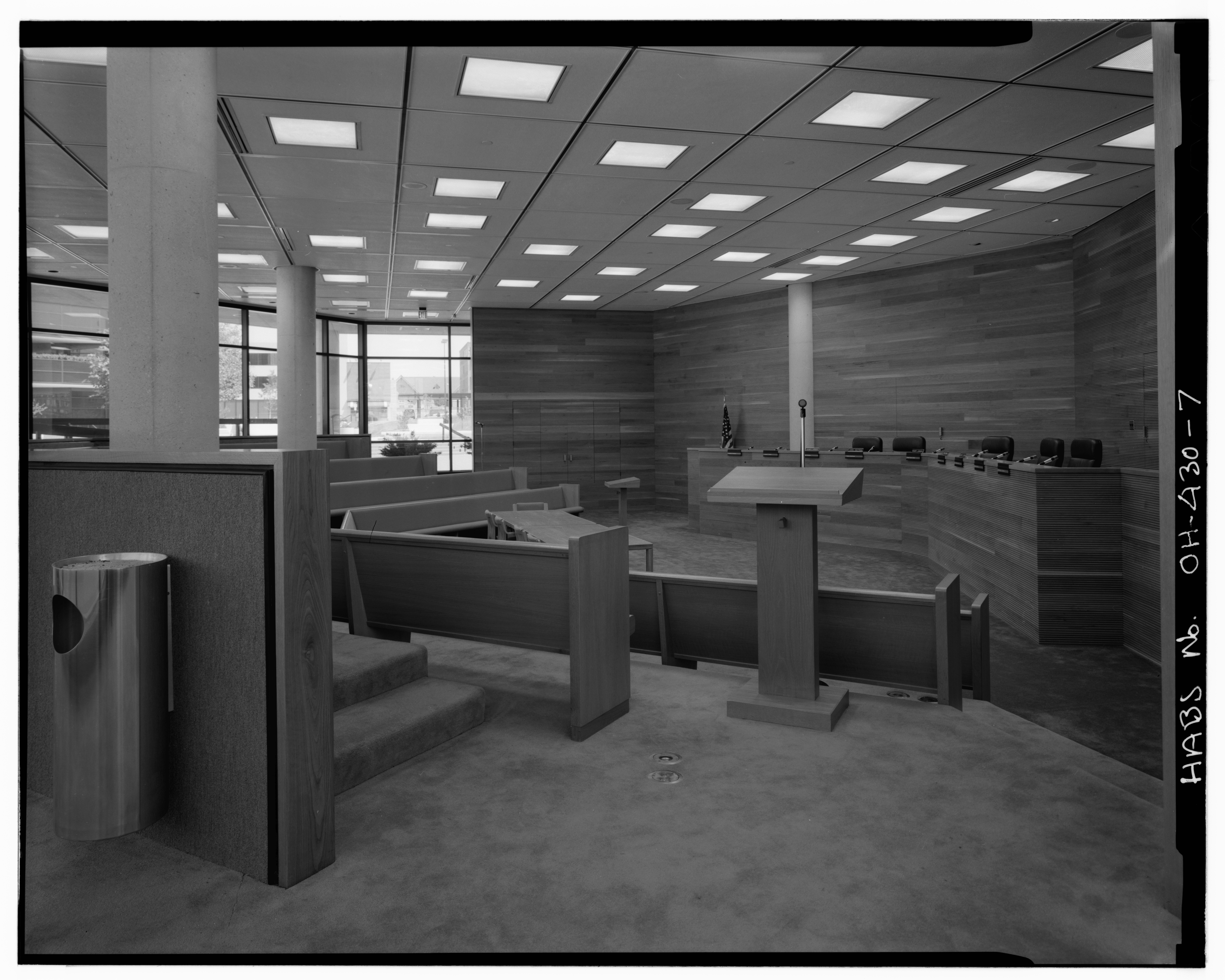
Council chamber in city hall building in Springfield, Ohio (photo 1979)

== Presidents ==
- Edward H. Cumming, 1834
- W. V. A. Cushing, 1835
- Samson Hubble, 1836
- Reuben Miller, 1837-1840
- John Murdock, 1841
- William Moore, 1842-1844, 1846-1849
- Steven Bell, 1845

== Mayors ==
- James M. Hunt, 1850-1853
- James S. Goode, 1854-1856
- A. G. Burnett, 1857-1860
- John C. Miller, 1861
- William David Hill, c.1861-1862
- J. J. Snyder, 1863-1865, 1867-1868
- James Fleming, 1866
- Jacob R. McGarry, 1869-1870
- J. J. Hanna, 1871-1874
- Milton Cole, 1875-1879
- Edward S. Wallace, 1880
- E. G. Coffin, 1881-1882
- Charles W. Constantine, 1883-1884
- James P. Goodwin, 1885-1886
- Oliver S. Kelly, 1887-1888
- W. R. Burnett, 1889-1892, 1908
- James Granville Johnson Jr., 1893-1894
- P. P. Mast, 1895-1896
- John M. Good, 1897-1898
- Charles J. Bowlus, 1899-1900, 1903-1904
- M. L. Milligan, c.1901-1902
- James M. Todd, 1905-1906
- Charles P. Baxter, c.1937
- John H. Horstman, c.1953
- Carleton Davidson, c.1954
- Maurice K. Baach, c.1965
- Robert C. Henry, 1966-1968, 1st African American mayor
- Betty Brunk, c.1969
- Robert L. Burton Jr. 1973-1983, 2nd African American mayor
- Tim Ayers, 1984–1990, 3rd African American mayor
- Warren Copeland, 1990-1994,
- Dale Henry, 1994-1995, 4th African American mayor
- Kevin O'Neill, 1996 - 1997
- Warren Copeland, 1998-2023
- Rob Rue, 2024-present

== See also ==
- Springfield City Hall (Ohio)
- Springfield history
