= Tim Ayers =

American politician (born 1958)

Honorable Tim Ayers
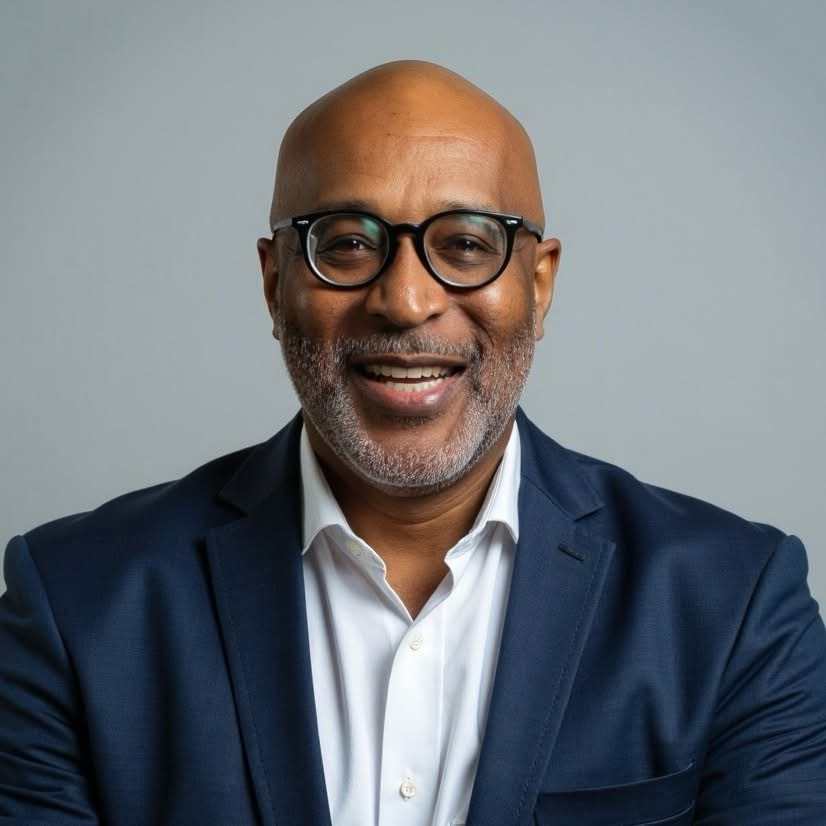

Mayor of Springfield, Ohio
- In office 1984–1990
- Succeeded by: Warren Copeland

Personal details
- Born: Timothy Frederick Ayers; November 19, 1958 (age 67) Springfield, Ohio, U.S.
- Party: Democratic
- Spouse(s): Lisa Henry; Robin Brown
- Children: Katheryne, Joseph, Perry
- Education: Capital University (Columbus, Ohio)
- Occupation: Teacher

Timothy Frederick Ayers (born November 19, 1958) served as Mayor and City Commissioner of Springfield, Ohio from 1984 to 1990. He previously served as the Legislative Message Clerk of the Ohio House of Representatives for the 113th General Assembly and Small Business Manager for the Nashville Chamber of Commerce.

== Personal life ==
Timothy Ayers was born in Springfield, Ohio, the sixth child of Franklin Ayers and Betty Rae Basey. He has three children.

His brother, former OSU Buckeyes head coach, Randy Ayers, has been a scout for the Brooklyn Nets professional basketball team since November 3, 2015.

== Political life ==
- 1980-1984, Assistant Clerk in the Ohio House of Representatives
- 1984-1990, Mayor, Springfield, Ohio
- 1990, Special Assistant, Ohio Department of Agriculture, administration of Governor Richard Celeste
- 2000, Tennessee State Democrative Executive Committeemen

== Notable achievements ==
- Assisted $2.5 million in loans to small businesses as the Small Business Manager of the Nashville Area Chamber of Commerce.
- Authored a $750,000 HUD grant to kick-start economic development activities in the historic neighborhood of Fisk University, Meharry Medical College and Tennessee State University in 2001. Since that grant, an additional $2.5 million of investment has poured into the area.
- Selected one of Kentucky's Minority Educator and Retention Award winners

== See also ==
- List of mayors of Springfield, Ohio
