= Rob Rue =

American politician

Mayor of Springfield, Ohio
- Incumbent
- Assumed office January 2, 2024
- Preceded by: Warren Copeland

Personal details
- Party: Republican
- Education: Heidelberg University; Cincinnati College of Mortuary Science

Rob Rue is an American politician serving as the mayor of Springfield, Ohio, a position he assumed in 2024 after previously serving as city commissioner and assistant mayor. A Republican, he has focused on policies to attract jobs and development to Springfield, advocated for budget restraint, and publicly addressed local tensions surrounding immigration and city resources, gaining national attention during the Springfield pet-eating hoax and the 2024 U.S. presidential election.

== Early life ==
Rue grew up in Springfield, Ohio and graduated from North High School in 1988. He earned a B.A. in business administration from Heidelberg University and a Bachelor of Mortuary Science from Cincinnati College of Mortuary Science.

== Career ==
=== Early career ===
Rue is the co-owner of Littleton and Rue Funeral Home and Crematory in Springfield.

In 2017, Rue began his public service career as a city commissioner in Springfield. During his time in this role, he developed a reputation as a centrist willing to support policies beyond traditional conservative positions. Rue is a Republican. He voted to add protections for LGBTQ residents to the city’s nondiscrimination ordinance, stating that he believed residents should not face discrimination based on their lifestyles. Rue focused on attracting jobs and people to Springfield. He advocated for making the city more welcoming to businesses and new development. He opposed reinstating red light cameras in Springfield. Rue opposed renewing a temporary 0.4% income tax increase passed in 2017. He pledged to keep the tax increase temporary if elected and advocated for budget cuts instead of further tax increases. During his tenure, he represented the city on several boards, including the Clark County Land Bank and the National Trails Parks and Recreation District. In January 2022, Rue was named the assistant mayor.

=== Mayor of Springfield, Ohio ===
In November 2023, Rue ran unopposed for the role of mayor, following the early resignation of longtime mayor Warren Copeland. Copeland, who had served Springfield for over two decades, stepped down amid health concerns and increasing public discontent, particularly surrounding the influx of immigrants into the area. Rue formally took office as mayor later that month, after winning the election. He began his term as mayor during the regularly scheduled commission meeting on January 2, 2024. Springfield’s city structure classifies the mayor’s position as part-time, with operational responsibilities largely managed by a city manager. Rue's role as mayor, therefore, comes with an annual salary of under $15,000.

In January 2024, Rue emphasized that Springfield now has its first majority female commission and one of its most generationally diverse leadership teams. At his swearing in ceremony, addressed challenges related to Springfield’s growing immigrant population, pledging efforts to ensure a safe and inclusive environment for all residents. Rue faced rising tensions associated with the arrival of Haitian immigrants who had taken entry-level jobs in the local manufacturing sector, reversing decades of population decline but placing additional demands on Springfield’s public services, including health clinics, schools, and housing.

==== 2024 Springfield pet-eating hoax ====
In 2024, the city attracted national attention after former U.S. President Donald Trump made unsubstantiated claims that Haitian immigrants in Springfield were responsible for abducting household pets. Rue sought to counter these claims, appearing on national news to clarify the situation and to reassure the community. During the Springfield pet-eating hoax, Rue declared a state of emergency for Springfield, allowing the city to allocate additional security resources in response to the heightened attention and potential for unrest. He made multiple media appearances with city manager Bryan Heck, including on Fox & Friends, where they discussed the strain on city resources and requested additional support from the federal government. Rue also publicly addressed and managed contentious city commission meetings, at one point removing a neo-Nazi group leader after the individual urged the city to turn away Haitian immigrants, citing city regulations prohibiting threatening speech at meetings. Rue’s approach to handling the political and social issues surrounding immigration in Springfield led to increased public visibility, both locally and nationally. He has reported receiving threats directed toward himself and his family as a result of his public stance and decisions.

== See also ==
- List of mayors of Springfield, Ohio
