= Clark County Heritage Center =

Coordinates: 39.922819°N 83.810779°W

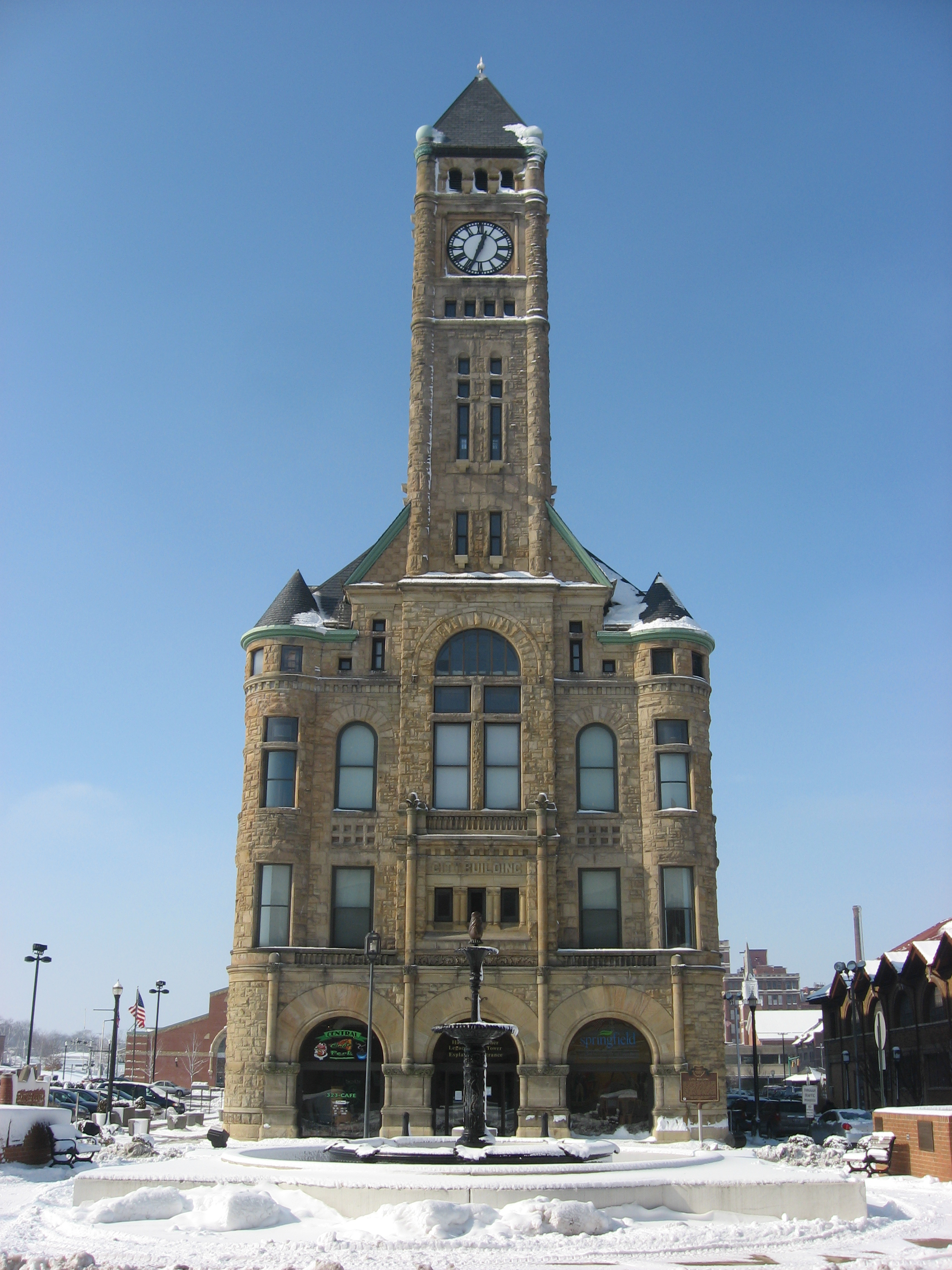
- The former Municipal Building (Springfield, Ohio)
- Location: S. Fountain Ave. between High and Washington Sts., Springfield, Ohio
- Type: History Museum
- Website: heritage.center

The Clark County Heritage Center is a Romanesque Revival-style building, specifically Richardsonian Romanesque, in central Springfield, Ohio, United States. Originally built for the city's offices in 1890, it was replaced in 1979 with the current Springfield City Hall and is now the location of the Clark County Historical Society (founded in 1897), which includes a museum, research library and archives. The building has been listed on the National Register of Historic Places.

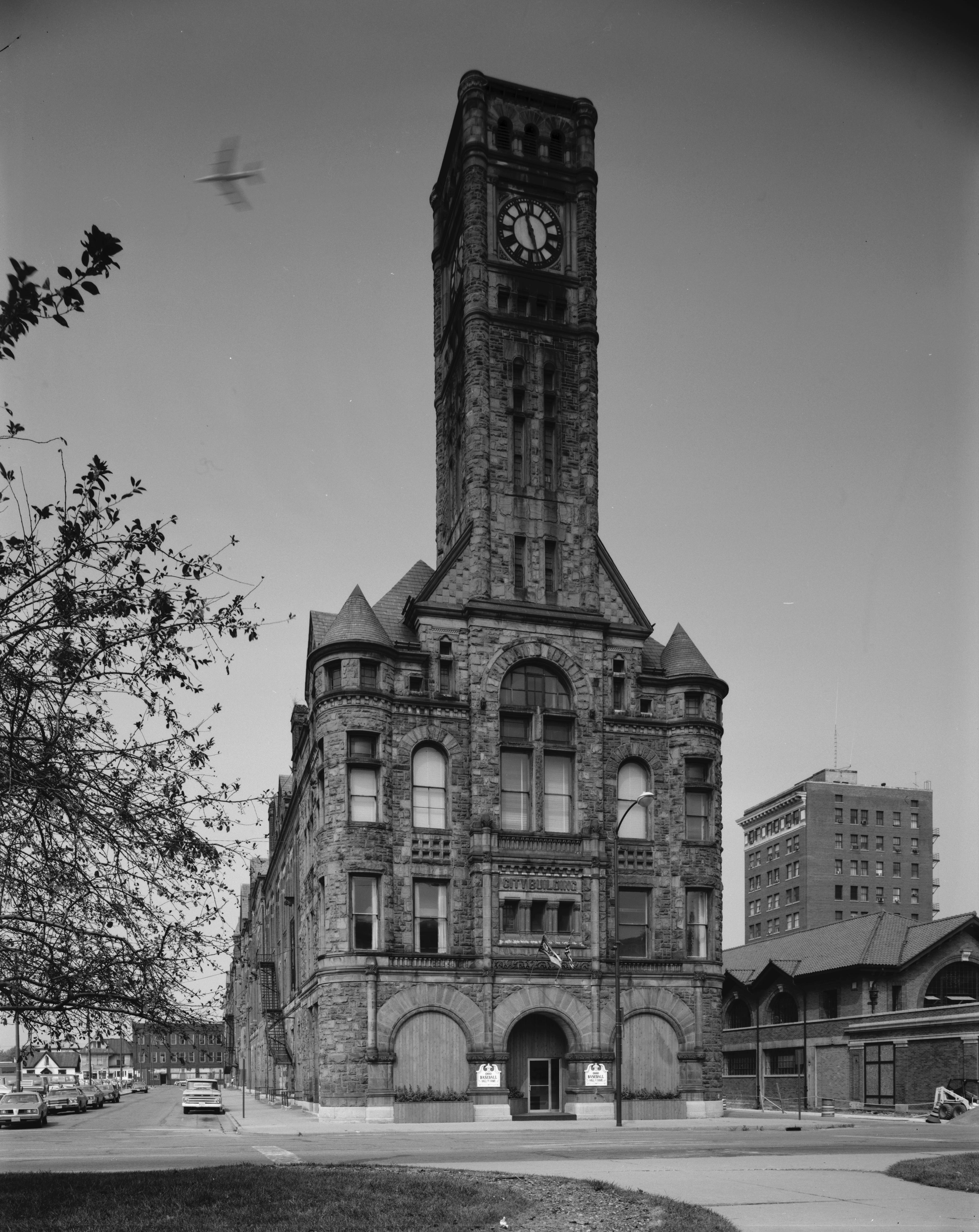
Municipal building in a summer 1981 black-and-white photograph

== See also ==
- National Register of Historic Places listings in Clark County, Ohio
