= Springfield, Ohio =

City in the United States

- City
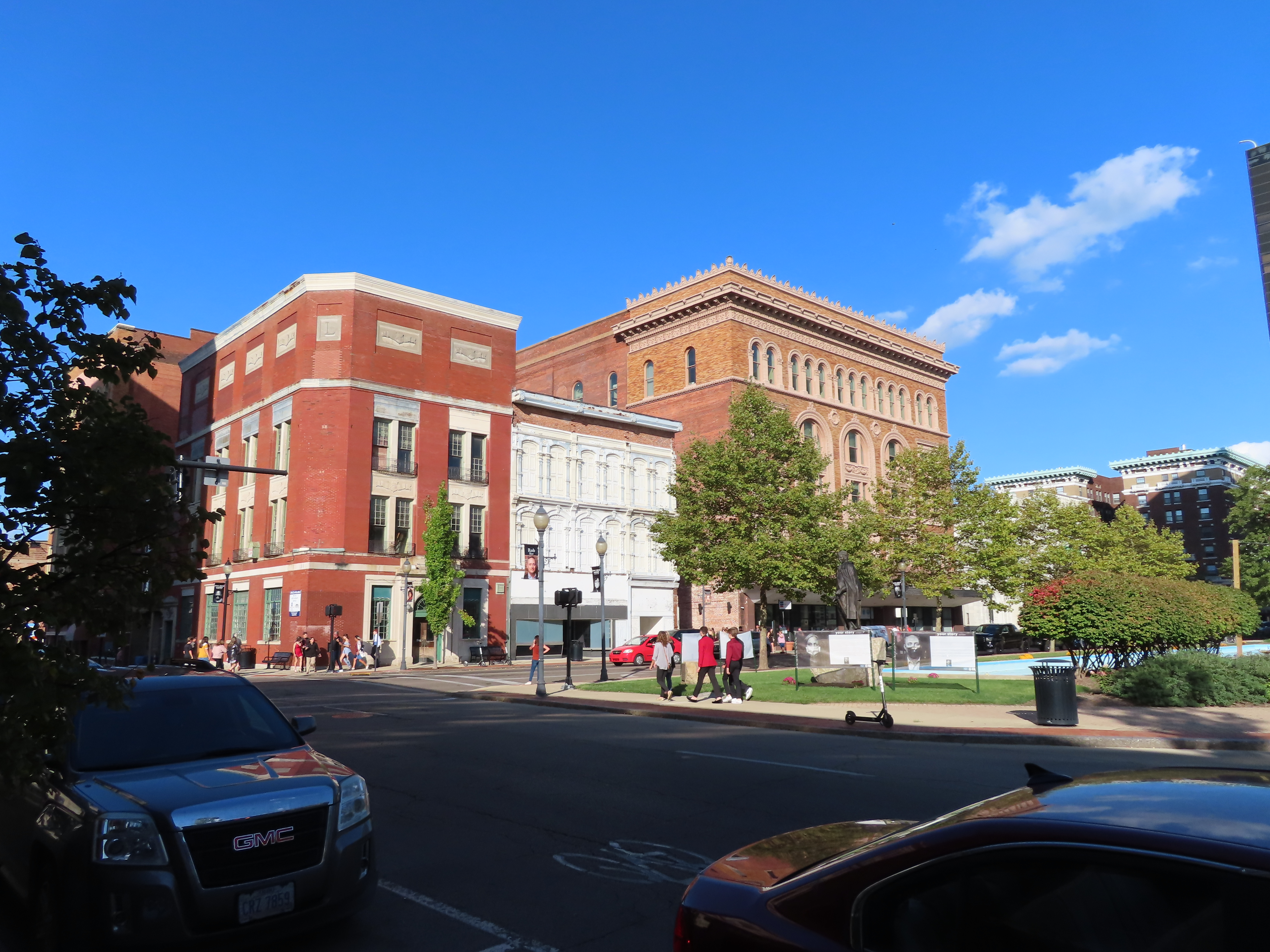
- Downtown Springfield in 2021

- Flag Seal Logo
- Nicknames: The Home City, The Rose City (City of Roses), The Champion City, The Field
- Interactive map of Springfield, Ohio
- Location within Ohio Location within the United States
- Coordinates: 39°55′12″N 83°46′15″W
- Country: United States
- State: Ohio
- County: Clark
- Founded: 1801
- Incorporated: 1827 (village); 1850 (city)

Government
  - Type: Council–manager
  - Mayor: Rob Rue (R)

Area
  - City: 26.36 sq mi (68.27 km^{2})
  - Land: 26.16 sq mi (67.75 km^{2})
  - Water: 0.20 sq mi (0.52 km^{2})
- Elevation: 929 ft (283 m)

Population (2020)
  - City: 58,662
  - Density: 2,243/sq mi (865.9/km^{2})
  - Metro: 136,001
- Time zone: UTC−5 (EST)
  - Summer (DST): UTC−4 (EDT)
- ZIP Codes: 45501–45506
- Area code: 937 & 326
- FIPS code: 39-74118
- GNIS ID: 1085859
- Website: springfieldohio.gov

Springfield is a city in Clark County, Ohio, United States, and its county seat. It is located in southwestern Ohio along the Mad River, Buck Creek, and Beaver Creek, about 45 miles (72 km) west of Columbus and 25 miles (40 km) northeast of Dayton. The city had a total population of 58,662 at the 2020 census, while the Springfield metropolitan area had 136,001 residents.

Springfield is home to Wittenberg University, a liberal arts college, and Clark State College, a community college. The Little Miami Scenic Trail, a paved rail-trail that is nearly 80 mi (130 km) long, extends from the Buck Creek Scenic Trail head in Springfield south to Newtown, Ohio. Buck Creek State Park and its Clarence J. Brown reservoir are located at the city limits.

Beginning around 2018, Springfield became home to a large Haitian immigrant community, estimated at 15,000 to 20,000 people by 2024. That year, false claims that Haitian immigrants were eating pets spread nationally during the presidential campaign, drawing international attention to the city.

== History ==
=== Before European settlement ===
The original pre-contact inhabitants of Springfield were the Shawnee people.

During the 18th century, the Ohio Country saw warfare, waves of migration and displacement, and imposition of claims by rivaling colonial powers France and Britain. With the end of the French and Indian War in 1763, the British became the sole European claimants of the region.

The area was home to the major Shawnee village in the region, called Peckuwe or Piqua. It belonged to the Shawnee septs (sub-clans) of Pekowi and Kispoko and had a population of about 3,000. It stood at 39° 54.5′ N, 83° 54.68′ W, less than four miles southwest of the current city of Springfield and less than six miles from its center.

During the Western theater of the American Revolutionary War, the area saw a major battle that pitted the Americans against the Shawnee and their indigenous allies. The Shawnees had formed an alliance with the British and the Lenape, the Wyandot, and the Mingo, refugees from warfare and displacements elsewhere, and had been raiding into Kentucky with the aim of driving out American settlers. On August 8, 1780, Piqua was attacked by American soldiers under the command of General George Rogers Clark. It was a ferocious battle that ended with the destruction of the Shawnee village and the exodus of its inhabitants. Clark's men spent two days burning as much as 500 acres of corn surrounding the village.

Tecumseh, the Shawnee chief and warrior who later took part in the war of resistance against the U.S. and its expansionist settlement policy, lived in Piqua from 1777 until 1780.

The Springfield area was officially ceded to the United States by the Shawnee and their indigenous allies under the Treaty of Greenville on 1795, six years before the settlement which became Springfield was founded.

=== Early settlement ===
Springfield was founded in 1801 by European-American James Demint, a former teamster from Kentucky who named it for Springfield, Massachusetts. When Clark County was created in 1818 from parts of Champaign, Madison, and Greene counties, Springfield was chosen by the legislature over the village of New Boston as the county seat, winning by two votes.

Early growth in Springfield was stimulated by federal construction of the National Road, which was extended to the city in 1838. For about a decade thereafter, Springfield served as the western terminus while politicians wrangled over its future route, and it became known as the "Town at the End of the Pike". Representatives of Dayton and Eaton wanted the road to veer south after Springfield, but President Andrew Jackson, who took office in 1829, decided to push the road straight west to Richmond, Indiana.

=== Industrial development ===
During the mid-and-late 19th century, the manufacturing industry began to flourish in Springfield. Industrialists included Oliver S. Kelly, James Leffel, P. P. Mast, Benjamin H. Warder, and Asa S. Bushnell, who built the self-named Bushnell Building. Springfield became known as "The Champion City", a reference to the Champion Farm Equipment brand. Champion was manufactured by the Warder, Bushnell & Glessner Company, absorbed into International Harvester in 1902.

International Harvester, a manufacturer of farm machinery and later trucks, became the leading local industry after 1856, when Springfield native William Whiteley invented a self-raking reaper and mower. In 1877, P. P. Mast started Farm & Fireside magazine to promote the products of his agricultural equipment company. His publishing company, known as Mast, Crowell, and Kirkpatrick, eventually developed as the Crowell-Collier Publishing Company, best known for publishing Collier's Weekly. International Harvester and Crowell-Collier Publishing would be the city's major employers throughout most of the next century.

In 1894, The Kelly Springfield Tire Company was founded in the city. Harry Aubrey Toulmin, Sr., patent attorney to the Wright Brothers, wrote the 1904 patent to their invention of the airplane at the Bushnell Building, eventually granted to the brothers in 1906.

At the turn of the 20th century, Springfield became known as the "Home City". It was a period of high activity by fraternal organizations, and such lodges as the Masonic Lodge, Knights of Pythias, and Odd Fellows built homes for orphans and aged members of their orders.

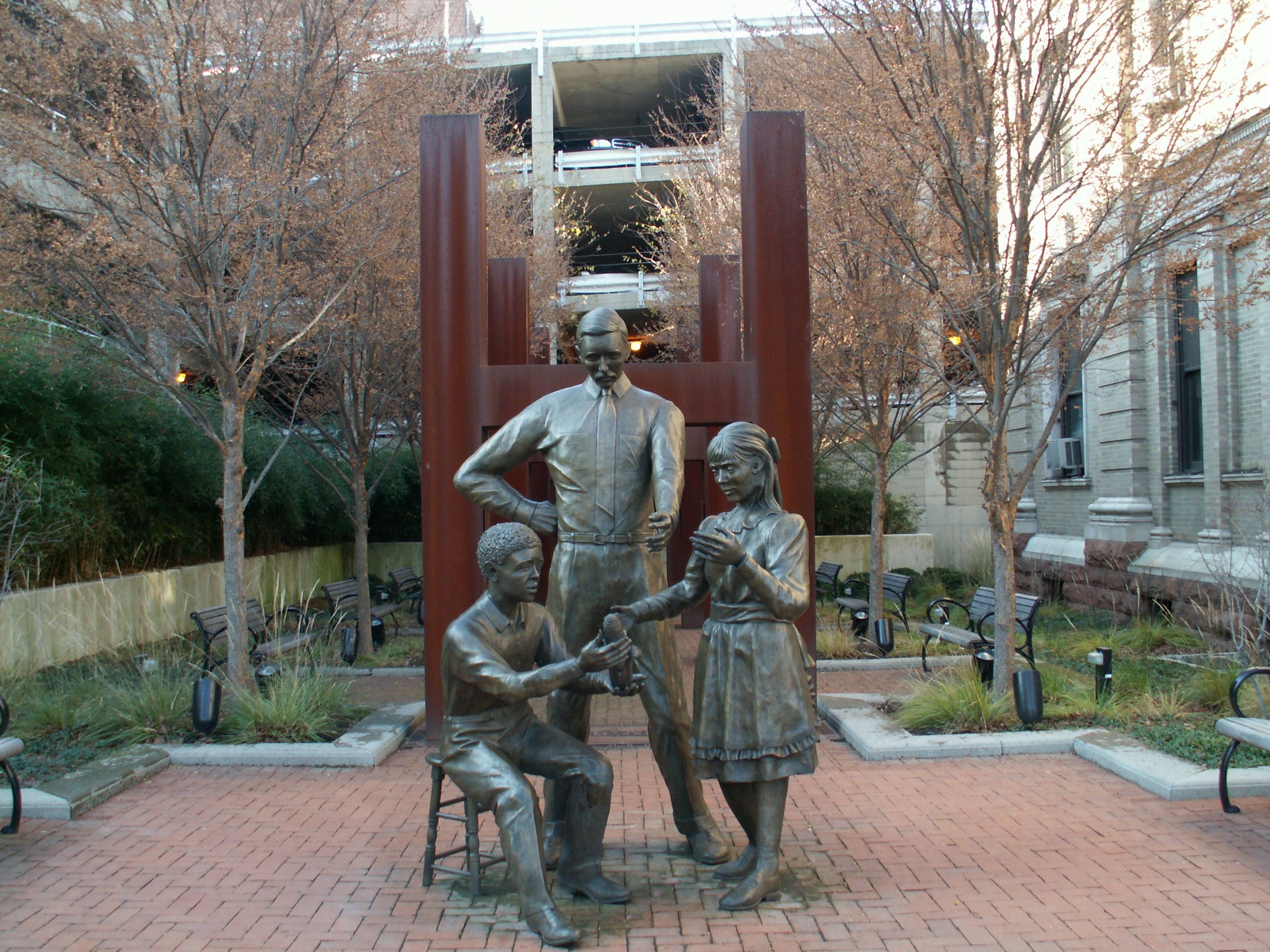
A statue depicting AB Graham and the first 4-H club

That same year, A.B. Graham, then the superintendent of schools for Springfield Township in Clark County, established a "Boys' and Girls' Agricultural Club". About 85 children, 10 to 15 years of age, attended the first meeting on January 15, 1902, in Springfield, in the basement of the Clark County Courthouse. This was the start of what would soon be called the "4-H Club"; it expanded to become a nationwide organization at a time when agriculture was a mainstay of the economy in many regions. The first projects included food preservation, gardening, and elementary agriculture. Today, a historical marker exists at the Clark County courthouse, and the Library of Congress officially recognized the birthplace in 2023.

On March 7, 1904, over a thousand white residents formed a lynch mob, stormed the jail, and removed prisoner Richard Dixon, a black man accused of killing police officer Charles B. Collis. Dixon was shot to death and then hanged from a pole on the corner of Fountain and Main Street, where the mob shot his body numerous times. From there, the mob rioted through the town, destroying and burning much of the black area. The Ohio National Guard was called out to quell the riot, but none of the rioters were ever charged. The events were covered by national newspapers and provoked outrage. On February 26, 1906, an altercation between a white man and a black man resulted in another riot that had to be put down by the Ohio National Guard. The rioters burned down much of the Levee, a predominantly black neighborhood located in a flood-prone area near the river. Nearly 100 people were left homeless. The final riot took place in 1921. The New York Times reported that 14 people were killed during the unrest.

From 1916 to 1926, 10 automobile companies operated in Springfield. Among them were the Bramwell, Brenning, Foos, Frayer-Miller, Kelly Steam, Russell-Springfield, and Westcott. The Westcott, known as "the car built to last", was a six-cylinder four-door sedan manufactured by Burton J. Westcott of the Westcott Motor Car Company.

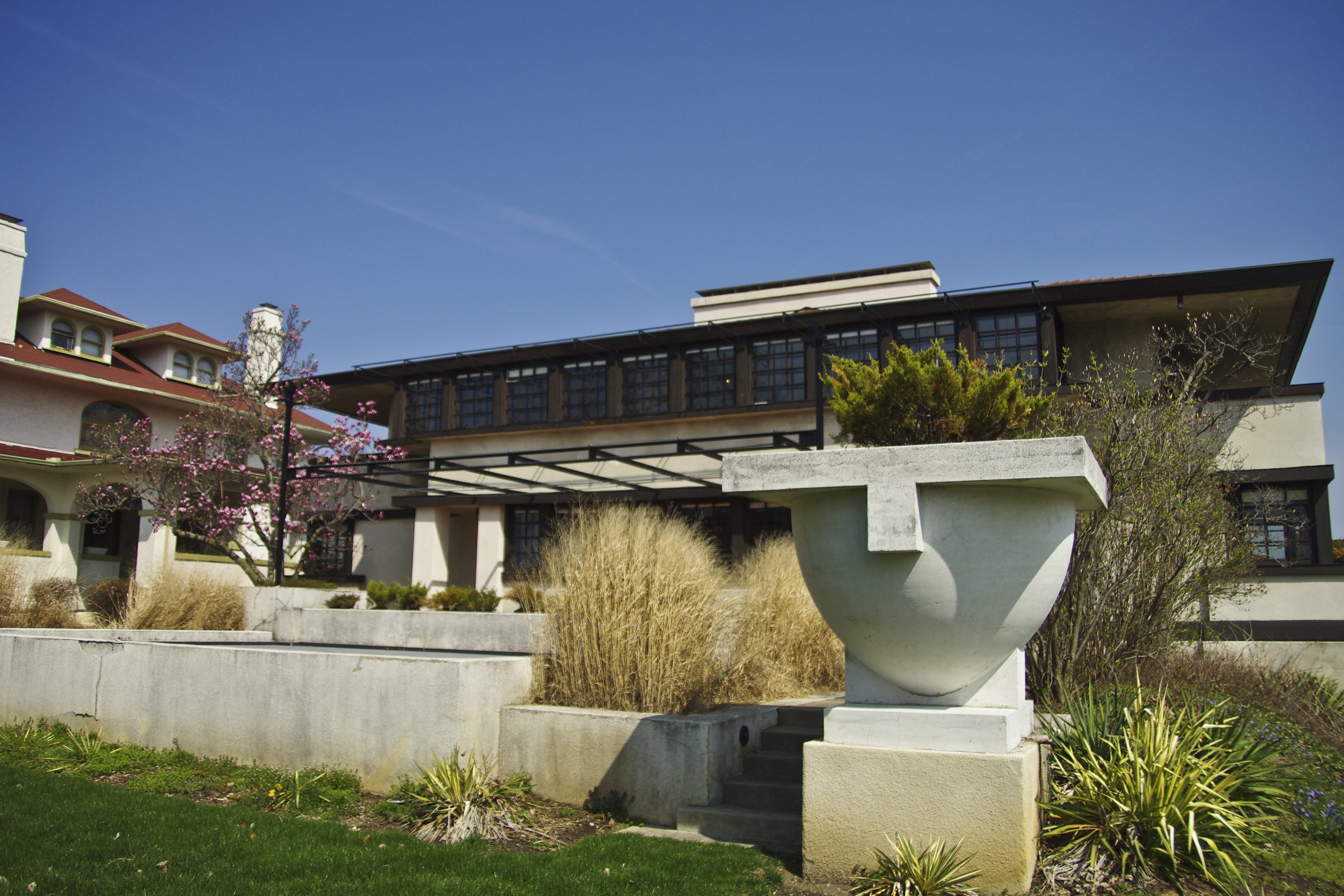
Westcott House by Frank Lloyd Wright

In 1908, Westcott and his wife Orpha commissioned architect Frank Lloyd Wright to design their home at 1340 East High Street. The Westcott House, a sprawling two-story stucco and concrete house, has all the features of Wright's "prairie style", including horizontal lines, low-pitched roof, and broad eaves. Wright became world-renowned, and this is his only prairie-style house in the state of Ohio. In 2000, the property was purchased by the Chicago-based Frank Lloyd Wright Building Conservancy. As part of a prearranged plan, the house was sold to the Westcott House Foundation, a newly formed group that managed an extensive 5-year, $5.8 million restoration, completed in October 2005. The house is now open to the public for guided tours.

=== Late 20th century to present ===
Crowell-Collier Publishing, a longtime pillar of local employment, closed its magazines in 1957 and sold its Springfield printing plant. The city population peaked at more than 82,000 in the 1960 census.

In 1966, Robert C. Henry was appointed by the city commission as mayor, making him the first black mayor of an Ohio city.

In 1983, Newsweek called Springfield one of America's "dream cities". But the issue, which marked the magazine's 50th anniversary issue, concluded that "The American Dream" was in decline.

The decline in manufacturing and other blue-collar industries in the United States in the late 20th and early 21st centuries hit Springfield especially hard. In 2011, Gallup called Springfield the "unhappiest city" in the country. Its 27% decrease in median income between 1999 and 2014 was the largest of any metropolitan area in the country. By 2020, the population had declined to 58,662, down more than one-quarter from its peak.

By the mid-2010s, city leaders began revitalization of the downtown area, including residential housing, a parking garage and demolition of decayed structures. New downtown structures built since 2000 include the Ohio Valley Surgical Hospital, Springfield Regional Medical Center, Mother Stewart's Brewing Company, and the Chiller Ice Arena. As of 2018, the economic recovery enjoyed by larger cities since the Great Recession had not included Springfield, despite efforts by local politicians and business organizations.

In 2021, the Upper Valley Mall, which had operated as the city's retail hub since 1971, permanently closed.

==== Immigrant influx ====
In 2014, the city began the "Welcome Springfield" initiative to attract immigrants in an attempt to improve the local economy. About four years later, Haitian immigrants fleeing their country's deepening crisis began to arrive.

By 2024, an estimated 15,000 to 20,000 Haitian immigrants had settled in the city. The vast majority later received temporary protected status, which allows them to work without the fear of deportation, due to the crisis in Haiti. Many were drawn by jobs with Springfield's growing manufacturing sector, which includes companies such as Topre, Silfex, and McGregor Metal.

The influx of Haitians triggered an increase in anti-immigrant sentiment among existing residents. In August 2023, tensions were aggravated when an improperly licensed Haitian driver crashed into a school bus, killing one child and injuring 23 others. In mid-2024, local politicians asked for federal assistance to fund an unexpected increased use of city services and to help with housing issues caused by the population increase. Community organizations have hired significant numbers of Haitian Creole translators.

==== National attention ====
In 2024, the city drew international attention over baseless claims about local Haitian immigrants, leading to dozens of bomb threats that forced school evacuations, government office closures, and other disruptions. On August 26, police received a report of Haitians stealing geese, for which neither law enforcement officials nor the Ohio Department of Natural Resources found any evidence or suspects. Soon thereafter, a rumor about Haitian immigrants abducting and eating pets in Springfield went viral. Springfield authorities debunked the rumor.

The false claims were amplified by JD Vance, a U.S. senator from Ohio and Republican vice-presidential candidate, other Republican politicians, and right-wing commentators. On September 10, Republican presidential candidate Donald Trump amplified the false claims during his presidential debate with Kamala Harris. Over the following week, Trump repeated these false claims, adding a vow to mass-deport "migrants" from Springfield. Meanwhile, unknown perpetrators began making dozens of bomb threats to Springfield schools, city officials and employees, and municipal offices, forcing several days of evacuations, lockdowns, closures, and cancellations. Five schools were evacuated during their school days, and two more closed for a day. City Hall and several municipal and county buildings were closed for one or more days. Two hospitals were locked down for part of a day. Two local colleges moved classes online for one or more days. Several grocery stores throughout the city were also closed due to bomb threats. The episode drew national and international attention to Springfield.

Haitian Americans in Springfield have faced race-based attacks due to these false claims. After Donald Trump won the 2024 United States presidential election, some Haitians expressed an interest in moving out of Springfield. A 2026 Washington Post article stated that there was a decline in the Haitian population.

After temporary protected status for Haitians ended in 2026, some Springfield residents were required to wear GPS ankle monitors. On October 21, 2026, Haitian residents and faith leaders began a march of about 40 miles from Springfield to the Ohio Statehouse in Columbus, asking the Department of Homeland Security to stop using the monitors and to grant Haitians permanent protection.

== Geography ==
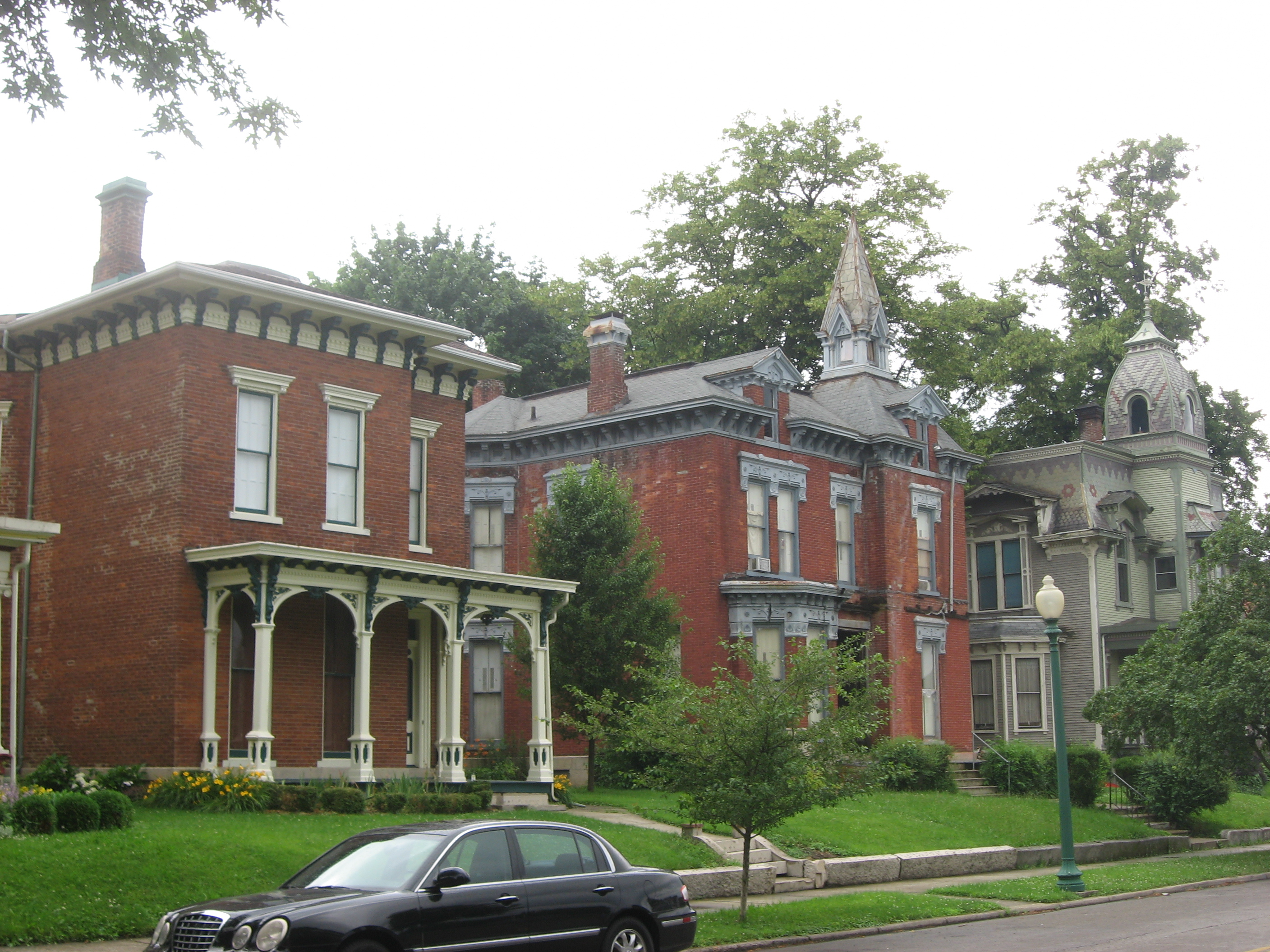
South Fountain Avenue Historic District

According to the United States Census Bureau, the city has a total area of 25.50 square miles (66.04 km^{2}), of which, 25.29 square miles (65.50 km^{2}) is land and 0.21 square miles (0.54 km^{2}) is water. The Clarence J. Brown Reservoir is located on the northeast outskirts of Springfield.

=== Climate ===
Springfield experiences a humid continental climate with cold winters and hot summers.

Climate data for Springfield, Ohio (Springfield Water Treatment Plant) (1991–2020 normals, extremes 1943–present)
Month	Jan	Feb	Mar	Apr	May	Jun	Jul	Aug	Sep	Oct	Nov	Dec	Year
Record high °F (°C)	73 (23)	76 (24)	85 (29)	93 (34)	94 (34)	103 (39)	103 (39)	102 (39)	102 (39)	91 (33)	80 (27)	72 (22)	103 (39)
Mean maximum °F (°C)	58.8 (14.9)	62.7 (17.1)	71.8 (22.1)	80.3 (26.8)	86.2 (30.1)	90.8 (32.7)	91.7 (33.2)	91.2 (32.9)	89.7 (32.1)	82.0 (27.8)	70.1 (21.2)	61.7 (16.5)	93.3 (34.1)
Mean daily maximum °F (°C)	35.9 (2.2)	39.5 (4.2)	49.6 (9.8)	62.6 (17.0)	72.6 (22.6)	81.2 (27.3)	83.9 (28.8)	83.1 (28.4)	77.7 (25.4)	65.3 (18.5)	51.8 (11.0)	40.7 (4.8)	62.0 (16.7)
Daily mean °F (°C)	27.2 (−2.7)	29.9 (−1.2)	39.0 (3.9)	50.4 (10.2)	61.0 (16.1)	70.0 (21.1)	72.9 (22.7)	71.4 (21.9)	64.9 (18.3)	53.3 (11.8)	41.6 (5.3)	32.5 (0.3)	51.2 (10.7)
Mean daily minimum °F (°C)	18.5 (−7.5)	20.2 (−6.6)	28.4 (−2.0)	38.2 (3.4)	49.4 (9.7)	58.8 (14.9)	61.8 (16.6)	59.8 (15.4)	52.2 (11.2)	41.3 (5.2)	31.4 (−0.3)	24.2 (−4.3)	40.4 (4.7)
Mean minimum °F (°C)	−2.9 (−19.4)	1.7 (−16.8)	11.1 (−11.6)	23.6 (−4.7)	35.0 (1.7)	46.0 (7.8)	52.0 (11.1)	49.6 (9.8)	39.4 (4.1)	28.2 (−2.1)	17.8 (−7.9)	6.9 (−13.9)	−6.3 (−21.3)
Record low °F (°C)	−26 (−32)	−18 (−28)	−13 (−25)	14 (−10)	26 (−3)	34 (1)	43 (6)	39 (4)	29 (−2)	15 (−9)	0 (−18)	−26 (−32)	−26 (−32)
Average precipitation inches (mm)	2.69 (68)	2.10 (53)	2.94 (75)	3.96 (101)	4.59 (117)	4.48 (114)	4.55 (116)	3.28 (83)	3.39 (86)	2.83 (72)	2.80 (71)	2.64 (67)	40.25 (1,022)
Average precipitation days (≥ 0.01 in)	11.8	9.3	10.1	12.8	14.4	12.7	10.9	8.9	9.0	9.6	9.6	11.4	130.5
Source: NOAA

== Demographics ==
Historical population
Census	Pop.	Note	%±
1810	593		—
1820	1,868		215.0%
1830	1,080		−42.2%
1840	2,062		90.9%
1850	5,108		147.7%
1860	7,002		37.1%
1870	12,652		80.7%
1880	20,730		63.8%
1890	31,895		53.9%
1900	38,253		19.9%
1910	46,921		22.7%
1920	60,840		29.7%
1930	68,743		13.0%
1940	70,662		2.8%
1950	78,508		11.1%
1960	82,723		5.4%
1970	81,926		−1.0%
1980	72,563		−11.4%
1990	70,487		−2.9%
2000	65,358		−7.3%
2010	60,608		−7.3%
2020	58,662		−3.2%
2025 (est.)	58,281		−0.6%

=== Racial and ethnic composition ===
Springfield city, Ohio – Racial and ethnic composition Note: the US Census treats Hispanic/Latino as an ethnic category. This table excludes Latinos from the racial categories and assigns them to a separate category. Hispanics/Latinos may be of any race.
Race / Ethnicity (NH = Non-Hispanic)	Pop 2000	Pop 2010	Pop 2020	% 2000	% 2010	% 2020
White alone (NH)	50,663	44,946	40,107	77.52%	74.16%	68.37%
Black or African American alone (NH)	11,832	10,876	10,913	18.10%	17.94%	18.60%
Native American or Alaska Native alone (NH)	193	167	160	0.30%	0.28%	0.27%
Asian alone (NH)	446	446	472	0.68%	0.74%	0.80%
Native Hawaiian or Pacific Islander alone (NH)	14	21	44	0.02%	0.03%	0.08%
Other Race alone (NH)	138	169	335	0.21%	0.28%	0.57%
Mixed race or Multiracial (NH)	1,302	2,159	3,766	1.99%	3.56%	6.42%
Hispanic or Latino (any race)	770	1,824	2,865	1.18%	3.01%	4.88%
Total	65,358	60,608	58,662	100.00%	100.00%	100.00%

=== 2020 census ===
As of the 2020 census, Springfield had a population of 58,662. The median age was 38.6 years. 23.4% of residents were under the age of 18 and 18.8% of residents were 65 years of age or older. For every 100 females there were 92.0 males, and for every 100 females age 18 and over there were 88.2 males age 18 and over.

99.9% of residents lived in urban areas, while 0.1% lived in rural areas.

There were 24,613 households in Springfield, of which 27.3% had children under the age of 18 living in them. Of all households, 30.2% were married-couple households, 23.0% were households with a male householder and no spouse or partner present, and 36.4% were households with a female householder and no spouse or partner present. About 37.1% of all households were made up of individuals and 16.3% had someone living alone who was 65 years of age or older.

There were 27,689 housing units, of which 11.1% were vacant. The homeowner vacancy rate was 2.4% and the rental vacancy rate was 8.1%.

Racial composition as of the 2020 census
Race	Number	Percent
White	40,766	69.5%
Black or African American	11,006	18.8%
American Indian and Alaska Native	200	0.3%
Asian	475	0.8%
Native Hawaiian and Other Pacific Islander	45	0.1%
Some other race	1,514	2.6%
Two or more races	4,656	7.9%
Hispanic or Latino (of any race)	2,865	4.9%

=== 2010 census ===
As of the 2010 census, there were 60,608 people, 24,459 households, and 14,399 families residing in the city. The population density was 2,693.7 inhabitants per square mile (1,040.0/km^{2}). There were 28,437 housing units at an average density of 1,263.9 per square mile (488.0/km^{2}). The racial makeup of the city was 75.2% White, 18.1% African American, 0.3% Native American, 0.8% Asian, nil% Pacific Islander, and 4.0% from two or more races. Hispanic or Latino of any race were 3.0% of the population.

There were 24,459 households, of which 26.3% had children under the age of 18 living with them, 34.4% were married couples living together, 18.6% had a female householder with no spouse present, 5.9% had a male householder with no spouse present, and 41.1% were non-families. Of all households, 34.1% were made up of individuals, and 13.7% had someone living alone who was 65 years of age or older. The average household size was 2.38, and the average family size was 3.01.

In the population was spread out, with 24.4% under the age of 18, 11.5% from 18 to 24, 24.2% from 25 to 44, 24.6% from 45 to 64, and 15.3% who were 65 years of age or older. The median age was 36 years. For every 100 females, there were 90.9 males. For every 100 females age 18 and over, there were 86.2 males.

=== 2000 census ===
As of the 2000 census, the median income for a household in the city was $32,193, and the median income for a family was $39,890. Males had a median income of $32,027 versus $23,155 for females. The per capita income for the city was $16,660. 16.9% of the population and 13.5% of families were below the poverty line. Out of the total population, 23.9% of those under the age of 18 and 9.6% of those 65 and older were living below the poverty line.

== Economy ==
Springfield has a notably weakened economy due to many factors, but a key cause for degradation of the economy in Springfield has been the decline in manufacturing jobs. Between 1999 and 2014, Springfield saw the median income decrease by 27 percent, compared to just 8 percent across the country. In the 1990s, Springfield lost 22,000 blue collar jobs, which were the backbone of the city economy. Today, Springfield largely relies on healthcare, manufacturing, transportation, leisure, education, financial institutions, and retail for employment.

== Government ==
The current mayor of Springfield is Rob Rue, who was sworn in January 2024. He succeeded Warren Copeland, who had been mayor of the city since 1998.

The City of Springfield operates as a council-manager form of government, with an elected City Commission operating with an appointed City Manager. The Springfield City Commission is composed of the mayor and four city commissioners, all serving four-year terms. Commissioners must be residents of the city both one year prior and during their terms. As of 2026, the commissioners are Chris Wallace, Andy Rigsbee, Larry Ricketts and vice-mayor Tracy Tackett.

== Education ==
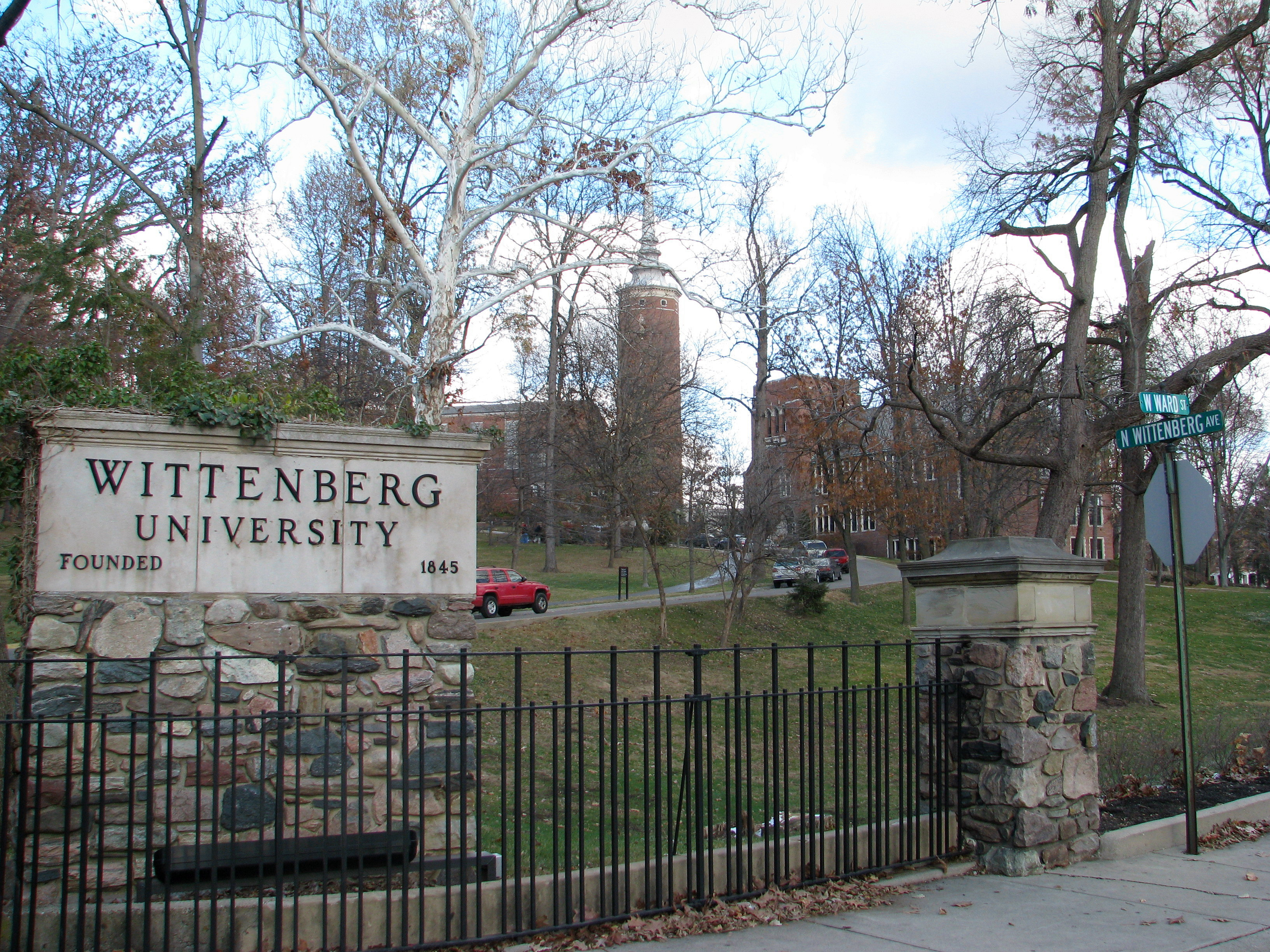
Wittenberg University

Most of Springfield's residents are served by the Springfield City School District, which enrolls about 7,000 students in public elementary and secondary schools. The district operates 14 schools—ten elementary, three middle, and one high school, Springfield High School—and one alternative school.

Other schools in Springfield include the Global Impact STEM Academy, an early-college middle school and high school certified in Science, Technology, Engineering, and Mathematics curriculum founded in 2013.

Parts of northern Springfield are served by in Northeastern Local School District and Northwestern Local School District. Portions to the west, south, and southeast are in Clark-Shawnee Local School District.

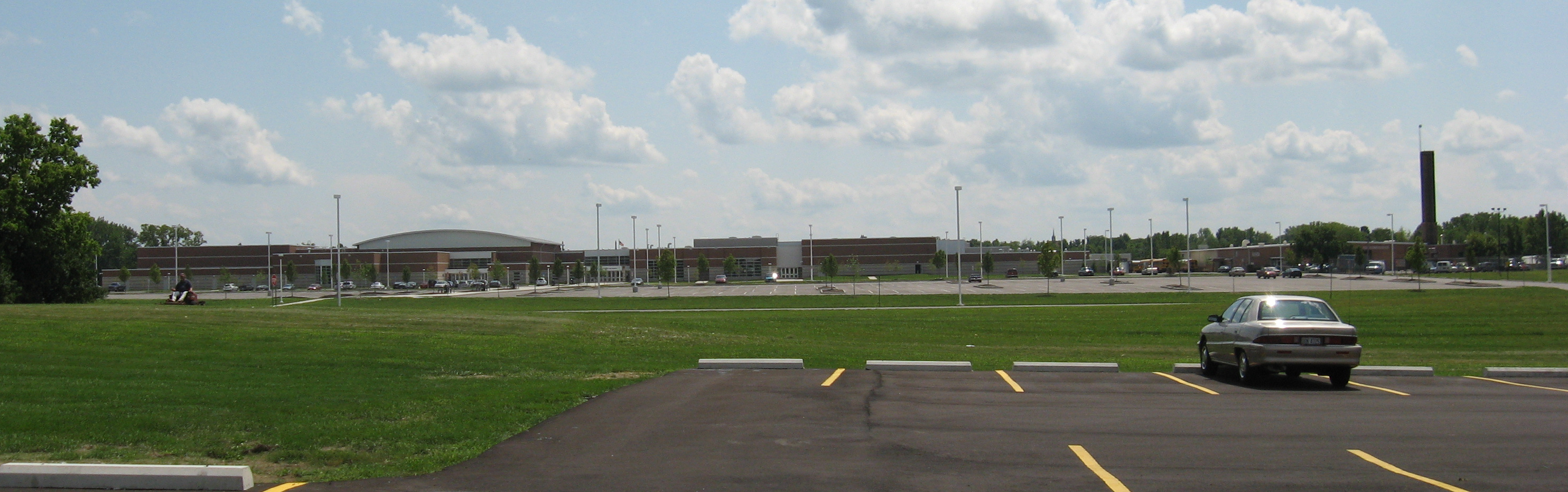
Springfield High School

Wittenberg University is a private liberal arts college founded in Springfield in 1845. Associated with the Evangelical Lutheran Church in America, its student body consists of roughly 1,300 full-time students. The university has a 114-acre campus and offers more than seventy majors. Wittenberg has more than 150 campus organizations, which include ten national fraternities and sororities. The WUSO radio station is operated on the campus.

The city is also home to Clark State College, which offers associate's and bachelor's degrees. The Springfield and Clark County Technical Education Program opened in 1962 and began to offer technical training for residents of Springfield and surrounding communities, and was chartered as the Clark County Technical Institute on February 18, 1966, Ohio's first technical college sanctioned by the Ohio Board of Regents.

The Clark County Public Library operates four public libraries within the city of Springfield.

== Media ==
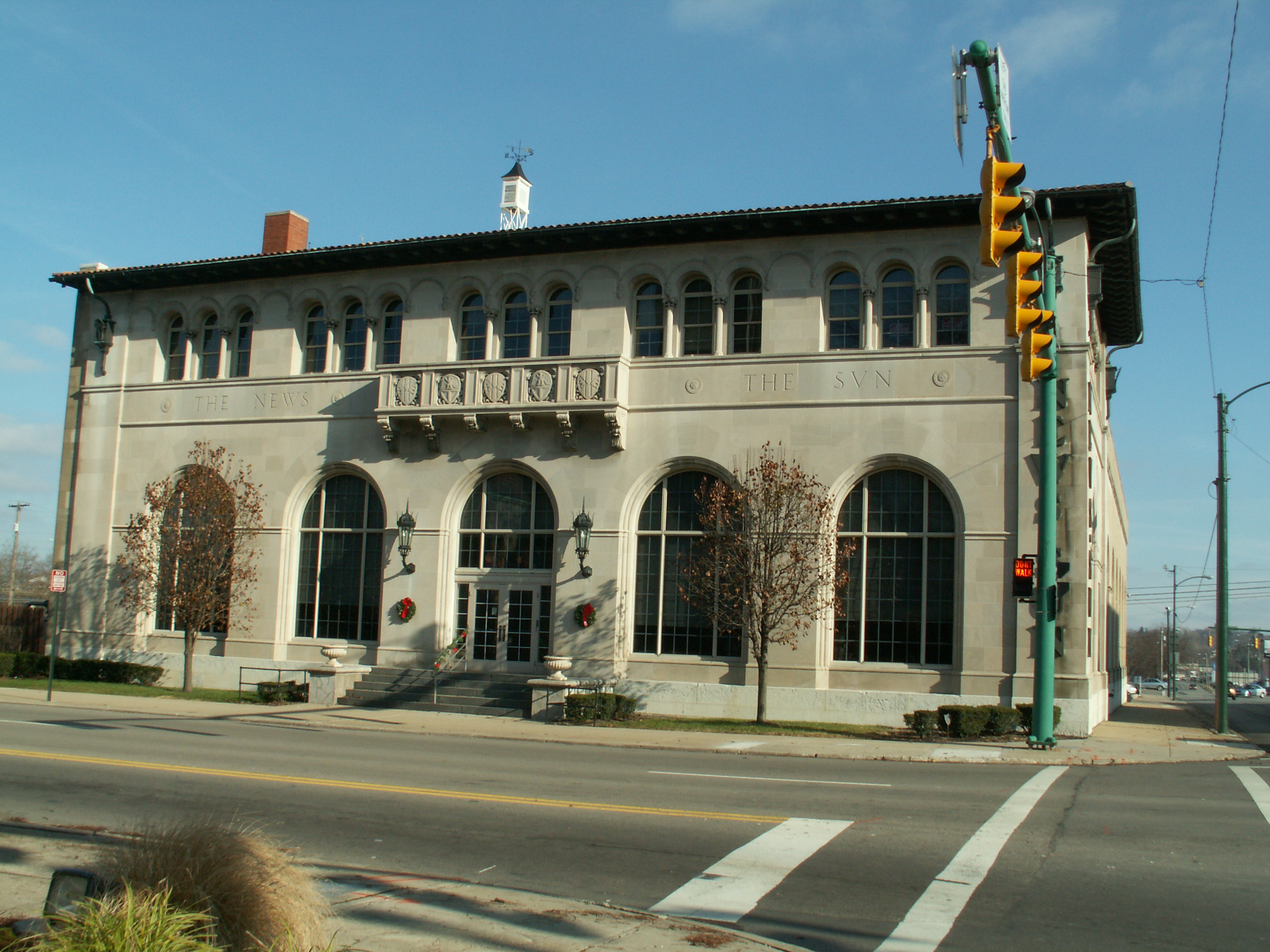
Springfield News-Sun former headquarters

The city is served by one daily newspaper, the Springfield News-Sun. The Wittenberg Torch is the newspaper of Wittenberg University. WEEC-FM radio, featuring Christian-based programming, is located in the city. Two AM radio stations are licensed to Springfield—WIZE 1340, owned by iHeart Media, and WULM 1600, licensed to Radio Maria—but neither is locally operated or programmed. WIZE broadcasts iHeart's Black Information Network; WULM, Catholic programming from KJMJ-AM in Alexandria, Louisiana.

== Infrastructure ==
=== Transportation ===
Ohio State Route 72 runs north–south through downtown Springfield. U.S. Highway 40 runs east–west through the downtown. U.S. Highway 68 runs north–south on the west edge of the city. Interstate 70 runs east–west to the south of the city.

Springfield–Beckley Municipal Airport, a civil-military airport, is located five nautical miles (5.8 mi; 9.3 km) south-southwest of Springfield's central business district. The closest airport with commercial passenger flights is Dayton International Airport, 27.2 miles to the west.

Springfield was once served by passenger railroads: the New York Central at its Big Four Depot, with trains for Cincinnati, Detroit, Cleveland and New York City, demolished in 1969; and the Pennsylvania Railroad at its station, with trains for Richmond, Indiana, and Chicago. The last train from Springfield left on April 30, 1971: an unnamed remnant of the New York Central's Ohio State Limited, run by Penn Central on the Cincinnati–Columbus–Cleveland route.

== Notable people ==
The following are notable people born and/or raised in Springfield:

- Berenice Abbott, photographer
- Randy Ayers, head coach of Ohio State men's basketball and the Philadelphia 76ers
- Minnie Willis Baines Miller, author
- Leslie Greene Bowman, president of the Thomas Jefferson Foundation
- Bobby Bowsher, racing driver
- J. T. Brubaker, baseball player
- Edward Lyon Buchwalter, first president of the Citizens National Bank of Springfield; U.S. Civil War captain
- Dave Burba, professional baseball player
- William R. Burnett, novelist and screenwriter
- Ron Burton, professional football player
- Garvin Bushell, musician
- Butch Carter, NBA player and coach
- Justin Chambers, actor (Alex Karev, Grey's Anatomy) and former model
- Bobby Clark, comedy actor
- Jia Cobb, federal judge
- Call Cobbs, Jr., jazz pianist
- Jason Collier, professional basketball player
- Trey DePriest, linebacker of the Baltimore Ravens, 2-time NCAA National Champion with the Alabama Crimson Tide football team
- Mike DeWine, 70th Governor of Ohio
- Marsha Dietlein, actress
- Joe Dunn, major league baseball player and manager for the Springfield Dunnmen and Springfield Reapers.
- Adam Eaton, professional baseball player
- Nathan Ebner - professional football player for New England Patriots
- Wayne Embry, professional basketball player
- Dorothy Gish, actress from the silent film era and after; younger sister of Lillian
- Lillian Gish, actress from the silent film era and after
- Luther Alexander Gotwald, tried for and acquitted of Lutheran heresy at Wittenberg College in 1893
- Albert Belmont Graham, founder of 4-H
- Anais Granofsky, actress, screenwriter, producer and director
- Harvey Haddix, professional baseball player
- Robert C. Henry, first African American mayor in Ohio
- Dustin Hermanson, professional baseball player
- Dave Hobson, U.S. Congressman for Ohio's Seventh District
- Alice Hohlmayer, All-American Girls Professional Baseball League player
- Griffin House, singer-songwriter
- Mary Vance Humphrey, writer, clubwoman
- Quentin Jackson, jazz trombonist
- Jimmy Journell, professional baseball player
- Taito Kantonen, academic and theologian
- J. Warren Keifer, Civil War general and Speaker of the House
- Bradley Kincaid, America's first country music star
- David Ward King, inventor of the King road drag
- Brooks Lawrence, professional baseball player
- John Legend, singer, musician, R&B and neo-soul pianist
- Lois Lenski, author and illustrator of children's fiction, including Strawberry Girl
- Deborah Loewer, U.S. Navy admiral
- Johnny Lytle, jazz musician
- John Mahoney, Ohio state senator
- Will McEnaney, professional baseball player, pitcher for the Cincinnati Reds
- Jeff Meckstroth, multiple world champion bridge player
- Braxton Miller, Ohio State quarterback and NFL player
- Davey Moore, boxer, World Featherweight Title holder 1959–1963
- Henrietta G. Moore, Universalist minister, educator, temperance activist; president, Equal Suffrage Club of Springfield, Ohio
- Randolph Moss, federal judge
- William Warder Norton, publisher
- Troy Perkins, professional soccer player
- Scott Peters, U.S. representative for California
- Carl Ferdinand Pfeifer, presidential aide
- Coles Phillips, early 20th-century illustrator, inventor of the "fade-away" girl
- Robert Bruce Raup, professor, Teachers College, Columbia University, writer, and critic of American Education system
- Alaina Reed Hall, television actress, 227 and Sesame Street
- William Ridenour, member of the West Virginia House of Delegates
- Tate Robertson, soccer player
- Barbara Schantz, police officer, gained national attention for Playboy pictorial, and subject of the 1983 movie Policewoman Centerfold
- Cecil Scott, jazz clarinetist, tenor saxophonist, and bandleader
- Dick Shatto, professional Canadian football player
- Winant Sidle, U.S. Army major general
- Elle Smith, model, journalist, and Miss USA 2021
- J. Elmer Spyglass - singer and employee of the Consulate General of the United States, Frankfurt
- James Garfield Stewart, Supreme Court of Ohio's 109th justice
- Dann Stupp, author
- Charles Thompson, jazz musician
- Tommy Tucker (a.k.a. Robert Higginbotham), jazz musician
- Chris Via, professional bowler on the PBA Tour, winner of the 2021 U.S. Open
- Crista Nicole Wagner, Playboy Playmate (May 2001) and Miss Hawaiian Tropic (2001)
- Helen Bosart Morgan Wagstaff, artist
- James R. Ward, World War II Medal of Honor recipient
- Benjamin H. Warder, manufacturer of agricultural machinery
- Earle Warren, jazz saxophonist with Count Basie
- Walter L. Weaver, U.S. Representative from Ohio
- Rick White, professional baseball player
- Worthington Whittredge, Hudson River School painter
- Jonathan Winters, actor and comedian

== Gallery ==
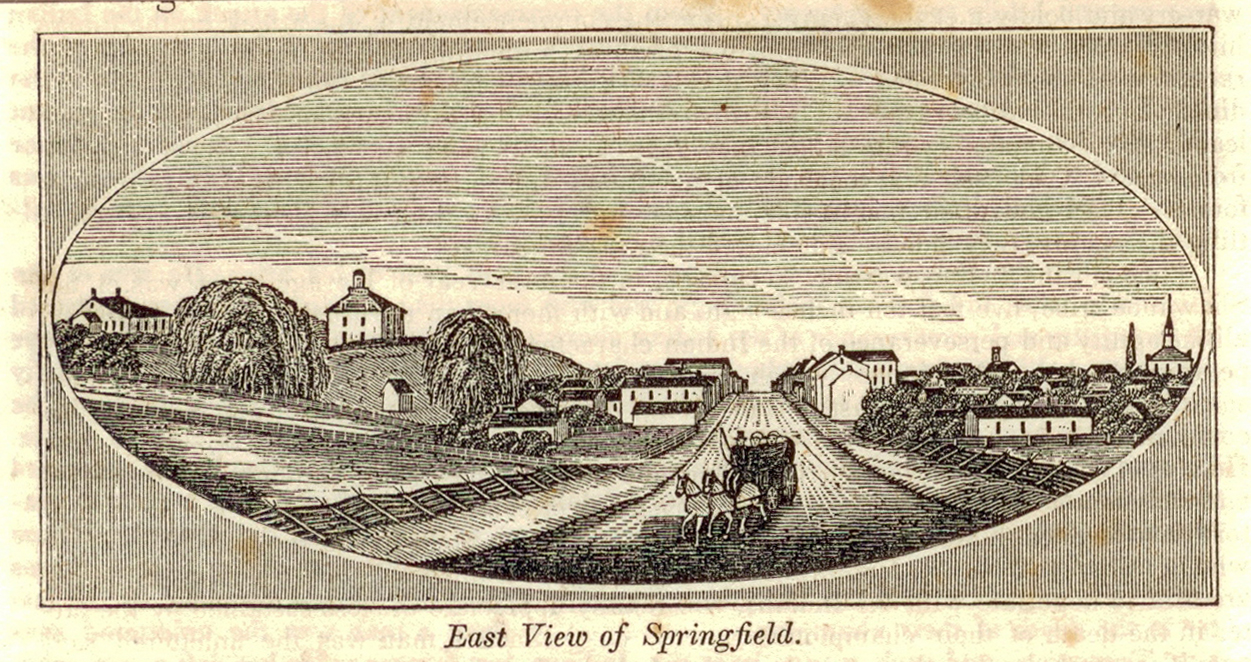
Springfield around 1830

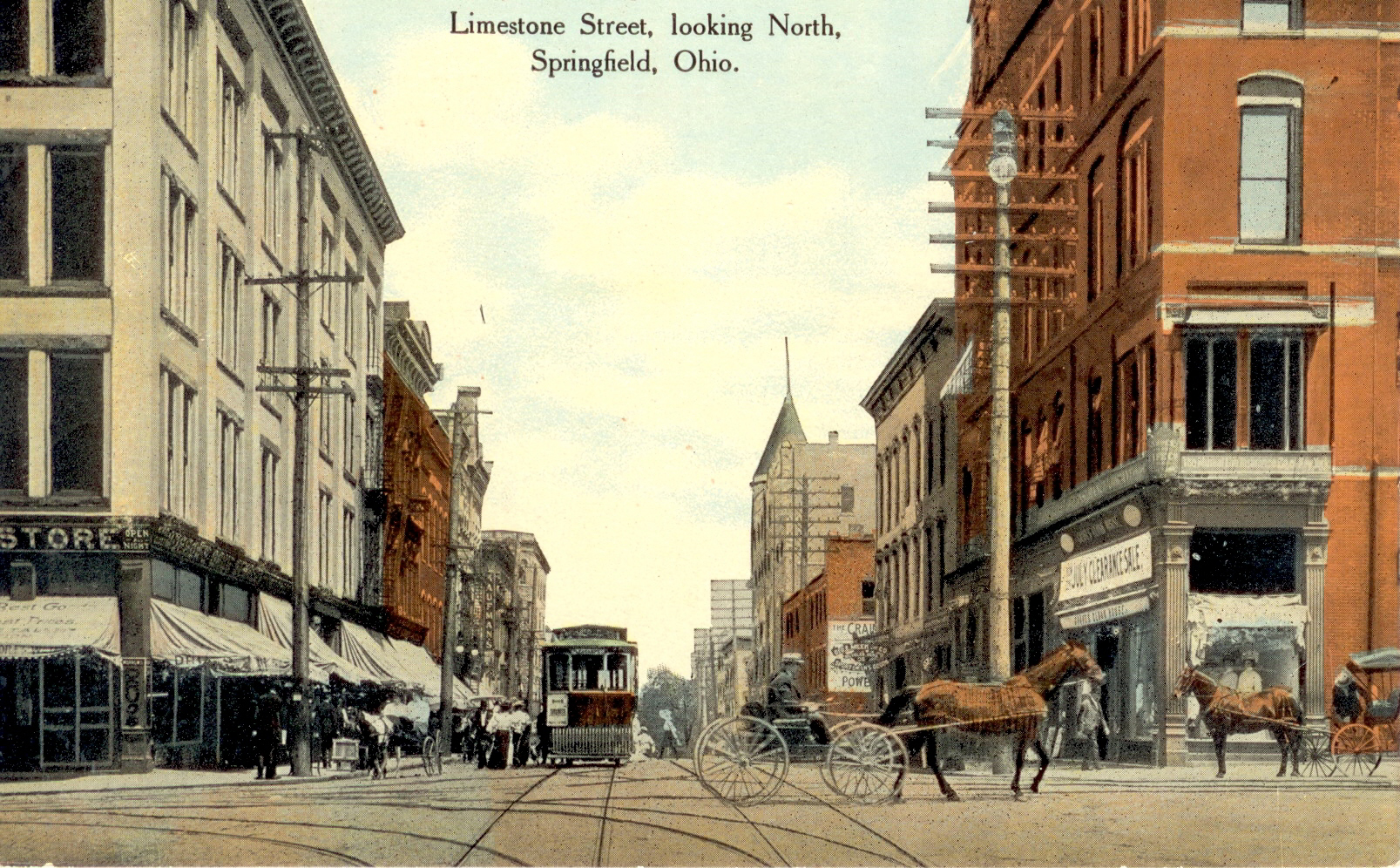
Springfield around 1900

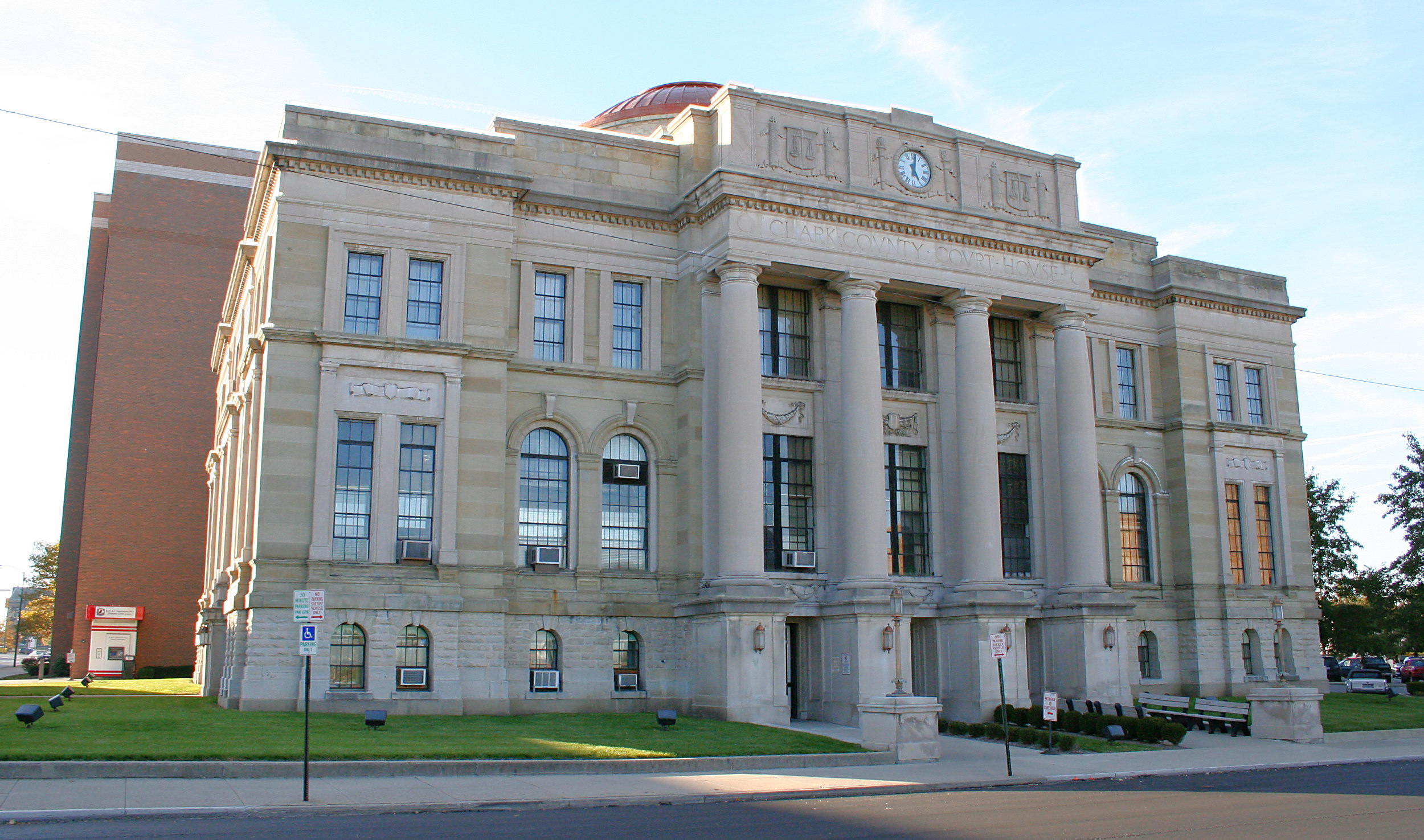
Clark County Courthouse in downtown Springfield

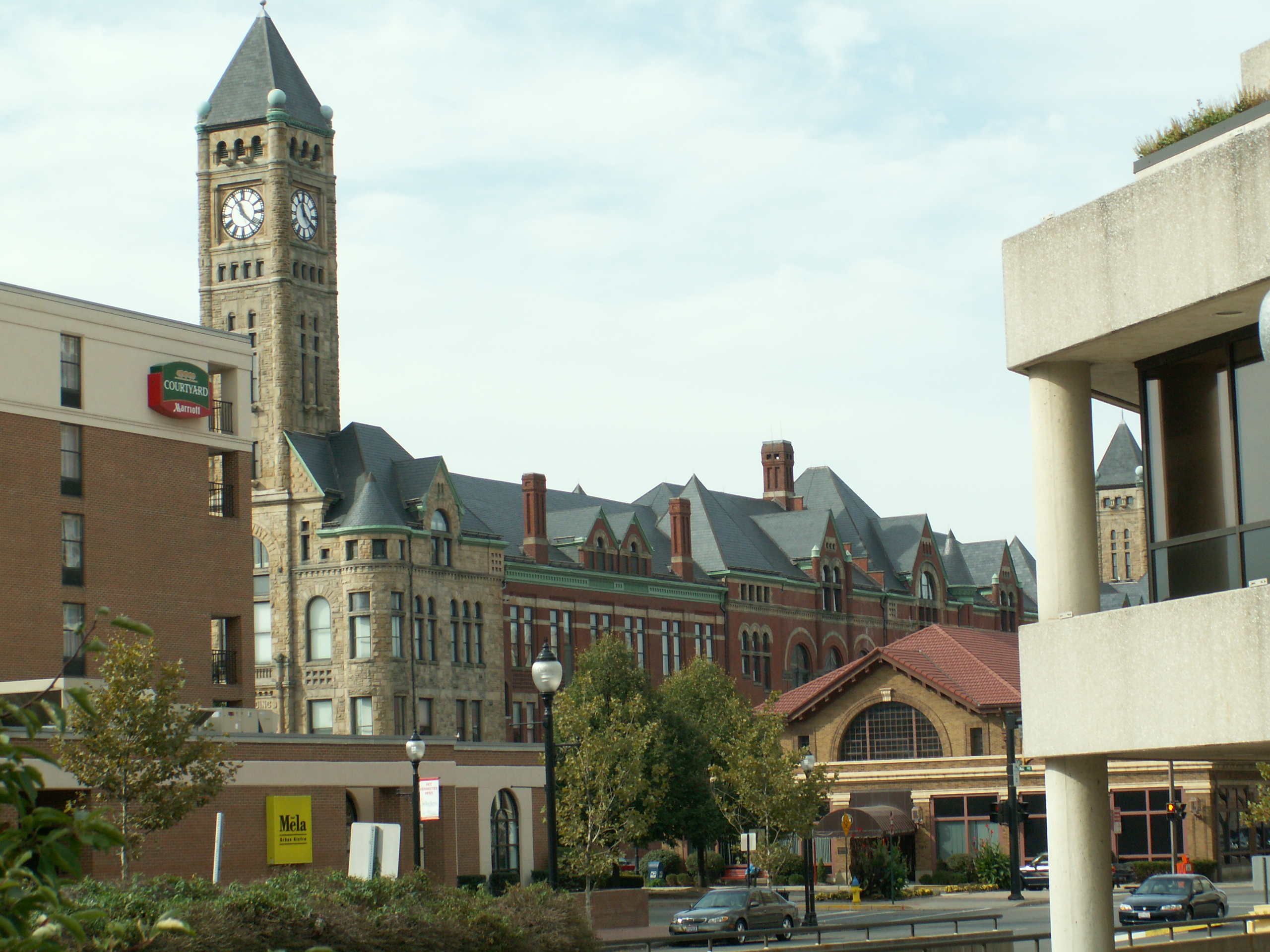
Old City Hall, now the Clark County Heritage Center

== See also ==
- Clark County Heritage Center, which houses the Clark County Historical Society museum, library, and archives.
