= Springfield City Hall (Ohio) =

Coordinates: 39°55′25″N 83°48′35″W

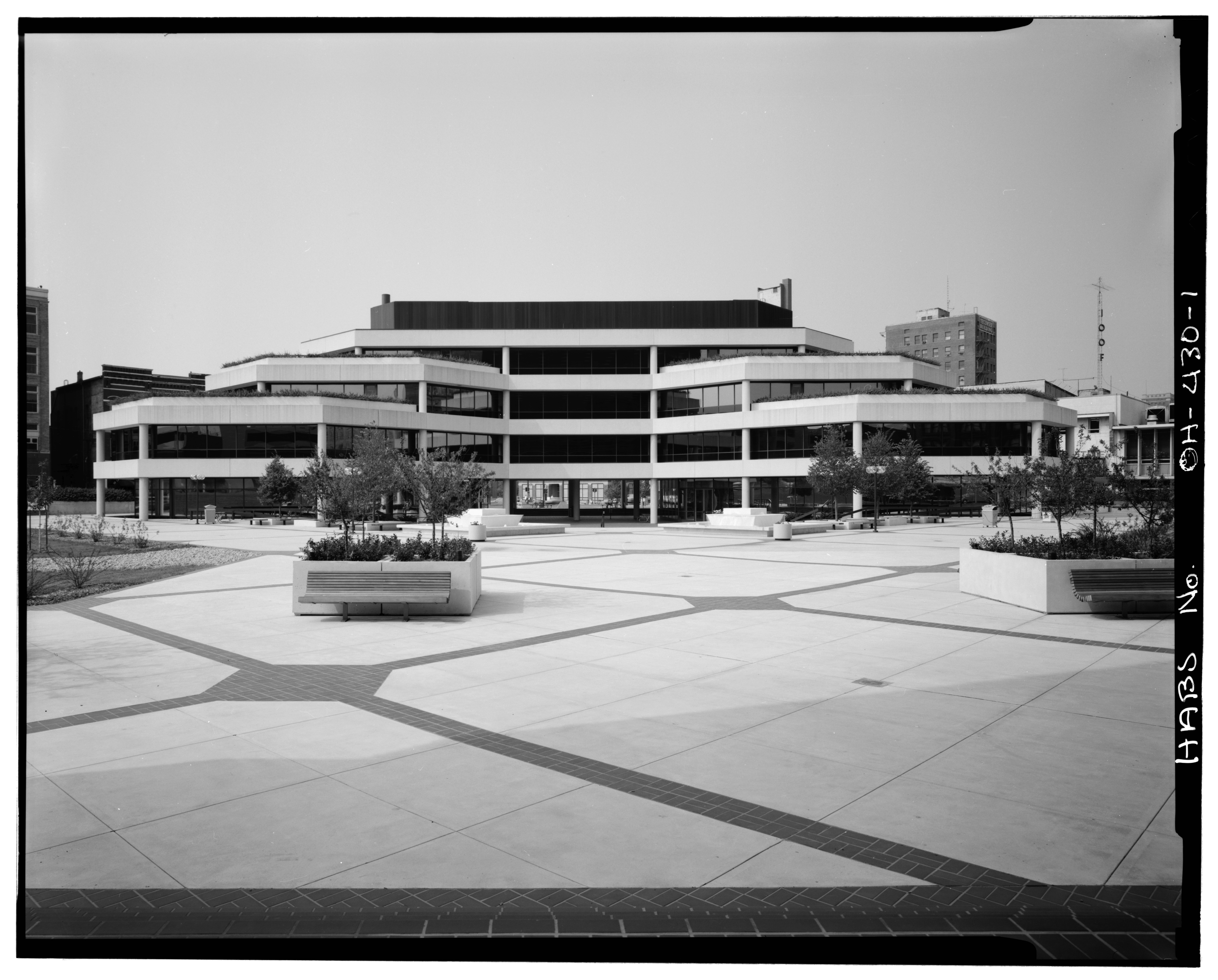
- South elevation, photographed in 1981 for the Historic American Buildings Survey

General information
- Location: 76 East High Street, Springfield, Ohio
- Completed: 1979

Design and construction
- Architect: SOM_(architectural_firm)

Springfield City Hall is the city hall of Springfield, Ohio. Built in 1979, it was designed by Skidmore, Owings & Merrill. The city hall offices were previously located in a building now used as the Clark County Heritage Center.

== Oracle's Vision ==
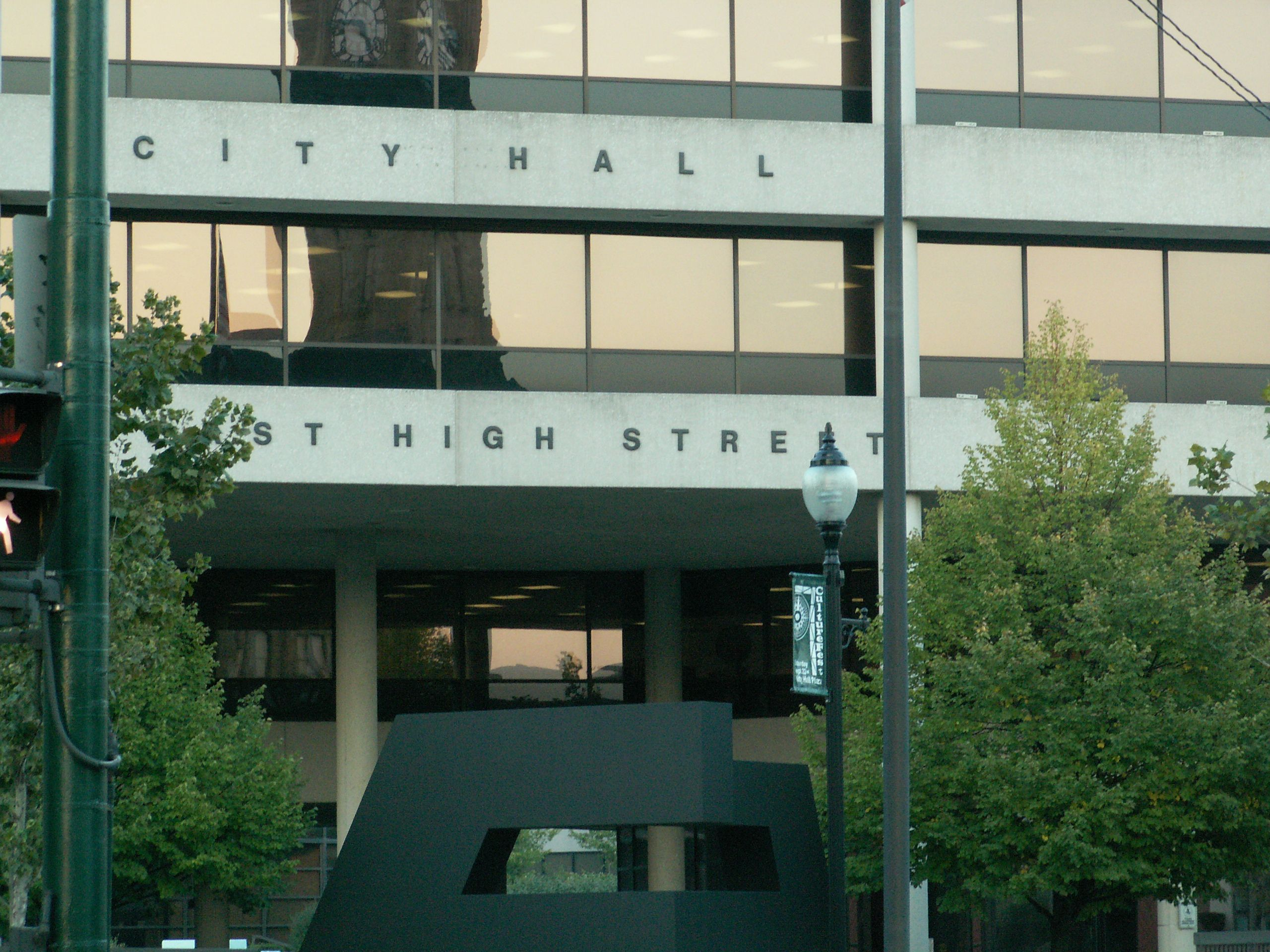
Oracle's Vision before removal

In 1981, soon after construction was completed, a minimalist sculpture by Ronald Bladen was installed outside the entrance of the city hall. Titled Oracle's Vision, the work was primarily funded by the National Endowment for the Arts and the city of Springfield, with additional funding coming from donors. Efforts were made to remove the sculpture in 1982, and after Bladen's death in 1988. The sculpture was placed in storage in 2023, as part of a city hall plaza renovation.

== See also ==
- List of mayors of Springfield, Ohio
