= List of Wittenberg University alumni =

Following is a list of notable Wittenberg University alumni.

== Art and architecture ==
- George Izenour (BA, 1934; MA 1936), theatre designer, author, and educator
- Ronald Fook Shiu Li, founder of the Hong Kong Stock Exchange
- William C. Martin, founder, Bank of Ann Arbor; founder, First Martin Corp.; former president of the United States Olympic Committee, University of Michigan athletic director
- Matthew Shay, president and CEO of the National Retail Federation
- Jennifer Vanderpool, visual artist
- Adam Willis Wagnalls, Funk & Wagnalls Company co-founder
- Helen Bosart Morgan Wagstaff, artist, first president of the Springfield Art Association

== Clergy ==
- Lloyd C. Douglas, minister and author
- Robert J. Marshall, president of the Lutheran Church of America
- ZeBarney Thorne Phillips, chaplain of the U.S. Senate, 1927–1942

== Education ==
- Mark A. Boyer, Ph.D. 1988, professor of Political Science, University of Connecticut
- Barry Burden, Ph.D. 1998, professor of political science, University of Wisconsin-Madison
- Jonathan Howes (bachelor's degree 1959), director of the Center for Urban and Regional Studies at the University of North Carolina at Chapel Hill and mayor of Chapel Hill, North Carolina
- George Philip Krapp, professor of English at Columbia University
- John Warwick Montgomery, Distinguished Research Professor of Philosophy at Concordia University, lawyer, theologian (M.Div., 1958)
- Robert Bruce Raup, philosopher, writer, professor in the Philosophy of Education, Teachers College, Columbia University
- Karl Weick, organizational theorist at the University of Michigan

== Entertainment ==
- John Chowning, musician, inventor, and professor
- Lauren Schmidt Hissrich, television writer
- Thomas Hyland, professional blackjack player, Blackjack Hall of Fame inductee
- Pierre Lhomme, French cinematographer
- James Rebhorn, actor
- Barbara Shearer, pianist

== Government and civil service ==
- Fritz W. Ermarth, director of National Security Programs at the Nixon Center
- Robert C. Henry, first African-American mayor in Ohio
- Douglas E. Lumpkin, director of the Ohio Department of Job and Family Services
- John E. McLaughlin, deputy director of the Central Intelligence Agency, senior fellow at the Paul H. Nitze School of Advanced International Studies and Brookings Institution

== Law ==
- Gregory L. Frost, United States federal judge
- Peter S. Grosscup, judge, U.S. Seventh Circuit Court of Appeals, 1899–1911
- James G. Johnson, justice of the Supreme Court of Ohio
- Mary Miller Johnston, judge, Superior Court of Delaware, 2003-2024
- A. John Pelander, justice of the Arizona Supreme Court
- Augustus N. Summers, justice of the Ohio Supreme Court, 1904–1911
- Shelice Tolbert, attorney in Indiana
- Charles B. Zimmerman, associate justice of the Ohio Supreme Court, 1933 and 1934–1949

== Military ==
- James M. Bell (1837–1919), U.S. Army brigadier general
- Benjamin Thurman Hacker (1935–2003), U.S. Navy officer, first Naval flight officer to achieve flag rank
- Edward Vollrath (attended 1879–1881), U.S. Army brigadier general

== Nonprofits ==
- Sandra Postel, founder and director of the Global Water Policy Project, environmentalist and author.
- Jere Ratcliffe, chief scout executive of Boy Scouts of America, from 1993 to 2000.
- William Anderson, Vice President, Presbyterian Children's Services

== Politics ==
- Jennette Bradley, former lieutenant governor of Ohio and Ohio state treasurer
- Albert Bryan, governor of the United States Virgin Islands
- Jonathan Howes (bachelor's degree 1959), mayor of Chapel Hill, North Carolina and director of the Center for Urban and Regional Studies at the University of North Carolina at Chapel Hill
- Marietje Schaake, former member of the European Parliament and international policy director at Stanford University
- Thomas D. Shepard, Los Angeles City Council member, 1961–67
- Sheila Simon, lieutenant governor of Illinois
- Walter L. Weaver, U.S. representative from Ohio

== Sports ==
- Brian Agler, basketball coach, formerly the head coach of WNBA's Seattle Storm and Los Angeles Sparks; Wittenberg's athletic director
- Al Davis, owner of the Oakland Raiders NFL franchise, attended Wittenberg University but graduated from Syracuse University 1950
- Sandy Dukat, athlete
- Mark Henninger, football coach
- Taver Johnson, football coach
- Ron Lancaster, 4-time Grey Cup-winning CFL quarterback and coach, member of the Canadian Football Hall of Fame
- William C. Martin, University of Michigan athletic director, 2000–2009; founder, Bank of Ann Arbor; founder, First Martin Corp.; former president of the United States Olympic Committee
- Eldon Miller, former men's college basketball coach at Wittenberg University, Western Michigan University, Ohio State University, and the University of Northern Iowa
- Andy Waddle, Wittenberg football secondary coach 2005; Wittenberg football defensive coordinator 2006–2012; Marietta College football head coach 2013–2024; Valparaiso University football head coach 2025–present

== Science and medicine ==
- Paul Dressel (B.A. 1931), educational psychologist
- David W. Hertzog, scientist
- Elwood V. Jensen, scientist
- David Ward King, inventor of the King road drag
- James Marcia, psychologist of identity development
- Waldo Nelson, pediatrician and author of the Nelson Textbook of Pediatrics
- Hugh M. Raup, botanist and ecologist

== Writing and journalism ==
- Sherwood Anderson, writer
- Isaac Kaufmann Funk, editor, lexicographer, publisher; founder of Funk & Wagnalls Company publishing firm
- Minnie Willis Baines Miller (A.M.), author
- Brandy Schillace, writer
