= GWPP =

The initials GWPP could indicate:

- the Global Water Policy Project, a fresh-water conservation project headed by Sandra Postel.
- the Global Warming Petition Project (AKA the Oregon Petition), a project devoted to discrediting global climate change (or its previous label global warming), under the auspices of the non-profit organization called the Oregon Institute of Science and Medicine.
