= Brandy Schillace =

American author, historian, and television host

Brandy Lain Schillace (born 1977) is an American author, historian, and television host. She is the author of the books Death's Summer Coat (2016), Mr Humble & Doctor Butcher (2021), The Intermediaries (2025), and a series of cozy mystery novels about autistic amateur detective Jo Jones that began with The Framed Women of Ardemore House (2024) and The Dead Come to Stay (2025).

== Early life and education ==
Schillace was born in 1977, in Akron, and largely grew up in an underground house near an abandoned coal mine in Coshocton County. She earned an English degree from Wittenberg University and later a doctorate in English from Case Western Reserve University.

== Writing ==
Schillace's first book, Death's Summer Coat (2016) was a survey of world grief and funeral rituals. Kirkus Reviews praised it as a "surprisingly easy reading on a usually dark topic".

In 2021, Schillace's biography of surgical pioneer Robert J. White, who conducted experiments to transplant human heads, Mr. Humble and Dr. Butcher, was published. It was praised by The New York Times for being "delightfully macabre" with Publishers Weekly concluding, "Schillace explains the medical nuances of White's surgeries without too much gruesome detail, and her lyrical prose and psychological insights keep the pages turning".

Her debut novel, The Framed Women of Ardemore House (2024), was highlighted as among recent publications that "push back against old stereotypes about life on the spectrum" in The Washington Post.

== Personal life ==
Schillace is autistic, and non-binary. She lives in Cleveland.

== Bibliography ==
- Death's Summer Coat. Pegasus. 2016. ISBN 978-1-681-77324-7.
- Clockwork Futures: The Science of Steampunk and the Reinvention of the Modern World. Pegasus. 2017. ISBN 978-1-681-77518-0.
- Mr. Humble and Dr. Butcher: A Monkey's Head, the Pope's Neuroscientist, and the Quest to Transplant the Soul. Simon & Schuster. 2021. ISBN 978-1-982-11377-3.
- The Framed Women of Ardemore House. Hanover Square. 2024. ISBN 978-1-335-01403-0.
- The Dead Come to Stay. Hanover Square. 2025. ISBN 978-1-335-12187-5.
- The Intermediaries: A Weimar Story. W. W. Norton. 2025. ISBN 978-1-324-03631-9.
