= King road drag =

David Ward King, inventor of the King road drag

Contemporary drawing of the King road drag

Road drag patent

The King road drag (also known as the Missouri road drag and the split log road drag) was a simple form of a road grader implemented for grading dirt road. It revolutionized the maintenance of dirt roads in the early 1900s. It was invented by David Ward King, who went by "D. Ward King" and who was a farmer in Holt Township, near Maitland, Missouri.

It started out as two parallel logs with the cut side facing the front separated three feet by rigid separators and pulled by a team of two horses. Variations of the two-plank drag design, but pulled by trucks or tractors, are still used today to smooth the dirt infields of baseball diamonds.

In this simple design, the first log would remove clods and the second log would smooth the road. The logs were staggered so that dirt would be pushed to the center to create a crown so that water would rush off.

The very simple design replaced the old practice of dragging a road with a single log which left the surface unrepaired and rut-filled. It also made it possible for farmers to improve roads near their homes without having to wait for government graders.

D. Ward King of Maitland, Missouri requested a patent for the process in 1907 and received Patent 884,497 in 1908. He widely publicized the process in a U.S. Department of Agriculture Farmers' Bulletin #321 in 1908 under the title The use of the split-log drag on earth roads. One component of the grading process was that it had to occur when the road was wet.

This invention was the horse-drawn forerunner of the modern-day road grader. It was a sensation in its day. States passed laws requiring its use. The design was so simple that King did not enforce his patent rights. However, he did tour the country explaining to how to use it. He also wrote articles such as one that appeared in the May 7, 1910 issue of the Saturday Evening Post entitled “Good Roads Without Money”.

King further enhanced his invention with his patent 1,102,671 in 1914 which included four bars and two triangular scrapers.

Before the King road drag, dirt roads turned into a quagmire when they were wet, especially in the winter.

The widespread use of the King road drag came during the Good Roads Movement, driven by bicyclists and later by automobile drivers. Automobiles benefitted, since macadam roads were rapidly destabilized by cars, which sucked the cementing dust out of smooth macadam roads. Solid roads meant people could use their automobiles on the roads between cities. Solid rural roads also made possible reliable rural mail delivery, which did much to promote commerce in the United States between city-based businesses and the rural population. For instance, they allowed Sears, Roebuck to start sending out its catalogs to small towns and farms, and thereby vastly increased the size of its customer base.
