= David Ward King =

American inventor (1857–1920)

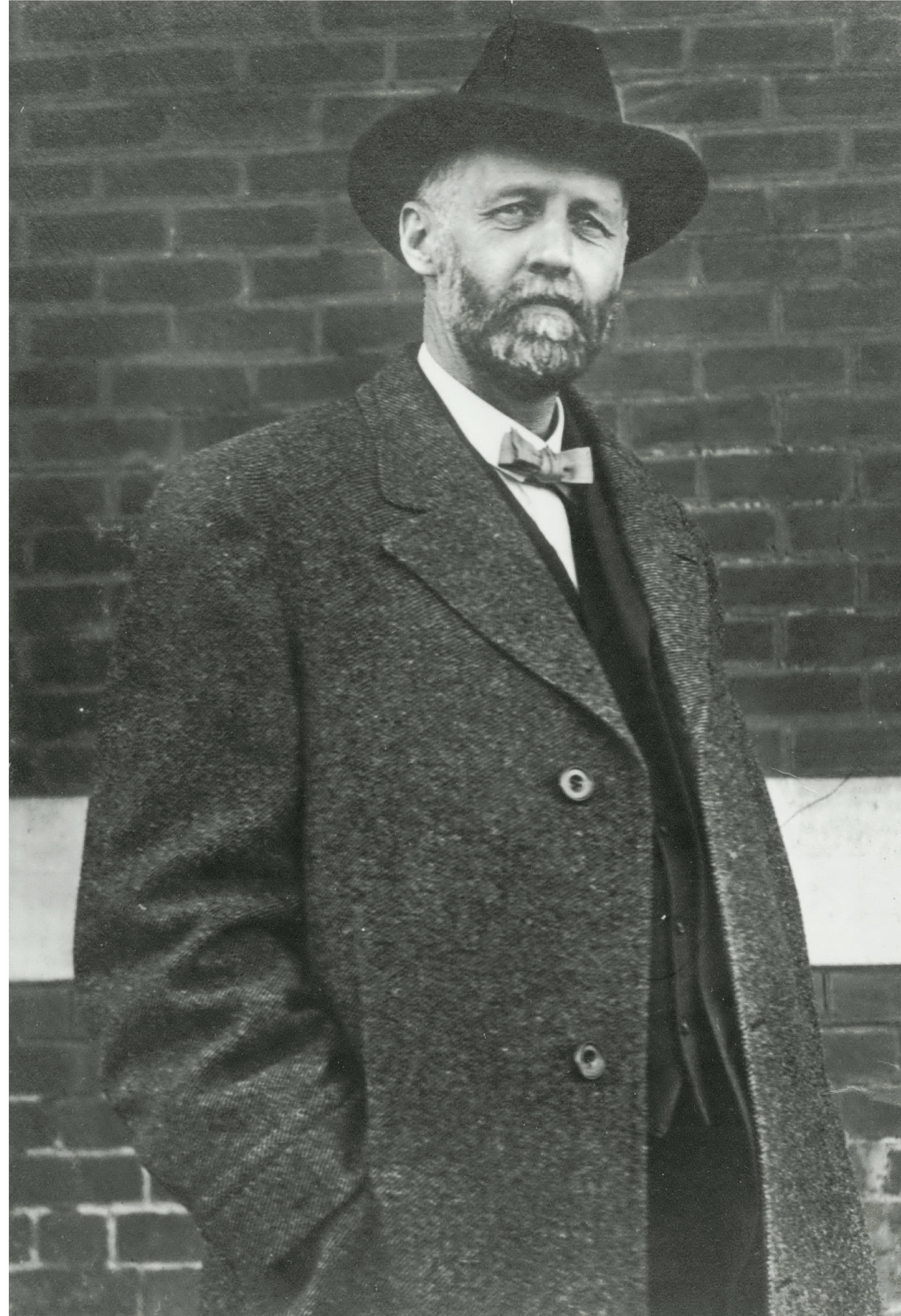
- Born: October 27, 1857; Springfield, Ohio
- Died: February 9, 1920 (aged 62)
- Spouse: Mary Willie Burbank
- Engineering career
- Significant design: King Road Drag

David Ward King (October 27, 1857 – February 9, 1920) was an American farmer and inventor of the King road drag. His invention, which was the horse-drawn forerunner of the modern road grader, influenced American life by improving the widespread dirt roads of his day to the extent that they could accommodate the advent of the automobile, rural mail delivery and mail order catalogues.

== Family and early life ==
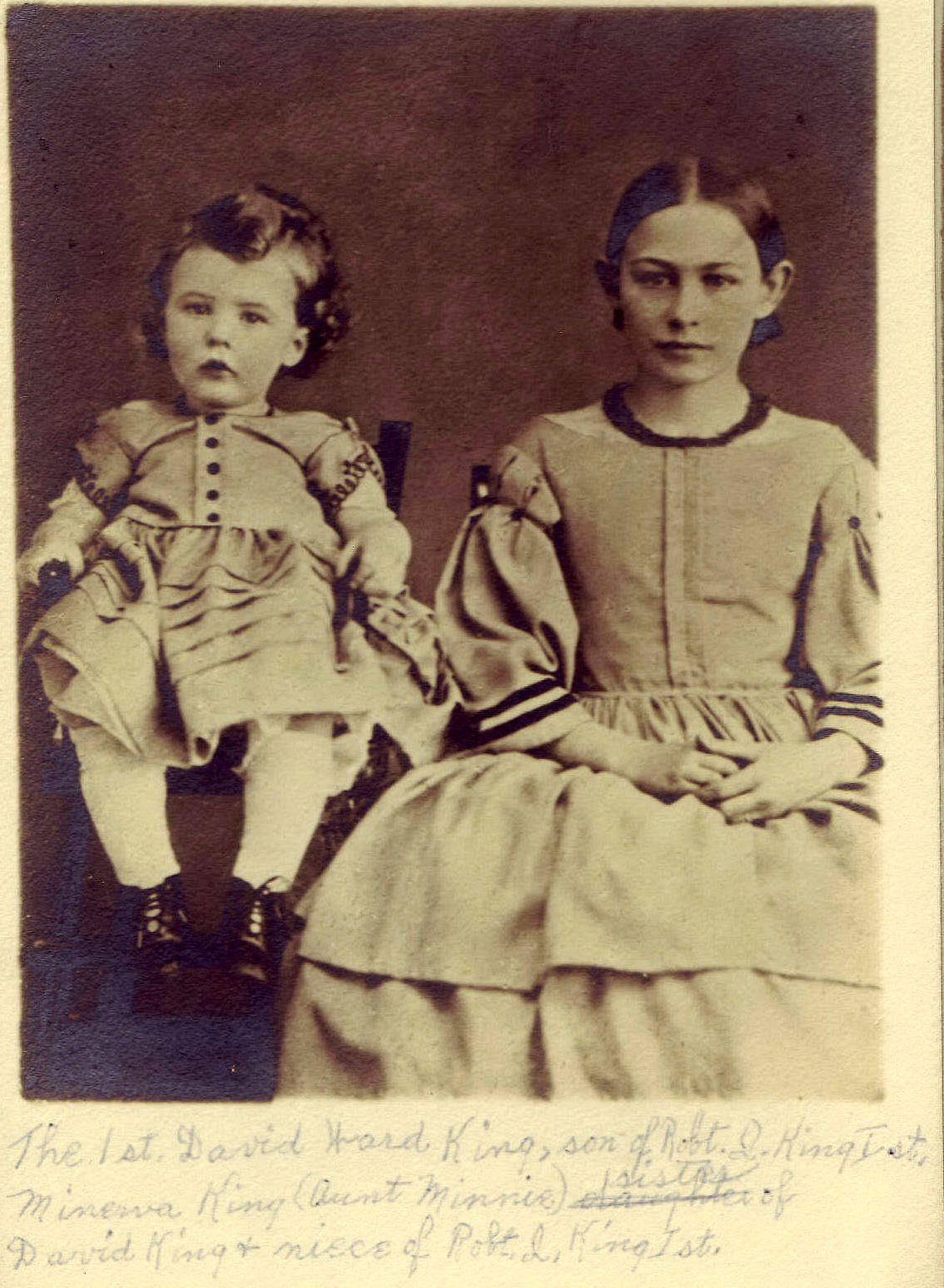
D. Ward King with his Aunt Almena "Minnie" King, Springfield, O. c. 1859

King is and was often referred to as "the Missouri farmer", which he was. However, he was born, reared and educated in Springfield, Ohio, and came from a very prominent and wealthy family of that city.

David Ward King was the grandson of his namesake, Springfield merchant and real estate developer David King. His paternal grandfather, David King, was probably born in Baltimore, Maryland, in 1796. His paternal grandmother, Almena Caldwell King, was born in Hillsborough, New Hampshire, on August 16, 1809. However, she moved with her parents when she was young to early Portsmouth, Ohio, which is in southernmost Ohio at the confluence of the Scioto River and the Ohio River, where her father established a successful carpentry business. Both of Ward's paternal grandparents had been orphans. Ward's grandfather, David King, was found as a toddler wandering the streets of Baltimore during a yellow fever epidemic in which both his parents presumably died. David knew only his own name and could tell nothing about his parents. He was found in a Baltimore hotel and taken in by a Robert Quigley who had a farm near Shippensburg, Pennsylvania, and who had "wagoned" to Baltimore for supplies. While Robert Quigley did rear and educate David King on his Cumberland County, Pennsylvania, farm, he did not adopt him, which is why David's last name stayed King. The Quigleys were devout members of the nearby Middle Spring Presbyterian Church. David King grew up, regularly attending that church, which began a strong tradition of religious correctness in the King family that beyond question made its way down to Ward.

Upon attaining adulthood, Ward's grandfather David King obtained an apprenticeship as a store clerk in Portsmouth, Ohio, where he met Ward's grandmother, then-teenage Almena Caldwell. However, her older brother and father fell from a small boat and drowned in the nearby Scioto River. Soon thereafter, Almena's mother died of grief. Her Uncle Hannibal Gilman Hamlin (first cousin to Lincoln's first Vice President, Hannibal Hamlin) became the guardian of her and her brother, Hamlin Caldwell, moved them to Cincinnati and saw to their education. David King married her there when she was seventeen.

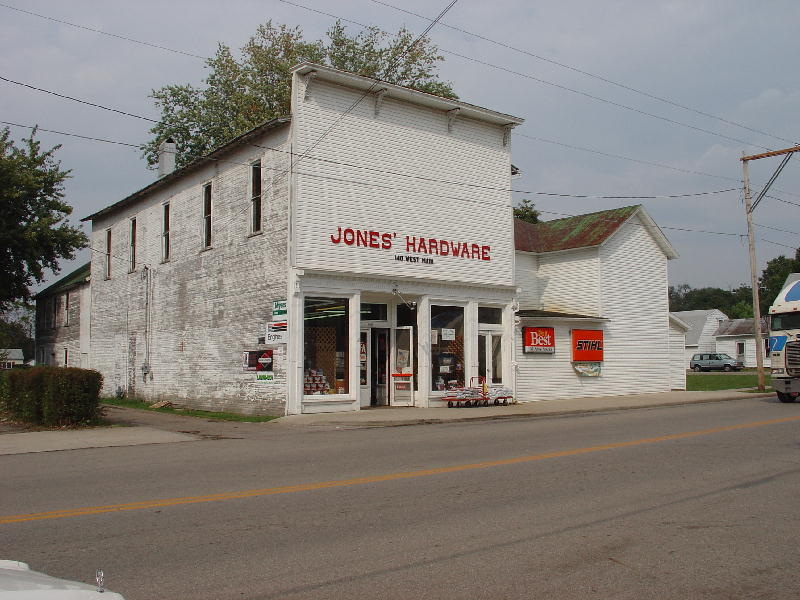
David King's Tarlton store today.

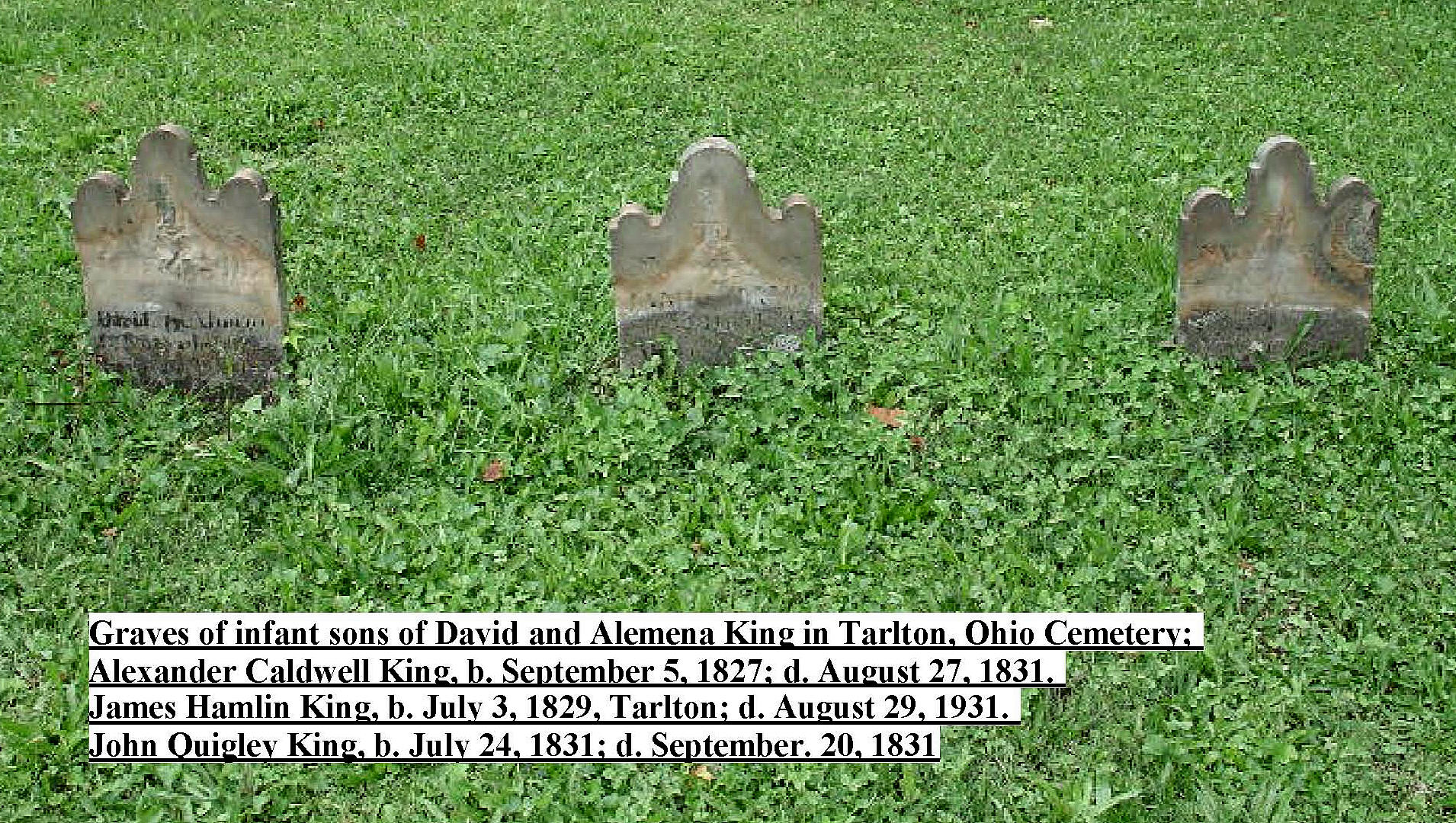
Tarlton Cemetery King children graves

After their marriage, David and Almena soon moved to Tarlton, Ohio, where David put his store clerking experience to good use by opening a general store. Tarlton was on Zane's Trace, which at the time started at the Ohio River across from Wheeling, West Virginia, and passed through Zanesville, Lancaster, the intermittent state capital of Chillicothe and ended at the Ohio River in their previous home town of Portsmouth. The store prospered and David started investing in real estate, which built their wealth substantially over their years in Tarlton.

All did not go well for David and Almena, however. As David often did, he took his wagon "across the mountains" to Baltimore to get supplies for his store—a trip that would take him a month every time he did it. While he was away for his trip in the late summer of 1831, he left Almena in Tarlton with their infant children, as he always had until then. Tragically, their three young sons, Alexander Caldwell King, born September 5, 1827, James Hamlin King, born July 3, 1829, and John Quigley King, born July 24, 1831, all died of smallpox within weeks of each other on August 27, August 28 and September 20, 1831. Almena had to deal with this catastrophe alone.

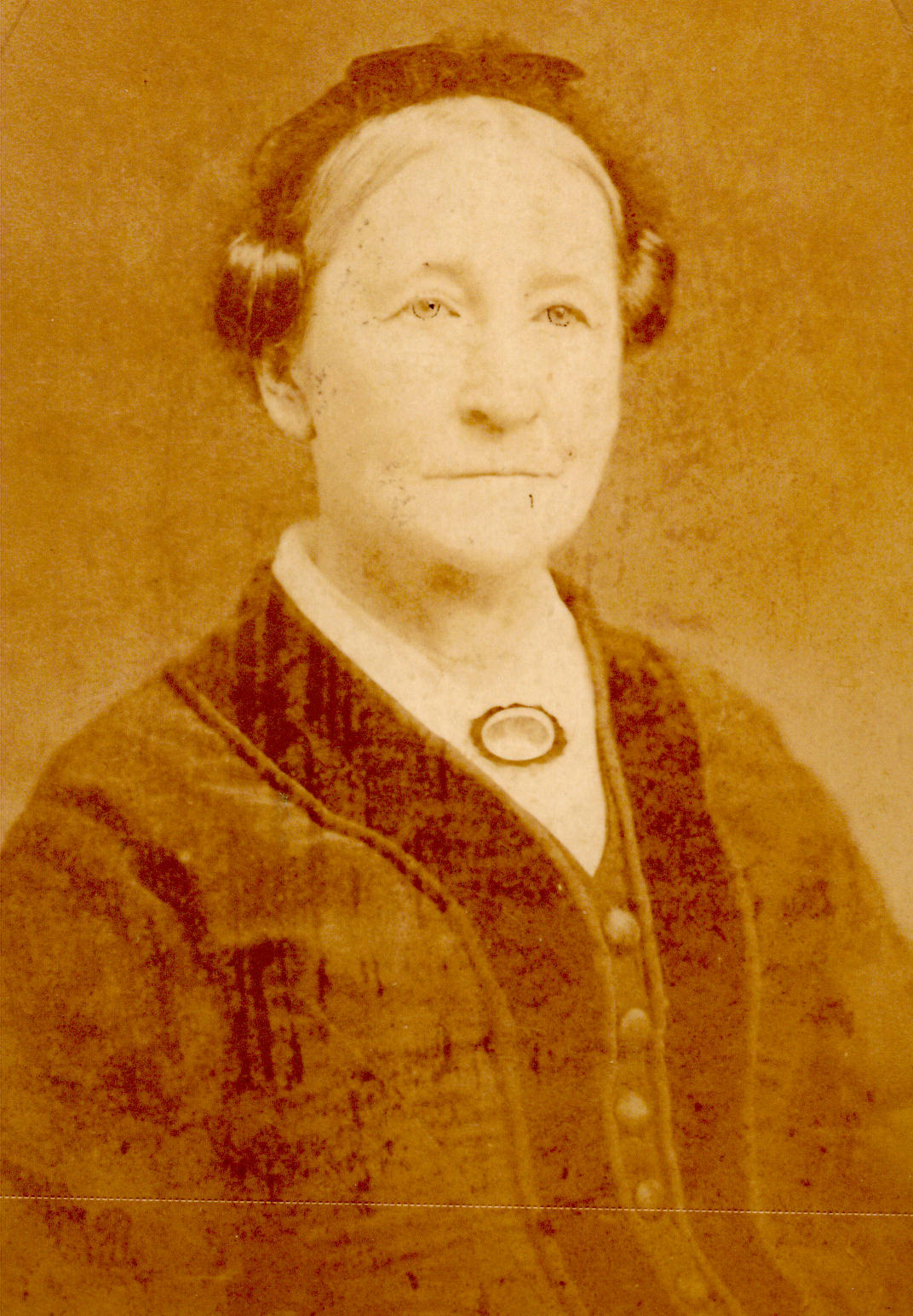
Almena Caldwell King, Ward's grandmother

Ward's father, Robert Quigley King, who was born on August 13, 1832, in Tarlton, was their first child to survive. Understandably, Almena insisted on going along with David on his supply trips after that, carrying with her the infant Robert Quigley King. Their next child was Samuel Noble King, who was born in Tarlton on October 22, 1834. He went all his life by his middle name of "Noble". The Kings named him after their country neighbor, Samuel Noble, who had come from Emmitsburg, Maryland, to become one of the first settlers of Tarlton and who had a large farm just south of Tarlton. Mary Elizabeth King, was born to David and Almena in Tarlton on April 1, 1837, and David King, Jr., later to become a Civil War colonel, was born in Tarlton on September 11, 1839.

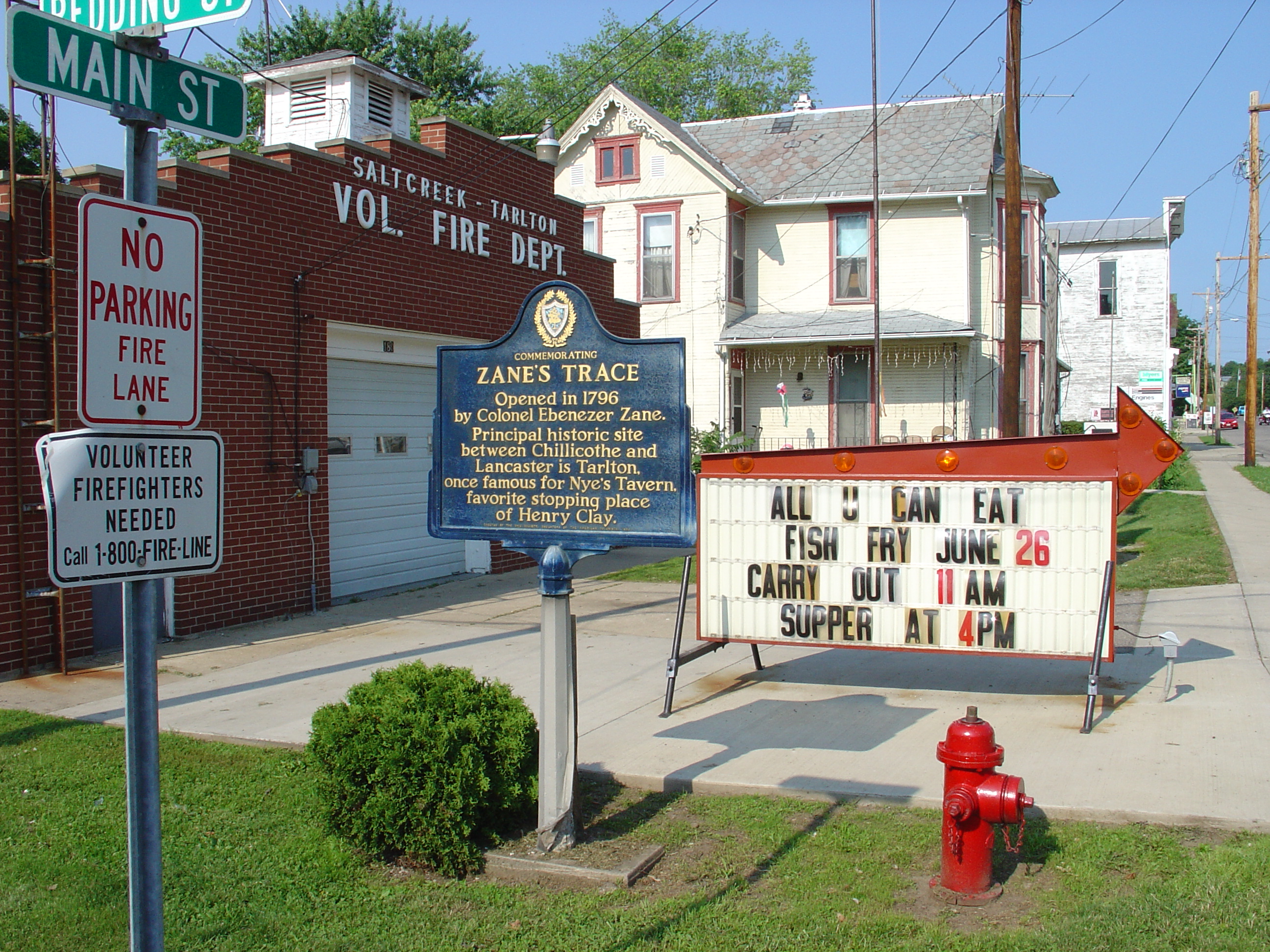
Historical Marker for Route of Zane's Trace, Tarlton, Ohio

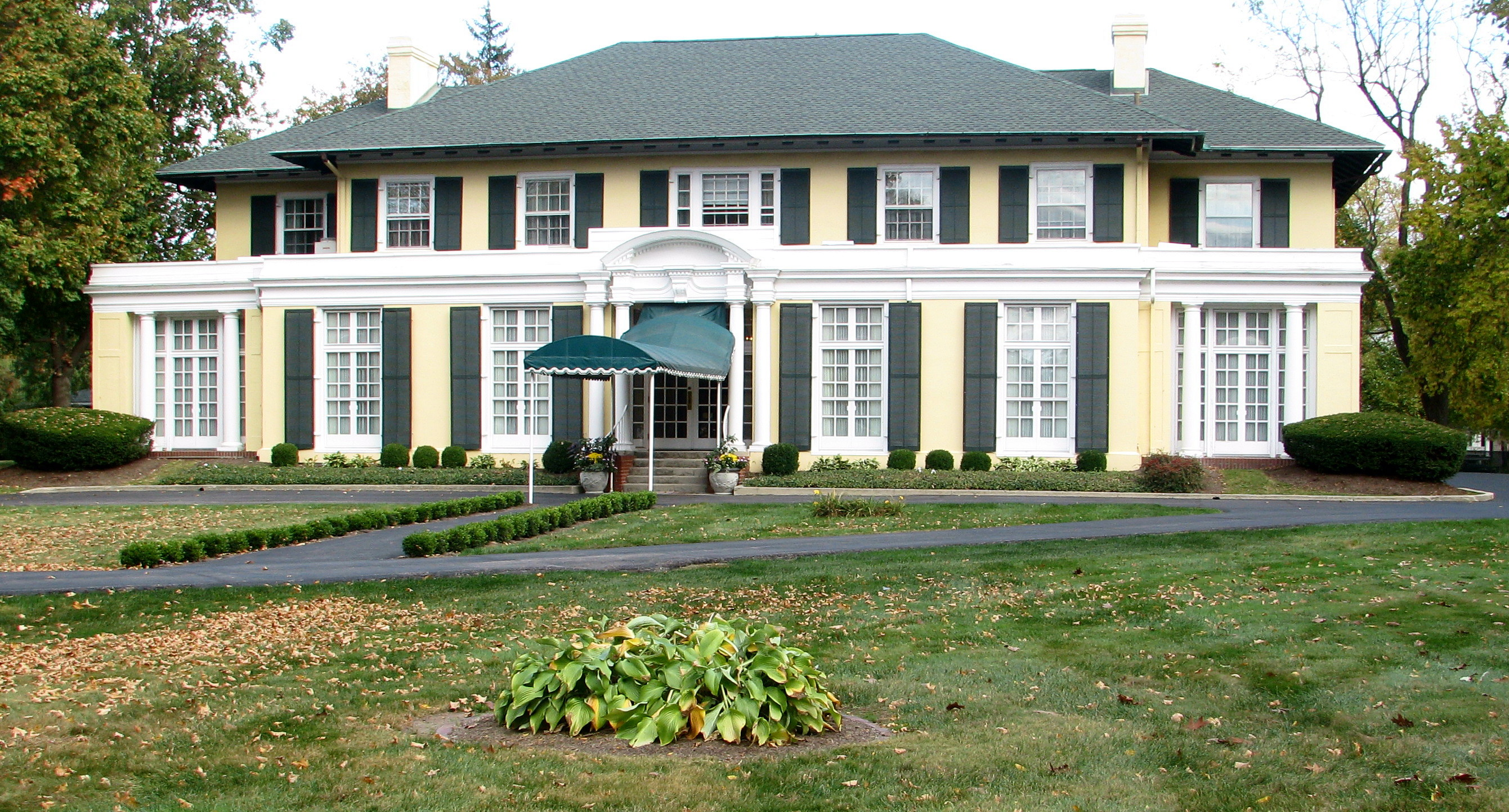
Rodgers' Mansion

As time passed, Tarlton began to lose some of its importance. The state capital was moved from nearby Chillicothe (its last location outside Columbus) to Columbus, Ohio, in 1816, and the National Road (present U.S. Route 40 or more roughly Interstate 70) went through the center of Ohio. This road started at Baltimore and ending in Illinois. So, the focus of commerce in Ohio shifted from the communities along Zane's Trace to the center of the state. Among the cities the National Road crossed was Springfield, Ohio, where it arrived in 1836 and stopped for ten years while lawmakers argued about where it would go from there. Located at that terminus, Springfield especially boomed during those ten years.

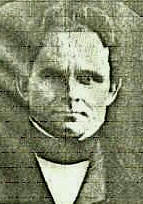
David King, Ward's grandfather

Several of Robert Quigley's grandchildren, the Rodgers families, had moved to Springfield. David's childhood companions were Robert Quigley's Rodgers grandchildren instead of Robert's children. Robert Quigley probably took in David King out of "empty nest syndrome", since his own children were grown and likely out on their own at the time he found David. According to the Quigley Family History, Robert Quigley's second daughter Jennet "Jane" Quigley married James Rodgers, her Cumberland County, Pennsylvania, neighbor, and continued to live near the Robert Quigley farm. So, it was Robert Quigley's grandchildren, Richard Rodgers, Mary Rodgers, Rachel Rodgers, Dr. Robert Rogers and William Rodgers who lived close to the Quigley farm during David's childhood. They would have been the children with whom David King grew up and with whom he would have been particularly close. Their daughter Mary Rodgers married a Cumberland County neighbor, Isaac Ward. Their daughter Rachel Rodgers never married. Their son, Dr. Robert Rodgers, married Effie Harrison, daughter of a Pennsylvania Militia brigadier general. Their son William Rodgers married the sister of Effie Sarah Harrison. All of these Quigley grandchildren, their spouses and families, apparently except Eleanor, moved to Springfield, Ohio in 1831 (source in footnote says 1833). Modern day Littleton & Rue Funeral Home now occupies the Rodgers mansion at 830 North Limestone Street, Springfield, Ohio.

Likely on their urging, David and Almena King moved to Springfield as well in 1840. David, a very astute businessman, who was already very well off, proceeded to build a significant portion of early downtown Springfield, which was known for long thereafter as "King's Row". Their daughter, Sarah Jane King, was born to them in Springfield on December 20, 1841. Their daughter Almena Caldwell King was also born there on February 1, 1848. Unfortunately, David King died on August 8, 1849, in a cholera epidemic, which he contracted while caring for other victims of the outbreak.

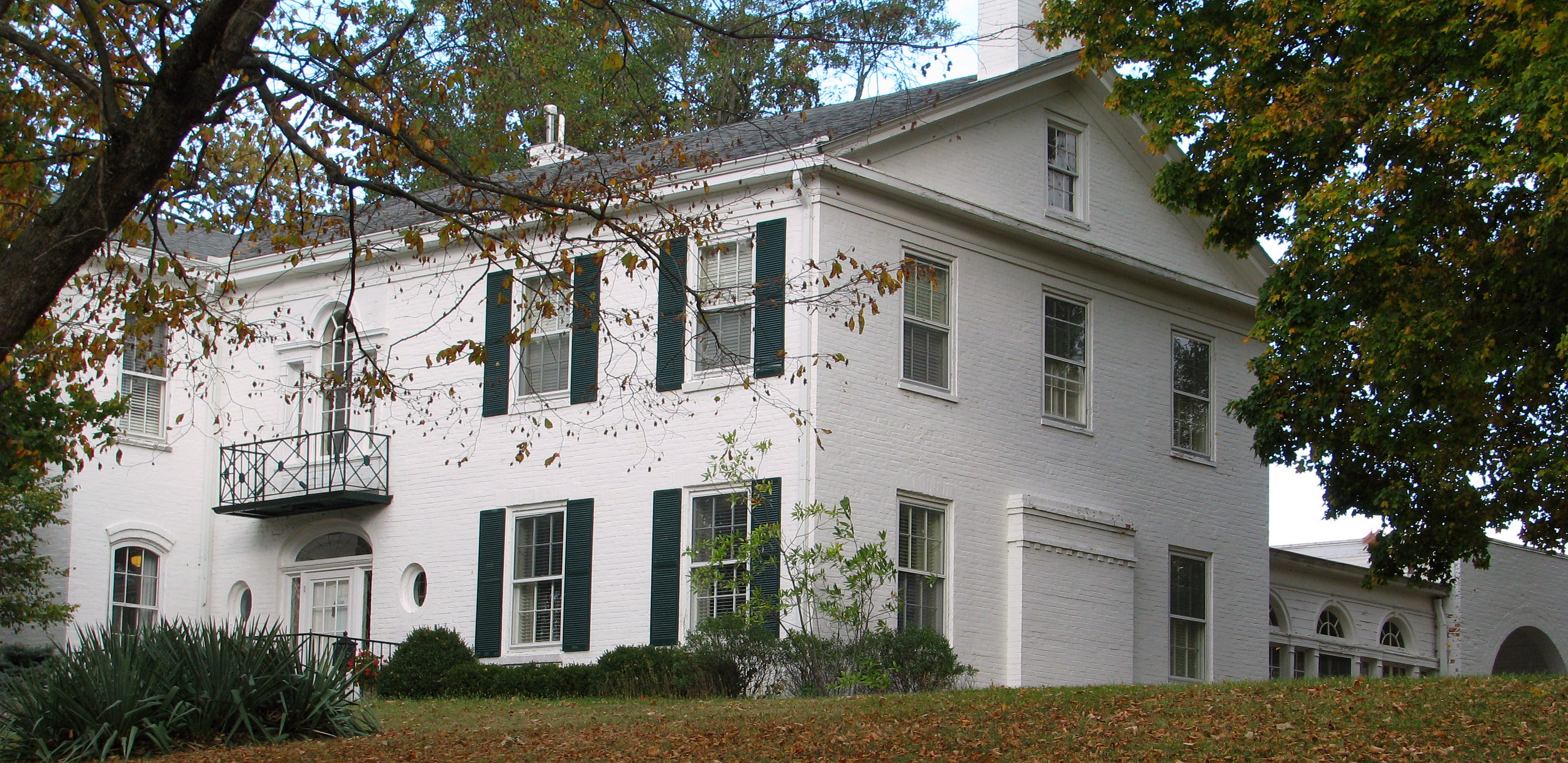
Isaac Ward Mansion

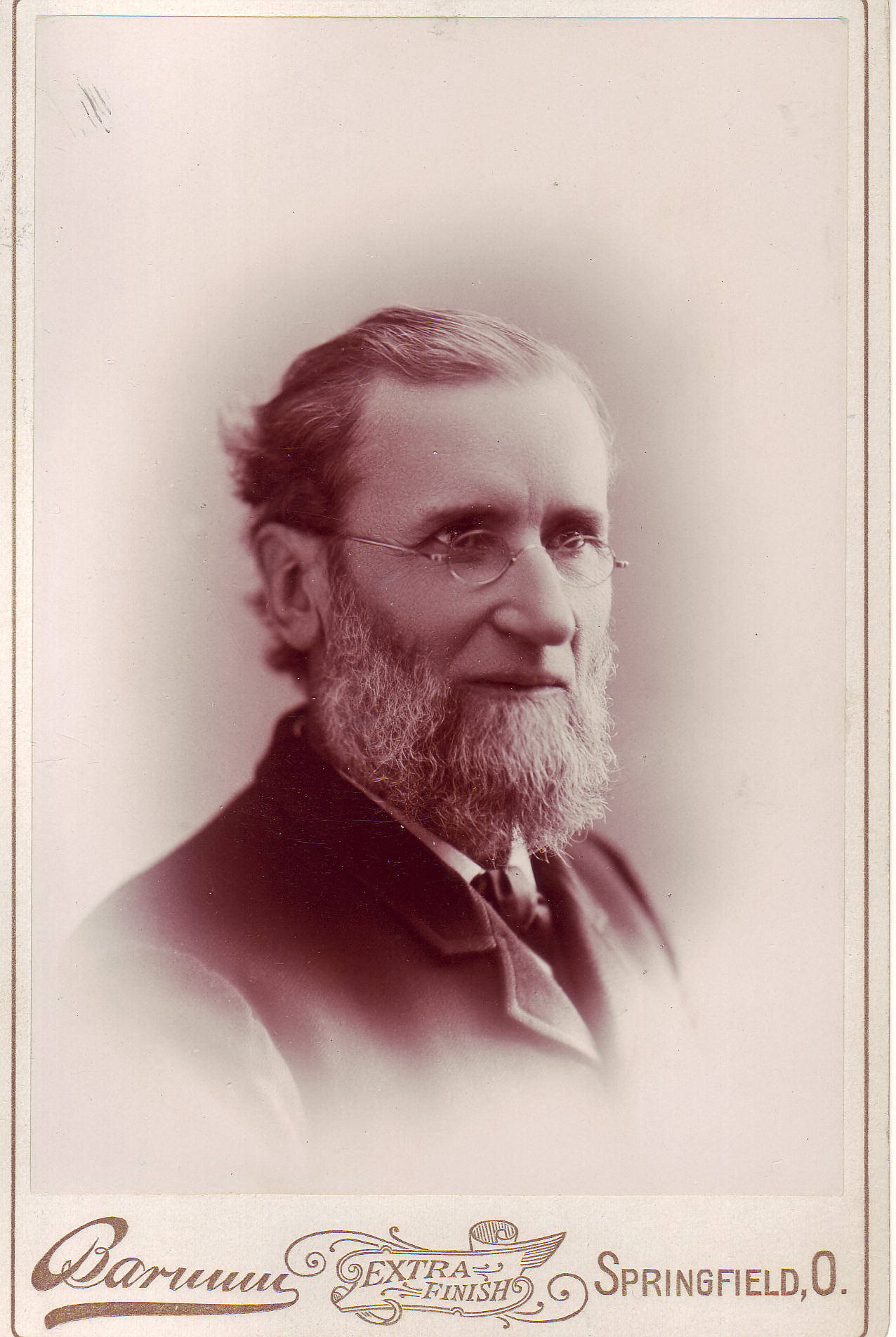
Rev. Luther Alexander Gotwald, D.D., c.1890

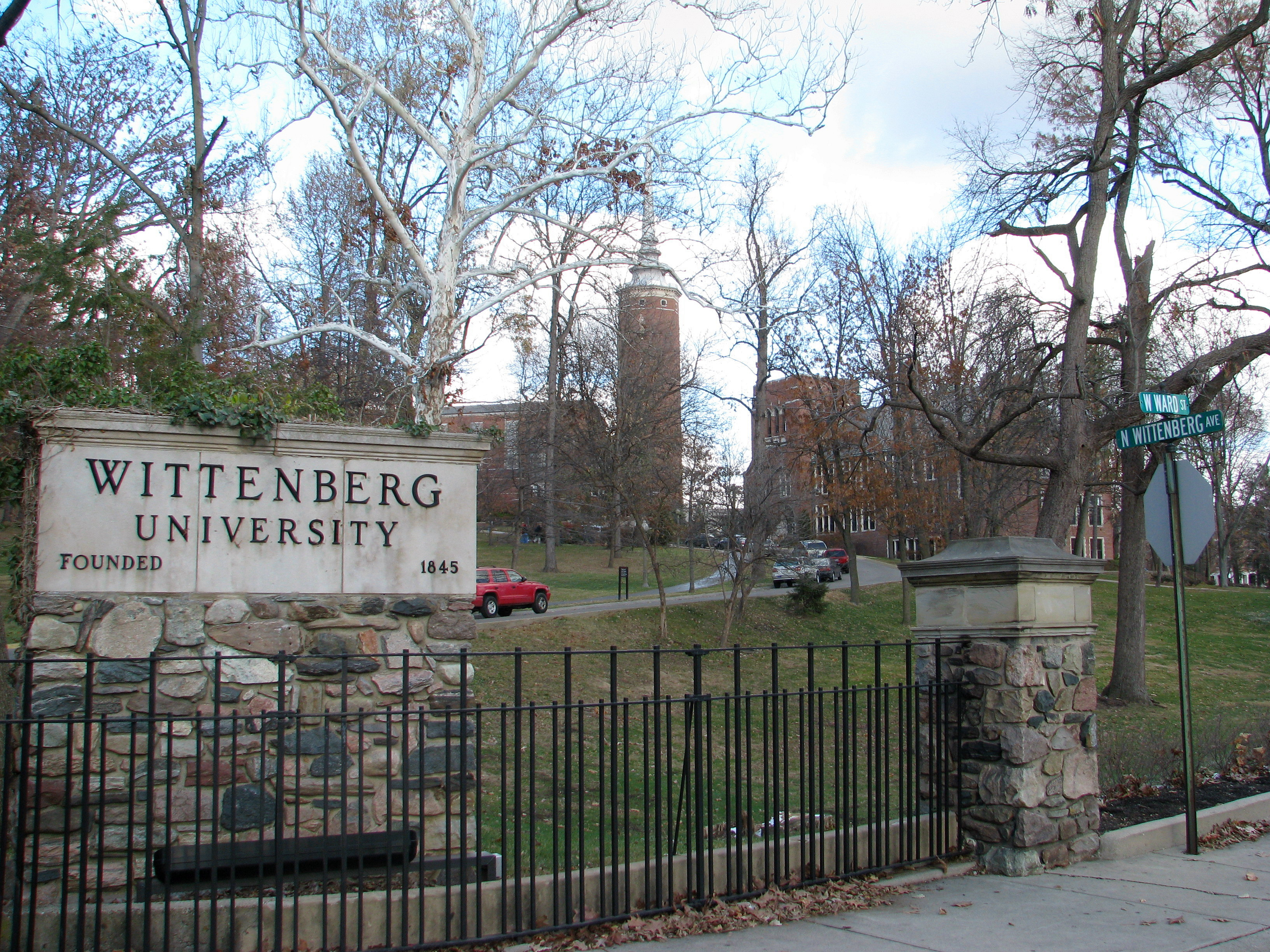
Ward Street, Wittenberg University

After her husband's death, Almena frugally held on to the family wealth. She built a large home at 2 Ferncliff Place in Springfield in about 1852, which was long known as the King Homestead. The Springfield City Directory of that time located it simply as "North of Buck Creek." Buck Creek has long marked the north boundary of downtown Springfield. There are tall limestone cliffs on both sides of it. Isaac Ward cut building stone from these cliffs, at the location of present-day Cliff Park in Springfield, that later became part of many of the early buildings in Springfield. There was only the Limestone Street footbridge across Buck Creek at the time Almena King built the King Homestead, and that footbridge was more than a block upstream. She bought this land from Robert Quigley's grandson-in-law, Isaac Ward, who lived across the street on present-day Fountain (then Market). The Isaac Ward Mansion still stands today and is still occupied. The Kings and the Quigley descendants remained very close, which is why Ward's father gave him the middle name of "Ward", and Ward went by that middle name all his life. One family account credits Isaac Ward with having been particularly helpful to the King family after the death of David King. Isaac Ward also sold a large tract of his land to Wittenberg College, which now forms the eastern part of its campus and is the reason the main road through present day Wittenberg University is Ward Street. The King Homestead was out in the country when first built, which was to get her boys away from the reported 122 saloons near their home in Springfield proper. All three of her sons attended nearby Wittenberg College.

Almena Caldwell King died of diabetes on May 30, 1878, from which she had suffered greatly for a long time before it finally claimed her. Her son-in-law, Lutheran minister and later Wittenberg professor Luther Alexander Gotwald, happened to drop in while passing through Springfield on a train and was able to greatly comfort her during her last hours. The King Homestead stayed in the King family for a long time after Almena's death. However, eventually it was sold to Chi Omega sorority of Wittenberg University and is today its sorority house.

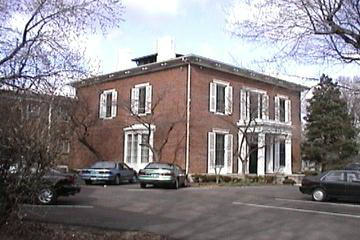
King Homestead today, Wittenberg Chi Omega sorority

After Almena's death, Rev. Gotwald wrote a biography of David and Almena in which he wrote:

"He was a most devoted husband, a firm and yet a most affectionate father, and eminently, honorable and successful, a consistent and faithful Christian, a trustee of the First Presbyterian Church, and an intelligent, genial, liberal, talented and noble man in all things. You are indebted largely to him for most of your temporal blessings which you enjoy, for without his industry, economy and business success, your lot in life would be entirely different. Revere therefore, his memory. Ever think of him gratefully and affectionately, often visit his grave in the cemetery at Springfield, Ohio. And always seek to imitate his character and life, thus showing yourselves worthy descendants of such an estimable ancestor."

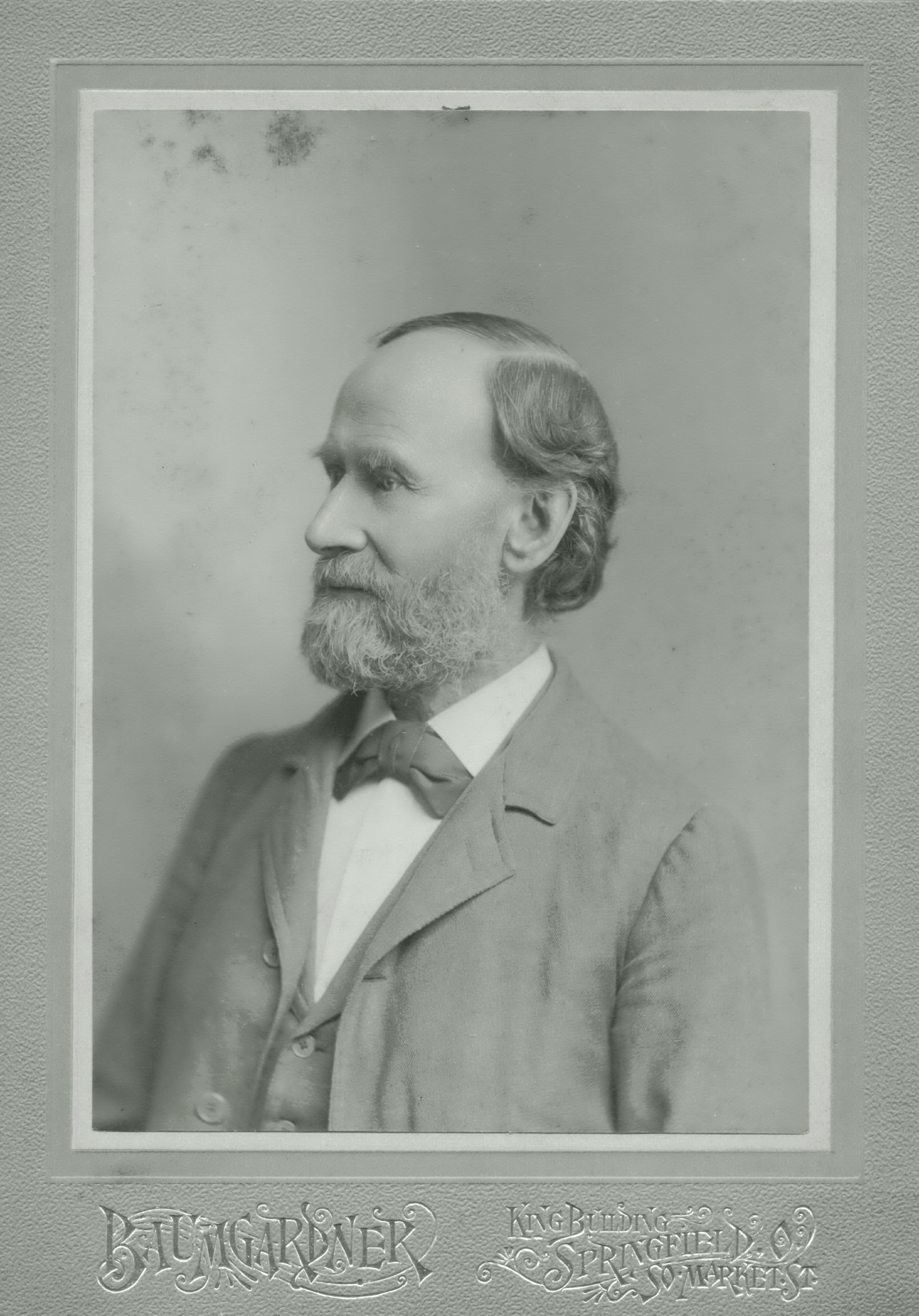
Robert Quigley King, father of David Ward King

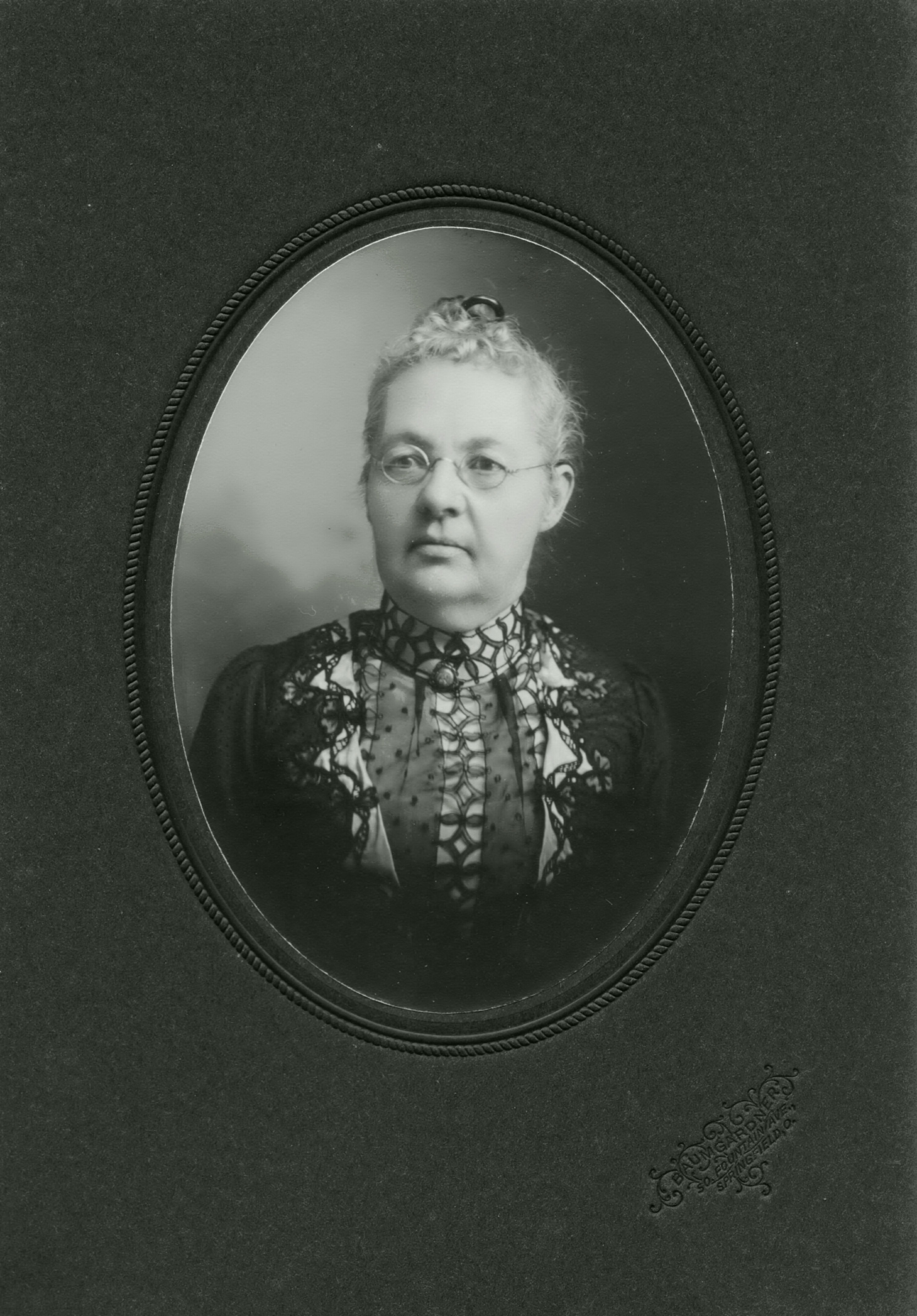
Harriet Danforth King, mother of David Ward King

Of all the descendants of the first David King, his grandson, David Ward King undoubtedly did the most to live up to the spirit and the letter of Rev. Gotwald's counsel.

David Ward King was born on October 27, 1857, in Springfield, Ohio. His father was real estate developer, investor and Springfield Fire Chief, Robert Quigley King. His mother was Harriet Danforth King. As mentioned, Robert Quigley King, was born in Tarlton, Ohio, and was the first child of Almena and David King to survive.

Robert Quigley King came to a largely undeveloped Springfield at age nine in 1840, with his sister, Mary Elizabeth, age three and his brother, David Jr. age one. He attended the early Springfield schools. He later recalled hunting for squirrels in a woods that later became the train station (now demolished) and what would be close to the location of the present Clark County Library. His father died when he was eighteen. Nonetheless, his mother was able to send him and, as they arrived at college age, his brothers to Wittenberg College. At one time, she had them all in college at the same time—and Almena could afford that. When Robert Quigley King first started at Wittenberg, it held classes in the lecture room of the First Lutheran Church. However, while he was a student, Wittenberg moved to what is now the western part of its present-day campus. He was in the first class to graduate from Wittenberg. The history of early Springfield mentions how much he liked to hunt, especially in the woods that later became today's Snyder Park, which would have been just down Buck Creek from his childhood home at the King Homestead.

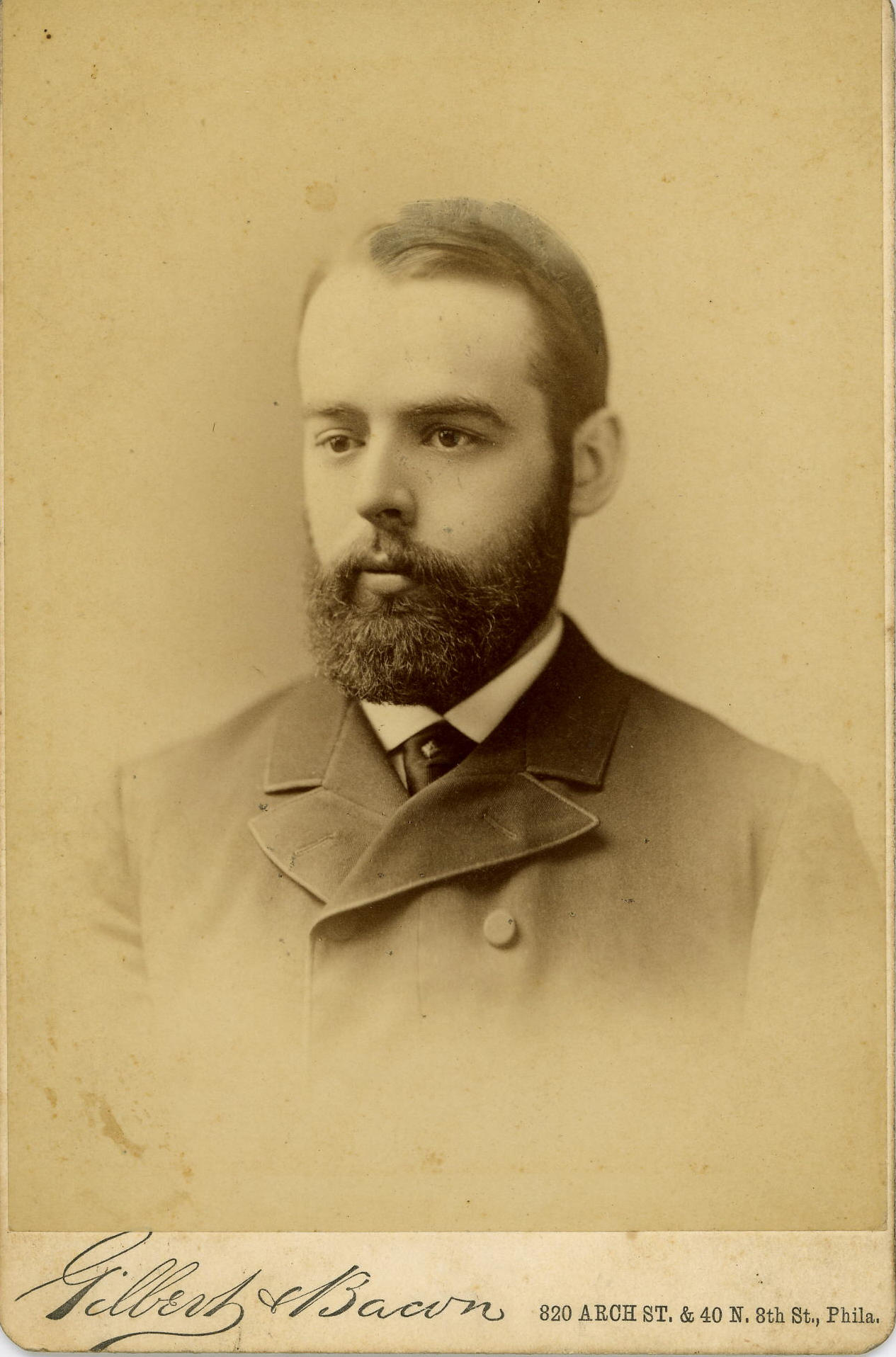
Ward's brother Dr. Thomas Danforth King, M.D.

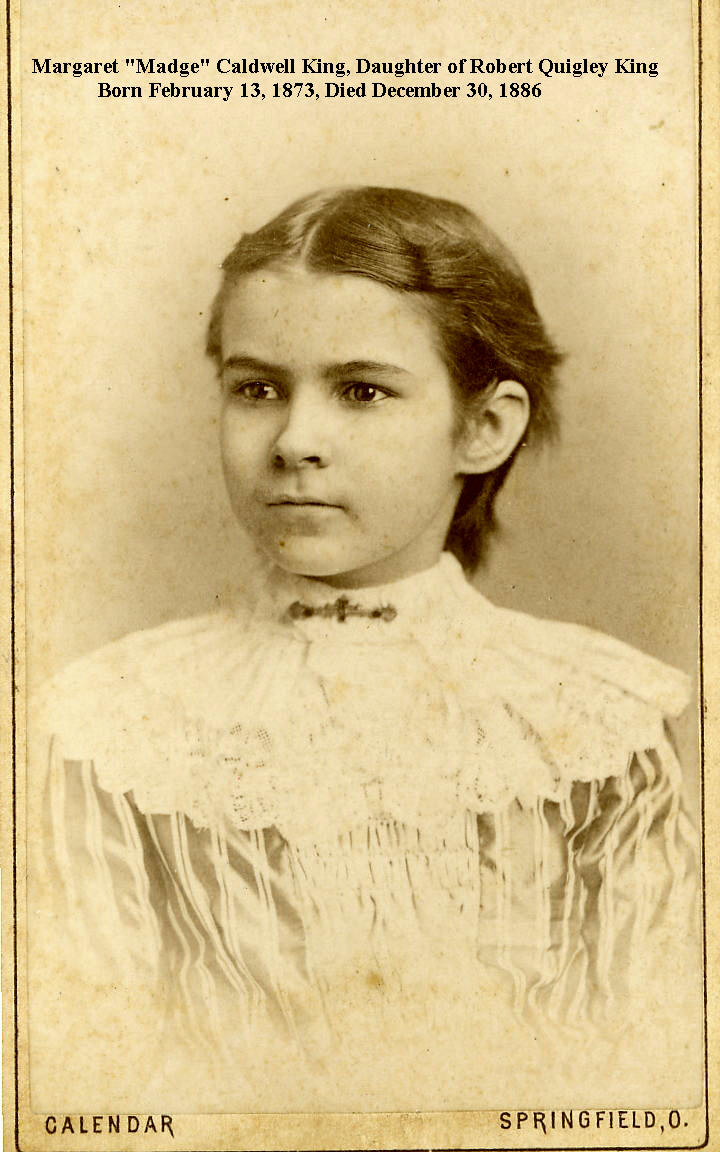
Ward's sister, Margaret "Madge" Caldwell King

Robert Q. King married Miss Harriet A. Danforth at New Albany, Indiana, on January 15, 1857. To them were born five children: David Ward King on October 27, 1857; Dr. Thomas Danforth King, who was born on July 20, 1859, and who died December 23, 1889; Robert Leffler King, who was born on August 24, 1863; Almena Adaline King (Warrick), who was born on September 17, 1869; and Margaret "Madge" Caldwell King, who was born on February 13, 1873, and who died when she was fourteen years old on December 30, 1886. Ward's ill-fated brother, Dr. Thomas Danforth King, was a graduate of Princeton and a practicing physician in Springfield. He took his name from his direct ancestor, Thomas Danforth, who was Lieutenant Governor of Massachusetts, a founder of Harvard College, a judge at the Salem witch trials and on whose estate the city of Framingham, Massachusetts, is situated today. Framingham has a museum named after him. There was a Thomas Danforth in every generation after that, until Dr. Thomas Danforth King, who died before he married his fiancée and had children. He died a slow and painful death from cancer of the eye, in his parents' home with his fiancée at his side. His death left David Ward King and Robert Leffler King as the surviving sons of Robert Quigley and Harriet King. Ward's sister, Almena Adaline King, married industrialist Harvey Warrick in Springfield, Ohio. She died December 18, 1941, in Cleveland, and he died on April 21, 1942.

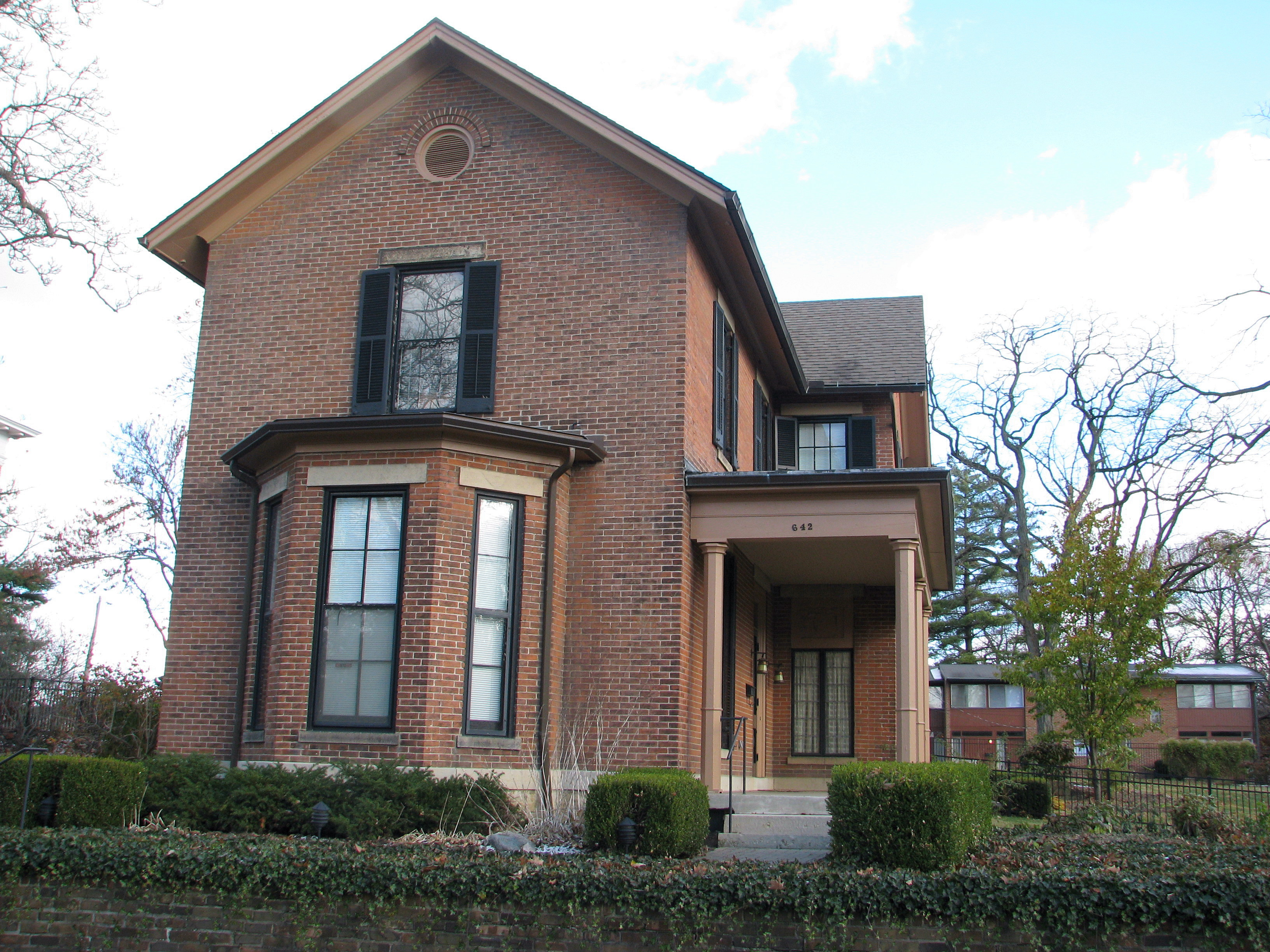
Robert Quigley King Home

As Almena's oldest child, Robert Quigley King soon became involved in helping his mother manage the family's real estate holdings in Springfield. He had several retail businesses in Springfield, but his primary activity seems to have been real estate development. The family built the King Building on what was then Market Street and later became Fountain Street, just north of High Street. The King Building became the headquarters for the temperance movement in Springfield and also the location for Bumgardner Studio, where many of the photos of the people who lived in Springfield in the late 19th century were taken. He subdivided land on present-day North Wittenberg Avenue, just south of Wittenberg University, into the "Robert Quigley King Second Addition to the City of Springfield, Ohio." He built his own home at 642 North Wittenberg Avenue. He later moved to live in an apartment in the King Building, allowing his son Robert Leffler King to occupy it. Upon his death, he left the house to his daughter Almena King Warrick and her husband Harvey Warrick.

Robert Quigley King served as Fire Chief for Springfield from 1879 until 1891. His obituary and the History of the Springfield Fire Department both credit him with being Springfield's second Fire Chief. However, the Fire Department History goes on to point out that several others before him performed that function, but did not carry the title. In those days, Fire Chief was an elected position. It is mentioned both in his obituary and in King family tradition that during a fire at the "whip factory", he was on a roof that collapsed, dumping him into the midst of the flames. However, the other firemen immediately poured their hoses on him, saving his life. He was pulled from the fire, badly injured, but alive.

== Maitland, Missouri farmer ==
David Ward King often went by his middle name of "Ward", and he wrote it as "D. Ward King". His education was obtained in the Springfield, Ohio public schools and in Wittenberg College (now Wittenberg University) in Springfield. On December 29, 1880, he married Mary Willie (often spelled "Wylie") Burbank of Danville, Kentucky, in Springfield. Mary was born in Danville, Kentucky, on September 23, 1859. Mary was the daughter of Austin Milton and Lettitia (Reed) Burbank. He moved from Springfield, Ohio to this Maitland, Missouri, farm as a recently married young man and began farming there. While living on that farm, he invented the King Road Drag (very famous in its day), which made country roads passable in wet weather and is still credited with making possible reliable rural mail delivery and the practicality of the automobile.

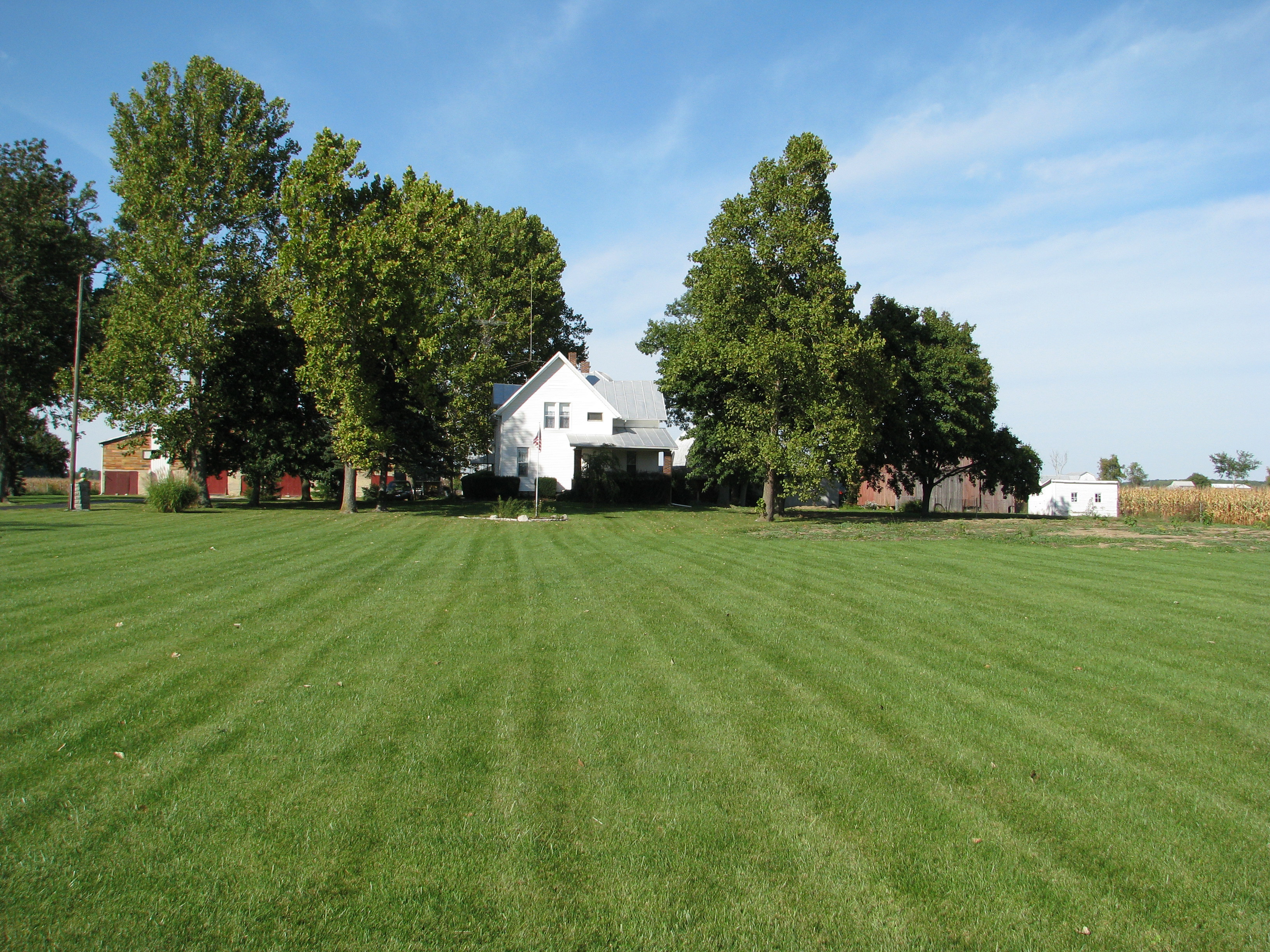
Grassland Farm today, near Vanlue, Ohio

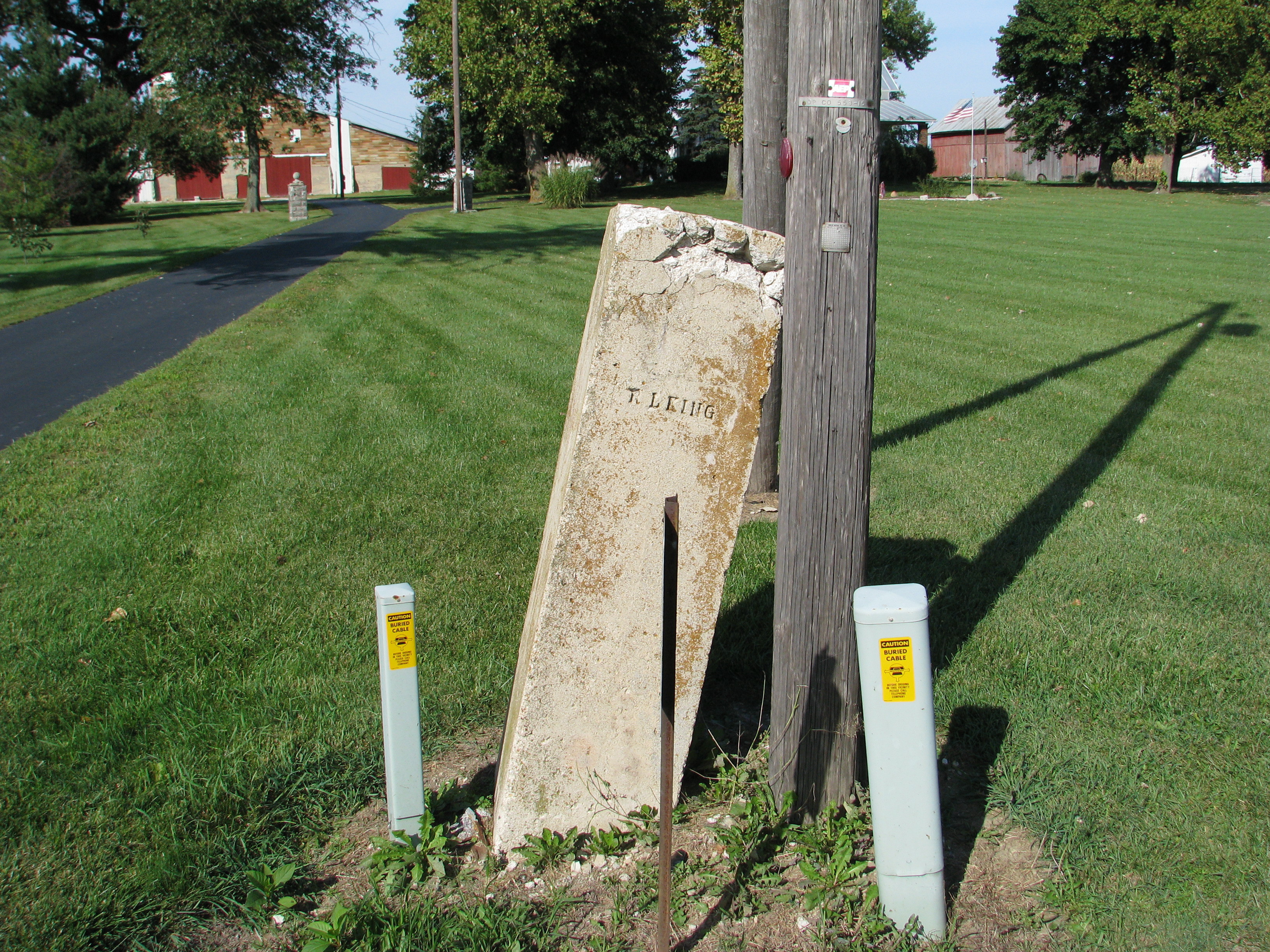
Stone erected by Robert Leffler King in front of Grassland Farm

Probably as early as 1877 or 1878, his father, Robert Quigley King, obtained some 1,597 acres (646 ha) near Maitland in Holt County, Missouri. Family stories hold that his father received this land as the only asset of value owned by a person who owed him a lot of money as the only available way to obtain payment of that debt. After obtaining this farm in that way, his father retained it, even though this acquired farm was in far-off Missouri. When his father had acquired this farm and decided to keep it, he had to do something with it. Ward was his answer. So, Robert Quigley sent his son Ward to this farm in the spring of 1879 to begin farming it. During that summer Ward helped to thresh grain. However, Ward and Mary apparently did not actually move there until January 1881.

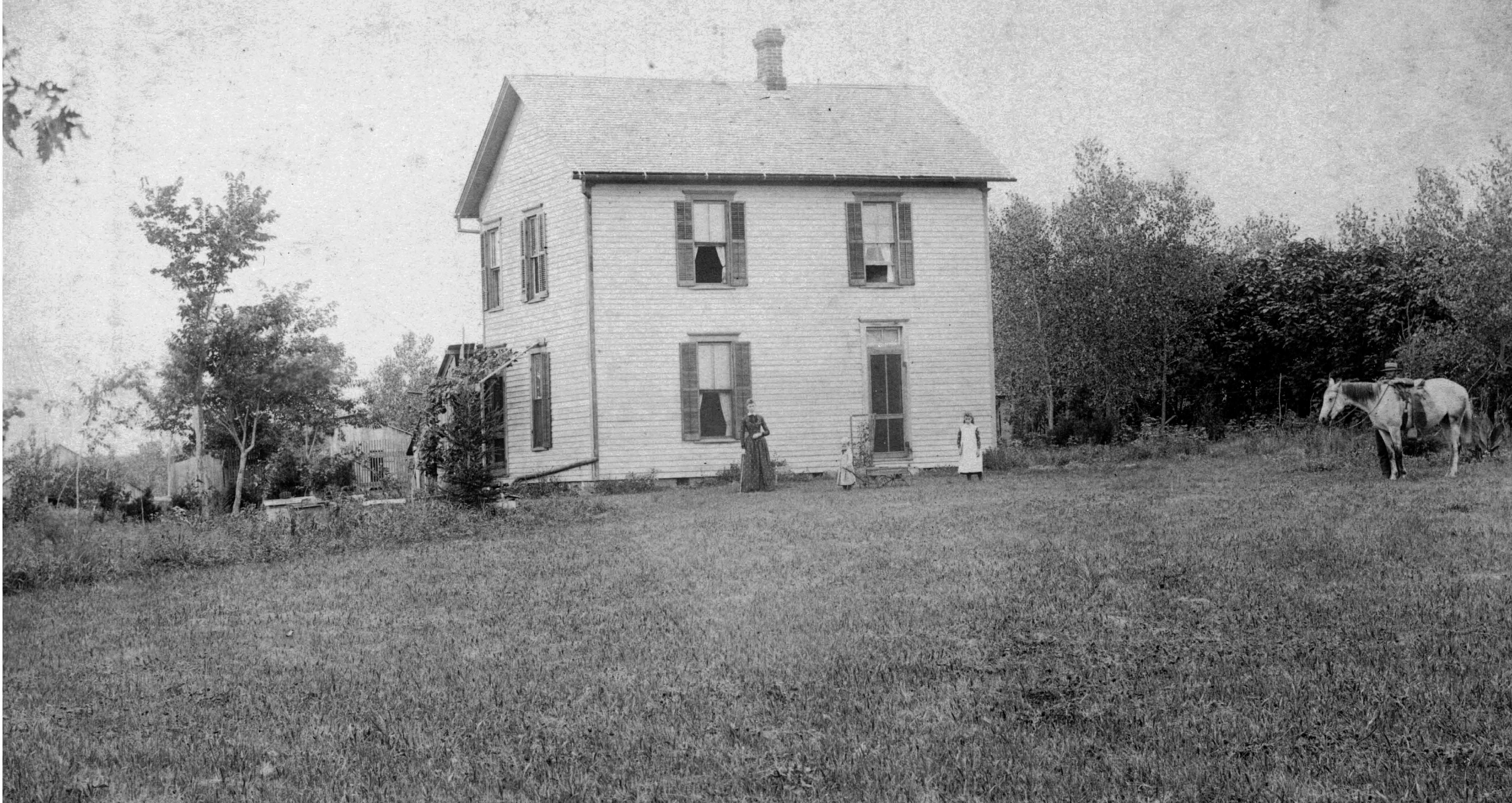
David Ward King Farm House, C. 1900

There is reason to believe that Ward's move to this farm was not completely voluntary, since, for generations back, there had been no farmers in his family. Years later, Robert Quigley King acquired another large tract of what was this time raw farm land in much closer Hancock County, Ohio, near the small village of Vanlue. In 1887, he sent his other surviving son, Robert Leffler King (who also went by his middle name, "Leffler"), off to develop that land and farm it. Leffler arrived at this land without buildings in the "thick of winter". There is no doubt that Leffler did not want to leave the ease of the family wealth in Springfield for a hard farm life. However, family members who knew him say he could not stand up to his father. So, he went, erected a house and farm buildings and otherwise developed the farm, overcoming many obstacles. He met and married his wife, Lola Montez Askam King, in the Vanlue community and brought up his family on this farm, which he called "Grassland Farm". He describes his many hardships in his farm journal, which hardships were probably very similar to the ones Ward must have experienced in turning himself into a farmer on his Maitland farm.

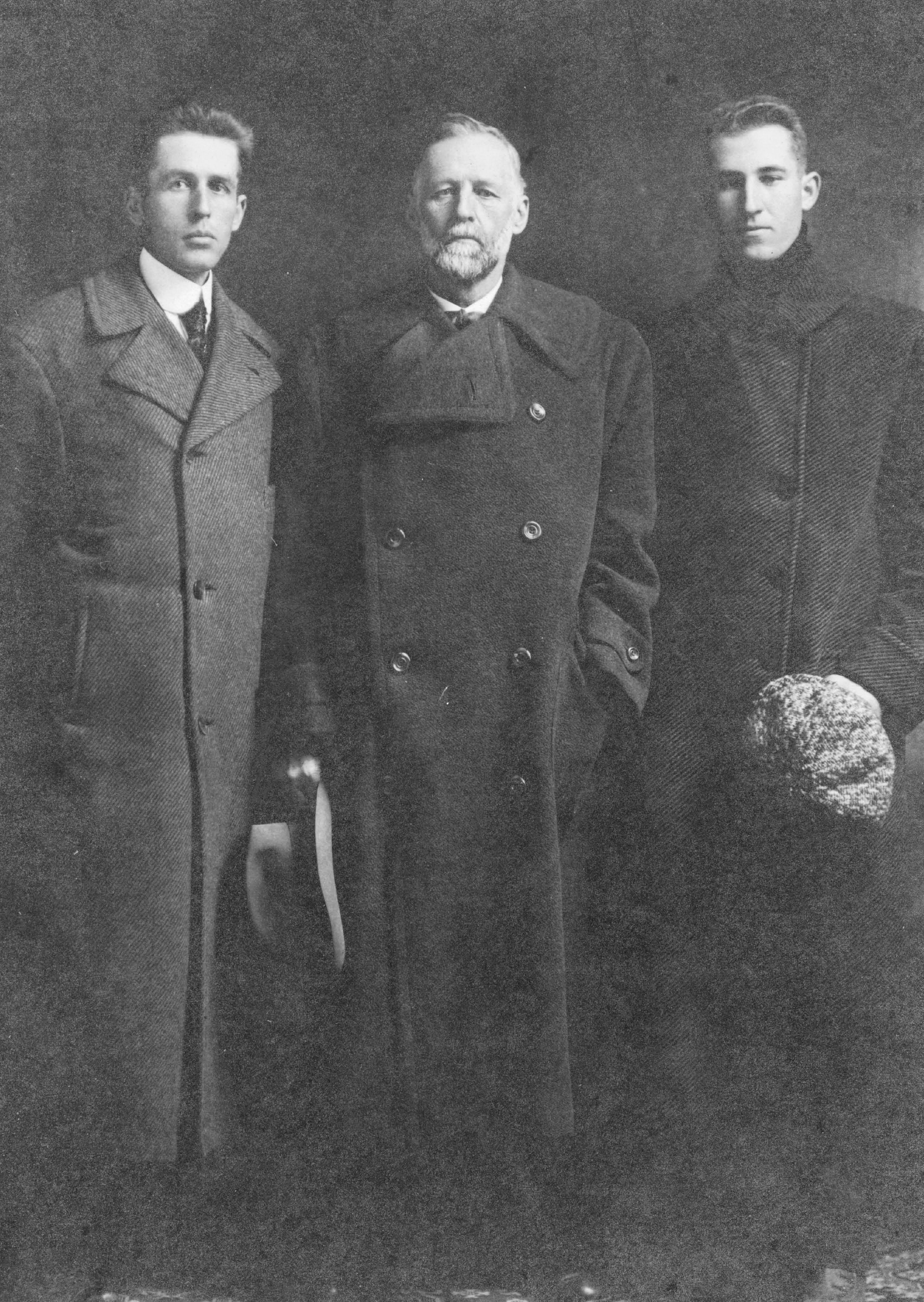
Robert Quigley King II, D. Ward King, David Bryant King

Ward's situation was similar, but his invention provided him with financial opportunities. Family members state that the fact that the travels associated with the promotion of his invention took him away from the farm a lot was not something city-bred Ward considered to be disagreeable. In fact, his son David Bryant King had pretty much taken over operation of the farm by the time he reached eighteen. Leffler, after many years on his Hancock County farm, was finally able to move back to Springfield to help his father manage the family's considerable real estate holdings during his father's declining years. Like his brother, his son Edwin Askam King pretty much took over the operation of Grassland Farm. Although separated by distance, the brothers always remained very close, and they constantly worked together on the family's real estate undertakings in Springfield. Ironically, in the remarkably parallel lives of these two Springfield-reared farmers, their children were more farm people than they were.

In what was the King family tradition, David Ward was an implacable warrior against alcoholic beverages and the saloons that sold them. Leffler King's wife, Lola Montez King, proudly mentioned in her autobiography that they attended a temperance convention during their honeymoon.

For his part, David Ward King organized the Prohibition Party in Missouri. He often spoke in district school houses on the topic. In Holt County, Mrs. King often went him on his crusades to ban the use of alcoholic drinks. Many were violently against prohibition and, as a result, against David Ward King as well. One time, at Eureka school house, someone went so far as to lodge a fence board between the spokes of the two rear wheels of the Kings' buggy so it would hit Ward in the head when he started out. As a result, he had to carefully inspect his buggy, before starting home after these temperance meetings. David Ward left the party later, because he felt prohibition alone was not enough for their platform, but he remained a staunch prohibitionist all his life.

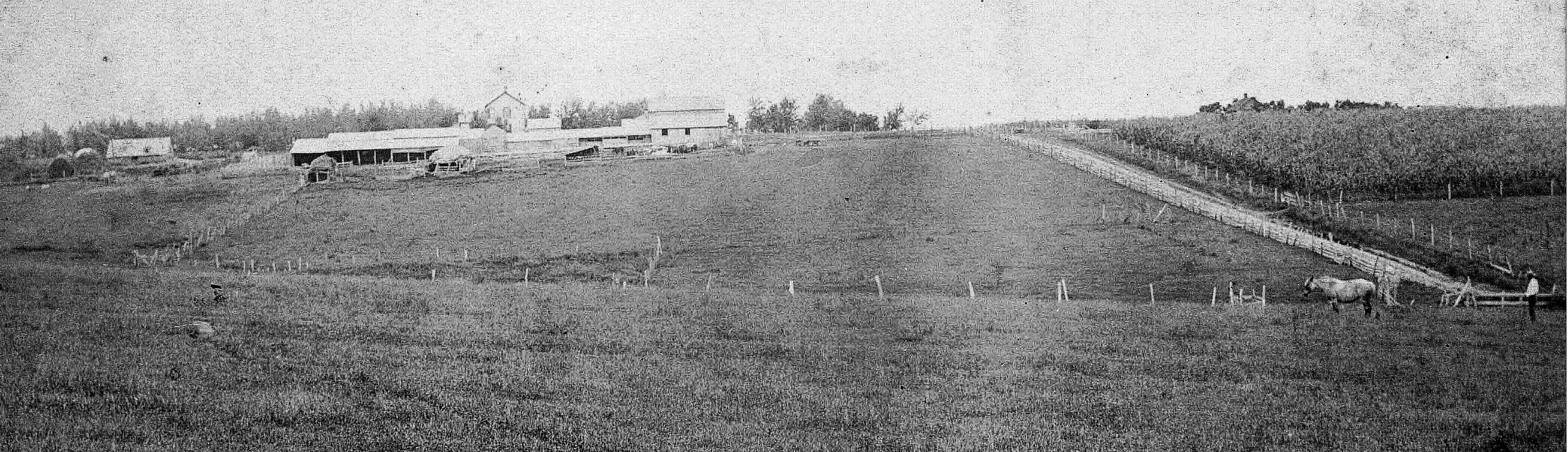
David Ward King Farm C.1900

The Kings were early members of the Maitland M.E., church and their two older children attended this church with them. The Kings and Lettie "Reed" King, their oldest daughter, became charter members of the First Presbyterian Church of Maitland. The Kings heavily involved themselves in civic and church affairs. He sat as one of the first trustees of Maitland's First Presbyterian Church and taught in the "Sabbath School".

David Ward King was a progressive farmer. He actively sought improved methods of farming. He constantly took measures to prevent washes and soil depletion on his land. He established some of the first bluegrass pastures in his township. He was a life member of the Holt County Farm Bureau.

In cooperation with Mr. J.R. Collision, Professor J.C. Crosen, Dr. Ira Williams and others, David Ward King was instrumental in bringing a Lyceum Course (a group of men who met for regular lectures and debates on topics of interest) to Maitland. He later became a life member of the Lyceum Association. The King home was often the headquarters for visiting clergy and for Lyceum entertainers.

== Invention of the King Road Drag ==
It was in 1896 that D. Ward King first dragged the road with an old frostbitten pump stock and an oak post. The improvement in the dirt roads it worked was dramatic. Until then, the only way to firm up dirt roads had been to dump layers of stone on them and then press it in with a heavy roller to make a road surface resistant to turning into muck after every rain. This method was fairly effective, but it was also labor-intensive and expensive. These stone-permeated roads were called "macadamized roads". These roads took their name from their Scotch inventor, John Loudon McAdam. Using his method, roads were covered with several layers of stone, starting with large ones and then reducing their size in each successive layer. The stones in the first level would be about the size of a human head. The stones in the next layer would be about the size of a fist. The final layer would be of stones of about the size of golf balls. It was grueling work to haul this heavy stone to the places needed, to unload it in the right places and then to spread it evenly over the road surface with only horse-drawn wagons and hand-held shovels and rakes. Further, in the days before powered stone crushers, there was the additional and very arduous task of smashing much bigger rocks down to the right size for use in the respective layers. This work came to be known as "making the big ones into the small ones." Men did it by hand by smashing large rocks with sledgehammers. In many states, convicts did this work and sometimes even built these macadamized roads by working on the roads themselves. When these convict crews worked directly on these roads, necessarily outside the walls of the prison, each man was typically chained to the next to prevent runaways. These convict road crews became the infamous "chain gangs" of that day. In the days of horse power, this method was just too time-consuming and expensive to be practical for widespread use.

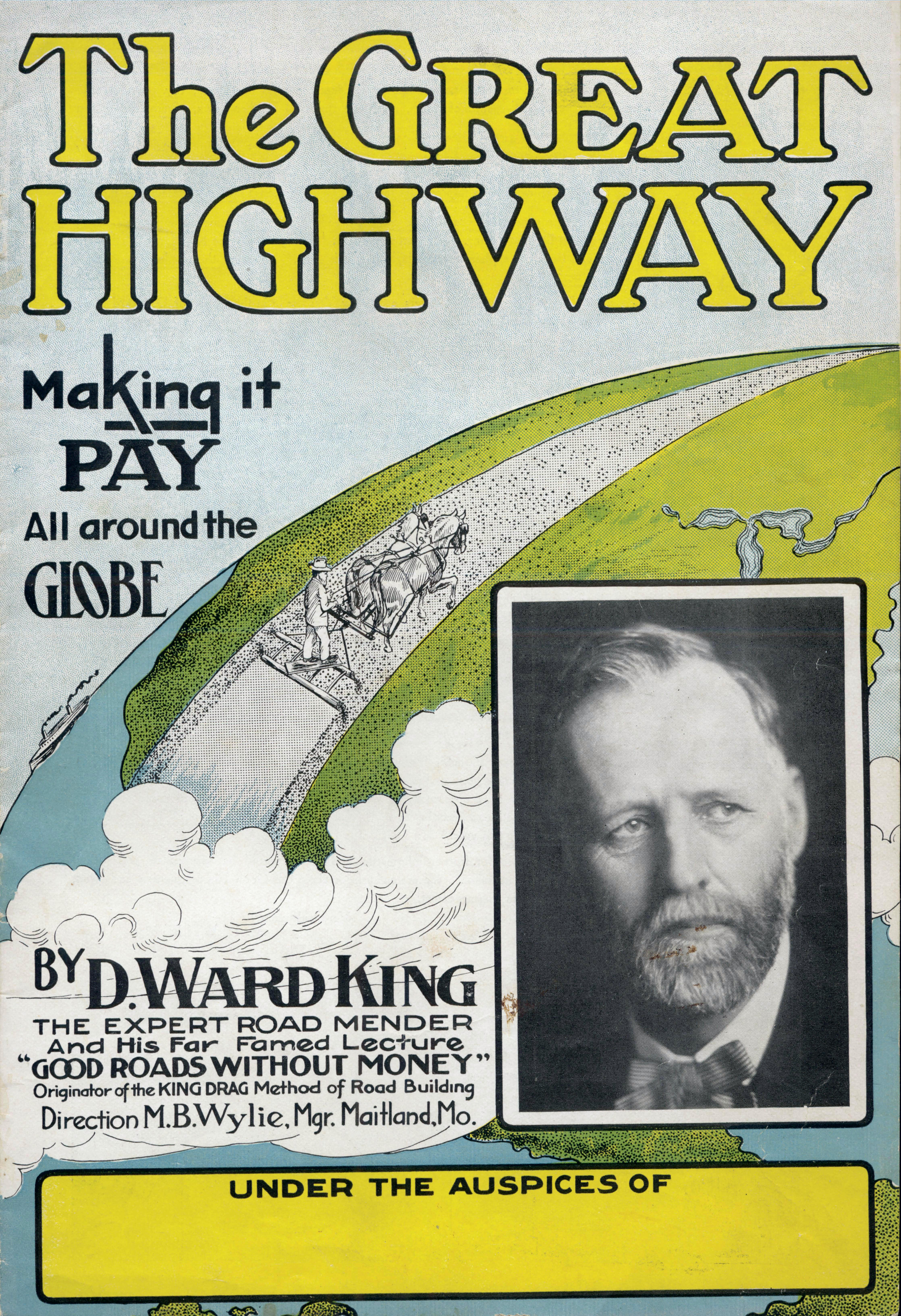
Promotional Brochure Cover

Promotional Brochure Page 2

Promotional Brochure Page 3

Promotional Brochure Page 4

The advantage of the King Road Drag was that it firmed up dirt roads by leaving a crown in the middle, which caused rain water to just run off, keeping the road dry and firm. Its crowning virtue was that, unlike pressing stone into the mud road surface, it was very quick and very inexpensive. The method quickly caught on. Draft horses, relieved of the need to drag farm wagons through mire, were able to haul a lot more farm produce to railroad sidings for transport by the railroad to distant markets. So, in 1903, Ward was employed by the Chicago and North Western Transportation Company to promote its "Good Roads Campaign." During 1904 and 1905 the railroad ran "Good Road" trains over their lines in Iowa. Ward rode these trains to instruct people along the lines on the construction and use of his invention. According to his promotional brochure, the railroad hauled him around in a "private car" and paid him a "handsome salary". His brochure, while not naming them, stated that "four important railroads" had done that. However, the enthusiasm of the railroad for improved roads quickly cooled when their ridership for short trips began to drop off dramatically. With improved local roads, people started travelling locally on their own bicycles (which were the craze of the day) and their own newly acquired automobiles. However, D. Ward King and his "Good Roads" program were already on their way, and the end of railroad support did little to stop it.

== King Meetings ==
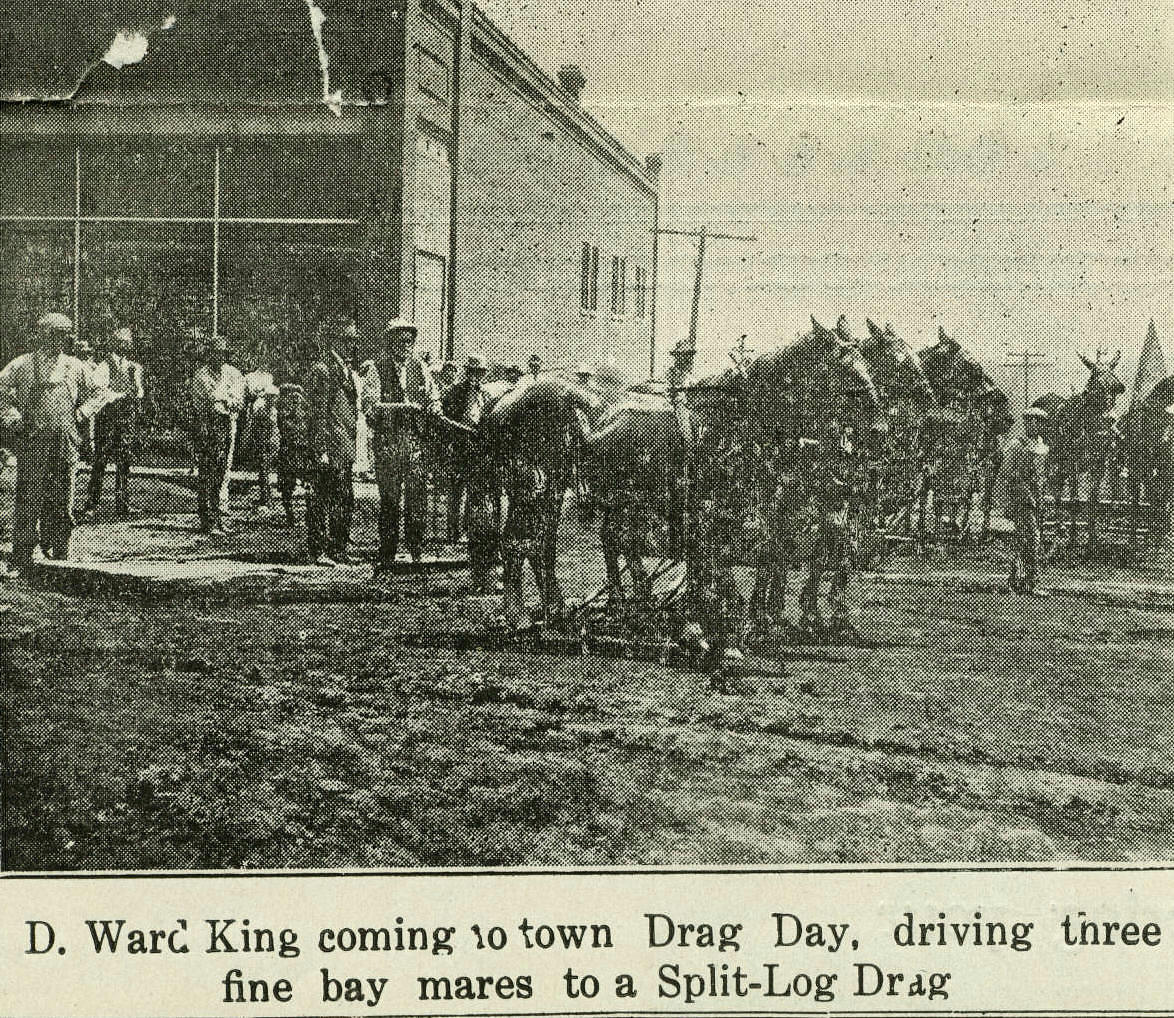
D. Ward King (in vest) demonstrating the King Road Drag in Maitland

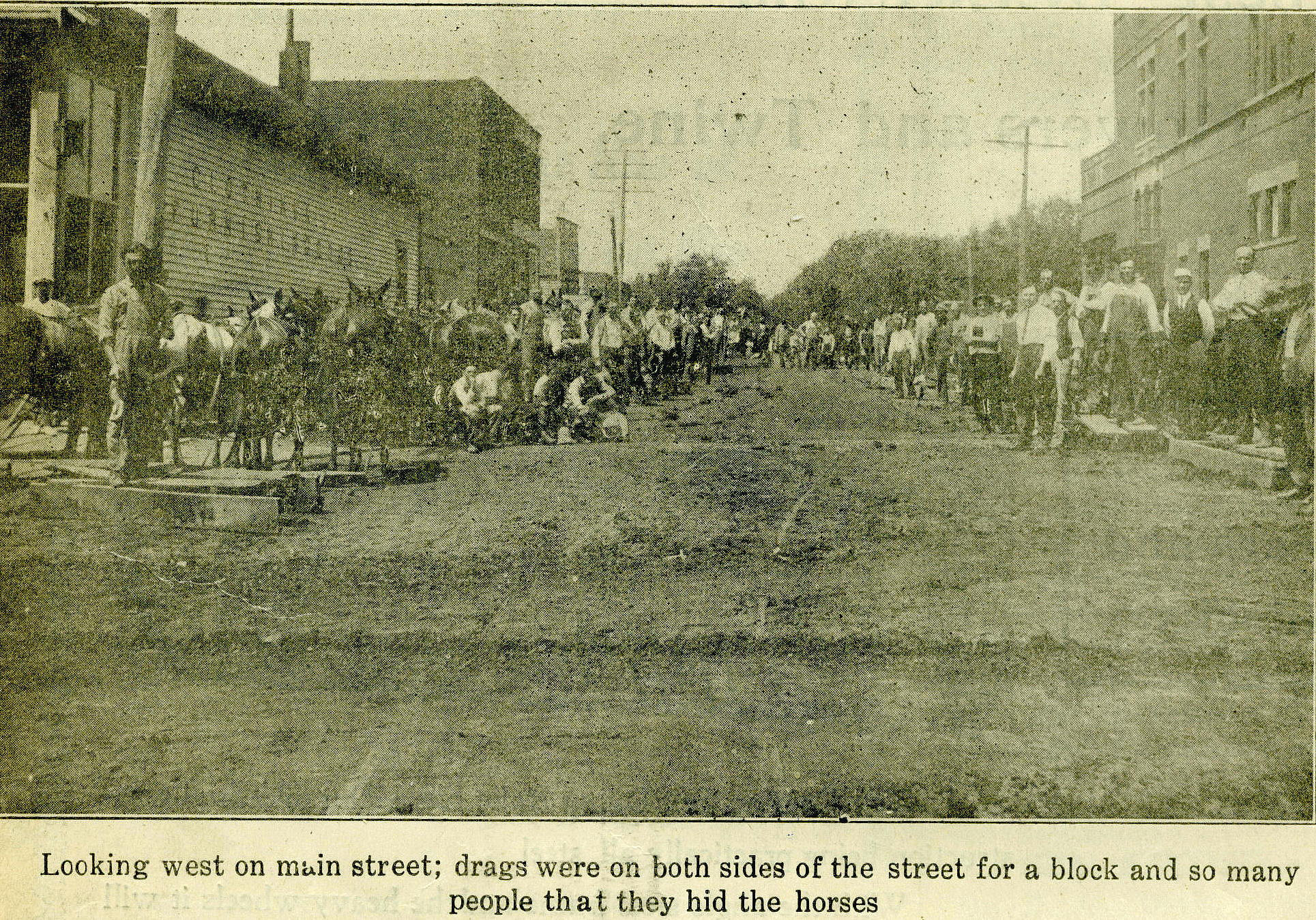
Drag Day in Maitland

The "King drag movement [came] with a rush." D. Ward King did patent his invention. However, its design was so simple that King did not enforce his patent rights. However, he did make a good living by touring the country conducting and charging sponsoring organizations for "King Meetings" in which he explained to packed houses how to build and use his road drag. Wittenberg-educated Ward was, by all accounts, an eloquent speaker. His promotional brochure claimed that "An address on this subject is not, as you might suppose, dry and uninteresting. You will find that the novelty of the idea and its practical value will attract a larger attendance than a feature of mere entertainment."

Over time, Ward conducted Good Roads campaigns in forty-six of the then-existing forty-eight states – all except Nevada and New Hampshire. He conducted them in Canada as well, including the province of Nova Scotia, where the King road drag was found better than any other method to work sandy roads, clay roads and rock roads. One Canadian journalist was so impressed that he wrote and published this poem as his tribute to Ward.

MY FAVORITE KING

By William Edward Park, Chatham (Canada) Daily News.

When knights were bold and ladies fair, and all that medieval junk.

And when for common folks like us the job of living was most punk.

When all the world was full of strife, and dangerous and that sort of thing.

The cuss who most extinguished life was usually crowned king.

But we in better days were born, when men in peace together live.

And kings are made to adorn a job that common people give.

And earn their living like the rest at banquets and that sort of thing.

Oh, nowadays it hardly pays to hold their lofty job of king.

But, there's another sort of king who still the crown of battle wears.

D. Ward's his name and he has fought for better thoroughfares.

That can be built without expense. He makes the very rafters ring.

With pleadings and arguments – and that is why his praise I sing.

For heaven knows we need good roads – good roads to let the farmer pass.

To market with his wheat and corn and sugar beets and garden sass.

And bring us closer to the farm and bring them closer to the town.

And D. Ward King, for what he's done, has pretty well earned a crown.

—

David Ward King further widely publicized the process in a U.S. Department of Agriculture Farmers' Bulletin #321 in 1908 under the title The use of the split-log drag on earth roads He also wrote articles explaining his drag, including one that appeared in the May 7, 1910, issue of The Saturday Evening Post titled "Good Roads Without Money." In 1904, the road drag and photos of its works were on display in the Agricultural Building at the Louisiana Purchase Exposition in St. Louis, Missouri. Many of these photos were taken in Clay Township. In 1910, Iowa dragged from Council Bluffs to Davenport and back in three hours. This was highlighted by the "Glidden Trail" scouts and became the River-to-River Road. During this time, Ward worked with Harry Crider, the Maitland postmaster, to post all his ever-growing mail and purchase all his ever-increasing need for boxes of stamped envelopes from the Maitland post office. This increased business made the Maitland post office eligible for its first rural route.

1910 Saturday Evening Post Article, Page 1

1910 Saturday Evening Post Article, Page 2

1910 Saturday Evening Post Article, Page 3

Within ten years of his first speech, advocating the King system, the King method spread all over the country, Canada and worldwide. His writings were translated into Spanish, which allowed South American countries to benefit by it. The Philippines and Australia adopted it. Missouri spent two thousand of the dollars of the day to drag its main roads. Whole townships organized to drag every mile of road after every rain. One township in Iowa dragged its entire road system "completely" in three hours. In 1906, the state of Iowa amended its statutes to use the King system on the country roads. In 1909, Iowa made the law mandatory and even broadened it to include the unpaved streets of the cities and towns of that state. His promotional brochure stated that "the road laws of six states have been changed to conform to Mr. King's ideas of proper road construction and road repair and maintenance."

Some Iowa farmers even had a song they sang in his praise, as they did their road dragging, which went:

Dragging the roads, dragging the roads

Dragging the roads with the King road drag;

Hard as a bone, smooth as a hone,

The roads that lead into Owasa.

—

== Family ==
Mrs. Mary Wylie King was active in women's organizations of the church. She worked for many years as an enthusiastic member of the Woman's Christian Temperance Union. She was an active member of Eastern Star, being chaplain of that order for many years. She did not like staying home while Ward travelled, a fact which she mentioned repeatedly in her letters to him. Even so, she did serve as his "manager" under one spelling of her maiden name of "M.B. Wylie". She served as the practice audience for his speeches. She edited and typed his letters, often serving as his "emergency secretary". Some called her the "Mother of Good Roads." By all accounts, she was a very strong-willed woman, with a flair for the dramatic. Family members point to the photo she had taken of herself in "widow's weeds" as an example of her endearing way of dramatizing events—in that case, the recent death of her husband. She also never lost her staunch devotion to the cause of temperance, which the repeal of Prohibition did nothing to dampen. One family member reported that there was a time when she came upon another family member having a beer. After she finished telling him in no uncertain terms what she thought about that, the two of them remained thereafter permanently estranged. However, she and Ward, the great promoter of his world changing invention, were undoubtedly the perfect pair.

David Ward and Mary Wylie King had four children, who were all born in Maitland, Missouri. They were Lettie Reed King, who was born on December 29, 1881; Robert Quigley King, who was born on December 11, 1886; Miriam Danforth King, who was born on October 24, 1892; and David Bryant King, who was born on September 9, 1897.

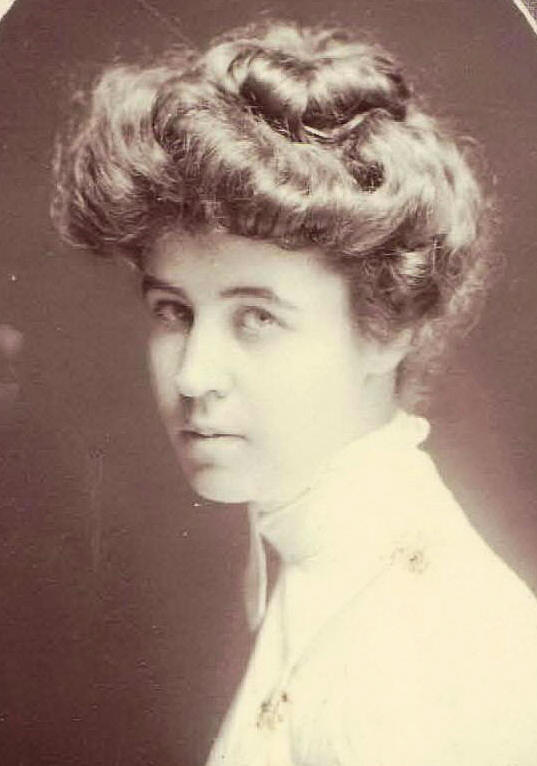
Lettie "Reed" King Crider

Lettie Reed King went by her middle name of "Reed". She followed the King family tradition, which started with the original David King, of remaining a Presbyterian. In fact, she was a charter member of the Presbyterian Church of Maitland. After her father's death, she was the family member to whom all family members "took their problems." She also was a frequent source of information about her famous father.

Robert Quigley King II served in World War I. He became an osteopath, graduating from the Kirksville College of Osteopathic Medicine. He practiced in Maitland, Missouri and Cushing, Oklahoma. His first wife, Margaret Isabel Moore, died on October 8, 1916. He then married Esther Harrison of Madison, Missouri, and had four children with her. He died June 5, 1931, in Rosedale Gardens, Michigan. His wife Esther died on June 29, 1951. David Bryant King took over the Maitland farm when he was eighteen and operated it for the rest of his life. He was always active in community affairs and was a member of Protective Credit Association and the Holt County Farm Bureau. He married Gladys Elizabeth McHenry of St. Joseph, Missouri. They had three sons. David Bryant King died on May 29, 1944, in a Maryville, Missouri, hospital. After the death of her husband, his widow Gladys inherited her husband's interests in the family's real estate holdings in Springfield, Ohio and brought a legal action that forced the sale of those interests. Gladys died January 5, 1955, in an automobile accident.

Miriam Danforth King married Ralph LeVerne Caywood, who was born in Maitland, Missouri, on May 3, 1891. They had three children, who were all born in Maitland. She lived for many years in Coral Gables, Florida, and did much to look after her mother in her mother's later years. Miriam died on March 28, 1957.

As was the case with Lettie Reed King, all of the Ward and Mary's children remained lifelong Presbyterians.

== Affairs of David Ward King in Springfield, Ohio ==
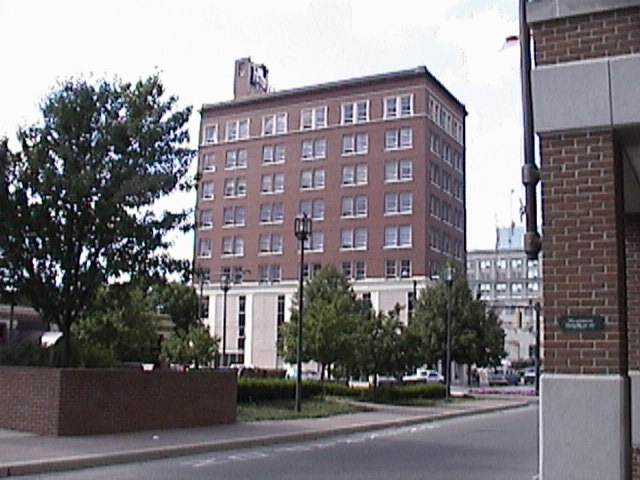
Arcue Building, 6 West High St.

Ward's mother, Harriet Adaline Danforth King, died on July 13, 1906, in Springfield, Ohio, after a lingering illness. Ward's father, Robert Quigley King, died suddenly on November 26, 1917, in his apartments in the King Building in Springfield. The Springfield newspaper reported his death with a lengthy front-page article that featured a large photo of him.

David Ward King and his brother, Robert Leffler King, inherited interests in their father's real estate holdings. Robert Quigley King had long owned the King Building, and there was a lot between it and High Street at the corner of Fountain and High in the very heart of downtown Springfield. At the time of his death, their father had begun building a new, very modern for its time, office building. Robert Quigley King's will left Ward and Leffler the King Building and this lot, subject to a one-third income interest in the profits from these properties to their sister Almena King Warrick for the rest of her life. He also left them some bonds in trust, which he instructed them to cash in and use to fund the building. The brothers worked together to complete that building after their father's death. At the suggestion of Leffler's wife, Lola Montez King, the brothers named this building the "Arcue" building which was the word form of "RQ" or "Robert Quigley". Leffler then managed this building for Ward until Ward's death and for Ward's heirs after his death.

Robert Quigley King gave his daughter Almena Warrick and her husband Harvey the right to live in his house at 642 North Wittenberg Avenue for life. This house is today owned by Wittenberg University. It is next door to the Wittenberg President's residence and is used as the university's guest house. Robert Quigley King also left his office building at 16 South Limestone Street in Springfield to his daughter Almena King Warrick and her husband Harvey for life. This building was in the heart of downtown Springfield as well and became the subject of a hard-fought lawsuit between the King and Warrick heirs after Almena's death, when King faction of heirs wanted to mortgage the property to improve that building so as to lease it to Montgomery Ward and the Warrick faction did not. The faction that wanted to mortgage and improve the building eventually won the suit.

There is no provision in the will of Robert Quigley King that mentions his Missouri farm or Grassland Farm, which probably means that he had given them outright during his life to his sons Ward and Leffler respectively. However, at the time of his father's death, Leffler had moved back to Springfield, leaving his son, Edwin Askam King in charge of Grassland Farm.

Ward's brother, Robert Leffler King, died after a long bout with diabetes at the Columbus home of his daughter, Jessie King Cave, on October 19, 1935. After Leffler's death, his son, Hamlin Caldwell King, managed the Arcue Building until its eventual sale. Leffer's son, Edwin Askam King, owned and operated Grassland Farm for the rest of his life.

The King family sold the building in the late forties, forced in a legal action by Gladys Elizabeth McHenry King, widow of David Ward King son David Bryant King. Even so, the Arcue Building still stands and is actively occupied today. It is still called the "Arcue Building" – even if no one remembers why. Long after the King family sold it, the King Building burned on September 15, 1956, in a spectacular fire that the history of the Springfield Fire Department mentions as one of the largest fires in the history of the city. There is today a vacant lot behind the Arcue Building where the King Building used to stand.

== Deaths of David Ward and Mary Wylie King ==
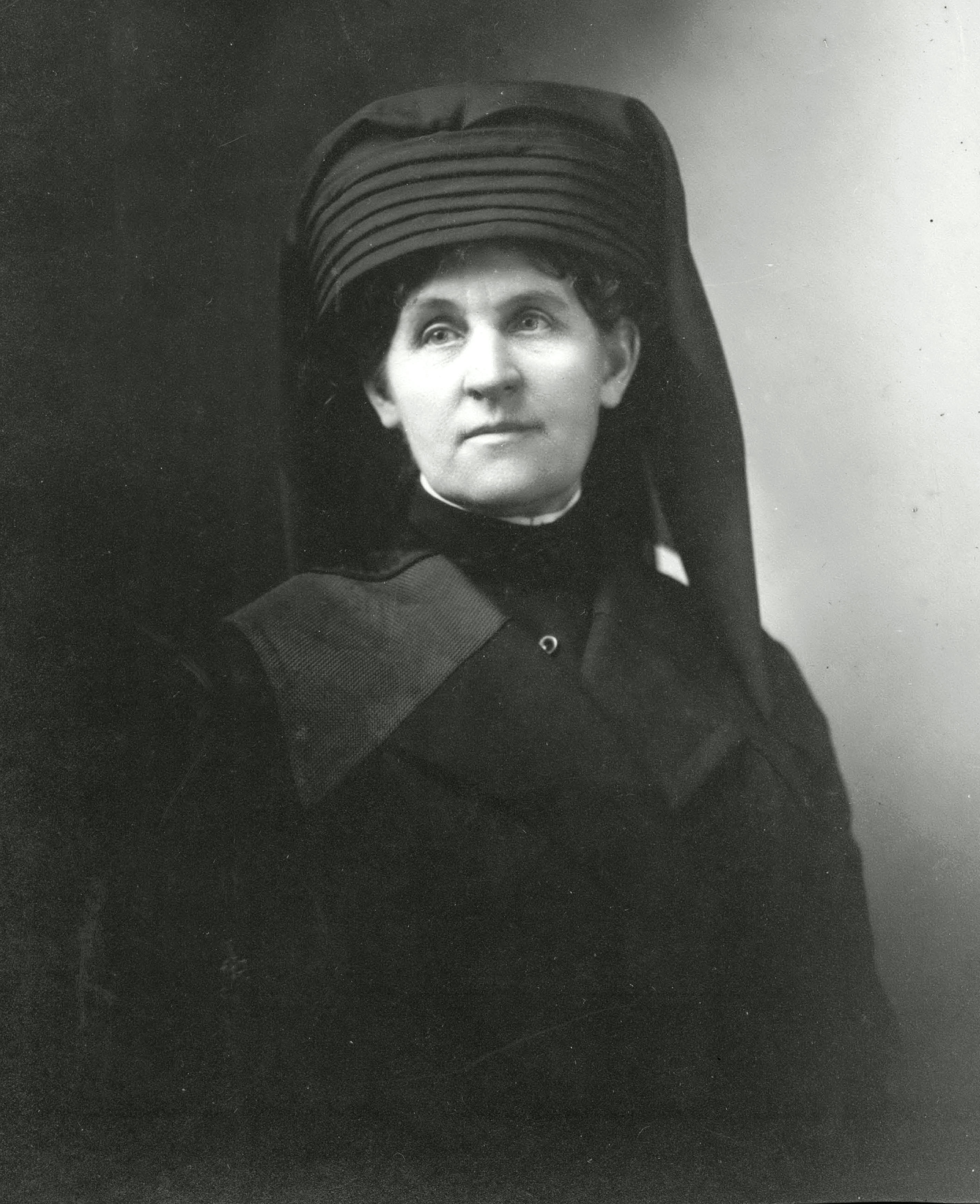
Mary Wylie Burbank King, in "widow's weeds", 1920.

David Ward King was for several years a director in the Federal Land Bank of St. Louis, Missouri. While he had been in ill health for several years, he had been able to keep up with his own affairs. He had just finished a board meeting when he suddenly died of a cerebral hemorrhage on February 9, 1920, at the Hotel Marquette in St. Louis. At the time of the death of David Ward King, "South America" was negotiating with the United States government to send him to South America on a campaign of good roads by dragging. Another man was sent in his place. Mary Wylie King died on October 12, 1945, at the home of her daughter, Miriam Danforth King Caywood, while moving furniture, in Coral Gables, Florida. They are both buried in Maitland, Missouri.

== Importance of the King Road Drag ==
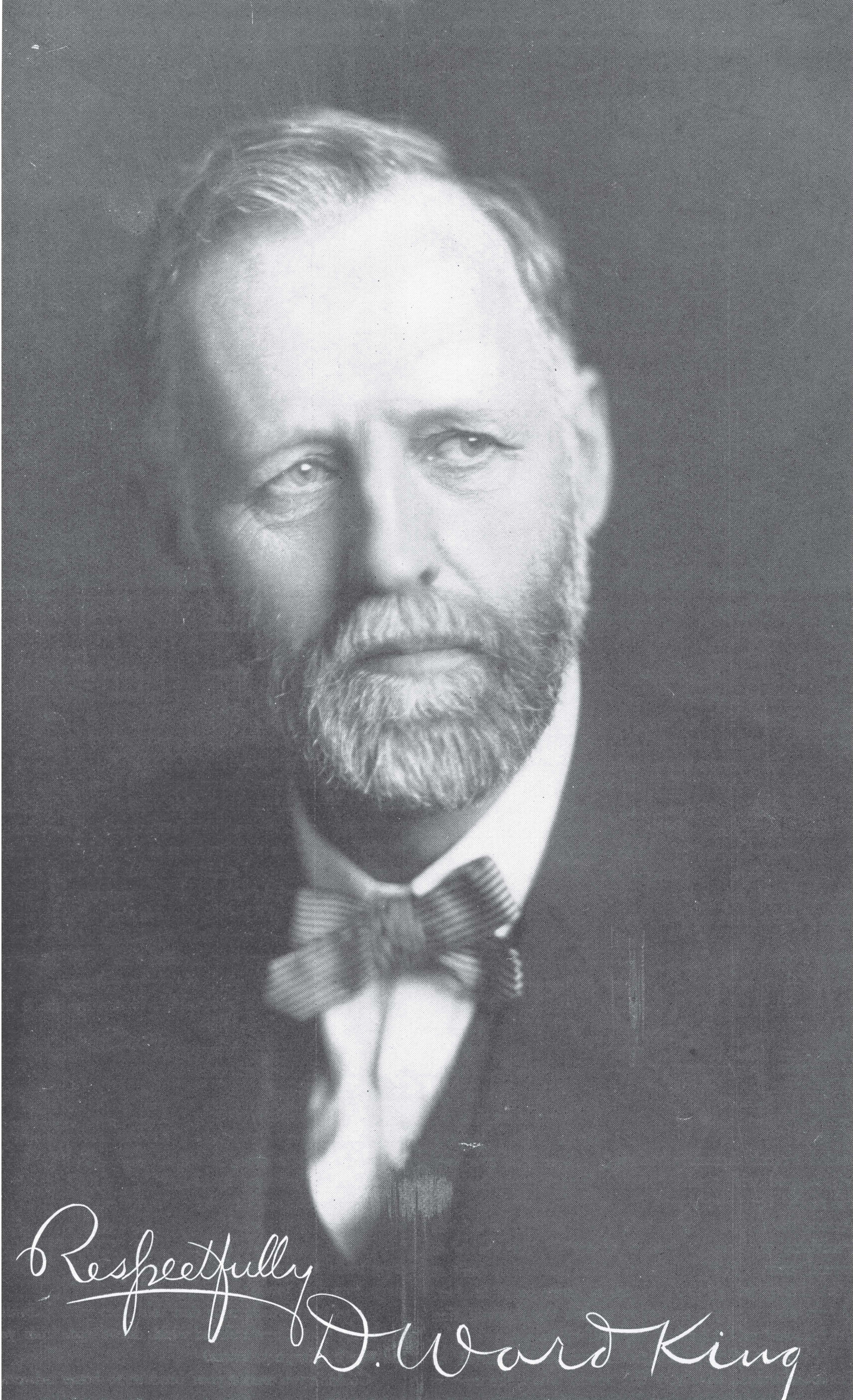
Signed photo of D. Ward King

D. Ward King was widely admired in his day. The improvement to roads his invention brought about benefitted nearly everyone in a highly visible and obvious way. The "before and after" contrast was dramatic. In fact, the widespread use of the King Road Drag came along near the time Henry Ford started mass-producing automobiles. Solid roads meant people could drive their Model T automobiles on the roads between cities. Solid rural roads also enabled reliable rural mail delivery, which promoted commerce in the United States between city and rural populations. For instance, it allowed Sears and Roebuck to send catalogues to small towns and farms, vastly increasing their customer base.

As a sign of how much Maitland revered his memory, there was a "gigantic maple tree" that was "situated on the lawn in a commanding position", which came to be designated the "King Memorial Tree." Years later, the Maitland-Skidmore Road was constructed through the lawn of the King farm. Its builders made a "jog" in the road around it to "preserve it as a memorial to the pioneer who cherished it from its infancy". Seventy years after Ward's death, "state scientists" were struggling to keep it alive after a particularly bad drought year. A history of Maitland said that "There are few trees in the state so admired and known." The Maitland, Missouri article on Wikipedia mentions itself as the home of D. Ward King.

The King Road Drag made possible the use of the motor vehicle and, ironically, the motor vehicle doomed the King Road Drag, at least in its horse-drawn form. The motor-powered road grader quickly rendered its horse-drawn predecessor obsolete. However, the road improvements brought about by the King Road Drag in its day enabled the subsequent advent of the automobile.
