= Sandra Postel =

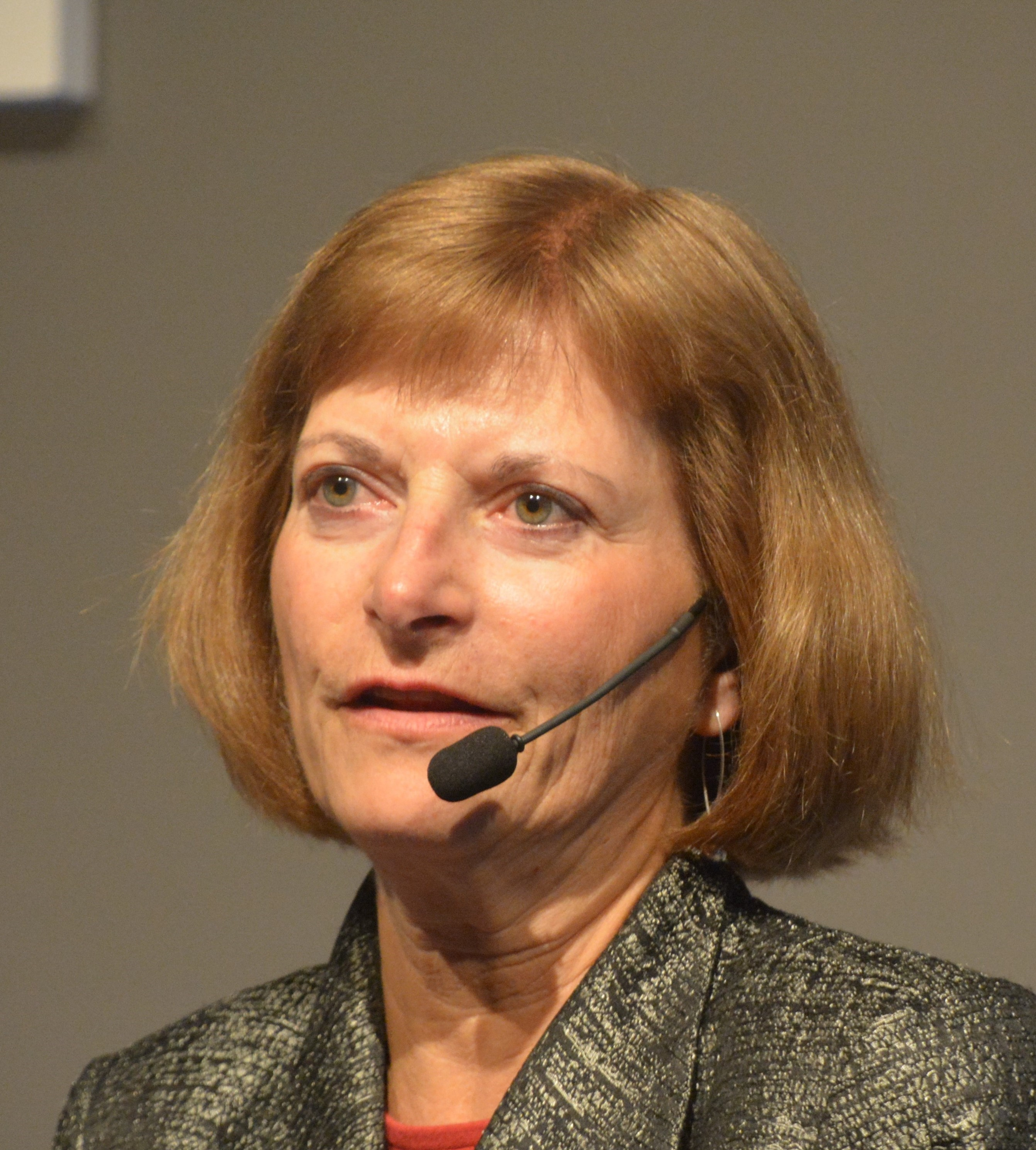
- Postel in February 2017
- Citizenship: American
- Education: Geology and Political Science, Wittenberg University, Environmental Management, Duke University
- Known for: Freshwater conservation and its sustainable use.
- Awards: Stockholm Water Prize, 2021
- Scientific career
- Fields: Freshwater conservationist
- Workplaces: Global Water Policy Project

Sandra Postel is the founding director of the Global Water Policy Project. She is a world expert on fresh water and related ecosystems. From 2009-2015, she served as Freshwater Fellow of the National Geographic Society. She is the author of scores of articles and several books on global freshwater issues, including Last Oasis, which appears in eight languages, and most recently Replenish: The Virtuous Cycle of Water and Prosperity. She is the recipient of four honorary doctor of science degrees. From 1988 to 1994 she served as the Vice President for Research at the Worldwatch Institute. Postel has taught water policy courses at Tufts University and Mount Holyoke College. In 2002, Scientific American magazine named her as one of their "Scientific American 50" to recognize her contribution to science and technology. Postel's work aims to build a more water-secure world for all earthly beings. In 2021, Postel was awarded the Stockholm Water Prize, often described as the Nobel Prize for water.

== Overview ==
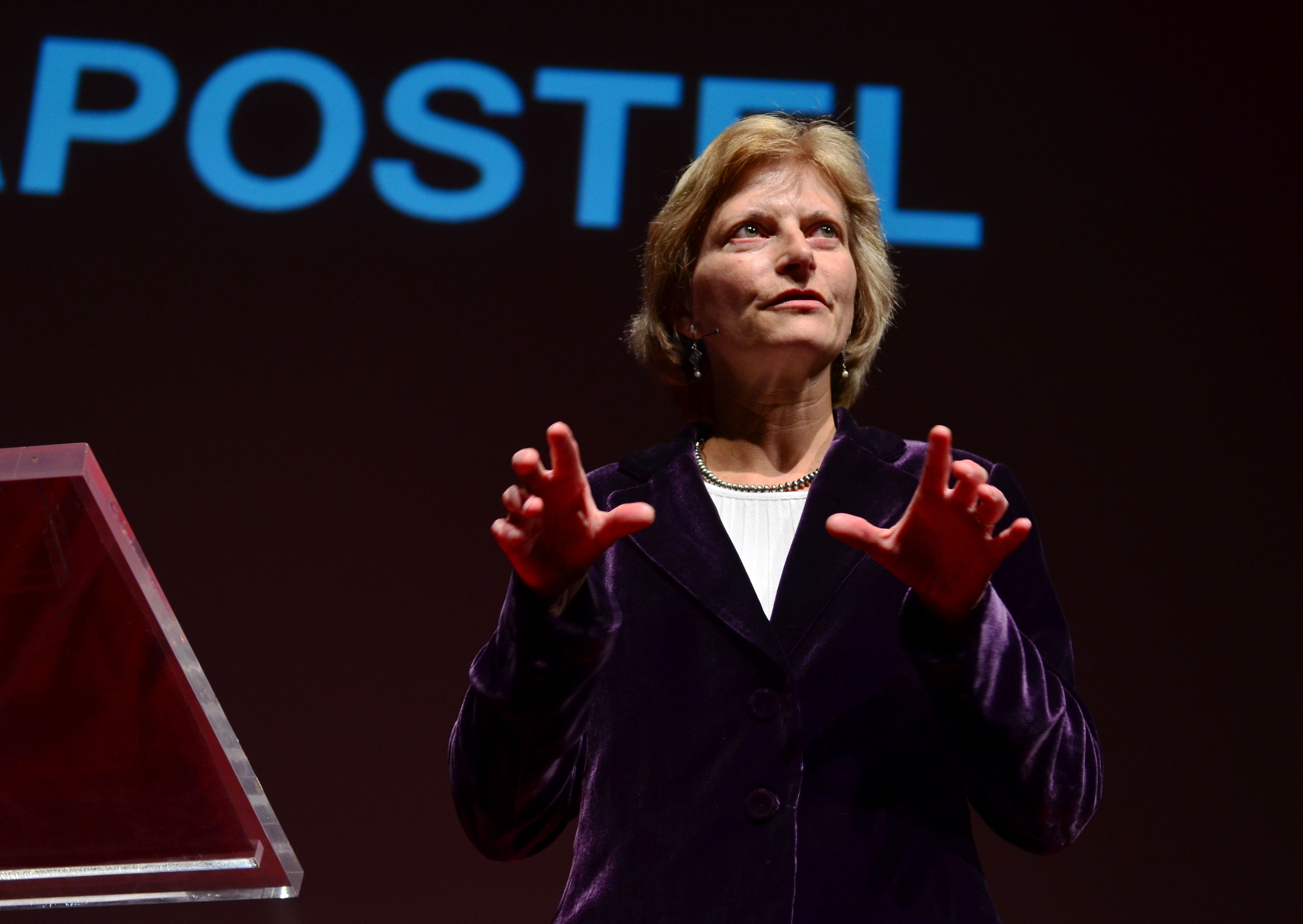
Postel speaking at TEDx

After graduate school, Postel worked as a natural resources consultant with a private firm in Menlo Park, California. In 1983 she joined the Worldwatch Institute, where she assumed the global water portfolio. From 1988 to 1994 she served as Vice President for Research. She left the Worldwatch Institute in 1994, moved to Massachusetts, and founded the Global Water Policy Project, which continues to serve as the umbrella for Postel's research, writing, speaking and consulting. In 2009, she was appointed Freshwater Fellow of the National Geographic Society, a position she held through 2015. She now lives in the Rio Grande Valley of New Mexico.

== Awards ==
Scientific American 50. Postel was honored for promoting "sweeping changes aimed at preserving the world's dwindling supplies of freshwater." In 2021, Postel won the Stockholm Water Prize, jointly awarded by Swedish Royal Academy of the Sciences and Stockholm International Water Institute (SIWI). According to the prize committee “no one has exhibited more commitment, capacity, courage, and perseverance to address far-ranging and critical water issues. Her work has been instrumental in shifting both public and professional awareness about the water crisis.”

== Bibliography ==
- Last Oasis: Facing Water Scarcity, W.W. Norton & Co., 1992. ISBN 0-393-31744-7
- Pillar of Sand: Can the Irrigation Miracle Last?, W.W. Norton & Co., 1999. ISBN 0-393-31937-7
- Rivers for Life: Managing Water for People and Nature, (with Brian Richter), Island Press, 2003. ISBN 1-55963-444-8
- Replenish: The Virtuous Cycle of Water and Prosperity, Island Press, 2017.
