= Helen Bosart Morgan Wagstaff =

American sculptor

Helen Bosart Morgan Wagstaff (1902–1986) was an American sculptor who explored both abstract and figural subjects in her work. She was a founding member and the first president of the Springfield Art Association, now the Springfield Museum of Art in Springfield, Ohio.

== Life and education ==
Helen Bosart was born in Springfield on October 17, 1902. She was the daughter of Dr. Harley John Bosart and Mary Ellen (Grove) Bosart. She had one sister, Pauline (Bosart) Schaefer. In 1923, she graduated from Wittenberg University where she studied art. She continued her education at the Chicago Art Institute and the Dayton Art Institute. She married her first husband, Dr. J. Wayland Morgan in 1930. He was a professor of advanced chemistry at Wittenberg from 1928 to 1953. Following his passing in 1969, Bosart Morgan would remarry eight years later on September 17, 1977, to Edwin M. Wagstaff. While she never had children of her own, she did have three step-children. She died in Lake Wales, Florida at her winter home on January 13, 1986, at 83 years of age and was buried at Ferncliff Cemetery.

== Career ==
Bosart Morgan Wagstaff was an active participant of the professional art world. Throughout her career, her work was featured in several exhibitions and was collected by many. In 1972, she was the subject of a solo exhibition at the Springfield Art Center, now the Springfield Museum of Art in Springfield, OH. According to Jim Hays of the Springfield News-Sun, she "submitted nearly 90 pieces, carefully culled from her production of several decades, for the [representative] exhibit." While this retrospective focused primarily on her sculpture work, her paintings in oil and watercolor were on view as well. In addition to showing her work in Ohio, Bosart Morgan Wagstaff exhibited in New York City, Syracuse, N.Y., and Wichita, KS. Biographical records in the archives of the Springfield Museum of Art describe her work being in the collections of the Cincinnati Museum of Art and the Butler Institute of American Art.

Not only did Bosart Morgan Wagstaff exhibit her work, she contributed to several organizations as well. She was a member of the National Association of Women Artists and "a fellow of the International Institute of ATT Arts and Letters in Switzerland." She was also listed in Who's Who of American Art, a directory of contemporary American artists with notable significance. In 1946, she became a founding member of the Springfield Art Association and would become its first president when it was incorporated in 1952.

== Artwork ==
Bosart Morgan Wagstaff worked in a variety of media though her primary focus was in sculpture. She explored a wide range of materials including "lead, limestone, marble, terra-cotta, iron, bronze, wood, and aluminum." An example of her work can be found at Wittenberg University in front of the science building. Interaction was commissioned by the class of 1967 and celebrates the intersection of math, science, and religion on campus.

In addition to her sculptural work, Wagstaff also experimented with oil, watercolor, ink, and charcoal.
