= Bill Martin (athletic director) =

William C. Martin is an American former college athletics administrator. He was athletic director at the University of Michigan from 2000 to 2010.

Martin is a first generation American who was born and raised in Detroit, Michigan. He holds a BA degree from Wittenberg College, a graduate degree in economics from the Stockholm University, and an MBA from the University of Michigan.

Martin founded the First Martin Corporation in 1968, a diversified real estate development company based in Ann Arbor, Michigan. In 1996, he founded the Bank of Ann Arbor and serves as its Chair. Martin has taught economics at Muskingum College, Eastern Michigan University, and the Ross School of Business at the University of Michigan. In 2000, Martin was tapped to be the tenth athletic director of the University of Michigan and served in that capacity for ten years.

His public service includes serving as President of the Washtenaw Land Conservancy, Ann Arbor Public Schools Foundation Board and Wittenberg University Board. The Ann Arbor News has recognized Martin as the Citizen of the Year. In 2016, Martin was tapped by Michigan Governor Rick Snyder to be a member of the State Commission overseeing the finances of both the City of Detroit and the Detroit School System.

As a lifelong sailor, Martin was President of the United States Sailing Association, the governing body for the sport. He has also served as a board member and President of the United States Olympic Committee (USOC) receiving its highest honor, the General Douglas MacArthur Award. Currently, Martin is active on the board of the National Football Foundation (NFF). In 2008 Martin was named Athletic Director of the Year by the Dodd Foundation. In 2017, Martin was inducted into the National Sailing Hall of Fame.
