= Global Water Policy Project =

American environmental organization

The Global Water Policy Project (GWPP) was founded by Sandra Postel in 1994. Its aim is to promote the preservation of Earth's freshwater through research, writing, outreach and public speaking.

The GWPP is based in New Mexico, in the southwestern United States.

== See also ==
- Category:Water resource policy
- Sustainability
- Biodiversity
- Global warming
- Ecology
- Earth Science
- Natural environment
