= National Register of Historic Places listings in Clark County, Ohio =

Location of Clark County in Ohio

This is a list of the National Register of Historic Places listings in Clark County, Ohio.

This is intended to be a complete list of the properties and districts on the National Register of Historic Places in Clark County, Ohio, United States. The locations of National Register properties and districts for which the latitude and longitude coordinates are included below, may be seen in an online map.

There are 43 properties and districts listed on the National Register in the county.

This National Park Service list is complete through NPS recent listings posted June 6, 2026.

== Current listings ==
	Name on the Register	Image	Date listed	Location	City or town	Description
1	Arcade Hotel	Arcade Hotel	October 16, 1974 (#74001410)	Fountain Ave. and High St. 39°55′21″N 83°48′36″W	Springfield	demolished 1988 and a Courtyard by Marriott erected in its place
2	Francis Bookwalter House	Francis Bookwalter House	January 3, 1980 (#80002954)	611 S. Fountain Ave. 39°55′02″N 83°48′40″W	Springfield	
3	Brewer Log House	Brewer Log House	August 13, 1974 (#74001411)	2665 Old Springfield Rd., south of Springfield; 39°51′03″N 83°45′53″W	Green Township	
4	David Crabill House	David Crabill House	October 10, 1975 (#75001341)	5 mi (8.0 km) east of Springfield off State Route 4; 39°57′39″N 83°44′52″W	Moorefield Township	
5	East High Street District	East High Street District	October 9, 1974 (#74001412)	Roughly bounded by E. High, S. Sycamore, and Walnut Sts. 39°55′18″N 83°47′48″W	Springfield	
6	Enon Mound	Enon Mound	February 23, 1972 (#72001005)	Mound Circle in central Enon; 39°52′46″N 83°55′54″W	Enon	Probably built by the Adena culture.
7	Green Plain Monthly Meetinghouse	Green Plain Monthly Meetinghouse	April 1, 1982 (#82003551)	Clifton Rd., southwest of South Charleston; 39°48′35″N 83°41′28″W	Madison Township	
8	Daniel Hertzler House	Daniel Hertzler House	February 7, 1978 (#78002018)	West of Springfield off State Route 4; 39°54′33″N 83°54′40″W	Bethel Township	
9	Kenton-Hunt Farm	Kenton-Hunt Farm	February 8, 1980 (#80002955)	North of Springfield at 4690 Urbana Rd. 39°59′33″N 83°48′13″W	Moorefield Township	
10	Lagonda Club Building	Lagonda Club Building	May 28, 1975 (#75001342)	Northwestern corner of High and Spring Sts. 39°55′24″N 83°48′25″W	Springfield	
11	Lagonda National Bank	Lagonda National Bank	July 3, 2017 (#100001267)	2 E. Main St. 39°55′29″N 83°48′36″W	Springfield	
12	Main Street Buildings	Main Street Buildings	March 2, 1979 (#79001790)	6-14 E. Main St. 39°55′28″N 83°48′35″W	Springfield	
13	Marquart-Mercer Farm	Marquart-Mercer Farm	July 26, 1979 (#79001791)	Southwest of Springfield; 39°51′21″N 83°49′47″W	Mad River Township	
14	Masonic Temple	Masonic Temple	December 17, 2008 (#08001195)	125 W. High St. 39°55′24″N 83°48′48″W	Springfield	
15	Mast Castle		May 1, 2026 (#100012954)	901 West High Street; 39°55′27″N 83°49′34″W	Springfield	
16	Municipal Building	Municipal Building	May 25, 1973 (#73001394)	S. Fountain Ave. between High and Washington Sts. 39°55′23″N 83°48′40″W	Springfield	
17	Myers Daily Market		February 14, 2018 (#100002119)	101 S. Fountain Ave. 39°55′23″N 83°48′38″W	Springfield	
18	Myers Hall	Myers Hall	June 30, 1975 (#75001343)	Wittenberg Ave. and Ward St. 39°56′05″N 83°48′50″W	Springfield	
19	Newlove Works	Newlove Works	June 4, 1973 (#73001395)	Along Newlove Road in Section 29 of Harmony Township; 39°55′11″N 83°40′18″W	Harmony Township	
20	Odd Fellows' Home for Orphans, Indigent and Aged	Odd Fellows' Home for Orphans, Indigent and Aged	April 16, 1980 (#80002956)	404 E. McCreight Ave. 39°56′18″N 83°48′06″W	Springfield	
21	Old Enon Road Stone Arch Culvert	Old Enon Road Stone Arch Culvert	April 16, 2009 (#09000209)	Rocky Point Rd., approximately 185 feet west of Old Mill Rd. 39°52′10″N 83°52′46″W	Mad River Township	
22	Olive Branch High School	Olive Branch High School	July 23, 2009 (#09000563)	9710 W. National Rd., southeast of New Carlisle; 39°54′48″N 83°59′36″W	Bethel Township	
23	Ollie's Tavern	Ollie's Tavern	January 25, 1997 (#96001619)	10516 Marquart Rd., north of New Carlisle; 39°58′59″N 84°00′08″W	Pike Township	
24	Pennsylvania House	Pennsylvania House	April 11, 1973 (#73001396)	1311 W. Main St. 39°55′32″N 83°49′58″W	Springfield	
25	Pickaway Settlements Battlesite	Pickaway Settlements Battlesite	May 8, 1980 (#80002953)	North of Enon; 39°54′27″N 83°55′15″W	Bethel Township	
26	Pringle-Patric House	Pringle-Patric House	December 15, 1997 (#97001547)	1314-1316 E. High St. 39°55′16″N 83°47′24″W	Springfield	
27	C.A. Reeser House	C.A. Reeser House	June 20, 1980 (#80002957)	1425 Innisfallen Ave. 39°54′51″N 83°50′07″W	Springfield	Destroyed
28	St. John's Evangelical Lutheran Church	St. John's Evangelical Lutheran Church	June 7, 2006 (#06000485)	27 N. Wittenberg Ave. 39°55′33″N 83°48′51″W	Springfield	
29	St. Joseph Roman Catholic Church	St. Joseph Roman Catholic Church	March 15, 1982 (#82003552)	802 Kenton St. 39°54′57″N 83°47′52″W	Springfield	
30	St. Raphael Church	St. Raphael Church	June 22, 1976 (#76001381)	225 E. High St. 39°55′22″N 83°48′23″W	Springfield	
31	Shawnee Hotel	Shawnee Hotel	December 5, 1985 (#85003044)	Main and Limestone Sts. 39°55′29″N 83°48′30″W	Springfield	
32	South Charleston Historic District	South Charleston Historic District	July 17, 1978 (#78002017)	Centered on Jamestown and Chillicothe Sts. 39°49′30″N 83°38′04″W	South Charleston	
33	South Fountain Avenue Historic District	South Fountain Avenue Historic District	December 29, 1983 (#83004114)	Roughly Fountain Ave. and Limestone St. from Perrin to Monroe Sts. 39°54′53″N 83°48′40″W	Springfield	
34	Springfield Country Club		October 30, 2023 (#100009480)	2315 Signal Hill Rd; 39°57′19″N 83°48′37″W	Springfield	
35	Springfield Downtown Historic District		January 25, 2021 (#100006049)	Roughly bounded by Columbia, Fountain, Main, and Limestone streets 39°55′30″N 83°48′33″W	Springfield	
36	Springfield Metallic Casket Company	Springfield Metallic Casket Company	February 23, 2016 (#16000040)	105 N. Center St. 39°55′36″N 83°48′43″W	Springfield	
37	Tecumseh Building	Tecumseh Building	December 28, 2000 (#00001555)	34 W. High St. 39°55′25″N 83°48′42″W	Springfield	
38	Third Presbyterian Church	Third Presbyterian Church	January 3, 1980 (#80002958)	714 N. Limestone St. 39°55′58″N 83°48′20″W	Springfield	
39	Thomas Manufacturing Company Warehouse	Thomas Manufacturing Company Warehouse	February 2, 2001 (#01000055)	360 S. Limestone St. 39°55′12″N 83°48′30″W	Springfield	
40	Warder Public Library	Warder Public Library	February 17, 1978 (#78002019)	E. High and Spring Sts. 39°55′21″N 83°48′26″W	Springfield	A gift of local businessman Benjamin Warder, it now houses the Warder Literacy Center after the main branch of Clark County Public Library was moved to a modern facility in 1989.
41	Westcott House	Westcott House	July 24, 1974 (#74001413)	1340 E. High St. 39°55′17″N 83°47′21″W	Springfield	The only Frank Lloyd Wright-designed Prairie School house in Ohio
42	Wittenberg University Historic District	Wittenberg University Historic District	March 4, 2014 (#14000040)	Roughly bounded by Bill Edwards Dr., N. Fountain, W. Ward, and Plum; 39°56′03″N 83°48′47″W	Springfield	
43	Edward Wren Company Building	Edward Wren Company Building	December 13, 2016 (#16000844)	31-37 High St. 39°55′23″N 83°48′32″W	Springfield	

== See also ==
- List of National Historic Landmarks in Ohio
- Listings in neighboring counties: Champaign, Greene, Madison, Miami, Montgomery
- National Register of Historic Places listings in Ohio
