= Mercer House =

Mercer House, Mercer Hall, and variations, may refer to:

== United States ==
- Mercer House (Savannah, Georgia)
- Mercer House (Princeton, New Jersey) – Opus Dei residence and former location of the murder of Cissy Stuart
- Buck-Mercer House, Somerset, Kentucky
- Mercer Union Meetinghouse, Mercer, Maine
- Mercer House (Natchez, Mississippi)
- Dr. Samuel D. Mercer House, Omaha, Nebraska
- Mercer Log House, Fairborn, Ohio
- Marquart-Mercer Farm, Springfield, Ohio
- Fonthill, Mercer Museum and Moravian Pottery and Tile Works, Doylestown, Pennsylvania
- Mercer Hall, Columbia, Tennessee

== Australia ==
- Mercer House, a now defunct teachers' college in Victoria, Australia

== See also ==
- Greek Revival Houses of Mercer County: Lynnwood, Walnut Hall, Glenworth, Harrodsburg, Kentucky, listed on the NRHP in Mercer County, Kentucky
