= Buck Creek State Park =

State park of Ohio, United States

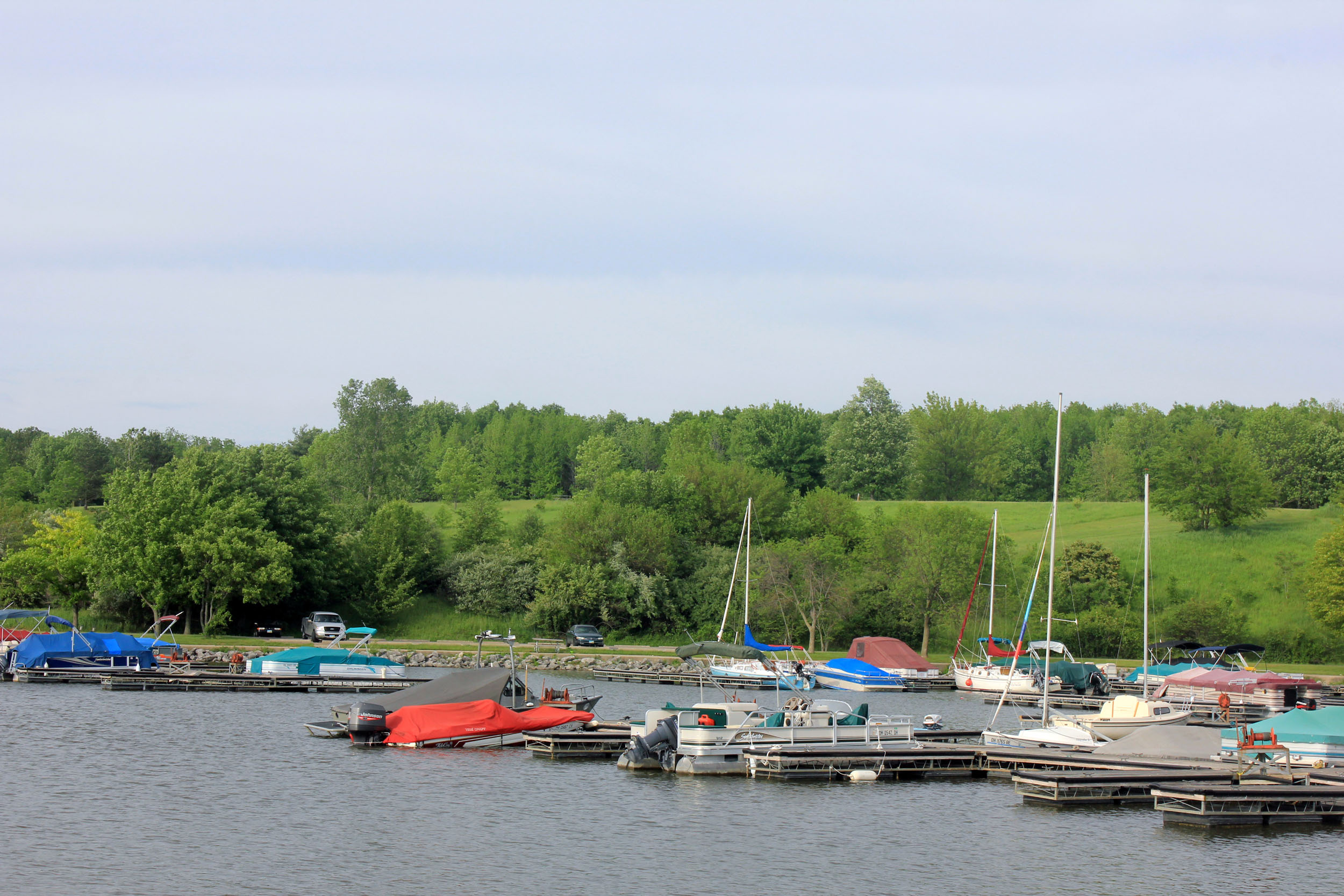
- Buck Creek State Park marina

- Location within Ohio Location within the United States
- Location: Clark County, Ohio, United States
- Coordinates: 40°00′02″N 83°42′28″W
- Area: Land: 1,596 acres (646 ha); Water: 2,120 acres (860 ha)
- Elevation: 1,020 ft (310 m)
- Established: 1975
- Administrator: Ohio Department of Natural Resources
- Designation: Ohio state park
- Website: Buck Creek State Park

Buck Creek State Park is a 4,016-acre (1,625 ha) public recreation area in Clark County, Ohio, in the United States, that is leased by the state of Ohio from the U.S. Army Corps of Engineers. The state park's main feature is the C. J. Brown Reservoir, a flood control reservoir created by the USACE on Buck Creek (or Lagonda Creek) as part of a flood control system in the Ohio River drainage basin. The park offers year-round recreation including camping, boating, hunting, fishing, swimming, picnicking, and hiking.

== History ==
=== Indian wars ===
The land in and around Buck Creek State Park was inhabited by various Indian tribes prior to settlement by American pioneers. As happened all over the Ohio Country white settlers from the east sought to drive the Indians from the land. One of the first major conflicts in Clark County happened in 1780 when George Rogers Clark led a group of some 1,000 men from Kentucky in an attack against the Indians in Ohio. This attack forced the Shawnee to abandon their camp near what is now Xenia. They fled Old Chillicothe for Piqua near the present site of Springfield and Buck Creek State Park. Clark pursued the Shawnee and defeated them at the Battle of Piqua. Many of the Shawnee were not killed in the battle and managed to escape into the woodlands. Tecumseh was one of those Indians and he vowed to gain vengeance on Clark and his fellow attackers. George R. Clark, Joe Williams and their men did not hold the land they gained in the battle. They retreated back to Kentucky and the Shawnee built a new Piqua on the banks of the Miami River. Hostilities between whites and Indians were at a brief standstill in the area of Buck Creek and the Mad River.

=== Pioneer settlers ===
Clark County was safely opened to settlement by whites following the Battle of Fallen Timbers and resulting Treaty of Greenville when the Wyandot, Lenape, Shawnee, Ottawa, Chippewa, Potawatomi, Miami, Wea, Kickapoo and Kaskaskia tribes surrendered their claims to the land in what would become Ohio, Indiana and Illinois. Simon Kenton led a group of six Kentucky families into the area of Buck Creek and the Mad River. This group of settlers remained at the confluence of Buck Creek and the Mad River for two years before moving elsewhere. Kenton would then build a home along Buck Creek north of present-day Springfield. Kenton and following settlers began clearing land for farming. The fallen trees were used to build homes and barns.

Settlers quickly moved into the area and farmed the fertile land. Springfield was established in 1801 and was named the county seat of Clark County. Markets to the east and west were opened to the Buck Creek State Park area in 1840 with the completion of the National Road, now U.S. Route 40. Springfield transformed from an agriculture based community to an industrial center. In fact the city led the nation in the production of farming tools.

=== C. J. Brown Reservoir ===
C. J. Brown Reservoir and Dam is named for Clarence J. Brown who was the State Statistician of Ohio and published several newspapers at the president of the Brown Publishing Company. Brown was also the Lieutenant Governor of Ohio from 1919 to 1923, the Ohio Secretary of State from 1927 to 1933, was the Republican nominee for governor in 1934 and finally served in the U.S. House of Representatives from 1939 until his death in 1965. The House of Representatives named the dam project in his honor with a bipartisan resolution.

The dam was built across Buck Creek to control flooding in the Ohio River basin. It is made of rock fill with a sand and gravel core. It measures 6,620 feet (2,020 m) across and 72 feet (22 m) high. The reservoir covers 2,120 acres (860 ha) with a drainage area of 83 square miles (21,000 ha).

=== Crabill Homestead ===
The Crabill Homestead, which is listed on the National Register of Historic Places, is on the west shore of the reservoir within Buck Creek State Park. The homestead was settled in 1813 by David and Barbara Crabill who arrived in the area on a Conestoga wagon from Virginia. The home is a two-story Federal style house that is surrounded by various outbuildings. The homestead remained in the family until the early 1900s when it was left unoccupied until 1971. Slated for demolition with the construction of the dam, it was acquired by the Clark County Historical Society which restored the property and opened it to public. The homestead was acquired in 2010 by the George Rogers Clark Heritage Association of Clark County, which offers tours seasonally.

== Natural history ==
Buck Creek State Park is located in an area of moraines, which are low hills that were built as the glaciers receded over 12,000 years ago. They are made of gravel and sand that piled up as the pace of glacial retreat changed over the course of time. Ancient streams were covered by sand and gravel deposited by the retreating glaciers. These streams are now springs. The springs form the numerous bogs and fens that are found throughout Clark and Champaign counties.

The bogs and fens are home to a variety of rare and unusual plant species including horned bladderwort and round-leaved sundew. Also found in the park is the spotted turtle which is endangered in Ohio. Buck Creek State Park is also home to many migrating waterfowl species and some rare songbirds including, Henslow's sparrows, dickcissels, and bobolinks.

More than 4,000 acres (1,600 ha) of land are protected at Buck Creek State Park. Early settlers to the area described this land as being a prairie or wet prairie. The soil was very fertile and most of it was converted into farmland. Not all of the land was farmed and it was left in its natural state in isolated patches. The U.S. Army Corps of Engineers and Ohio Department of Natural Resources have been able to use seeds from these patches to restore the prairie to some of the land at Buck Creek State Park. A large restored area is below the dam at the park. The 40-acre (16 ha) field has nest boxes that attract tree swallows and eastern bluebirds. Non-native and invasive plant species are managed by hand pulling, cutting, mowing, burning and spraying projects. Seeds from the native plants are gathered in autumn and planted in spring in an ongoing effort to restore the area to a natural prairie environment.

== Recreation ==
The park offers swimming, fishing, camping, cabins, boating, 5.5 miles (8.9 km) of hiking trails, 7.5 miles (12.1 km) of bridle trails, winter recreation, and seasonal hunting. Common game fish include walleye, white bass, and crappie.
