= Pringle-Patric House =

Coordinates: 39.924°N 83.786°W

- Pringle–Patric House
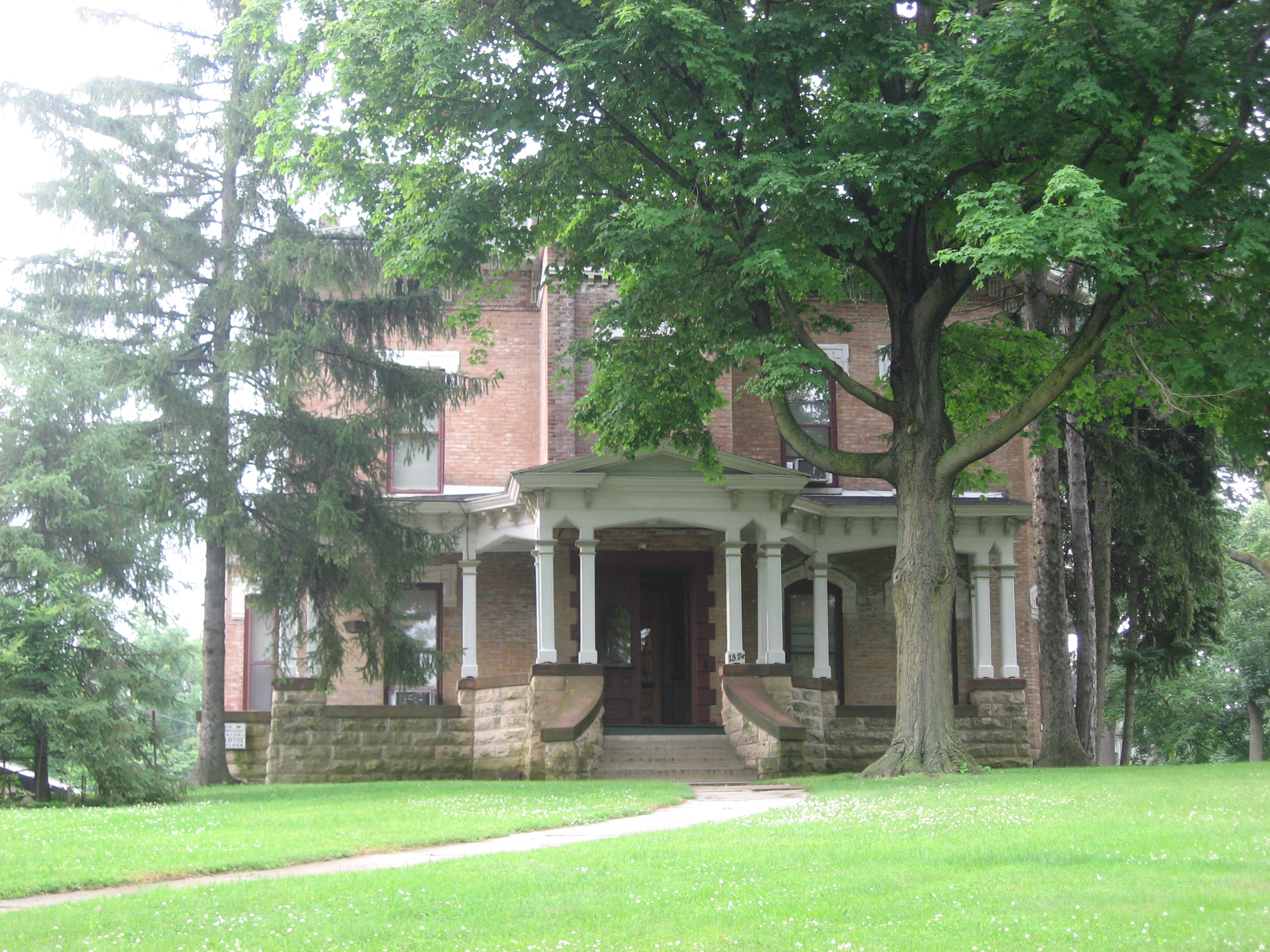
- Front façade of the Pringle–Patric House

- Location within Ohio Location within the United States
- Location: 1316 East High Street, Springfield, Ohio, United States
- Built: 1877
- Architectural style: Italianate

The Pringle–Patric House is a historic residence located in Springfield, Ohio, United States. Constructed in 1877, the house is an example of Italianate architecture, a style widely used in American domestic design during the nineteenth century.

== History ==
The house was built in 1877 during a period of economic growth in Springfield, Ohio, associated with industrial expansion and urban development.

It was originally constructed as a private residence and is associated with the Pringle and later the Patric families, from whom it derives its name.

In the late twentieth century, the building was adaptively reused for community purposes, including use as a women’s shelter.

== Architecture ==
The Pringle–Patric House reflects the characteristics of Italianate architecture, including:

- Low-pitched roof
- Wide overhanging eaves with decorative brackets
- Tall, narrow windows
- Vertical emphasis in façade design
- Brick construction

These features were influenced by nineteenth-century architectural pattern books.

== Significance ==
The house represents the architectural character of late nineteenth-century residential development in Springfield, Ohio, and reflects broader trends in middle-class housing and urban growth.

== Preservation and current use ==
The building has been preserved and repurposed for community use, demonstrating adaptive reuse of historic residential structures.

== See also ==
- National Register of Historic Places listings in Clark County, Ohio
- Italianate architecture in the United States
