= Tecumseh Building =

- U.S. National Register of Historic Places
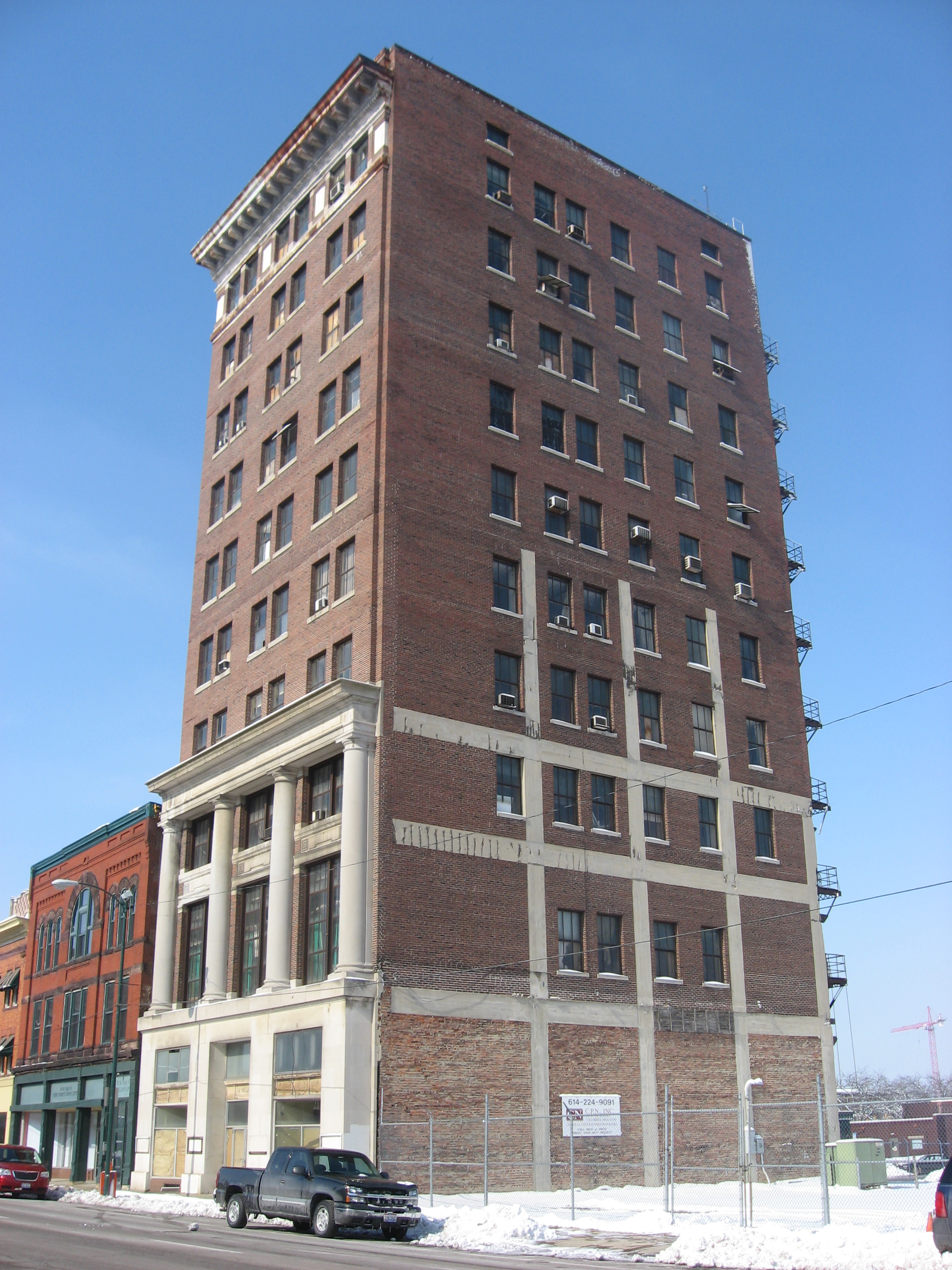
- Tecumseh Building

- Location within Ohio Location within the United States
- Location: 34 W. High St., Springfield, Ohio
- Coordinates: 39°55′24.8″N 83°48′42″W
- Area: 0.6 acres (0.24 ha)
- Built: 1922
- Architect: W.E. Russ; J.A. Poss
- Architectural style: Early Commercial
- NRHP reference No.: 00001555
- Added to NRHP: December 28, 2000

The Tecumseh Building, also known as the Francis J. Drolla Building, is a historic building in downtown Springfield, Ohio, United States. Located at 34 West High Street, it was designed by J.A. Poss and W.E. Russ and is described as being an example of "Early Commercial" architecture. It was added to the National Register of Historic Places in 2000 for its architectural significance.

== See also ==
- National Register of Historic Places listings in Clark County, Ohio
