= St. John's Evangelical Lutheran Church (Springfield, Ohio) =

Historic church in Ohio, United States

- U.S. National Register of Historic Places
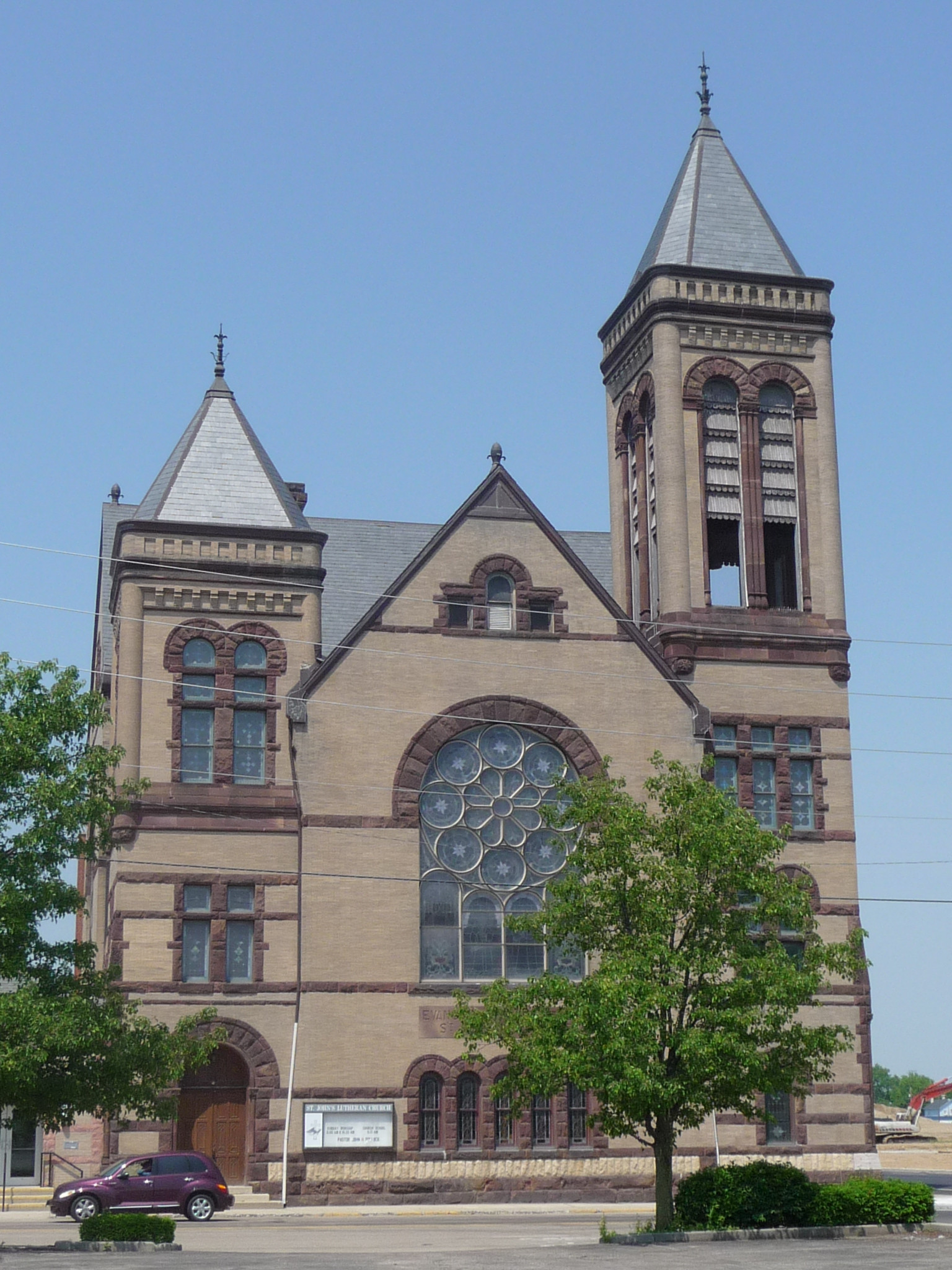
- Eastern facade

- Location within Ohio Location within the United States
- Location: 27 N. Wittenberg Ave., Springfield, Ohio
- Coordinates: 39°55′33″N 83°48′52″W
- Area: Less than 1 acre (0.40 ha)
- Built: 1897
- Architect: Charles A. Cregar
- Architectural style: Romanesque Revival
- NRHP reference No.: 06000485
- Added to NRHP: June 7, 2006

St. John's Evangelical Lutheran Church is a historic Lutheran church in downtown Springfield, Ohio, United States. Founded as a German-speaking parish in Springfield's early days, it grew rapidly during its first few decades, and its present large church building was constructed in the 1890s under the direction of one of Springfield's leading architects. The congregation remains in the landmark church building, which has been named a historic site.

== Early history ==
Springfield's First Lutheran congregation was organized in May 1841, and a separate group of German Lutherans began meeting soon afterward. After a period of worshipping in the county courthouse and in various rented properties, the group was formally organized in 1845 with a charter membership of seventy-five. A number of short-tenured ministers served the congregation, with six in succession over forty years, but by the 1880s the congregation's roll had approximately four hundred names, and its property was valued at $20,000. As the congregation continued to grow, the present church building was erected; the cornerstone was laid on November 3, 1895, and the finished building was consecrated on April 26, 1897. By 1908, the church property was valued at $50,000, and the membership had grown from four hundred individuals to four hundred and fifty families. This growth was accompanied by linguistic change: many members still worshipped in German, but English services had also begun by this time, facilitated by a minister who was fluent in both languages.

== Architecture ==
Designed by Charles A. Cregar, one of Springfield's most prominent architects, St. John's is a Romanesque Revival structure with a prominent corner tower. Although built primarily of brick, the walls also feature copious amounts of limestone and other types of stone. Asphalt is used for the roof, while the foundation is composed of a mix of sandstone and other types of stone. The main entrance is placed at the base of the tower, which features narrow arched windows on three stories below the tall louvering that shelters the belfry. Because the church sits on a street corner, two different sides of the building include massive gabled sections, each rising above groups of small windows. The building's two largest windows are found in these gables; both are far taller and broader than any door and any other window in the structure.

== Recent history ==
St. John's remains an active congregation of the Evangelical Lutheran Church in America, conducting activities such as ministry to the poor, inter-church events, and day care service out of its 1897 church building. In 2006, the church was listed on the National Register of Historic Places, qualifying because of its historically significant architecture. It is one of six Cregar-designed buildings listed on the Register, along with St. Joseph's Catholic Church, the former Arcade Hotel, the former Municipal Building, the former Third Presbyterian Church, and St. Raphael's Catholic Church.
