= St. Raphael's Catholic Church (Springfield, Ohio) =

Historic church in Ohio, United States

- St. Raphael Church
- U.S. National Register of Historic Places
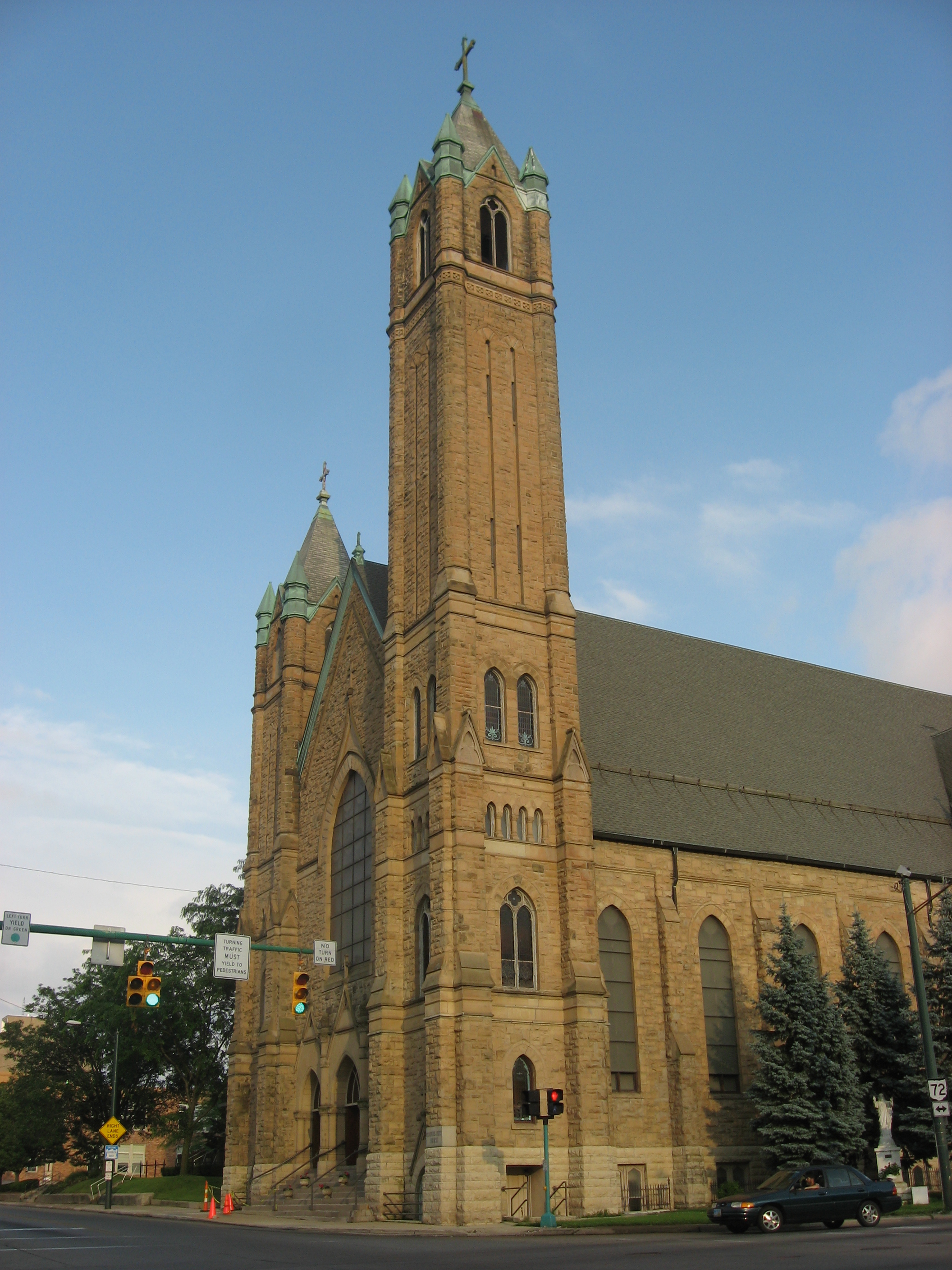
- Primary tower of the church, seen from the west-northwest

- Location within Ohio Location within the United States
- Location: 225 E. High St., Springfield, Ohio
- Coordinates: 39°55′22″N 83°48′23″W
- Area: Less than 1 acre (0.40 ha)
- Built: 1892
- Architect: Charles A. Cregar
- Architectural style: Gothic Revival
- NRHP reference No.: 76001381
- Added to NRHP: June 22, 1976

St. Raphael's Church is a historic Catholic church in the city of Springfield, Ohio, United States. Established in the 1840s as Springfield's first Catholic parish, it uses a Gothic Revival church building, the towers of which hold a prominent spot in the city's skyline. As a work of a leading city architect, the building has been named a historic site.

== History ==
None of Clark County's first residents were Catholics; the first Catholics moved into Springfield circa 1835, and by 1845, the community had nearly seventy Catholic families. The first priest to minister in Springfield was Henry Damian Juncker, the future Bishop of Alton, but his responsibilities elsewhere permitted him to visit Springfield only once or twice monthly, and services were held in private residences or in buildings owned by others. James F. Kearney was the first resident priest, coming in August 1840, but due to illness he resigned after one year's service. The members bought land in 1848, and the parish was officially erected in 1849 and dedicated to St. Raphael. Although money was originally lacking for the construction of a building, the parish's needs were supplied by wealthy Cincinnati resident Michael Cassily, and with his money the members built the foundation of a church building. Over the next quarter century, twelve different priests served the parish, holding tenures ranging from one to eighteen years. By the late 1860s, the parish was growing to the point that a single priest could no longer serve everyone: an assistant pastor was appointed in 1868, even though a second parish, St. Bernard, had been formed in 1860. Another parish, St. Joseph, was established in 1884.

When W.H. Sidley became the pastor in 1873, he was distressed to discover the parish's diminutive complex: a small brick house of worship, a tiny frame house used as a school, and no rectory whatsoever. He soon arranged for the construction of a rectory, which was finished in the following year at a cost of $7,000. Two years later, he began a more substantial school building, three stories tall, it was completed in September 1877 at a cost of $19,000. By the early 1890s, the church itself was proving insufficient for the parish's needs, and the process of replacing it began in early 1892 as the original brick building was destroyed. Six years passed before the completion of the replacement building, which was consecrated by William Henry Elder, the Archbishop of Cincinnati, on July 17, 1898.

St. Raphael's was the high school parish of Daniel Rudd, an African-American newspaperman who founded the first Black Catholic Newspaper in 1886, "American Catholic Tribune." An Ohio Historical Marker honoring him was dedicated Dec 12, 2021.

During the 1920s, the church prospered amid civil strife. In 1923, when Archbishop Moeller was raising money for Mount St. Mary's Seminary of the West, St. Raphael's was wealthy enough to provide $10,000 for the school fund, amounting to fully 10% of the total. Its funds also sponsored Springfield Central Catholic High School, meant for students of all city parishes rather than for St. Raphael parishioners only. Conversely, the church was the focus of rising Ku Klux Klan sentiment in Springfield. Among the most exciting incidents in the parish history occurred during a KKK parade: the Klansmen planned to process past the church, but the parish priest stood before the parade, blocking the way, and the Klansmen turned aside.

== Architecture ==
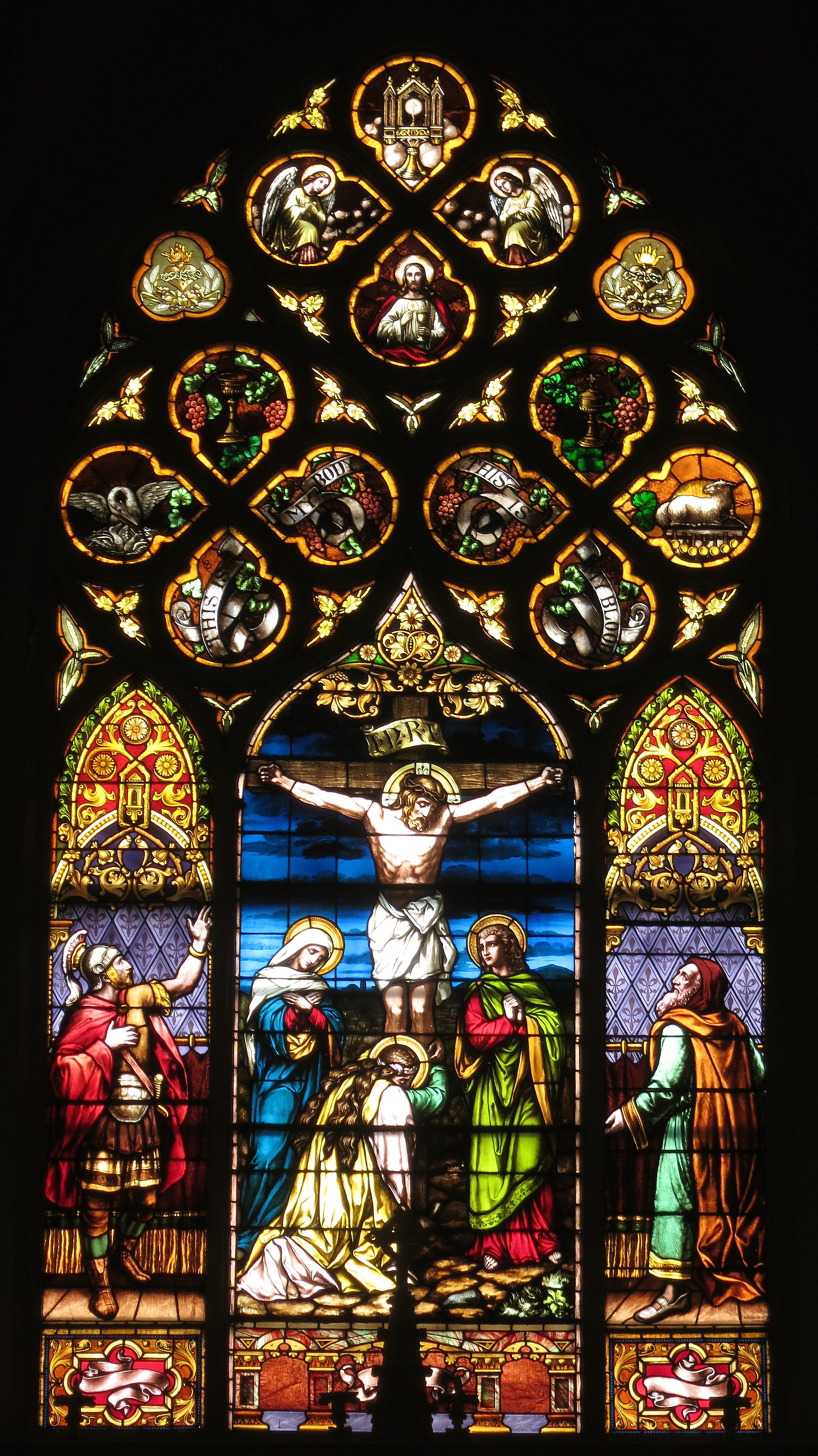
This Gothic stained glass window from the church apse depicts the Crucifixion of Jesus.

St. Raphael's is a high Gothic Revival structure, built of sandstone from Berea. Since construction in the 1890s, it has been one of Springfield's most distinctive buildings, due in large part to its two front towers — the bell tower is 135 feet (41 m) high, and the principal tower 184 feet (56 m). By climbing 156 steps to the summit of the principal tower, one gains a panoramic view of the city and surrounding countryside. The building's general plan is that of a streamlined Latin cross, with slight gabled projections near the rear forming the crosspieces. Three entrances pierce the facade, while lancet windows of similar height are placed at varying locations in the towers, and two-story windows fill the side bays. Widest and tallest are the windows placed in the rear-side projections and above the entrances on the facade. Both towers are topped with pointed roofs, surrounded by ornamental pointed roofs of far smaller sizes, while the roof of the main part of the church is a steep gable. Despite extensive Gothic Revival detailing, such as the pointed-arch windows and doorways, the building also retains some elements of the Romanesque Revival style, including the false buttresses and columns around the main entrance, as well as the sheer massing of both towers. By the time that the building was complete, parishioners had spent $75,000 on construction and ancillary costs. The architect for St. Raphael's was Charles A. Cregar, first among architects native to Springfield. Cregar was responsible for numerous grand buildings in Springfield, including City Hall, and St. Raphael's is among the chief examples of his work.

== Recent history ==
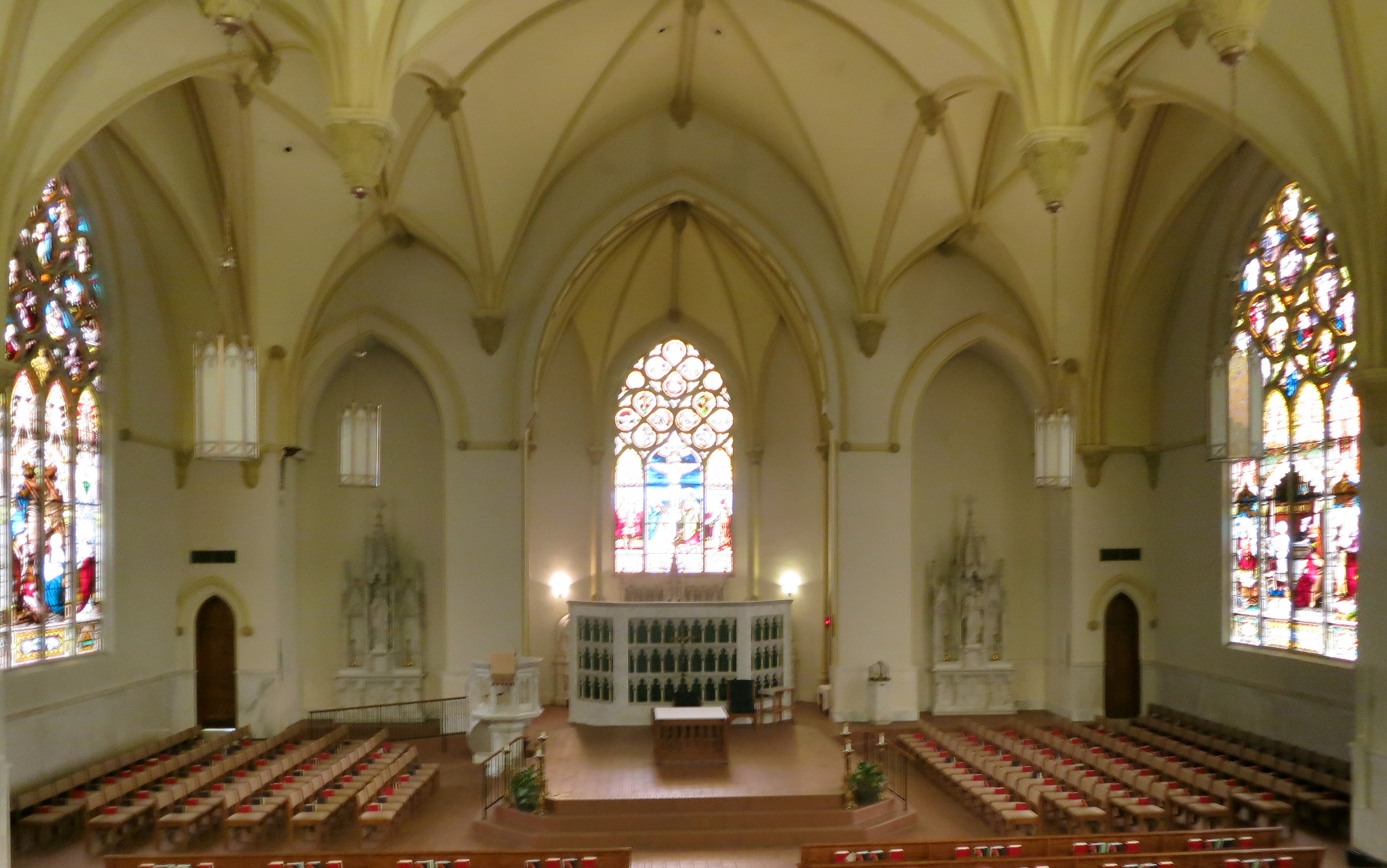
The church nave.

St. Raphael's remains an active part of the Roman Catholic Archdiocese of Cincinnati, but no longer as a separate parish: St. Joseph's and St. Raphael's have been combined into a single parish. The church building itself has received wide recognition: it was listed on the National Register of Historic Places in June 1976, due to its historically significant architecture. It is one of six Cregar-designed buildings listed on the Register, along with the former city hall, St. John's Evangelical Lutheran Church, the former Arcade Hotel, St. Joseph's Church, and the former Third Presbyterian Church.
