= St. Joseph's Catholic Church (Springfield, Ohio) =

Historic church in Ohio, United States

- St. Joseph Roman Catholic Church
- U.S. National Register of Historic Places
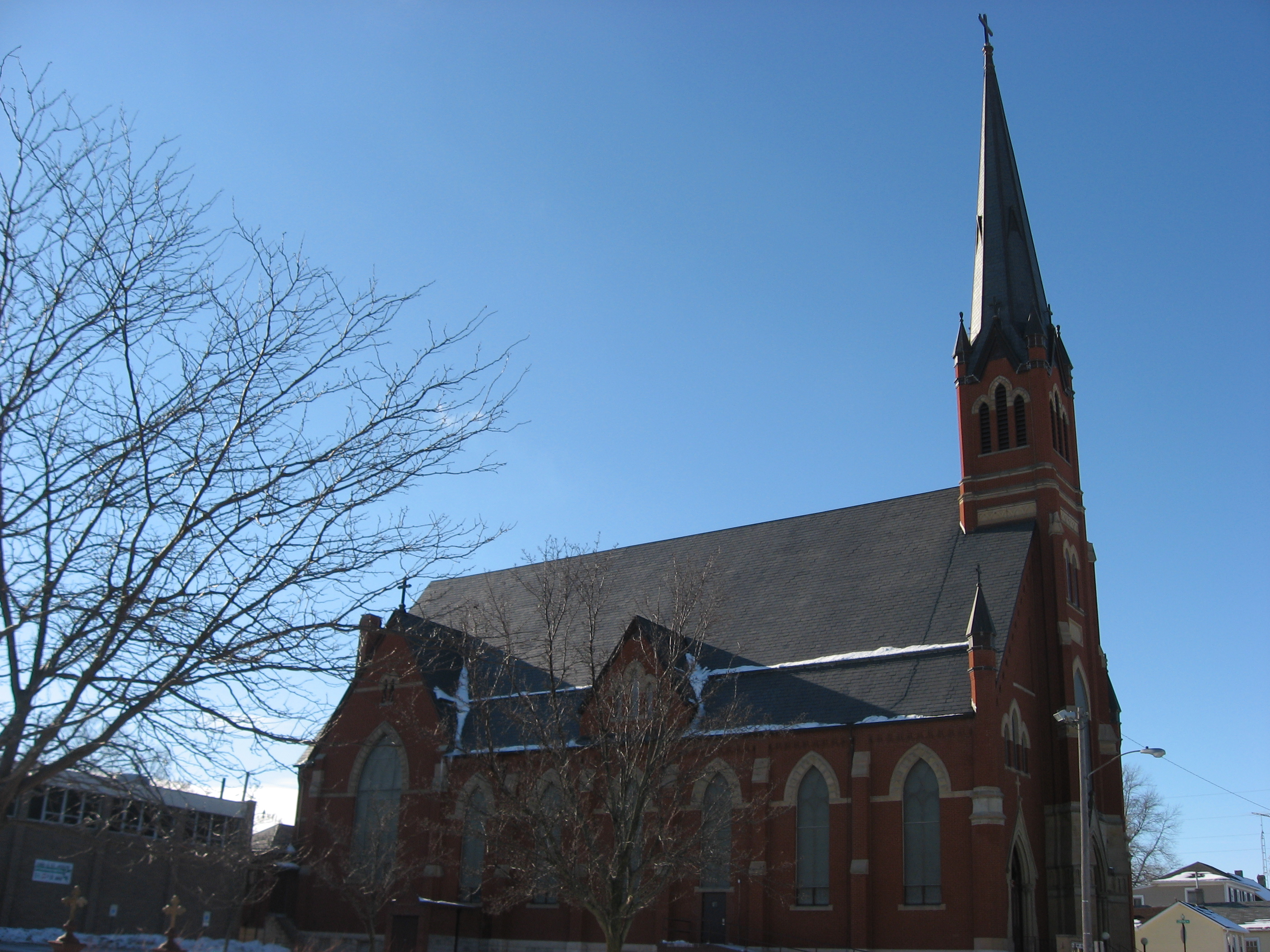
- Eastern side of the church

- Location within Ohio Location within the United States
- Location: 802 Kenton St., Springfield, Ohio
- Coordinates: 39°54′57″N 83°47′52″W
- Area: Less than 1 acre (0.40 ha)
- Built: 1892
- Architect: Charles A. Cregar
- Architectural style: Early Romanesque Revival
- NRHP reference No.: 82003552
- Added to NRHP: March 15, 1982

St. Joseph's Church is a historic Catholic church in the city of Springfield, Ohio, United States. Established in the 1880s to serve southeastern Springfield's growing Catholic population, it uses a tall Romanesque Revival church building, which was designed by a leading city architect; the building has been named a historic site.

== Early years ==
As late as the year 1, not a single Catholic was resident in Clark County, but twenty Catholic families moved to Springfield between 1835 and 1845, and by 1850 there were approximately seventy Catholic families in the city. In 1849, the Bishop of Cincinnati created Springfield's first parish, Saint Raphael. By the 1880s, large numbers of Catholics were living on Springfield's southeastern side, and preparations for a separate parish began with the purchase of three lots of land in 1881. A parish school building was begun in 1882, and the new Church of St. Joseph was created a separate parish in the same year. By late 1883, the school was open, and C.M. Berding was appointed the first parish priest on New Year's Day 1884. During his ministry, construction began on the present building in 1892; extensive debt was taken on, but the work of Berding and his two successors saw the building raised to architectural grandeur and the debt reduced to nearly nothing. By 1908, the parish comprised four hundred member families, and the school enrolled approximately four hundred and fifty children.

== Architecture ==
St. Joseph's is a tall Gothic Revival structure crowned by a prominent spire atop its bell tower. Built of brick on an uncollected foundation, the building is decorated with elements of brick and stone. The facade is divided into three bays, with the middle protruding slightly from the side bays. Entrances are placed in each bay, with a large pointed-arch window above the central entrance and three smaller such windows above the side. Polygonal engaged columns are placed on the corners, rising to small pointed towers above the edge of the steep roof. Many of the building's windows are filled with stained glass. Construction was financed by loans; between the borrowed money and interest on the loans, the parish spent $76,000 to build their church and school. The architect was Charles A. Cregar, one of the most prominent architects in Springfield's history. By the time he was chosen for St. Joseph's Church, Cregar had established himself as a Romanesque Revival architect, due to his designs for buildings such as the city hall; while St. Joseph's Church is generally a Romanesque Revival structure, due to elements such as apparent machicolations, the windows and the high steeple demonstrate Gothic Revival influences.

== Recent history ==
St. Joseph's remains an active part of the Roman Catholic Archdiocese of Cincinnati, but no longer as a separate parish: St. Raphael's and St. Joseph's have been combined into a single parish. The church building itself has received wide recognition: it was listed on the National Register of Historic Places in early 1982, due to its historically significant architecture. It is one of six Cregar-designed buildings listed on the Register, along with the former city hall, St. John's Evangelical Church, the former Arcade Hotel, St. Raphael's Church, and the former Third Presbyterian Church.
