= Mercer, Maine =

- Town
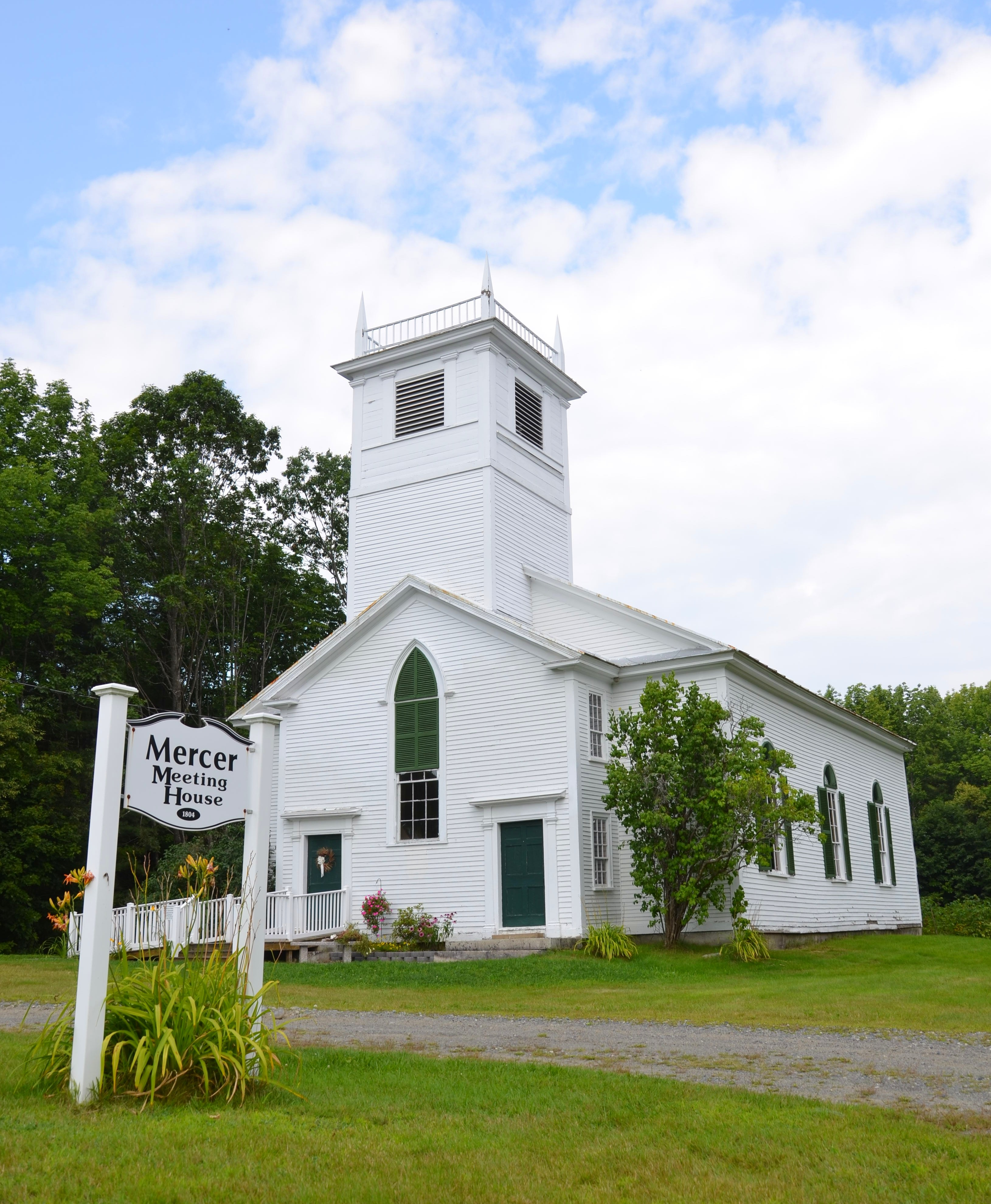
- The Mercer Union Meetinghouse, a historic church in the center of town.

- Logo

- Location within Maine Location within the United States
- Coordinates: 44°38′15″N 69°53′26″W
- Country: United States
- State: Maine
- County: Somerset
- Named for: Hugh Mercer

Area
  - Total: 27.36 sq mi (70.86 km^{2})
  - Land: 26.71 sq mi (69.18 km^{2})
  - Water: 0.65 sq mi (1.68 km^{2})
- Elevation: 472 ft (144 m)

Population (2020)
  - Total: 709
  - Density: 26/sq mi (10.2/km^{2})
- Time zone: UTC-5 (Eastern (EST))
  - Summer (DST): UTC-4 (EDT)
- ZIP Code: 04957
- Area code: 207
- FIPS code: 23-45110
- GNIS feature ID: 582591
- Website: mercermaine.com

Mercer is a town in Somerset County, Maine, United States. The town was named after the Revolutionary War hero Hugh Mercer. The population was 709 at the 2020 census.

== Geography ==
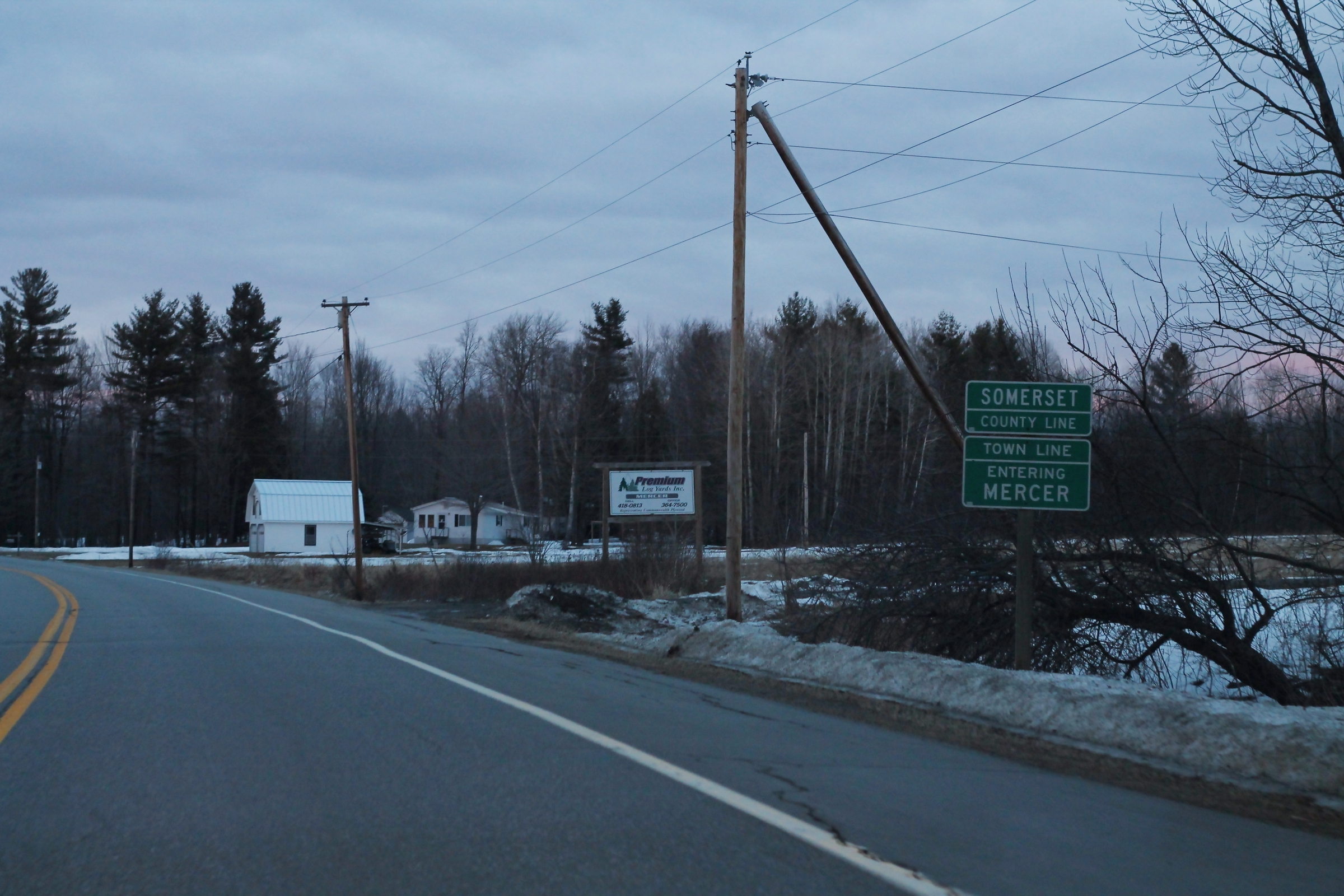
A street sign designating Mercer.

According to the United States Census Bureau, the town has a total area of 27.36 square miles (70.86 km^{2}), of which 26.71 square miles (69.18 km^{2}) is land and 0.65 square miles (1.68 km^{2}) is water.

== Demographics ==
Historical population
Census	Pop.	Note	%±
1810	562		—
1820	743		32.2%
1830	1,210		62.9%
1840	1,432		18.3%
1850	1,186		−17.2%
1860	1,059		−10.7%
1870	846		−20.1%
1880	755		−10.8%
1890	584		−22.6%
1900	493		−15.6%
1910	441		−10.5%
1920	453		2.7%
1930	408		−9.9%
1940	381		−6.6%
1950	348		−8.7%
1960	272		−21.8%
1970	313		15.1%
1980	448		43.1%
1990	593		32.4%
2000	647		9.1%
2010	664		2.6%
2020	709		6.8%
U.S. Decennial Census

=== 2010 census ===
As of the census of 2010, there were 664 people, 287 households, and 199 families living in the town. The population density was 24.9 inhabitants per square mile (9.6/km^{2}). There were 399 housing units at an average density of 14.9 per square mile (5.8/km^{2}). The racial makeup of the town was 98.3% White, 0.2% African American, 0.6% Native American, 0.5% Asian, and 0.5% from two or more races. Hispanic or Latino of any race were 0.3% of the population.

There were 287 households, of which 22.3% had children under the age of 18 living with them, 57.1% were married couples living together, 8.7% had a female householder with no husband present, 3.5% had a male householder with no wife present, and 30.7% were non-families. 24.0% of all households were made up of individuals, and 8.3% had someone living alone who was 65 years of age or older. The average household size was 2.31 and the average family size was 2.69.

The median age in the town was 48.4 years. 18.1% of residents were under the age of 18; 6.1% were between the ages of 18 and 24; 19.8% were from 25 to 44; 40.1% were from 45 to 64; and 16.1% were 65 years of age or older. The gender makeup of the town was 48.9% male and 51.1% female.

=== 2000 census ===
As of the census of 2000, there were 647 people, 256 households, and 178 families living in the town. The population density was 24.2 people per square mile (9.4/km^{2}). There were 366 housing units at an average density of 13.7 per square mile (5.3/km^{2}). The racial makeup of the town was 97.06% White, 0.15% African American, 0.31% Native American, 1.39% Asian, 0.62% from other races, and 0.46% from two or more races. Hispanic or Latino of any race were 0.62% of the population.

There were 256 households, out of which 31.6% had children under the age of 18 living with them, 59.4% were married couples living together, 5.9% had a female householder with no husband present, and 30.1% were non-families. 19.9% of all households were made up of individuals, and 9.0% had someone living alone who was 65 years of age or older. The average household size was 2.53 and the average family size was 2.94.

In the town, the population was spread out, with 24.3% under the age of 18, 6.6% from 18 to 24, 26.0% from 25 to 44, 30.8% from 45 to 64, and 12.4% who were 65 years of age or older. The median age was 42 years. For every 100 females, there were 91.4 males. For every 100 females age 18 and over, there were 97.6 males.

The median income for a household in the town was $37,500, and the median income for a family was $41,250. Males had a median income of $34,028 versus $21,295 for females. The per capita income for the town was $18,068. About 7.2% of families and 12.6% of the population were below the poverty line, including 12.1% of those under age 18 and 15.1% of those age 65 or over.

== Notable person ==
- Frank Munsey, newspaper and magazine publisher, author
