= South Fountain Avenue Historic District =

Historic district in Ohio, United States

South Fountain Avenue Historic District: South Fountain Preservation Inc.; South Fountain Avenue Springfield
- Neighborhood
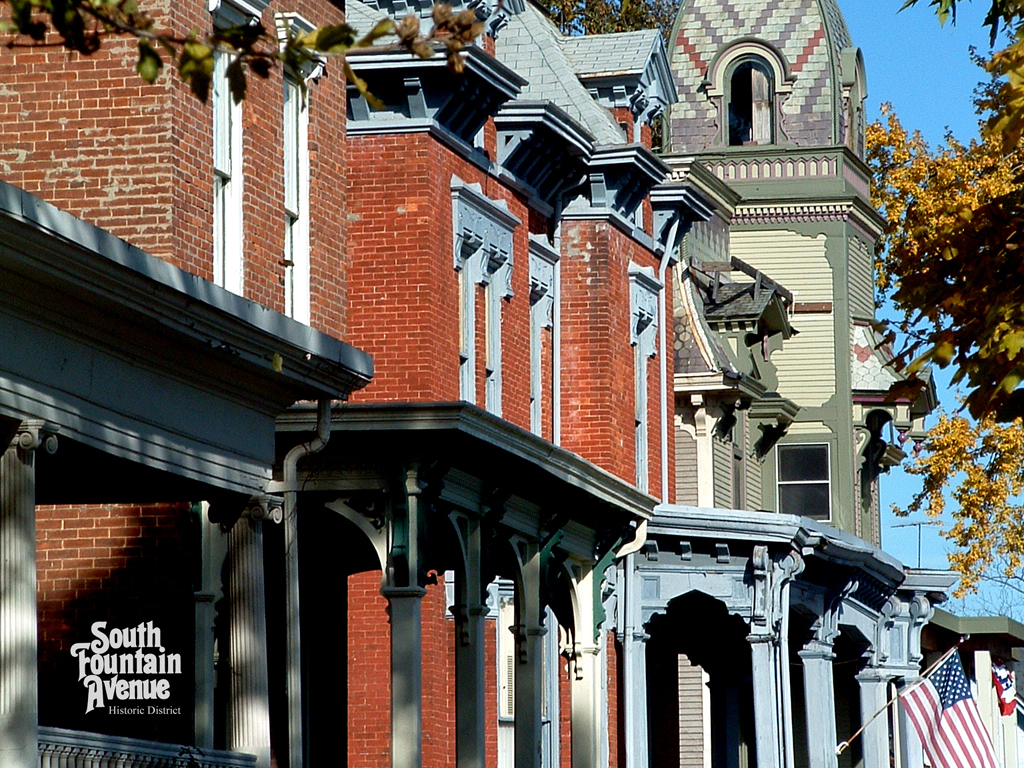
- Interactive map of South Fountain Avenue; Historic District
- Country: United States
- State: Ohio
- County: Clark
- City: Springfield
- Website: www.southfountain.org

The South Fountain Avenue Historic District is a residential neighborhood in Springfield, Ohio, United States. This historic district is listed in the National Register of Historic Places.

== History ==
Developed during Springfield's industrial growth of the 1850s to the 1920s, the South Fountain Avenue Historic District encompasses about 15 square blocks south of downtown Springfield, across the street from South High School. Among its prominent early residents were Oliver S. Kelly, William N. Whiteley, and Francis Bookwalter. It became a neighborhood of the affluent owners of Whiteley's Champion Reaper and other district-owned businesses.

== Neighborhood history ==
The South Fountain Historic District is the largest intact concentration of high-style late-19th and early-20th century houses in Springfield and as the embodiment of the growth of the upper middle class and the prosperity of the industrial and business leaders who populated the neighborhood. Notable houses include examples of the transitional Greek Revival-Italianate, Gothic Revival, Italianate, Second Empire, Eastlake porches, Queen Anne, Colonial Revival, along with more typical turn-of-the-century housing. Several churches, small commercial buildings and a fire station are the only non-residential buildings original to the area.

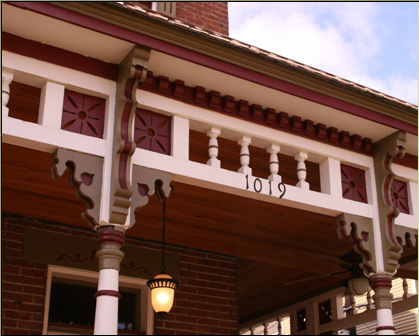
The W.S. Straley House

A number of important business and industry leaders lived along South Fountain, particularly those associated with two of the earliest and most successful early industries: the James Leffel Co. and Whiteley, Fassler & Kelly (later, the Champion Company). Warren Leffel, son of the founder, lived at 704 South Fountain. Francis Bookwalter, vice-president and treasurer, lived at 611. Amos Whiteley, a founder, lived at 509; William N. Whiteley at 1103, Oliver S. Kelly, a founder, lived at 403; his son Oliver W. Kelly lived at 621. Robert Johnson, secretary, lived at 429. Other important residents included Andrew Black, a dry-goods merchant who built Black's Opera House (353 S. Fountain), William D. Bayley, owner of the William Bayley Co. (521 S. Fountain), James Johnson Jr., leading attorney and mayor in 1895 (563 S. Fountain), Hector Urquhart, owner and president of the Springfield Baking Co. (1025 S. Fountain) and Edward W. Simpson, fire chief from 1885 to 1904 and owner of Simpson Lumber Co. (705 S. Fountain).

== Buildings ==
=== Francis M. Bookwalter Mansion ===
Francis M. Bookwalter, Vice President and Treasurer of James Leffel & Co., built his Second Empire house in 1876, placing it in the country for the safety of his children. From Bookwalter's private astronomical observatory, Springfield's first public timepiece was wired to strike the hour on the bell of the Central Fire House, one-half mile north. Separately listed on the National Register, it had only two owners in its first one hundred years. It was last placed for sale in 2017.

=== Charles Stout House ===
Charles Stout purchased the land this house stands on in 1874. The treasurer of casket manufacturer Deardoff, Mellen & Co, Stout lived in the house for over 30 years. This two and a half story brick house has a third bay main entrance under an elaborate Italianate style porch with delicately curved arches. The narrow elongated double hung sash windows, characteristic of the Italianate style, have carved stone shelf lintels and sills. The low hip roof has a bracketed box cornice and an entablature.

=== Frank H. Coblentz House ===
A duplex, this residence was designed by its first resident, Frank H. Coblentz, a pharmacist in Springfield. This house is known as the "steamboat house" because of the rounded glass windows at the front, both first and second floors. Originally there was a low railing around the upper story, giving even more the appearance of a steamboat. Inside, there are five glazed brick fireplaces on each side, each a different color. They were built for gas-fed heating fixtures and so are more shallow and have a thinner concrete foundation layer than a wood fireplace.

=== Warren C. Leffel House ===
This house was built around 1876 for Warren C. Leffel, who inhabited it for twenty years; it is one of the district's better Second Empire structures, featuring elements such as the mansard roof.

=== Dr. William Marquart House ===
William Marquart was a prominent physician and agriculturalist who built his house circa 1875, mixing Italianate and Eastlake elements: windows with friezes below the brackets on one hand, but a distinctively Eastlake porch. The house reflects a philosophy of using highly rectangular ornamentation, usually in the form of trefoils or quatrefoils (three and four-lobed openings).

=== William S. Barker House ===
William S. Barker was a local merchant tailor with a shop within walking distance of his house, where he lived from 1882 until his 1896 death. During his life, Barker was head of Mast, Foos, and Company, and he was one of the founders of the Clark County Historical Society. A large Stick style house, it sits between the Marquart and Cole-Scott Houses. Like many other houses in the neighborhood, the house had been divided into apartments by the beginning of World War II.

=== Alfred M. Potter House ===
A brick Stick-Eastlake style house, this was built in 1886 for Alfred M. Potter, a prominent doctor and civic leader. The alley immediately north of the house is named for his wife, the former Lily M. Obenchain. Both the front and right side are sheltered by a Stick-style veranda, and the slate roof features details such as crests and a dentilled underside. During the 1970s, renovators found the Potters' signatures on the original walls.

=== W.A. Scott House ===
Also known as the Scott Mansion, the William A. Scott House was built in 1883 in the Stick-Eastlake style used by its neighbors. Among the hallmarks of the style are its paired front windows, narrow horizontal clapboarding, and imbricated shingles at the peak. Inside, the mantels and interior doorways are cunningly crafted, along with the chamfering on numerous edges and the parquet flooring.

=== David F. Reese House ===
David F. Reese, a craftsman, constructed this Colonial Revival style house in 1880 while residing with relatives at 14 West Liberty Street. Clinton Reese, secretary of the Good and Reese Company, occupied this dwelling during its early years; among those who followed him were John Elliot, a prominent insurance salesperson, and George Leffel. This house combines the Dutch Colonial Revival style with saltbox influences, and the roof rises to a point.

=== W.S. Straley House ===
William S. Straley built this house in 1884, but it was foreclosed upon in December 1885 and sold at sheriff's sale to Christian C. Funk. Nevertheless, Straley, manager of S.J. Straley & Company, merchants in foreign and domestic fruits, continued to live at the address until 1889. The house sold several more times over the years, once for as little as $1.00. The design is primarily Italianate, although the porch is more strongly Eastlake.

=== James and Margaret Wood House ===
James and Margaret Wood were among Springfield's large Irish population, but this house contrasts with the poverty of most of their compatriots in the city. Constructed in 1892 in the Queen Anne style, this was likely built by James himself, as he was a carpenter. Among its decorative components are detailed work on the porch gable and the stained glass windows in the facade.

=== Tuttle-Hume House ===
Albert T. Tuttle was the co-owner of Braley & Tuttle, a coal, wood, and kindling company. He built the house in 1884 and sold it a decade later to Robert and Mary Hume, the minister of the downtown United Presbyterian Church and his wife. This is another Stick-Eastlake residence.

== South Fountain Preservation, Inc. ==
South Fountain Preservation, Inc. is the neighborhood association in the South Fountain Avenue Historic District and a registered 501(c)3 not-for-profit corporation. Former in fall 1976 after hours of discussion over a kitchen table, the group began holding regular monthly meetings. Mailings were sent to property owners encouraging them to attend and air their opinions. South Fountain Preservation was chartered as a non-profit corporation in the summer of 1977. The 15-member board of directors was chosen and officers were elected.

== Tours and events ==
=== South Fountain Historic District Tour of Homes ===
The South Fountain Historic District Tour of Homes shows 10 period residences and gardens, including Second Empire, Queen Anne, Italianate, and Arts and Crafts houses. The purpose of the Tour of Homes is to display Springfield's historic residences, attract would-be buyers who are interested in revitalizing the South Fountain Historic District, and to inspire respect for Springfield's history.

=== Porch Festival ===
The South Fountain Preservation, Inc. Annual Fall Porch Festival invites the community to visit the district in a less formal setting than the Tour of Homes. Activities frequently include antique car shows, plant sale, and vendors selling items such as antiques, crafts, tatted lace, purses and baked goods.

=== Summer walking tours ===
The Springfield Preservation Alliance sponsors annual summer walking tours to highlight architecture and historical events.
