= Shawnee Hotel =

- U.S. National Register of Historic Places
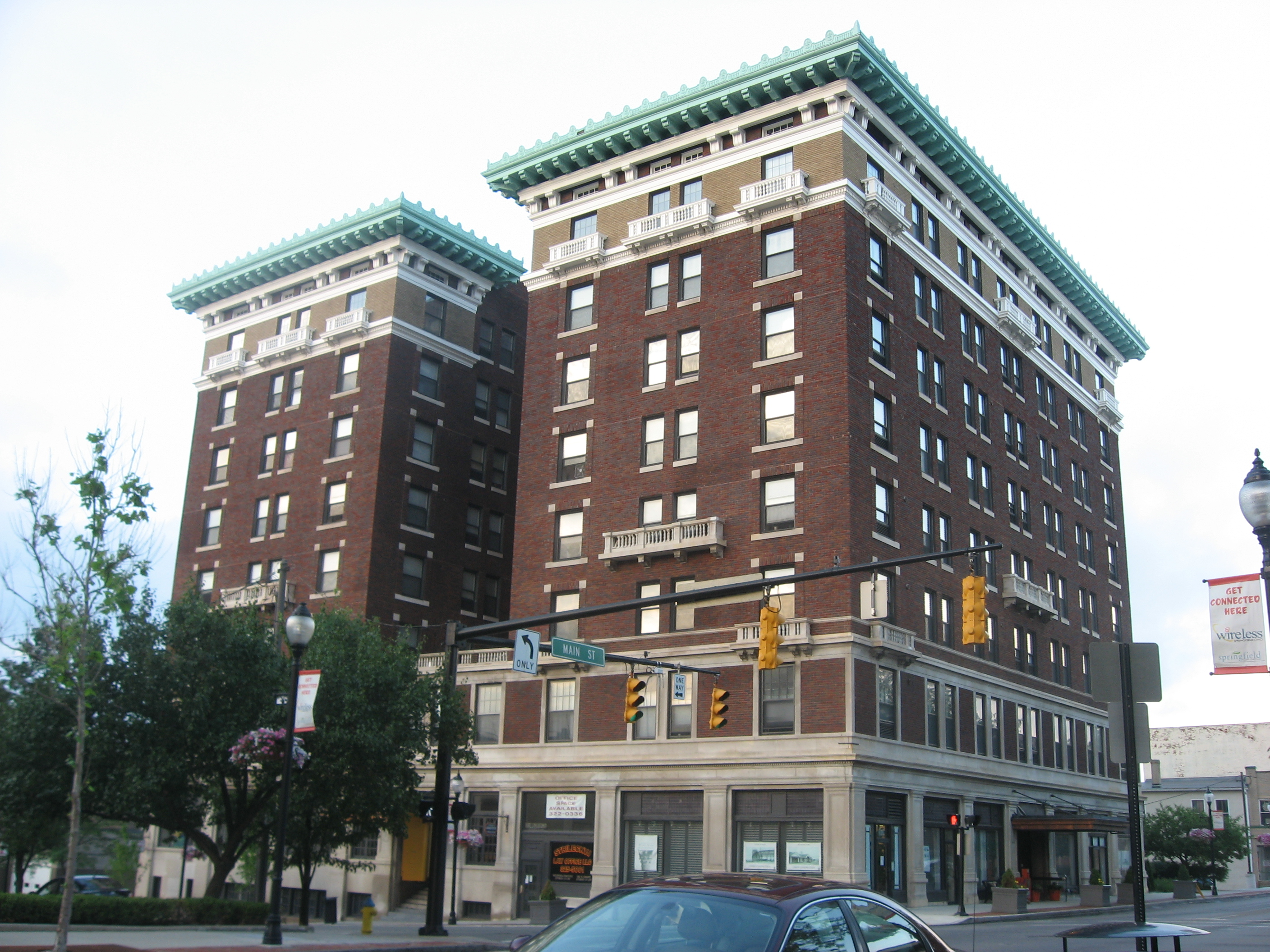
- Western side in June 2010

- Location within Ohio Location within the United States
- Location: Main and Limestone Sts., Springfield, Ohio
- Coordinates: 39°55′29″N 83°48′29.8″W
- Area: less than one acre
- Built: 1916
- Built by: Caldwell-Marshall Co.
- Architect: H. Ziegler Dietz
- Architectural style: Classical Revival
- NRHP reference No.: 85003044
- Added to NRHP: December 5, 1985

The Shawnee Hotel, now called Shawnee Place, is a historic building in Springfield, Ohio. It is located on Main and Limestone Streets and at eight stories was the tallest building in Springfield when it was built in 1916–1917. It included such innovations as in-room plumbing, meeting rooms, and banquet facilities.

The hotel was in operation through the 1960s when converted to a residential hotel. It later was vacant until 1985, when it was converted to senior housing. The building was renovated again in 2009, and in 2012 became senior living apartments managed by Episcopal Retirement Homes.

The building was listed on the National Register of Historic Places on December 5, 1985.
