= Third Presbyterian Church (Springfield, Ohio) =

Historic church in Ohio, United States

- U.S. National Register of Historic Places
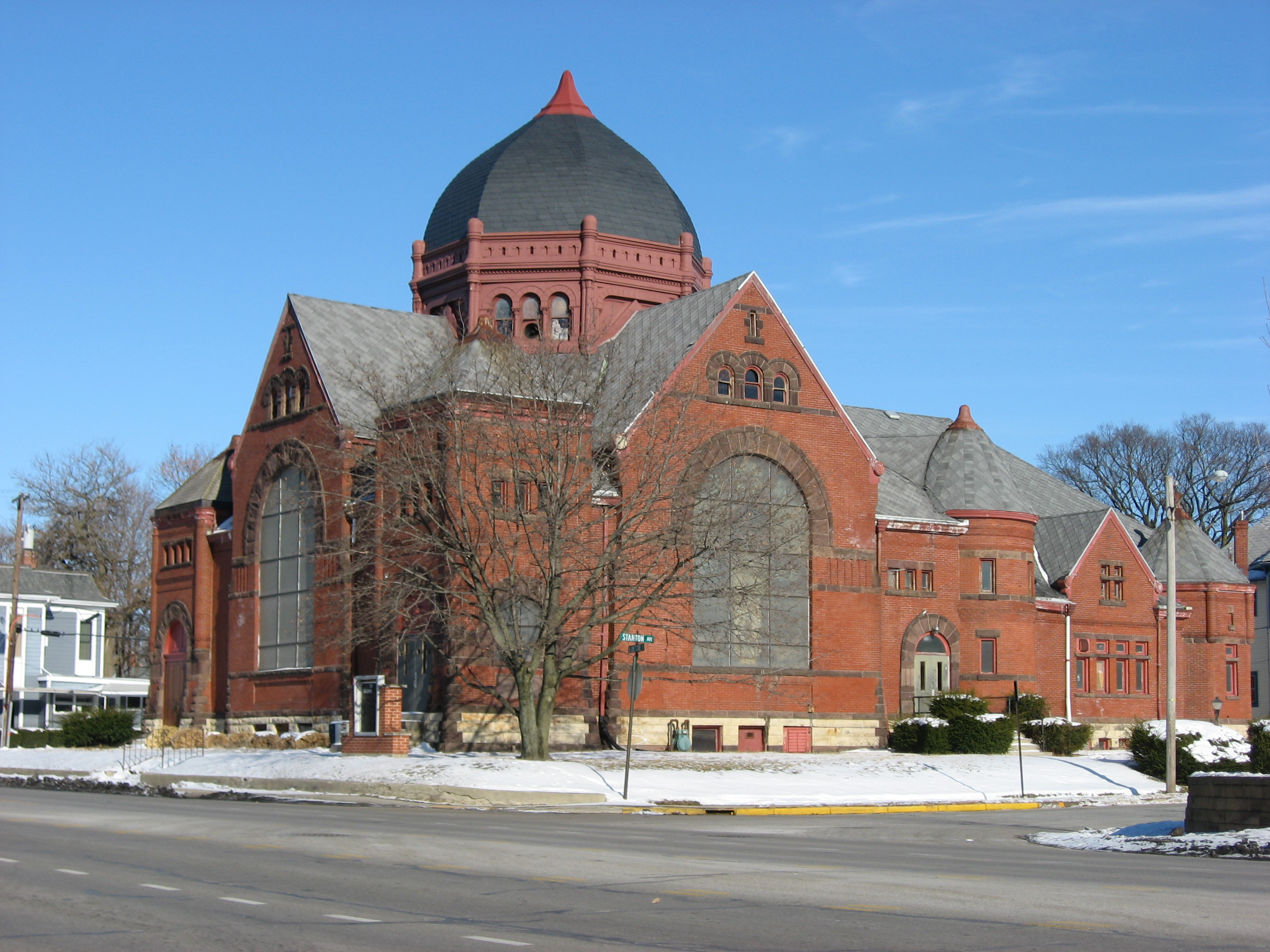
- Front and side of the church

- Location within Ohio Location within the United States
- Location: 714 N. Limestone St., Springfield, Ohio
- Coordinates: 39°55′58″N 83°48′20″W
- Area: Less than 1 acre (0.40 ha)
- Built: 1894
- Architect: Charles A. Cregar; Russell Bros.
- Architectural style: Romanesque Revival
- NRHP reference No.: 80002958
- Added to NRHP: January 3, 1980

Third Presbyterian Church is a historic former Presbyterian church building in Springfield, Ohio, United States. A Romanesque Revival building completed in 1894 along Limestone Street on the city's northern side, Third Presbyterian is one of the final buildings designed by prominent Springfield architect Charles A. Cregar.

== Congregational history ==
Springfield's first Presbyterian church was organized on July 17, 1819, and its second in 1860. Together, the two churches operated a mission Sunday school on the city's northern side, starting in late 1878. As the years passed, the two churches began to gain members in the northern neighborhoods, and the Dayton Presbytery organized these members as Third Presbyterian Church on May 11, 1891. With over one hundred charter members, the congregation soon began planning to erect their own house of worship; under the leadership of the Russell Brothers firm, construction took place during the last quarter of 1893, and the new building was dedicated on January 28, 1894. The congregation's first minister was George H. Fullerton. During his pastorate and that of the succeeding minister, the congregation grew greatly; by 1908, the membership had increased to 346.

As the years passed, Third Presbyterian changed its name to Northminster Presbyterian Church. Since that time, the church has moved to Villa Road on the city's outskirts, and the building has passed into the ownership of the Church of God Sanctified. A congregation of Fellowship Christian Church began worshipping in the building in early 2014.

== Architecture ==
One of Springfield's most significant churches and among the most distinctive of all of its public buildings, Third Presbyterian is built of brick and rests on a foundation of limestone; it is covered with a slate roof, and it features elements of sandstone and terracotta. Distinguishing it from all of Springfield's other churches is its unusual clerestory and its unique octagonal onion dome. Among the most unusual elements of the dome is its hidden means of structural support: because no columns are present in the building's interior upon which the dome can rest, it is apparent that the dome's weight rests upon a collection of arches, which work together to distribute the dome's weight. Architectural historians have understood the shape and support of Third Presbyterian's dome as an indication that it was patterned after the Dome of the Rock in Jerusalem. It cannot be compared with domes in any other Cregar-designed buildings, for Third Presbyterian was the only building that he designed with a dome. Throughout the church's history, its exterior appearance has remained the same; no significant changes have ever been made to it.

== Recognition ==
In 1980, Third Presbyterian Church was listed on the National Register of Historic Places; it is one of four Springfield churches on the Register, along with St. Raphael's Catholic Church, St. Joseph's Catholic Church, and St. John's Evangelical Lutheran Church, all of which were also designed by Cregar. It qualified for inclusion on the Register due to its historically significant architecture, which was deemed to be significant throughout Ohio; seen as the leading part of its architecture and thus of its historic significance was its unique octagonal onion dome.
