= Mercer Union Meetinghouse =

Historic church in Maine, United States

- U.S. National Register of Historic Places
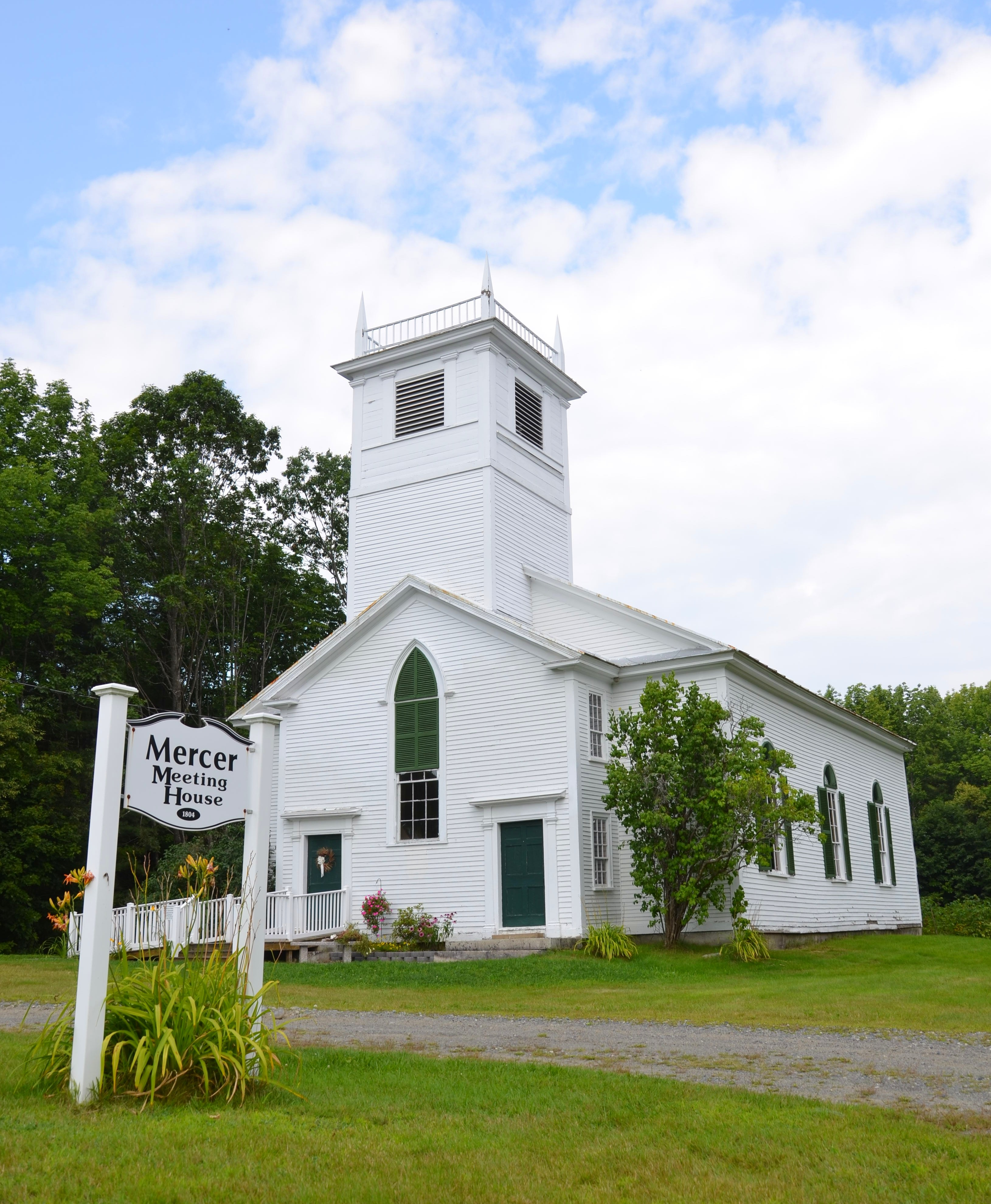

- Location within Maine Location within the United States
- Location: Main St., 1/10 mi. W of jct. with US 2, Mercer, Maine
- Coordinates: 44°40′37″N 69°55′54″W
- Area: 0.5 acres (0.20 ha)
- Built: 1829
- Architectural style: Greek Revival, Gothic Revival
- Website: mercermeetinghouse
- NRHP reference No.: 06001223
- Added to NRHP: January 9, 2007

The Mercer Union Meetinghouse is a historic church in Mercer, Maine, USA. Built in 1829 for several different denominations to share, this church is a relatively early and rare example of transitional Federal-Gothic styling in the state, with its tower set partially over the entrance vestibule, another uncommon feature. The building was listed on the National Register of Historic Places in 2007.

== Description and history ==
The church is set on the north side of Main Street, a short way west of its junction with US 2. It is a rectangular wood-frame structure with a projecting vestibule area at the front (south-facing facade). Its gable roof is pedimented up to the vestibule, which itself has only partial returns, owing to a large Gothic-arched window at its center. A pair of identical entrances flank this window in the projecting section. The square tower rises partially over the vestibule and partially over the main block, its first stage with a plain clapboarded finish, and the second, belfry stage flushboarded with louvered openings. Corner spires and a balustrade cap the tower. The doorways lead into separate small vestibules, from which doorways lead into the main hall. The pews are a transitional style between older box pews and bench pews, set in groups, with the ends painted in an unusual false wood-grain style. The walls are wainscoted below and finished in pressed tin above, which is continued into the ceiling, which is finished with tin paneling.

The meetinghouse was built in 1829 to house the activities of several different congregations. The Methodists had organized in the town in the early 19th century, and the Congregationalists in 1822, but neither had a permanent sanctuary until this one was built. Funding was also raised by the sale of pews to Universalists, who also made use of the building. By 1857, the building was apparently being used exclusively by Congregationalists, whose congregation folded in the early 20th century. The building was thereafter used by the Methodists again, but only on a seasonal basis. The building is now owned and maintained by the Mercer Meetinghouse Association, a local non-profit organization.

== See also ==
- National Register of Historic Places listings in Somerset County, Maine
