= Buck-Mercer House =

- U.S. National Register of Historic Places
- Location within Kentucky Location within the United States
- Nearest city: Somerset, Kentucky
- Coordinates: 37°14′02″N 84°35′04″W
- Area: 1.2 acres (0.49 ha)
- Built: c.1810, 1858
- Architectural style: Double pen dog trot
- MPS: Pulaski County MRA
- NRHP reference No.: 84001941
- Added to NRHP: August 14, 1984

The Buck-Mercer House, on Waynesburg Road in Pulaski County, Kentucky near Somerset, was initially built around 1810 as a single pen log house.

The south pen was constructed with half-dovetail notching and included a limestone chimney. In 1858, a second, north pen with a dog trot between was added. It is the only surviving double pen dogtrot house in the county.
