= Daniel Hertzler House =

- U.S. National Register of Historic Places
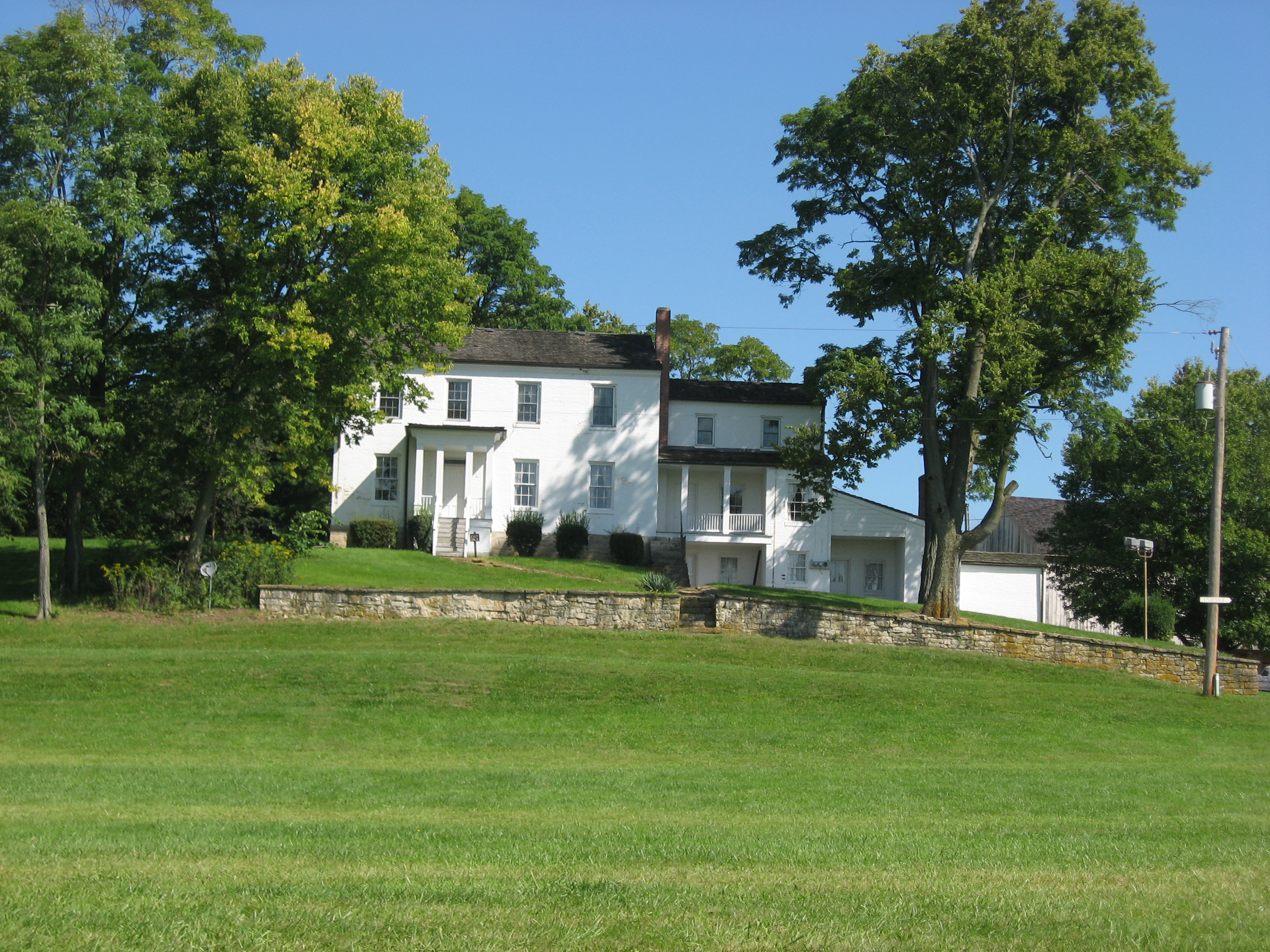

- Location within Ohio Location within the United States
- Location: West of Springfield, Ohio off State Route 4, in Bethel Township
- Coordinates: 39°54′33″N 83°54′40″W
- Area: 1 acre (0.40 ha)
- Built: c. 1854
- Architectural style: Pennsylvania "Bank Style"
- NRHP reference No.: 78002018
- Added to NRHP: February 7, 1978

The Daniel Hertzler House, near Springfield, Ohio, was built in c. 1854. It is a brick house of Pennsylvania "Bank Style" architecture, larger and more complex than other historic structures in Clark County, Ohio. It was listed on the U.S. National Register of Historic Places in 1978.

Hertzler became wealthy in the milling and distilling business in Mad River Township, selling that in 1853; and then entering into businesses in Springfield, including a Clark County Bank. He had nearly completed construction on a new milling business, when he was murdered in his home on the morning of October 10, 1867.
