= Marquart-Mercer Farm =

- U.S. National Register of Historic Places
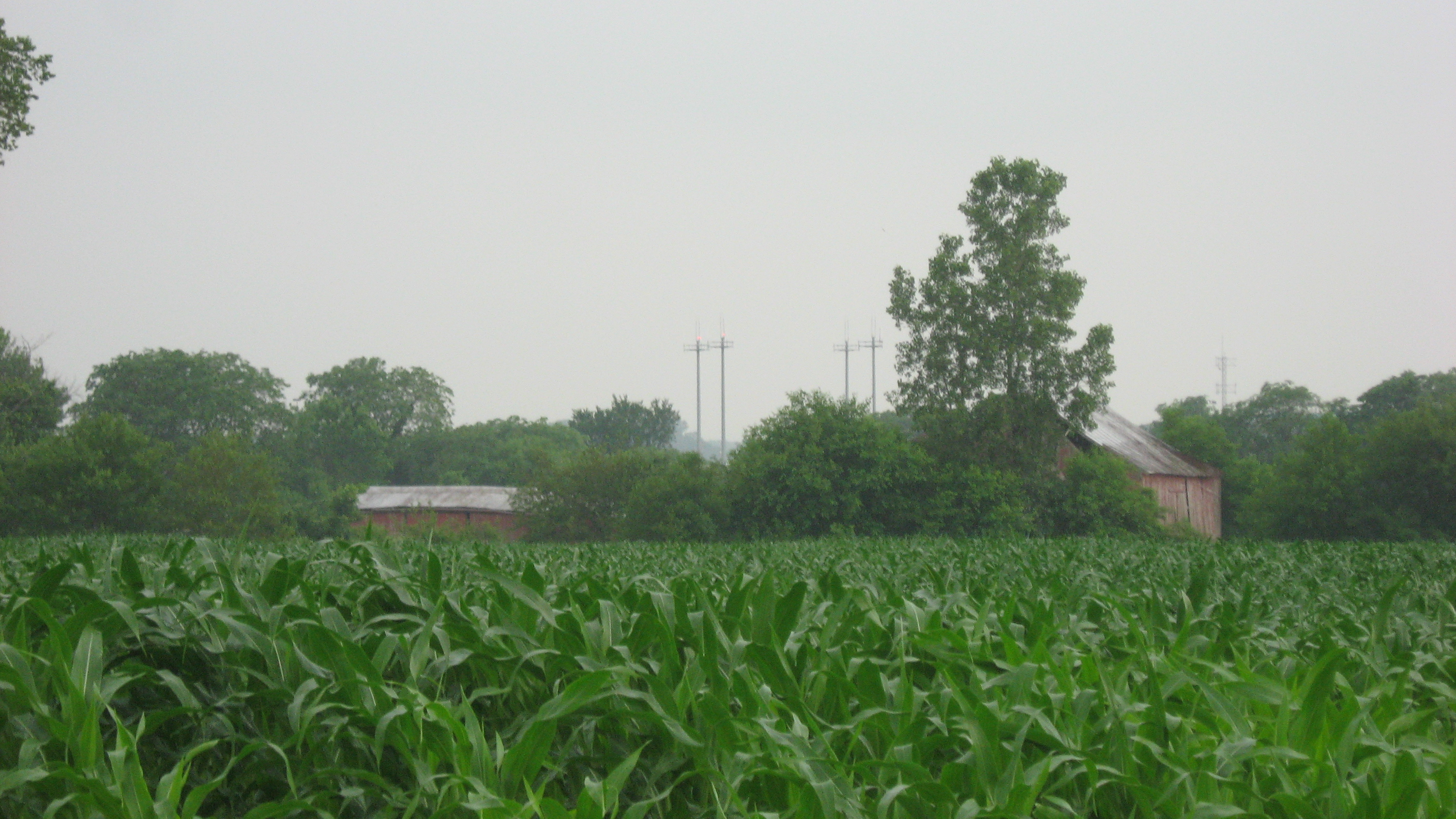

- Location within Ohio Location within the United States
- Nearest city: Springfield, Ohio
- Coordinates: 39°51′21″N 83°49′47″W
- Area: 2 acres (0.81 ha)
- Built: 1827
- Built by: Marquart, Philip
- Architectural style: Federal
- NRHP reference No.: 79001791
- Added to NRHP: July 26, 1979

The Marquart-Mercer Farm in Clark County, Ohio, southwest of Springfield, Ohio, is listed on the U.S. National Register of Historic Places.

The listing includes a three contributing buildings which include a two-story brick Federal-style house and a log-and-brace-beam barn. Philip Marquart moved here from Amity Township, Pennsylvania, in the early 1800s and built a log cabin, then later the brick farmhouse.

The property was farmed by Marquart and Mercer families.
