= David Crabill House =

- U.S. National Register of Historic Places
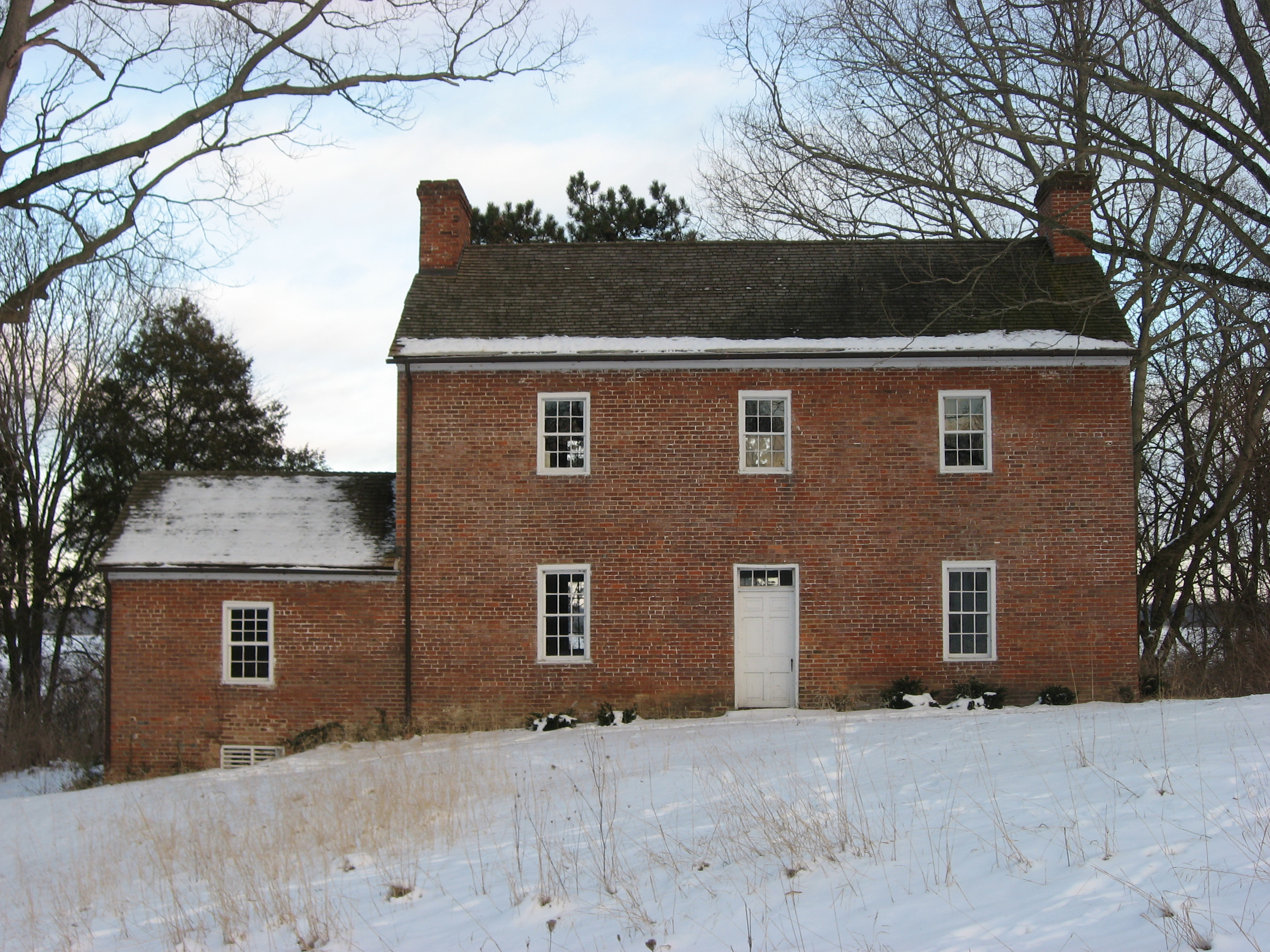

- Location within Ohio Location within the United States
- Location: 5 mi (8.0 km) east of Springfield off State Route 4, in Moorefield Township
- Coordinates: 39°57′39″N 83°44′52″W
- Area: 2 acres (0.81 ha)
- Built: c. 1825–30.
- Architectural style: Federal, Late Federal
- NRHP reference No.: 75001341
- Added to NRHP: October 10, 1975

The David Crabill House is a historic house in Moorefield Township, Ohio, built c. 1825–30 with Federal-style elements adapted to the frontier.

David Crabill and his wife were early settlers in the area, arriving in 1808.
