= Arcade Hotel (Springfield, Ohio) =

- U.S. National Register of Historic Places
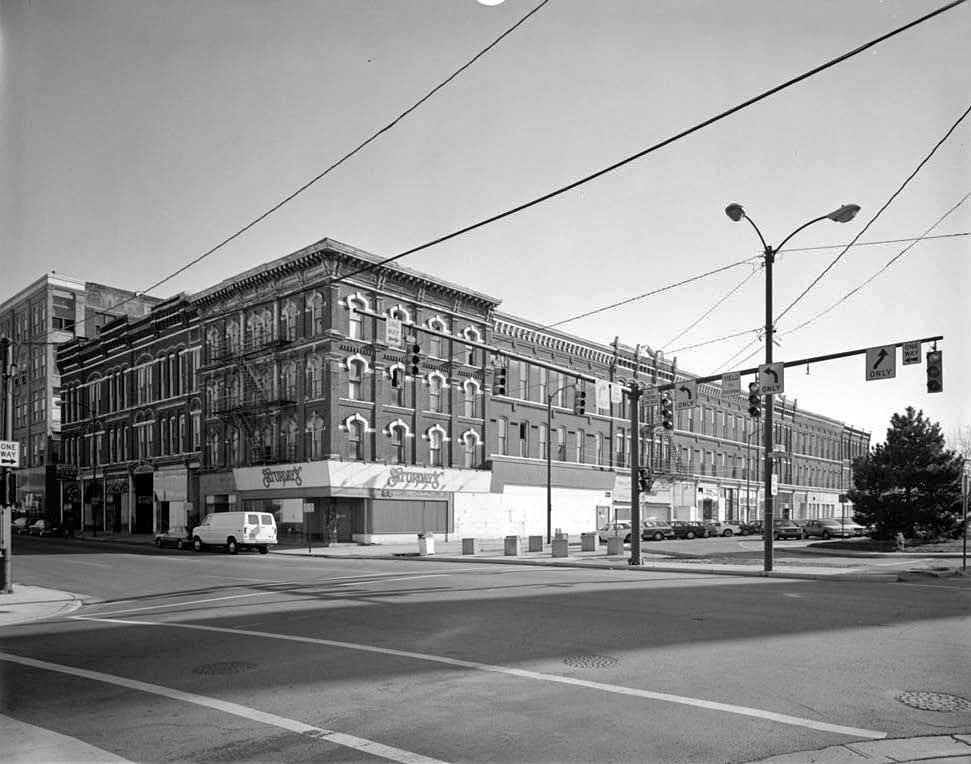
- Front and side of the hotel

- Location within Ohio Location within the United States
- Location: Fountain Ave. and High St., Springfield, Ohio
- Coordinates: 39°55′21″N 83°48′36″W
- Area: 1 acre (0.40 ha)
- Built: 1883
- Architect: Charles Cregar
- Architectural style: Italianate
- NRHP reference No.: 74001410
- Added to NRHP: October 16, 1974

The Arcade Hotel was a registered historic building in Springfield, Ohio, United States. It was listed on the National Register of Historic Places in 1974. The historic structure was demolished 1988 and a Courtyard by Marriott erected in its place.

== Historic uses ==
- Hotel
- Retail
- Business
- Manufacturing Facility
- US Post Office
- Railroad Station
