= Warder Public Library =

- U.S. National Register of Historic Places
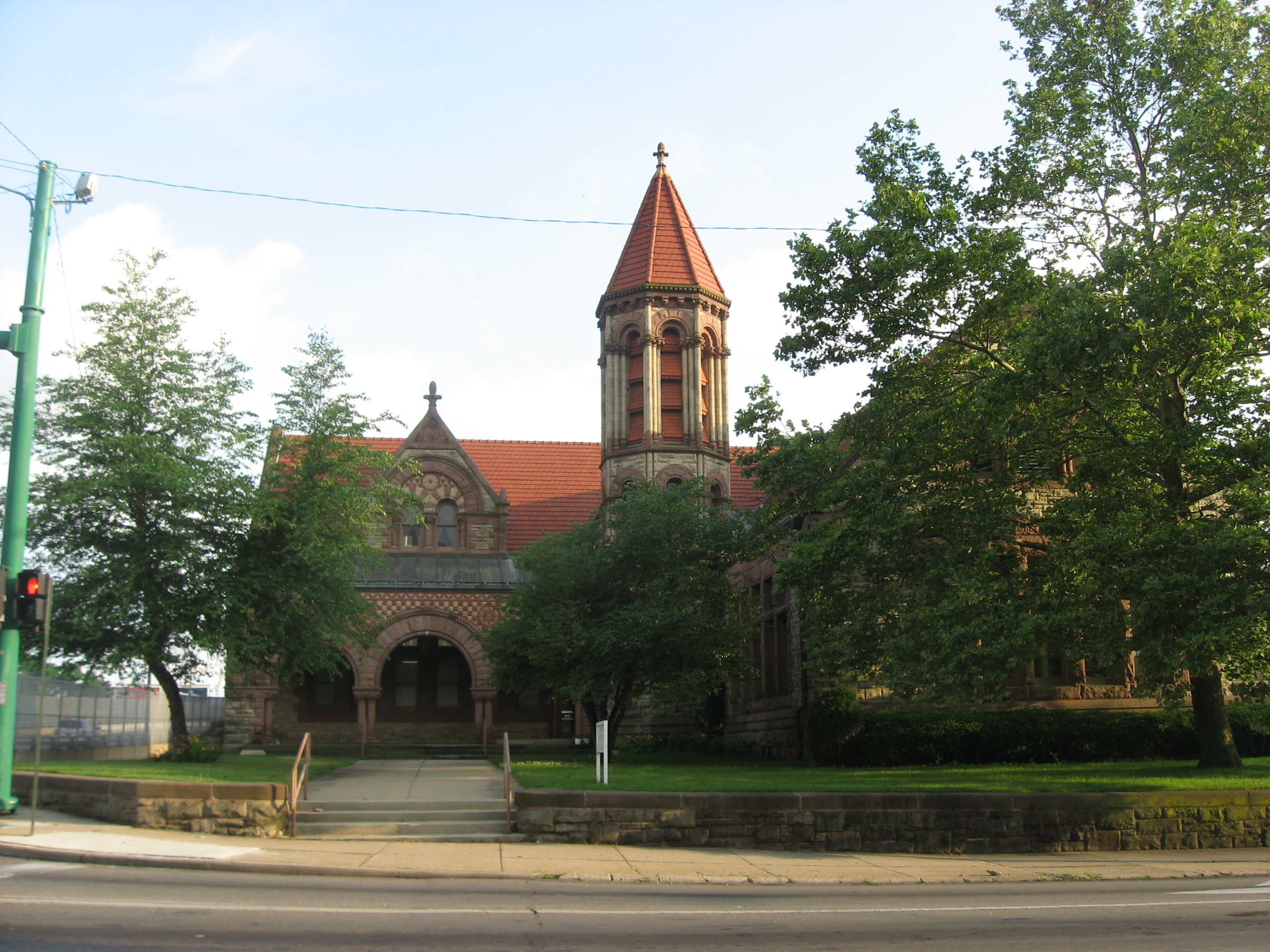
- Warder Public Library from E. High Street.

- Location within Ohio Location within the United States
- Location: 137 E. High St., Springfield, Ohio
- Coordinates: 39°55′22″N 83°48′26″W
- Built: 1890
- Architect: Shepley, Rutan and Coolidge
- Architectural style: Richardsonian Romanesque
- NRHP reference No.: 78002019
- Added to NRHP: February 17, 1978

Warder Public Library is a historically significant building in Springfield, Ohio, United States. A robust example of Richardsonian Romanesque architecture, it was a gift to the city from industrialist Benjamin H. Warder, and served as the main branch of the Clark County Public Library from 1890 to 1989. It now houses the Clark County (Warder) Literacy Center.

== History ==
Warder (1824–1894) was president of Warder, Bushnell & Glessner Company (established 1879), headquartered in Springfield, manufacturers of Champion harvesters and farm machinery. In 1902, Warder's company merged with four others — McCormick Harvesting Machine Company, Deering Harvester Company, Milwaukee Harvester Company, Plano Manufacturing Company — to form International Harvester.

Warder and his business partners, Asa S. Bushnell and John J. Glessner, each hired Boston architect Henry Hobson Richardson to design a house: the Warder Mansion in Washington, DC. (1885–88); the Bushnell Mansion in Springfield, Ohio (1885–88); and the John J. Glessner House in Chicago, Illinois (1885–87). Richardson died in 1886, but architects in his office completed the houses and formed a successor firm: Shepley, Rutan and Coolidge. Warder hired them to design the library.

The L-shaped building is located at the southwest corner of High Street and Spring Avenue. It is constructed of Ohio buff sandstone trimmed with Worcester brownstone, under an orange clay tile roof. The east wing features an arcaded entrance porch; at the juncture of the wings is a tower that contains the staircase. The main reading room features a massive stone fireplace, 18 feet tall and 12 1/2 feet wide. In plan and massing, the building is closely related to Richardson's Converse Memorial Library (1885) in Malden, Massachusetts.

Warder donated the building as a memorial to his parents. A plaque reads:

This library has been erected in memory of Jeremiah and Ann A. Warder by their son Benjamin Head Warder. It is given to the people of Springfield for their free enjoyment and is left in their charge forever. Dedicated June 12th, 1890.

In 1989, the Clark County Public Library moved to a modern facility at 201 South Fountain Avenue.

The Warder Public Library was added to the National Register of Historic Places in 1978.

== See also ==
- National Register of Historic Places listings in Clark County, Ohio
