= Armed Services Editions =

Books distributed in the U.S. military in World War II

US Serviceman Nunzio Antonio "Jim" Giambalvo reads an Armed Services Edition of A Tree Grows in Brooklyn.

Armed Services Editions (ASEs) were small paperback books of fiction and nonfiction that were distributed in the American military during World War II. From 1943 to 1947, some 122 million copies of more than 1,300 ASE titles were distributed to service members, with whom they were enormously popular. The ASEs were edited and printed by the Council on Books in Wartime (CBW), an American non-profit organization, in order to provide entertainment to soldiers serving overseas, while also educating them about political, historical, and military issues. The slogan of the CBW was: "Books are weapons in the war of ideas."

== History ==
After the draft was reinstated in the U.S. in 1940, millions of young soldiers found themselves in barracks and training camps, where they were often bored. The head of the Army's Library Section, Raymond L. Trautman, sought to remedy this by purchasing one book per soldier, but when that failed, librarians launched a nationwide book collection campaign. This "Victory Book Campaign" collected a million books in its first month, but its efforts dropped off when the Army rejected many of the donated books as unsuitable for soldiers, and the bulky hardcovers were found to be unsuitable for use in the field. The campaign ended in 1943.

In that year, in collaboration with the graphic artist H. Stanley Thompson and the publisher and CBW executive Malcolm Johnson, Trautman proposed his idea of "Armed Services Editions": mass-produced paperbacks selected by a panel of literary experts from among classics, bestsellers, humor books and poetry. The support of William Warder Norton, chairman of the CBW's executive committee and president of the publishing house W. W. Norton, was instrumental for the project to be realized. Apart from the Army and Navy (through chief librarian Isabel DuBois), over seventy publishers and a dozen printing houses collaborated on the ASEs. To appease some publishers' concerns, a legal commitment was made that prevented the domestic distribution and post-war resale of surplus books, and educational and scientific books were excluded.

The CBW appointed Philip Van Doren Stern, a printing expert and former Pocket Books executive, as project manager. The volunteer advisory panel that selected the books comprised notable figures from publishing and literature. Its initial members were John C. Farrar, William M. Sloane, Jeanne Flexner, Nicholas Wreden, Mark Van Doren, Amy Loveman and Harry Hansen. The panel met twice weekly, selecting publications from among the publishers' suggestions. It aimed at publishing 50 books per month, but soon reduced that goal to 30. The panel mainly focused on selecting recreational reading material, both fiction and nonfiction, primarily drawn from current publications and aiming at "all levels of taste within reasonable limits". The order of publication was chosen at random by pulling names out of a cookie jar; the first book to be printed was The Education of Hyman Kaplan by Leo Rosten.

"Surprisingly", according to John Y. Cole, the ASE series was free from official government censorship. But the Army and Navy chief librarians, Trautman and DuBois, made sure that all books were acceptable to both services, and rejected works with "statements or attitudes offensive to our Allies, any religious or racial group, or [...] not in accord 'with the spirit of American democracy'". The publication of Louis Adamic's Native's Return as an ASE title caused controversy because the novel's first edition had contained passages that were considered pro-Communist. Although these had been removed in later editions and the ASE version, Congressman George A. Dondero still protested against what he considered government distribution of "Communist propaganda". More serious problems for the ASE ensued when Title V of the Soldier Voting Act of 1944 limited the distribution of government-financed information to soldiers. The act was sponsored by Senator Robert A. Taft, who feared that the Roosevelt administration would distribute propaganda in favor of the president's reelection to a fourth term. The Army strictly enforced the act and, as a result, banned the ASE publication of Charles A. Beard's history The Republic and Catherine Drinker Bowen's O. W. Holmes biography Yankee from Olympus among other works. After vigorous public backlash, Congress amended the act to make it less restrictive.

Distribution of ASEs began in October of 1943 and continued until 1947. The books were issued to soldiers overseas, such as in hospitals and on transports, and air-dropped as part of the supplies destined for remote outposts. Notably, just before the invasion of Normandy, a mass distribution of ASE titles took place among the troops marshalled in southern England, and each man received a book as he embarked his invasion transport.

== ASE titles ==
Armed Services Editions were printed in pairs, one atop the other, to make most efficient use of the digest magazine presses. This rare "two-up" of Mark Twain's Huckleberry Finn and Country Lawyer by Bellamy Partridge was never cut apart by the printer, and its edges remain untrimmed.

The ASE program featured an array of fiction and non-fiction titles, including classics, contemporary bestsellers, biographies, drama, poetry, and genre fiction (mysteries, sports, fantasy, action/adventure, westerns). Most of these books were printed in unabridged versions. Authors included Hervey Allen, Robert Benchley, Stephen Vincent Benét, Max Brand, Joseph Conrad, A. J. Cronin, Carl Crow, Eugene Cunningham, James Oliver Curwood, Clyde Brion Davis, Walter D. Edmonds, Edward Ellsberg, William Faulkner, Peter Field, F. Scott Fitzgerald, C. S. Forester, Erle Stanley Gardner, Edmund Gilligan, Arthur Henry Gooden, Zane Grey, Ernest Haycox, MacKinlay Kantor, Frances and Richard Lockridge, Jack London, H. P. Lovecraft, William Colt MacDonald, John P. Marquand, Ngaio Marsh, W. Somerset Maugham, Clarence E. Mulford, John O'Hara, George Sessions Perry, Edgar Allan Poe, William MacLeod Raine, Eugene Manlove Rhodes, Craig Rice, Charles Alden Seltzer, Percy Bysshe Shelley, Luke Short, Thorne Smith, John Steinbeck, George R. Stewart, Bram Stoker, Grace Zaring Stone, Rex Stout, James Thurber, W. C. Tuttle, Mark Twain, H. G. Wells, and Philip Wylie.

The distinctive covers bore the description, "Armed Services Edition: This is the Complete Book – Not a Digest." Seventy-nine of the titles printed were abridged, usually for length rather than content, and their covers were marked to reflect this fact.

Over the life of the program, over 122 million copies of ASE books were printed. This makes the ASE program one of the largest wide-scale distributions of free books in history. 1,225 were unique titles and 99 were reprints of titles issued earlier in the series. 63 of the titles were "made books"; they were collections of short stories, poems, plays, essays, or radio plays, usually by the same author, that were assembled and published together for the first time.

The number of ASEs is given as 1,322 or 1,324 in different sources. The Library of Congress's catalog record lists 1,322 volumes and explains: "The last listed number is 1322, the discrepancy between that and the number 1324 mentioned in the title [of John Jamieson's 1948 history of the ASEs] probably being due to the use of sub-categories with non-consecutive numbers during the course of publication".

Lists of all ASEs have been published, among other works, in the appendices to the studies by Molly Guptill Manning (2014) and John Y. Cole (1984).

== Publishing ==
The small books were convenient for soldiers because they fit easily into a cargo pocket. Finished size varied slightly, from 5 1/2 in (14 cm) to 6 1/2 in (17 cm) long and from 3 7/8 in (9.8 cm) to 4 1/2 in (11 cm) high. Unlike traditional paperbacks, most of the ASEs were bound on the short side of the text block rather than the long side, due to the printing presses used. A few titles near the end of the series were published in traditional paperback format with the spine on the long side. A "two-up" process was frequently used to produce the books, in which the upper and lower halves of each page and the cover contained text from two different works. Once the entire volume was bound, it was cut in half across its width to separate the books.

Armed Services Editions were printed on digest and pulp magazine presses, usually in two columns per page for easier reading. Some ASEs were stapled along the binding, in addition to being glued, to make them sturdier. Because the Council on Books in Wartime made use of magazine presses to print ASEs when the presses were not in use, printing costs were low. The cost for printing was around 6 cents per copy, and royalties of one cent per copy were split between authors and publishers. This early experiment with mass paperback printing helped to prove the viability of paperback publishing in the United States.

== Popularity ==
ASEs were very popular in the armed forces. Copies were shared, re-read, and ripped into sections so they could accommodate two or more readers at once. A contemporary newspaper article recounted: "The hunger for these books, evidenced by the way they are read to tatters, is astounding even to the Army and Navy officers and the book-trade officials who conceived Editions for the Armed Services".

Soldiers wrote that the ASEs "are as popular as pin-up girls", or that "to heave one in the garbage can is tantamount to striking your grandmother". A study found that the most popular "deal frankly with sexual relations (regardless of tone, literary merit and point of view, no matter whether the book is serious or humorous, romantically exciting or drably pedestrian)". Authors received voluminous fan mail from the frontlines. ASEs were the first books some readers had picked up since high school, and for some, the first they had read cover to cover. Many authors perceived the selection of their book by the ASE as a great honor, and it contributed significantly to some of their careers.

== Post-war availability ==
Many Armed Services Editions remain available from used booksellers. The only complete collection of all ASE books is held at the Library of Congress. A near-complete set (lacking 16 titles) is in the library of the University of Alabama. Other American university libraries hold partial collections of up to several hundred books.

=== 2002 initiative ===
In November 2002, Andrew Carroll used a $50,000 corporate donation to print 100,000 copies of four new Armed Services Editions to active-duty American military personnel serving in combat zones overseas. The books were: William Shakespeare's Henry V, Sun Tzu's The Art of War, Allen Mikaelian's Medal of Honor: Profiles of America's Military Heroes from the Civil War to the Present, and Carroll's own War Letters: Extraordinary Correspondence from American Wars. They were published by Hyperion, Dover Publications and Washington Square Press. None of the books were on the original list of ASEs.
