= South Charleston =

South Charleston is the name of the following places in the United States of America:

- South Charleston, Ohio, a village
- South Charleston, West Virginia, a city

== See also ==
- South Charleston High School, Charleston, South Carolina
