= War Book Panel =

American Council on Books in Wartime entity (1941–1945)

The War Book Panel was created in 1942 during World War II by the Council on Books in Wartime to recommend books to the public that would assist in the goals of the war effort.

== Background ==
The Council on Books in Wartime decided to choose a limited selection of high quality books for the public that clarified why the United States was at war, what values were at stake, and the terms which peace might be extended.

Panel members included Irita Van Doren, editor of the New York Herald Tribune; Amy Loveman, associate editor of the Saturday Review of Literature; Lieutenant Colonel Joseph L. Greene, editor of the Infantry Journal; Admiral Harry E. Yarnell, retired; and J. Donald Adams, editor of the New York Times Book Review.

The panel met periodically and voted on titles. Selected books were republished and labeled "Imperative" of the front cover with an emblazoned large 'I'. Council members, which included publishers, were obligated to advertise these books even if they were published by a competitor. The project was quickly subsumed by internal controversy as publishers squabbled over the word "Imperative" - some publishers thought their books were more "imperative" than their competitors. Only six books were ever nominated by the war's end.

== Imperative books ==
The following books were republished as "Imperative" by the War Book Panel. Dates are when the book was chosen as Imperative, not the original publication date.

1. W. L. White, They Were Expendable. November 1942
2. John Hersey, Into the Valley. March 1943
3. Wendell Willkie, One World. May 1943
4. Walter Lippmann, U.S. Foreign Policy: Shield of the Republic. 1943
5. John Hersey, A Bell For Adano.
6. Edgar Snow, People on Our Side. September 1944

In the spring of 1945, the panel voted for Ralph Ingersoll's The Battle Is the Payoff, but the book was already selling well and the war was coming to an end so it was never officially republished as an Imperative book.
