= Clark County Public Library =

Coordinates: 39.922065°N 83.810642°W

Clark County Public Library is the public library of Clark County, Ohio, United States. It is based in Springfield, Ohio and has a collection of approximately 500,000 items.

== History ==
The Clark County Public Library traces its beginnings to the Springfield Lyceum in 1841 in Springfield, Ohio. Various short-lived library associations followed and the library found a more permanent home on the second floor of Black's Opera House. The library housed 3,300 volumes when it opened to the public at this location in 1872. As patronage and the collection expanded, the need for yet another move set in and the library relocated in 1877 to the second floor of the Union Hall Building, which was situated on what is today Fountain Avenue.

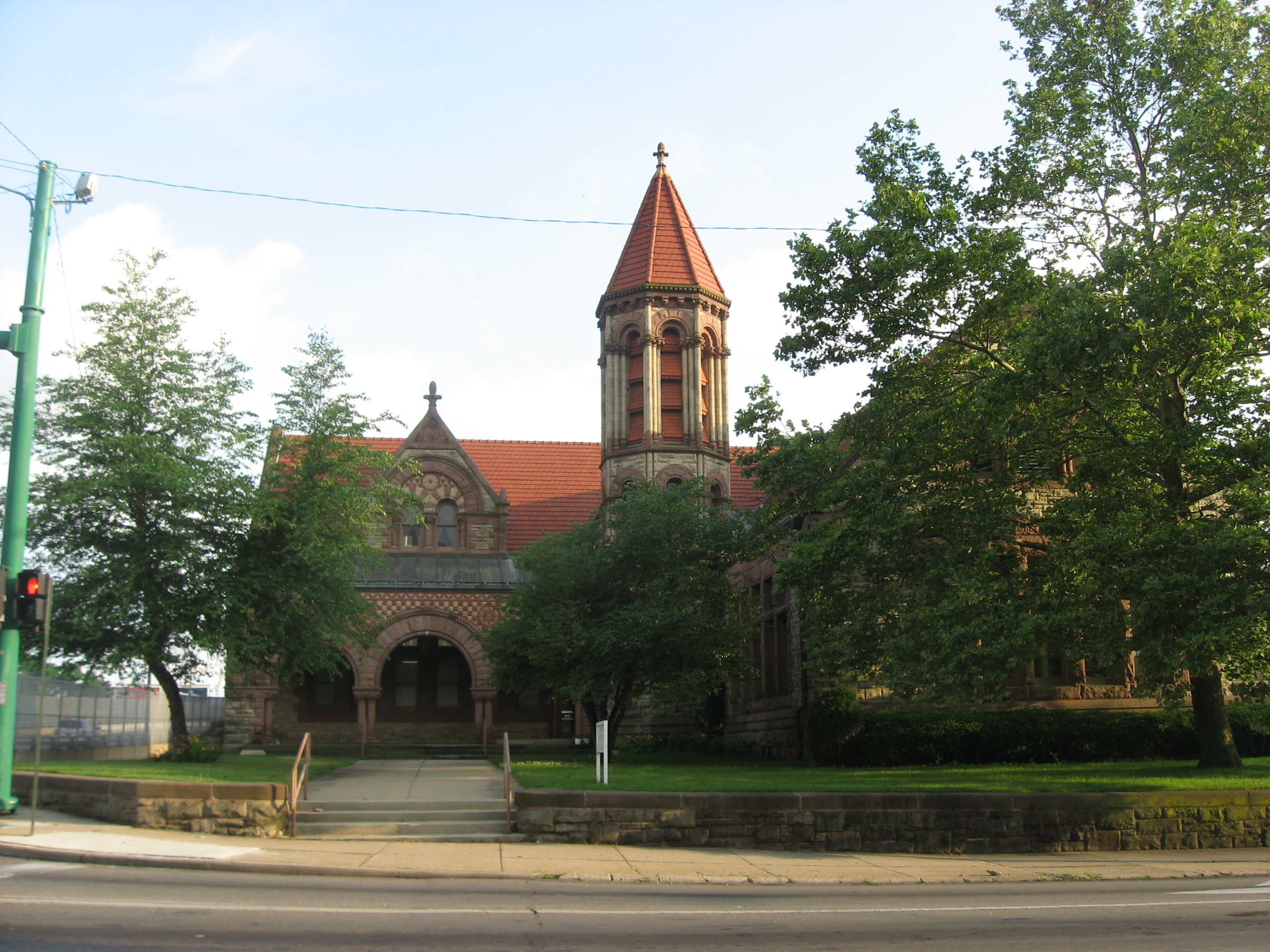
Warder Literacy Center, formerly the Warder Public Library

Local entrepreneur Benjamin H. Warder gave the library a new location on the corner of High Street in 1890, with a building constructed in memory of his parents and dedicated to the people of Springfield. This location now houses the Warder Literacy Center. Library service continued to expand and grow at this new location. The year 1936 saw the library's first bookmobile service to the area, with a homemade trailer that could carry 500 books. The 1950s and 1960s brought about the expansion of the library in the form of branches at Park Shopping Center, Southern Village Shopping Center, and in the villages of Enon and South Charleston.

The main library moved from the Warder Public Library to its new facility on Fountain Avenue in 1989. The library has five locations throughout Clark County. It also has two bookmobiles that cover 41 community stops, 7 schools, 14 daycare centers and 5 Head Start Programs.

The library's collection includes over 425,000 books, 425 magazine subscriptions, 4,000 CDs, over 3,000 DVDs and Blu-ray. Video Games for check-out (Xbox One, Xbox 360, PS3, PS4, Wii and Wii U), eBooks and magazines, many online resources such as Gale Courses, full (in library) access to Ancestry.com and framed art for check-out (Main Library).

The library offers many cultural and educational programs throughout the year at all of its branches. The Speaker Series (2000-2010) brought national and regional authors, artists, and lecturers to Springfield. Past participants included Sean Astin, Stan Lee, Maya Angelou, Dave Barry, Mary Higgins Clark, Doris Kearns Goodwin, and Elie Wiesel. The library's annual Summer Reading Program is popular with area children along with our weekly storytimes. Also on offer are different programs like LEGO Club, Teen TAC and Animanga Club, the Springfield Writes Local Author Fair, One-On-One Tech Classes and much more. A full listing of upcoming activities can be found on the library's web calendar at https://web.archive.org/web/20150925202523/http://www.ccpl.lib.oh.us/calendar. You can also connect with the library on Facebook at https://www.facebook.com/ClarkCountyPublicLibrary, Twitter at https://twitter.com/ClarkLibraryOH, and on Wordpress at https://clarkcopubliclibrary.wordpress.com/.

== Branches ==
- Main Library, Springfield, Ohio
- Park Branch, also in Springfield, Ohio
- Northridge Branch, also in Springfield, Ohio
- Southgate Branch, also in Springfield, Ohio
- Tuttle Branch, also in Springfield, Ohio
- Houston Branch, South Charleston, Ohio
- Indian Mound Branch, Enon, Ohio
- Bookmobile
- Former branches include the Southern Village Branch, which was replaced by the Southgate Branch in 2022

== See also ==
- Clark County, Ohio
- Public library
- Springfield, Ohio
