= Council on Books in Wartime =

American non-profit organization (1942–1946)

- Formation: 1942
- Dissolved: 1946
- Type: NGO
- Location: United States

The Council on Books in Wartime (1942–1946) was an American non-profit organization founded by booksellers, publishers, librarians, authors, and others in the spring of 1942 to channel the use of books as "weapons in the war of ideas" (the council's motto). It promoted the use of books to influence the thinking of the American people regarding World War II, to build and maintain the will to win, to expose the true nature of the enemy, to disseminate technical information, to provide relaxation and inspiration, and to clarify war aims and problems of peace.

== Members and partners ==
The Council co-operated with the Office of War Information (OWI) and other government agencies, but was itself a voluntary, unpaid, non-governmental organization.

Those involved on the Council included W. W. Norton of W. W. Norton & Company, Bennett Cerf of Random House, George A. Hecht of Doubleday & Co., and Mark Van Doren.

== Activities ==
The Council attempted to achieve its goals by acting as a clearinghouse for book-related ideas, by being an intermediary between the book-trade industry and government agencies, by offering advice to publishers, and by handling all forms of public relations including distribution of reading lists and pamphlets, lectures, radio programs, newsreels, and book promotion and publication.

In 1942, the Council created a War Book Panel to choose titles officially recommended by the council. These titles were republished by Council member publishers with a seal of approval, a large "I" on the front cover meaning an "Imperative" book. Six "Imperative" books were published between 1942 and 1945 (see War Book Panel).

=== Armed Services Editions ===
In the spring of 1943, the Council launched the effort for which it would become best known, the Armed Services Editions. By the time the program ended in 1947, it had printed 122,951,031 books, selling them to the government at an average cost of just over six cents a volume. The Armed Services Editions brought high-end books to a mass audience, and helped popularize the emerging paperback format. One of the most popular ASE books was A Tree Grows in Brooklyn (1943) by Betty Smith, and the ASE's distribution of F. Scott Fitzgerald's novel The Great Gatsby helped revive interest in the book. In 1944, the council launched Oversees Editions, Inc, a subsidiary aimed at distributing American books to civilian populations abroad, to promote a positive view of American culture.

== Dissolution ==
With the end of World War II, the Council on Books in Wartime ceased active operations on Jan 31, 1946 but maintained its corporate entities to deal with the dispersal of remaining funds and the safekeeping of records.
