= South Charleston, Ohio =

- Village
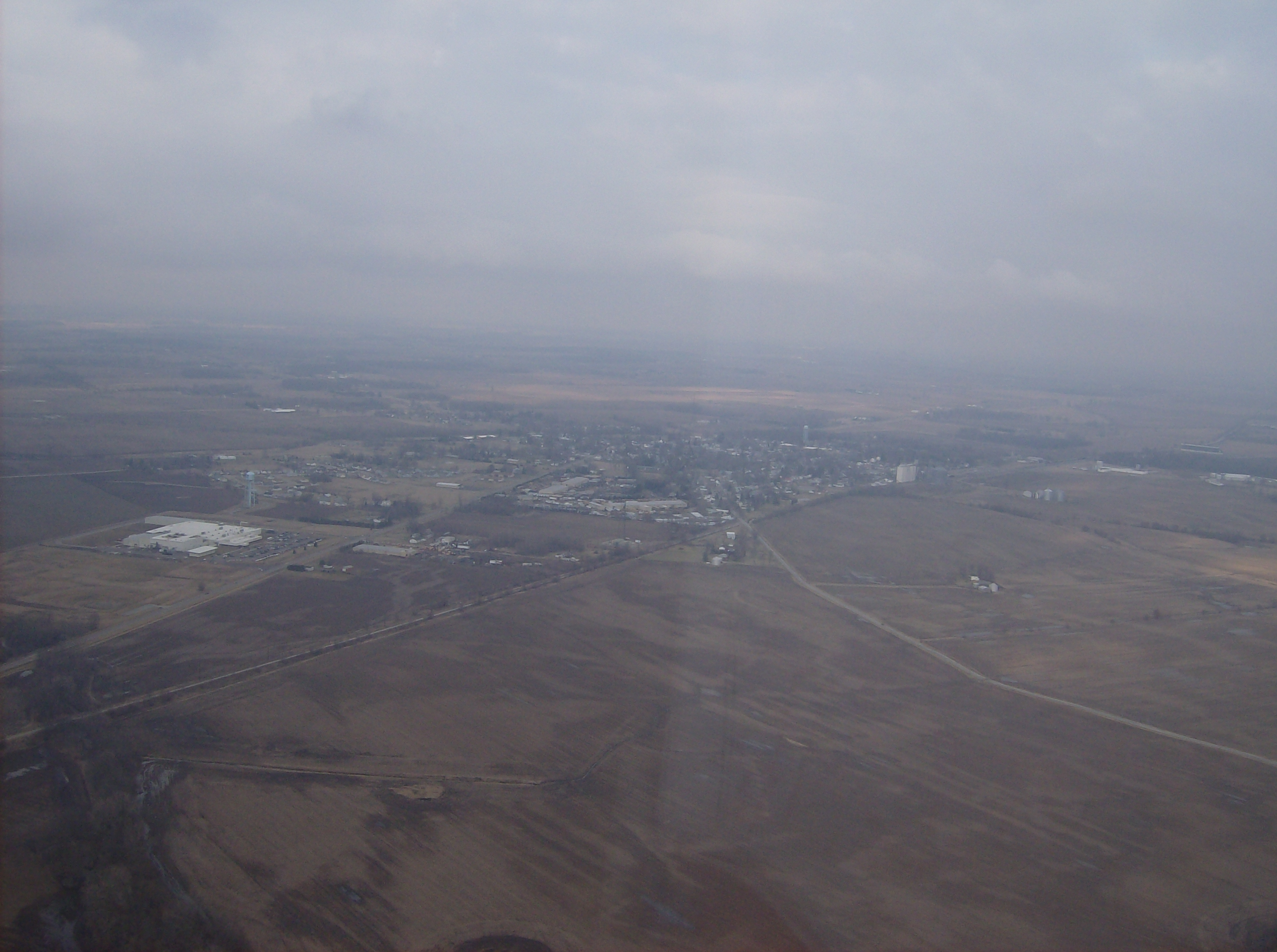
- South Charleston from the south

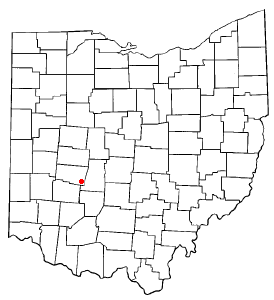
- Location of South Charleston, Ohio

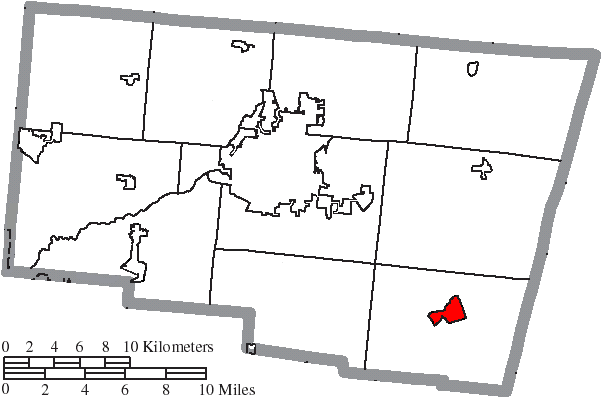
- Location of South Charleston in Clark County
- Coordinates: 39°49′27″N 83°38′30″W
- Country: United States
- State: Ohio
- County: Clark
- Township: Madison

Area
  - Total: 1.24 sq mi (3.20 km^{2})
  - Land: 1.23 sq mi (3.19 km^{2})
  - Water: 0 sq mi (0.00 km^{2})
- Elevation: 1,112 ft (339 m)

Population (2020)
  - Total: 1,706
  - Density: 1,383.2/sq mi (534.04/km^{2})
- Time zone: UTC-5 (Eastern (EST))
  - Summer (DST): UTC-4 (EDT)
- ZIP code: 45368
- Area codes: 937, 326
- FIPS code: 39-73124
- GNIS feature ID: 2399844
- Website: https://villageofsouthcharleston.org/

South Charleston is a village in Clark County, Ohio, United States. The population was 1,706 at the 2020 census. It is part of the Springfield, Ohio Metropolitan Statistical Area.

Despite its name implying that South Charleston is related to a city named Charleston, there is no city by that name in Ohio.

== History ==
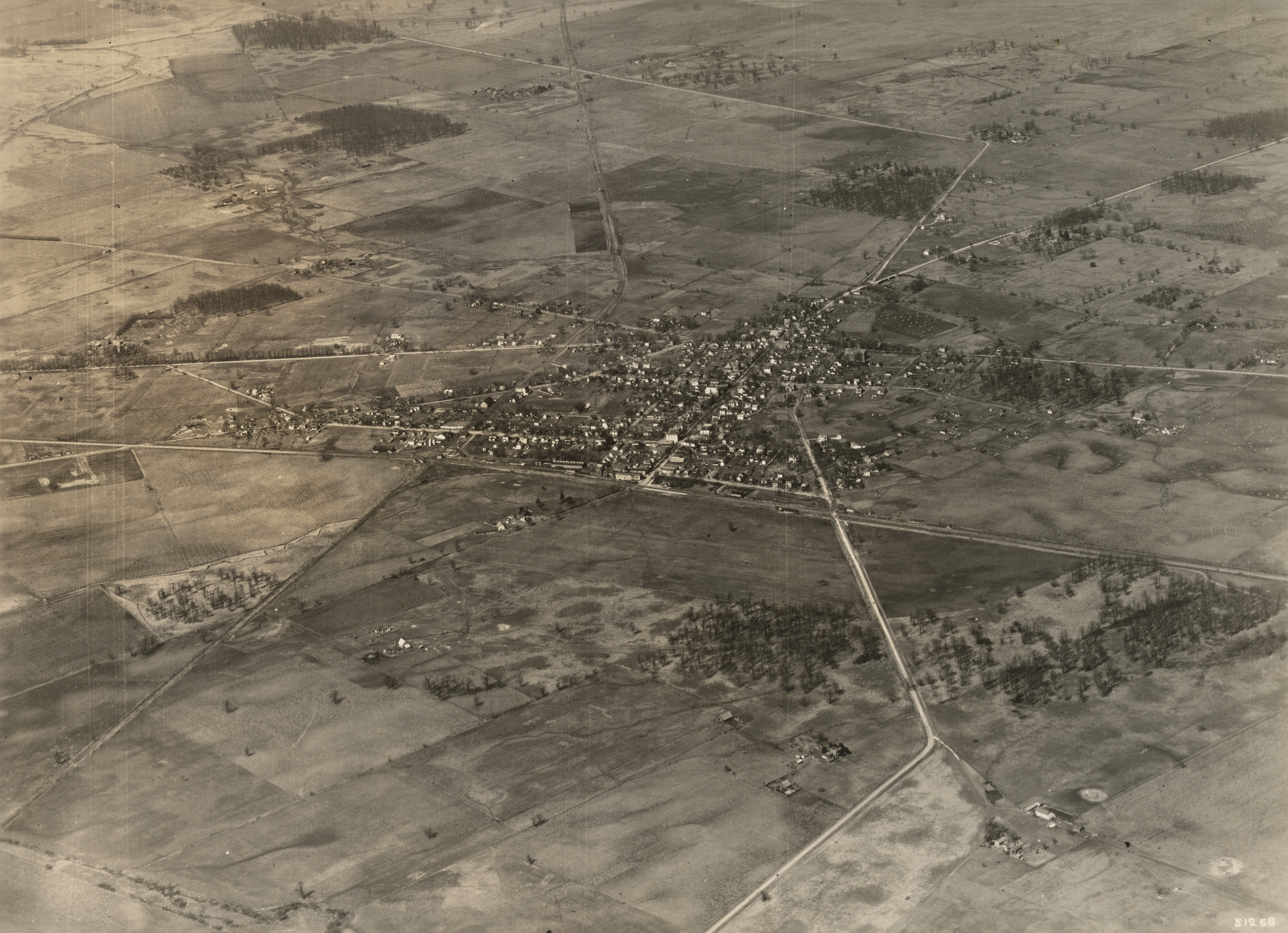
South Charleston in 1924

South Charleston was laid out in 1815. The first development was the plat of Charleston on November 1, 1815, becoming a matter of record in London on February 5, 1816, followed by the first election on September 19, 1818. The village was originally named after its first merchant, Charles Paist. However it was subsequently changed due to persistent mail difficulties.

== Geography ==
According to the United States Census Bureau, the village has a total area of 1.28 square miles (3.32 km^{2}), all of it land.

== Demographics ==
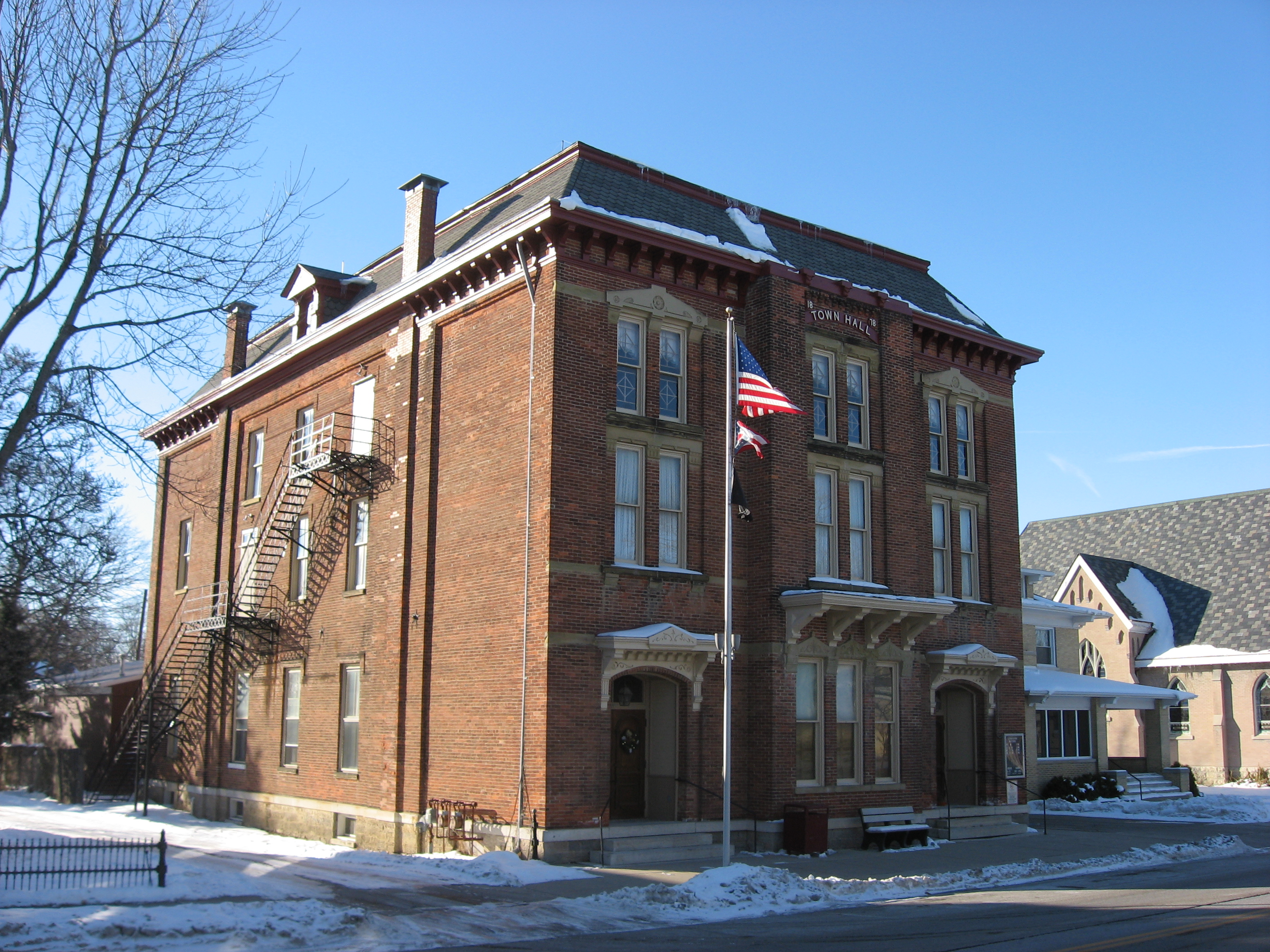
South Charleston Village Hall

Historical population
Census	Pop.	Note	%±
1830	102		—
1850	413		—
1860	515		24.7%
1870	818		58.8%
1880	932		13.9%
1890	1,041		11.7%
1900	1,096		5.3%
1910	1,181		7.8%
1920	1,267		7.3%
1930	1,208		−4.7%
1940	1,198		−0.8%
1950	1,452		21.2%
1960	1,505		3.7%
1970	1,500		−0.3%
1980	1,682		12.1%
1990	1,626		−3.3%
2000	1,850		13.8%
2010	1,693		−8.5%
2020	1,706		0.8%
U.S. Decennial Census

=== 2010 census ===
As of the census of 2010, there were 1,693 people, 720 households, and 466 families living in the village. The population density was 1,322.7 inhabitants per square mile (510.7/km^{2}). There were 793 housing units at an average density of 619.5 per square mile (239.2/km^{2}). The racial makeup of the village was 97.6% White, 0.4% African American, 0.1% Asian, 0.4% from other races, and 1.5% from two or more races. Hispanic or Latino of any race were 0.9% of the population.

There were 720 households, of which 31.1% had children under the age of 18 living with them, 45.8% were married couples living together, 14.2% had a female householder with no husband present, 4.7% had a male householder with no wife present, and 35.3% were non-families. 31.1% of all households were made up of individuals, and 12.6% had someone living alone who was 65 years of age or older. The average household size was 2.35 and the average family size was 2.89.

The median age in the village was 38 years. 25% of residents were under the age of 18; 9.3% were between the ages of 18 and 24; 24.1% were from 25 to 44; 25.5% were from 45 to 64; and 16.2% were 65 years of age or older. The gender makeup of the village was 47.5% male and 52.5% female.

=== 2000 census ===
As of the census of 2000, there were 1,850 people, 732 households, and 519 families living in the village. The population density was 1,426.0 inhabitants per square mile (550.6/km^{2}). There were 792 housing units at an average density of 610.5 per square mile (235.7/km^{2}). The racial makeup of the village was 96.81% White, 1.51% African American, 0.32% Native American, 0.49% Asian, 0.05% Pacific Islander, 0.05% from other races, and 0.76% from two or more races. Hispanic or Latino of any race were 0.16% of the population.

There were 732 households, out of which 37.8% had children under the age of 18 living with them, 53.0% were married couples living together, 13.1% had a female householder with no husband present, and 29.0% were non-families. 25.8% of all households were made up of individuals, and 11.5% had someone living alone who was 65 years of age or older. The average household size was 2.53 and the average family size was 3.02.

In the village, the population was spread out, with 28.8% under the age of 18, 9.5% from 18 to 24, 28.2% from 25 to 44, 21.0% from 45 to 64, and 12.5% who were 65 years of age or older. The median age was 34 years. For every 100 females there were 87.8 males. For every 100 females age 18 and over, there were 82.2 males.

The median income for a household in the village was $38,352, and the median income for a family was $46,364. Males had a median income of $32,685 versus $23,813 for females. The per capita income for the village was $16,940. About 7.0% of families and 8.4% of the population were below the poverty line, including 6.9% of those under age 18 and 6.1% of those age 65 or over.

== Education ==
The village is served by a public high school, Southeastern Local High School, and a public elementary/middle school, Miami View Elementary School. South Charleston has a public library, a branch of the Clark County Public Library.
