= Warder Mansion =

Historic house in Washington, D.C., United States

- U.S. National Register of Historic Places
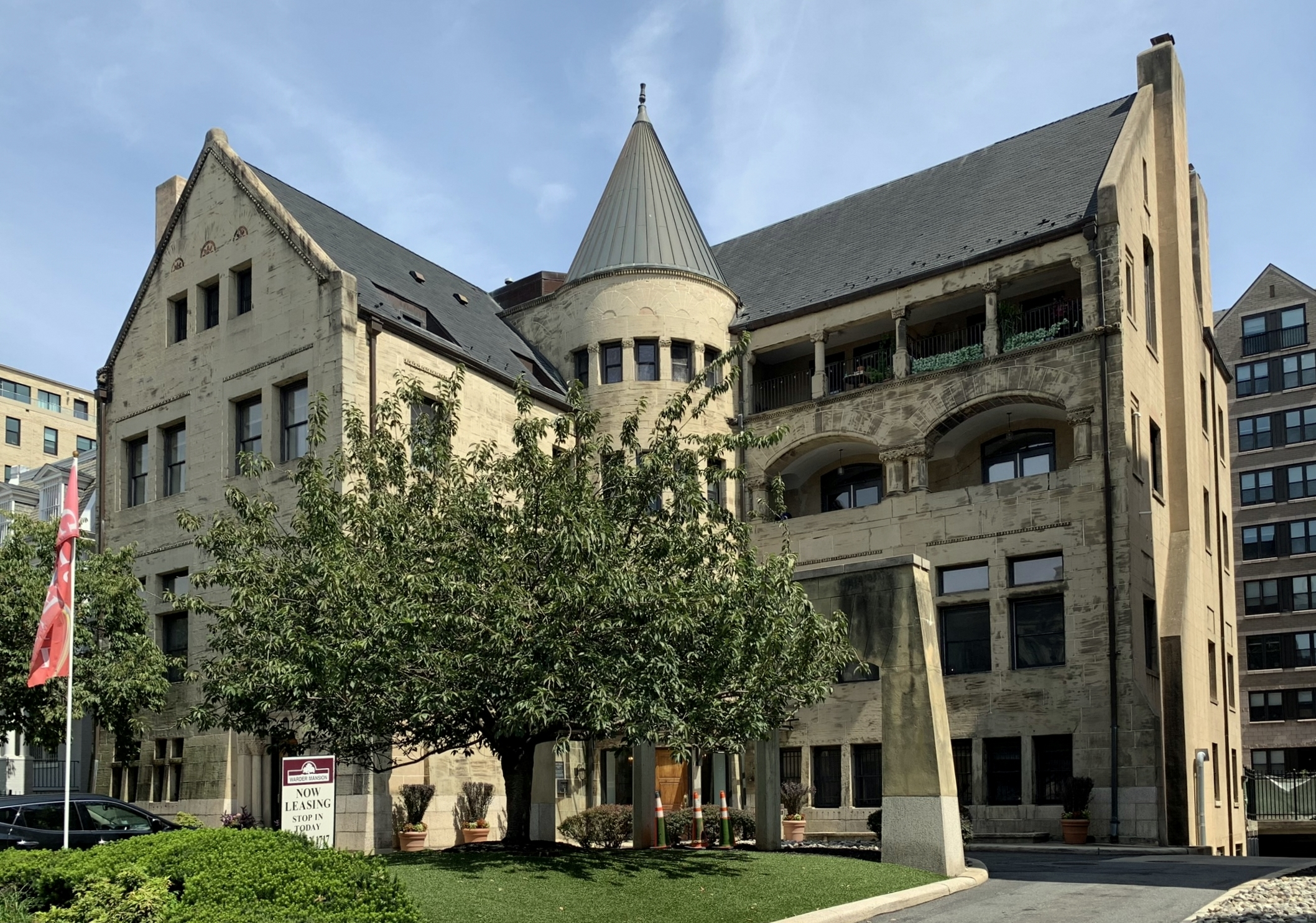
- Warder Mansion in 2023

- Location within Washington, D.C.
- Location: 2633 16th Street NW; Washington, D.C.
- Coordinates: 38°55′26.4″N 77°2′9.96″W
- Built: 1885–88 rebuilt 1923–25
- Architect: H. H. Richardson
- NRHP reference No.: 72001437

Warder Mansion (also known as Warder-Totten House) is an apartment complex at 2633 16th Street Northwest, in the Meridian Hill neighborhood of Washington, D.C. It is the only surviving building in the city designed by architect Henry Hobson Richardson. In an early example of preservation commitment, the building was saved from demolition in the 1920s by being disassembled and moved 1.5 miles (2.4 km) north of its original site. In the 1990s, the Warder-Totten House's prospects for survival again looked bleak, but the building was saved a second time.

The Warder-Totten Building was the home of the Antioch School of Law from 1972 to 1988.

== Warder ==
Benjamin H. Warder was president of Warder, Bushnell & Glessner Company, a major manufacturer of farm machinery. It was one of five companies merged in 1902 to form International Harvester.

In 1885, Warder hired Boston architect H. H. Richardson to design his house at 1515 K Street NW. Richardson died in 1886, but his firm completed the house in 1888. Warder died in 1894, and his widow occupied the house until 1921.

== Totten ==
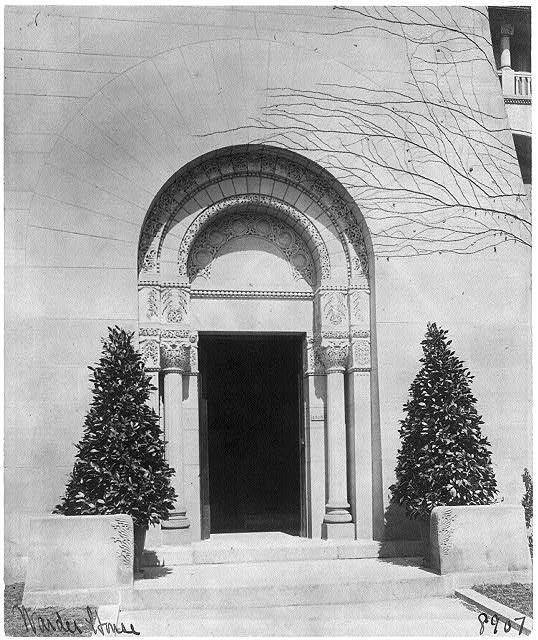
Front doorway, circa-1900.

In 1923, the Warder House was about to be demolished to erect an office building. Architect George Oakley Totten Jr. bought the exterior stone (except the front doorway, which reportedly went to the Smithsonian) and much of the interior woodwork. He transported the building, piece by piece (reportedly in a Model T Ford), to its present Meridian Hill site, reassembled it over two years, and converted it into an apartment house. The reconstructed building later housed the National Lutheran Council and the Antioch College of Law.

The building was listed on the D.C. Inventory in 1964, and on the National Register in 1972.

Antioch College moved out in 1986. The building was vacant for more than a dozen years, and was largely reduced to a shell by fires and vandalism. It was placed on the D.C. Preservation League's Most Endangered Places List in 1996, and remained on that list for several years.

Renovated in 2001–02, it now serves as the entrance to Warder Mansion, a complex of 38 one- and two-bedroom apartments carved out of the house and a 9-story addition.

== Furniture ==
The Warder house once contained custom-made furnishings.

Warder's daughter Alice (1877–1952) married diplomat John Work Garrett (1872–1942) at the house in December 1908, with First Lady Edith Roosevelt in attendance. Ambassador Garrett eventually inherited his family's Baltimore mansion, "Evergreen," and subsequently moved some of the furnishings there. Evergreen eventually became Johns Hopkins University's Evergreen Museum & Library; its Warder pieces include a set of three Thomas Sheraton-inspired chairs and an ornately inlaid center table from the D.C. house's drawing room, and a handsome pair of possibly-architect-designed "throne" chairs carved with sunflowers, an ornate "W," and the year 1887.

One of the Warder dining chairs is in the collection of the Metropolitan Museum of Art.

== Gallery ==
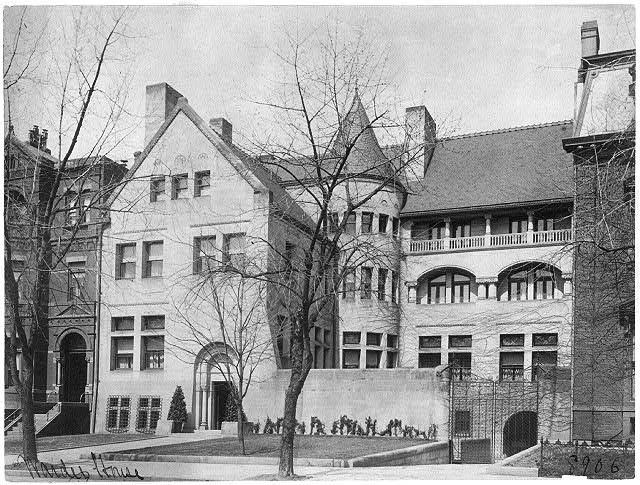
Warder House, at 1515 K Street NW, circa 1900.

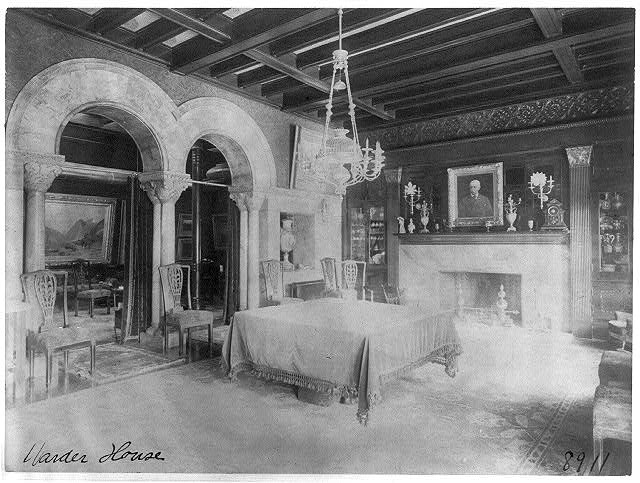
Warder dining room, circa 1900.

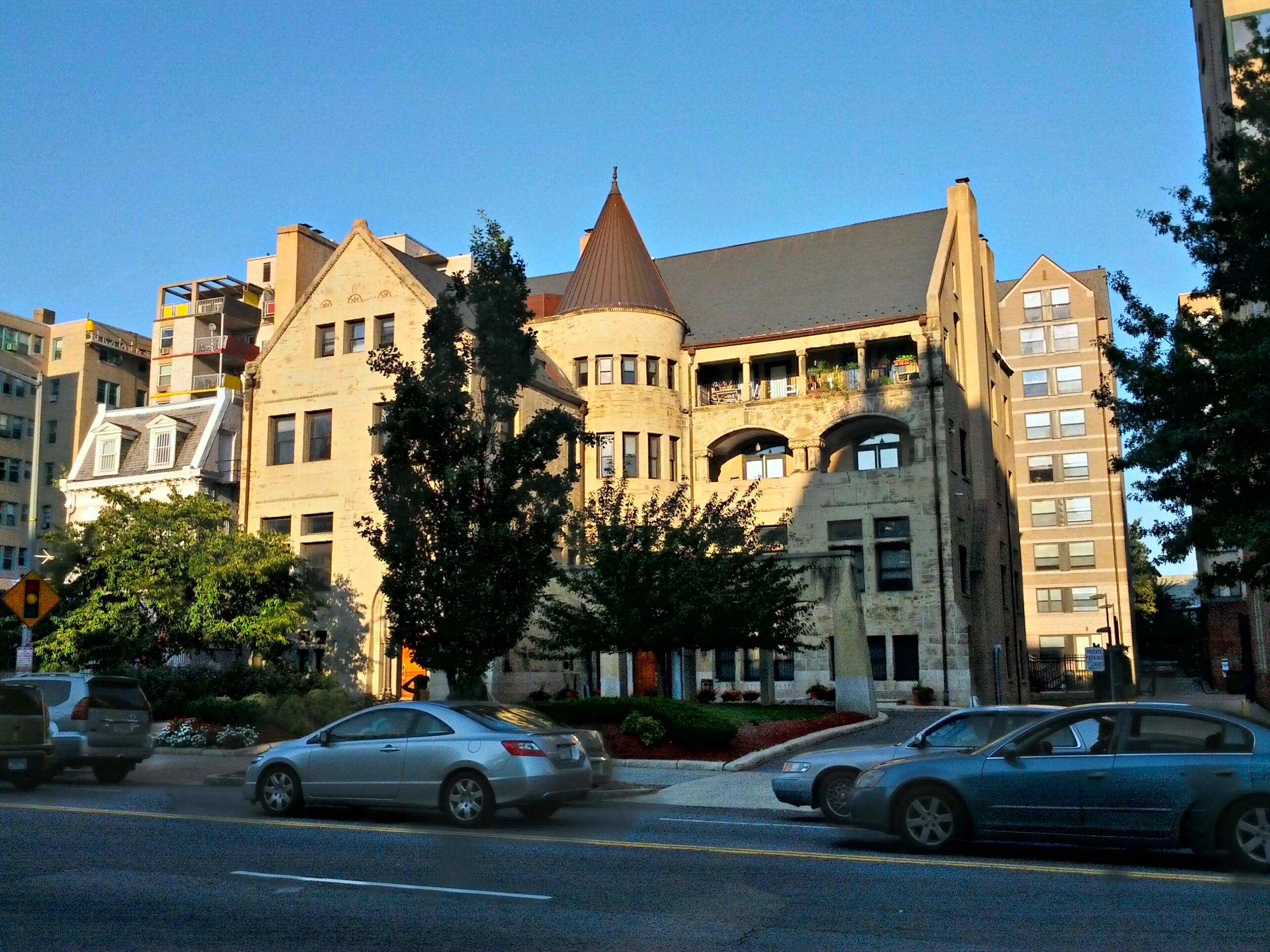
Warder Mansion Apartments in 2012. Note the 9-story rear addition, right.

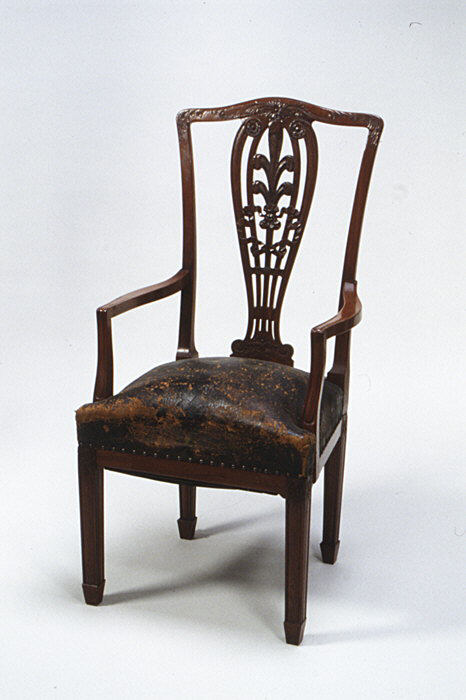
Colonial Revival armchair (1886–88), by Francis H. Bacon for A. H. Davenport and Company, Metropolitan Museum of Art.

== See also ==
- National Register of Historic Places listings in the upper NW Quadrant of Washington, D. C.
