= William Warder Norton =

American publisher (1891–1945)

- Born: September 17, 1891; Springfield, Ohio, U.S.
- Died: November 7, 1945 (aged 54); New York City, New York, U.S.
- Education: Ohio State University
- Occupations: Publisher; social worker
- Known for: co-founder of W. W. Norton & Company
- Spouse: Mary Dows Herter (m. 1922)
- Children: 1
- Relatives: Benjamin H. Warder (grand uncle)

William Warder Norton (September 17, 1891 – November 7, 1945) was a publisher and co-founder of W. W. Norton & Company.

== Early life ==
William Warder Norton was born on September 17, 1891, in Springfield, Ohio, to Emily (née Warder) and Percy Norton. His father was a salesman and patent lawyer in Springfield. His maternal grandfather William Warder was also a lawyer. His grand uncle was Springfield manufacturer Benjamin H. Warder.

Norton's mother died when he was two. He attended schools in Springfield. He graduated from St. Paul's School in Concord, New Hampshire. He attended Ohio State University for three years and was secretary of the Panhellenic Council at the college. He left college in 1912.

== Career ==
In 1912, Norton became foreign sales manager for Kilbourne & Jacobs Manufacturing. After four years, he worked for Harrisons & Crosfield, an English trading firm based in Philadelphia and traveled internationally, including Australia, in that role. He served as an ensign in the Naval Overseas Transport Service with the United States Navy during World War I.

Following the war, Norton worked in social services for Greenwich House. In 1921, he became secretary of the American Association of Social Workers. He then became affiliated with The New School for Social Research and Cooper Union. He started the non-profit People's Institute Publishing Company with his wife and began publishing lectures delivered at the People's Institute, including those of Everett Dean Martin, in 1923. In 1926, he became a full-time publisher.

Norton founded W. W. Norton & Company with his wife and acquired manuscripts from notable American academics. He served as its president and editor-in-chief. His vision for the company was to publish "the best books we can lay our hands on and then keep our hands on them as long as may be". He was president of the National Association of Book Publishers from 1934 to 1935. He was commander of the Willard Straight Post of the American Legion. During World War II, he was chairman of the Council on Books in Wartime. He was charged with how to distribute paper and binding materials during wartime and books to soldiers in the field. His phrase "books are weapons in the war of ideas" was used later by President Franklin D. Roosevelt.

== Personal life ==
Norton married Mary "Polly" Dows Herter, daughter of physician Christian A. Herter, on June 6, 1922. They had one child, Anne Aston Warder. He had interests in design and architecture, and built a home in Wilton, Connecticut. He also had a home on Lexington Avenue in Manhattan. At the time of his death, he owned 65 acres (26 ha) of farmland in Springfield, Ohio.

Norton went by his middle name Warder in his business life. He was close friends with artist Lyonel Feininger. He died on November 7, 1945, at Doctors Hospital in New York City.
