= Benjamin H. Warder =

American businessman (1824–1894)

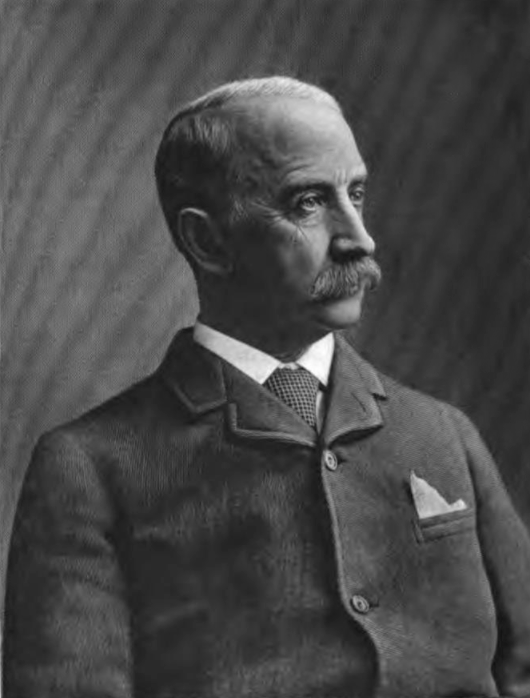
- Born: November 15, 1824; Philadelphia, Pennsylvania, U.S.
- Died: January 13, 1894 (aged 69); Cairo, Egypt
- Resting place: Rock Creek Cemetery; Washington, D.C., U.S.
- Occupation: Industrialist
- Relatives: William Warder Norton (grand nephew)

Benjamin Head Warder (Note: He had an uncle of the same name, Benjamin H. Warder (1796-1857), Philadelphia, PA merchant; and a nephew of the same name, Benjamin H. Warder (1866-1897), buried in Ferncliff Cemetery, Springfield, OH.) (November 15, 1824 – January 13, 1894) was an American manufacturer of agricultural machinery, based in Springfield, Ohio, for much of his career. After he had retired, in 1902 the company he co-founded merged with four others to form International Harvester. (Note: The other companies were McCormick Harvesting Machine Company, Deering Harvester Company, Milwaukee Harvester Company, and Plano Manufacturing Company.) Warder commissioned and donated a new library (now the Warder Public Library) for Springfield in 1890, as a memorial to his parents.

After retiring from his business in 1886 and moving to Washington, D.C., Warder purchased some large estates in areas then considered "country" and developed them for new residential subdivisions in Northwest Washington. Four were later combined in 1908 for the neighborhood now known as Park View. Warder died in Cairo in 1894, while traveling in Egypt.

== Youth ==
Benjamin Head Warder was born as one of the nine children of Jeremiah Warder (1780–1849) and his wife Ann (née Aston) (1784–1871), Quakers from Philadelphia, Pennsylvania. They settled in Springfield, Ohio, by the time of the 1830 United States census. Jeremiah had been a member of his father's shipping firm, John Warder & Sons (later Warder Brothers). John Warder had invested in Ohio land, and bequeathed Jeremiah $10,000 in land.

== Career ==
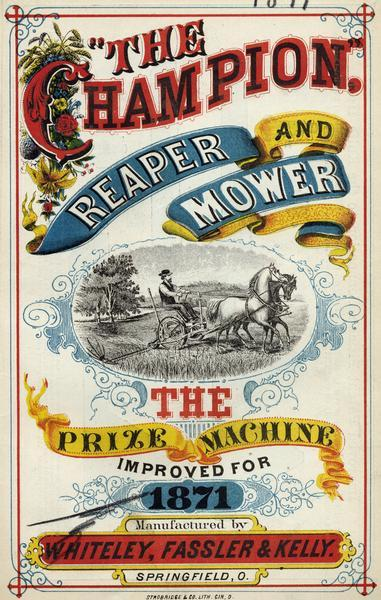
"Champion" farm machinery was distributed by multiple companies.

In 1850, Benjamin Warder co-founded Warder, Brokaw & Child Company. He paid $30,000 for patent rights to "The Champion," a combined reaper & mower invented by William N. Whiteley. Warder's company manufactured the machines, but in the beginning he shared distribution with Whiteley and others. By 1860, the Springfield firm was operating as Warder & Child. In 1866, it was reorganized as Warder, Mitchell & Company, with John J. Glessner and Asa S. Bushnell as junior partners. Senior partner Ross Mitchell retired in 1880, and the firm became Warder, Bushnell & Glessner Company.

It manufactured harvesting machinery – reapers, binders, mowers and hay rakes – under the "Champion" brand name. Warder and Bushnell managed the factories in Springfield, which covered 20 acres. The company opened a branch office in Chicago in 1865, headed by Glessner. This developed as its most profitable, growing along with that major city: in 1871, the Chicago office sold about 800 machines; in 1884, it sold 25,000 machines. By 1886, the company employed more than 1,000 workers, and was exporting to foreign countries. In 1908, the 2,000,000th Champion machine was sold.

Springfield was nicknamed "The Champion City" after this company's brand name.

== Retirement ==
After Warder retired from business in 1886, he moved his family to Washington, D.C., and built a house at 1515 K Street NW. Boston architect Henry Hobson Richardson is credited with the design, but died four months into the project. Richardson's successor firm, Shepley, Rutan and Coolidge, completed the house in 1888.

Upon moving to Washington, Warder entered real estate development. He purchased the late Asa Whitney's country estate of Whitney Close from the heirs of Catherine M. Whitney on June 4, 1886, for the sum of $60,024. He subdivided the 43-acre tract into building lots for a new development named Whitney Close. This was followed by the subdivision and development of other "country" properties in the area. These subdivisions: including Whitney Close, Schuetzen Park, and Bellevue, were organized into a single neighborhood known as Park View in 1908. Park View's Warder Street commemorates Warder's role as real estate developer.

As a memorial to his parents, Warder commissioned Shepley, Rutan and Coolidge to design a new public library for Springfield, Ohio. Warder Public Library was begun in 1887 and completed in 1890.

Warder commissioned a speculative office building, designed by architect Nicholas T. Haller and constructed at 9th & F Street NW, Washington, DC (1892).

== Personal life ==
Warder married Ellen Nancy Ormsby and they had three daughters:

- Elizabeth (Betsey), married Ralph Nicholson Ellis (February 15, 1906);
- Ellen Nancy, married Ward Thoron (November 15, 1893, divorced 1911); married Major Henry Leonard (July 27, 1914);
- Alice (1877–1952), married John W. Garrett (December 24, 1908).

Warder had a mansion on Avondale Avenue in Springfield, Ohio. His grand nephew was publisher William Warder Norton.

Warder died in Cairo on January 13, 1894, while on a trip to Egypt. His body was returned to the United States and interred in a vault in Rock Creek Cemetery. His bronze sarcophagus weighed 3,500 lbs and was cast by the Gorham Manufacturing Company of Elmwood, Rhode Island. It was designed by Philip Martiny, in collaboration with architects Shepley, Rutan, and Coolidge.

== Legacy ==
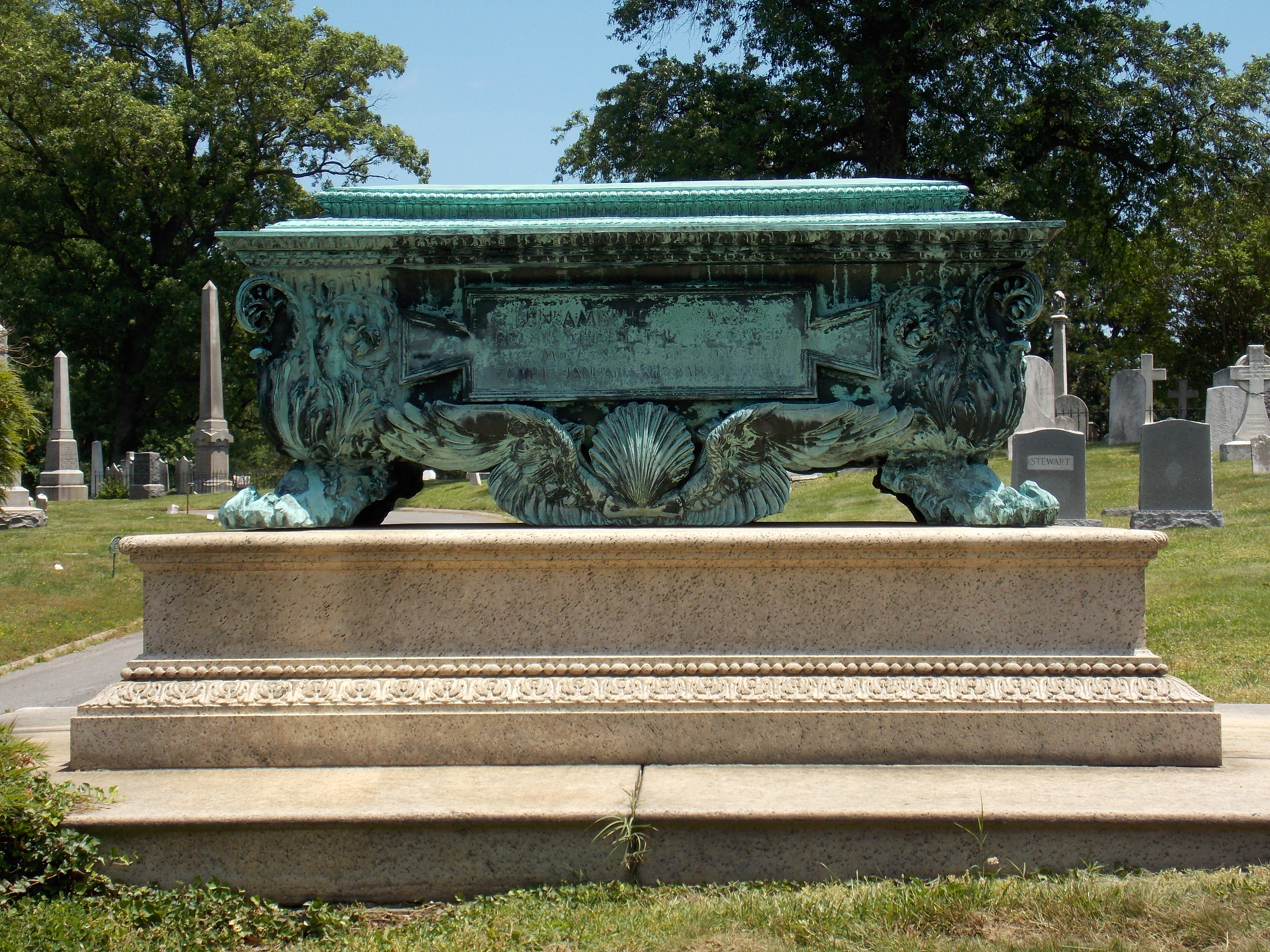
Benjamin Head Warder tomb

- Warder Mansion, 1515 K Street NW, Washington, DC (1885–88), H. H. Richardson, architect. In 1923, the house was disassembled and relocated to 2633 16th Street NW.
- Warder Public Library, Springfield, Ohio (1887–90), Shepley, Rutan and Coolidge, architects.
- Tomb of Benjamin H. Warder, Rock Creek Cemetery, Washington, DC (1898), Shepley, Rutan and Coolidge, architects.
- In 1920, Warder's widow donated a collection of American sculpture to the Smithsonian Institution, including works by William Henry Rinehart and Hiram Powers.

Benjamin's grandmother Ann (Head) Warder wrote a series of journals; they mention his grandfather and father. These are now held by the Pennsylvania Historical Society.
