= John J. Glessner House =

Historic house in Chicago, Illinois

Glessner House
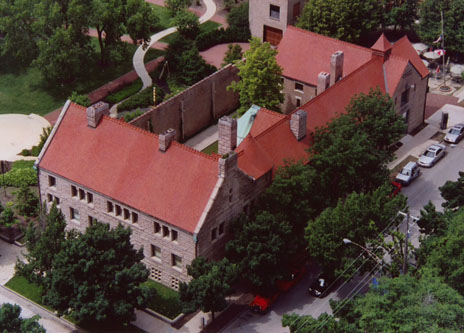
- Aerial view of the Glessner House

- Location in Near South Side, Chicago John J. Glessner House (Illinois) John J. Glessner House (the United States)
- Established: 1971
- Location: 1800 South Prairie Avenue, Near South Side, Chicago, Illinois
- Coordinates: 41°51′27.39″N 87°37′15.78″W
- Type: Historic house museum
- Director: William Tyre
- President: Tori Simms
- Website: www.glessnerhouse.org
- John J. Glessner House
- U.S. National Register of Historic Places
- U.S. National Historic Landmark
- Chicago Landmark
- Area: 13,070 ft²
- Built: 1886–1887
- Architect: Henry Hobson Richardson
- Architectural style: Romanesque, Richardsonian Romanesque
- NRHP reference No.: 70000233

Significant dates
- Added to NRHP: April 17, 1970
- Designated NHL: January 7, 1976
- Designated CHICL: October 14, 1970

The John J. Glessner House, operated as the Glessner House, is an architecturally important 19th-century residence located at 1800 S. Prairie Avenue, Chicago, Illinois. Built during the Gilded Age, it was designed in 1885–1886 by architect Henry Hobson Richardson and completed in late 1887. The property was designated a Chicago Landmark on October 14, 1970. The site was listed in the National Register of Historic Places on April 17, 1970, and as a National Historic Landmark on January 7, 1976, and is maintained as a house museum.

== John J. Glessner ==
John Jacob Glessner (1843–1936) was a partner in the firm of Warder, Bushnell & Glessner, a farm machinery manufacturer headquartered in Springfield, Ohio. Immediately after his marriage in 1870 to Frances Macbeth, Glessner relocated to Chicago where he opened a branch office. In 1902, the firm and four others, including firms controlled by J. P. Morgan, Cyrus McCormick, and James Deering, merged to form International Harvester (now known as Navistar International Corporation), which became the fourth largest corporation in the country. Glessner was appointed vice president and continued in that capacity for many years. He died in 1936 at the age of 92. John Glessner was the father of two children; his son George died as a young man and his daughter became the forensic scientist Frances Glessner Lee.

During the late 19th century, Chicago's most prestigious residential street was Prairie Avenue on the South Side. Enjoying economic success, Glessner decided to build a home for his family on Prairie Avenue and 18th Street. He chose one of the young nation's foremost architects, H. H. Richardson.

== Henry Hobson Richardson ==
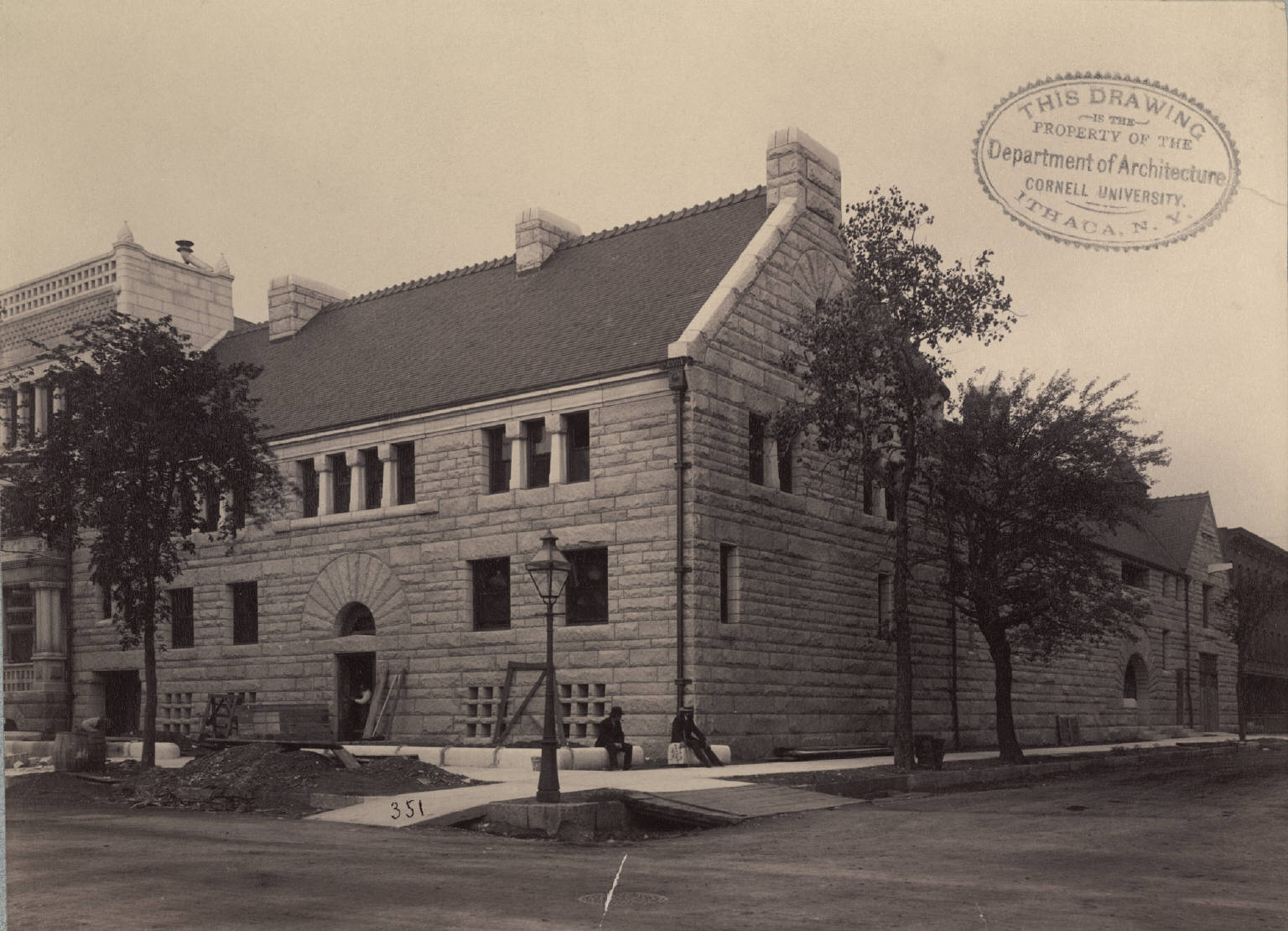
Glessner House in 1887, as construction was being completed. Original photo from Cornell University Library.

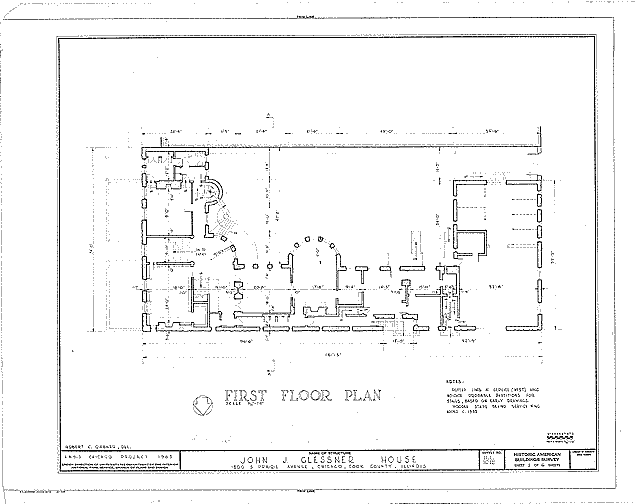
Glessner House, first floor plan, from HABS.

Eager to develop a style of architecture that would reflect what he saw as the musculature of the fast-growing United States, the late-19th-century architect Henry Hobson Richardson developed what would be called the Richardsonian Romanesque style. The Richardsonian Romanesque style took elements of European Romanesque architecture from buildings constructed in the 11th and 12th centuries, and adapted them to American idioms.

For example, the heavy, rough-cut facing stones of Romanesque architecture were no longer necessary for engineering reasons. Architects and builders had discovered more efficient ways for walls to distribute and bear a building's weight. Richardson believed that what was no longer necessary for function could be made to serve a new purpose of form, by creating a new visual language of individual separation and privacy.

Richardson finished the house's design three weeks before his death in April 1886; construction was completed in 1887.

== The significance of the Glessner House ==
The innovative floor plan and design of the Glessner house rank it as one of the most important residential commissions of the 19th century. The walls of the house are pushed close to the lot lines, allowing for a spacious private courtyard within. The courtyard allowed abundant natural light to enter the main rooms of the house through south-facing windows, and also provided a level of privacy rarely achieved in urban residences. Additionally, a long servant hall is placed along the north side of the house, buffering the family spaces from the noise and dirt of 18th Street as well as the brutal winter winds. The exterior of the house is clad in Braggville granite, laid in courses of various heights, giving the house a strong horizontal appearance. Ornamentation is minimal, and includes an arch of stylized foliage over the front entrance and a series of carved capitals on the second floor columns. The design was distinctly different from the other houses on Prairie Avenue, and many neighbors did not understand it. Sleeping-car CEO George Pullman, who lived across the street in a traditional Second Empire mansion, said, "I do not know what I have ever done to have that thing staring me in the face every time I go out of my door."

== Later history ==
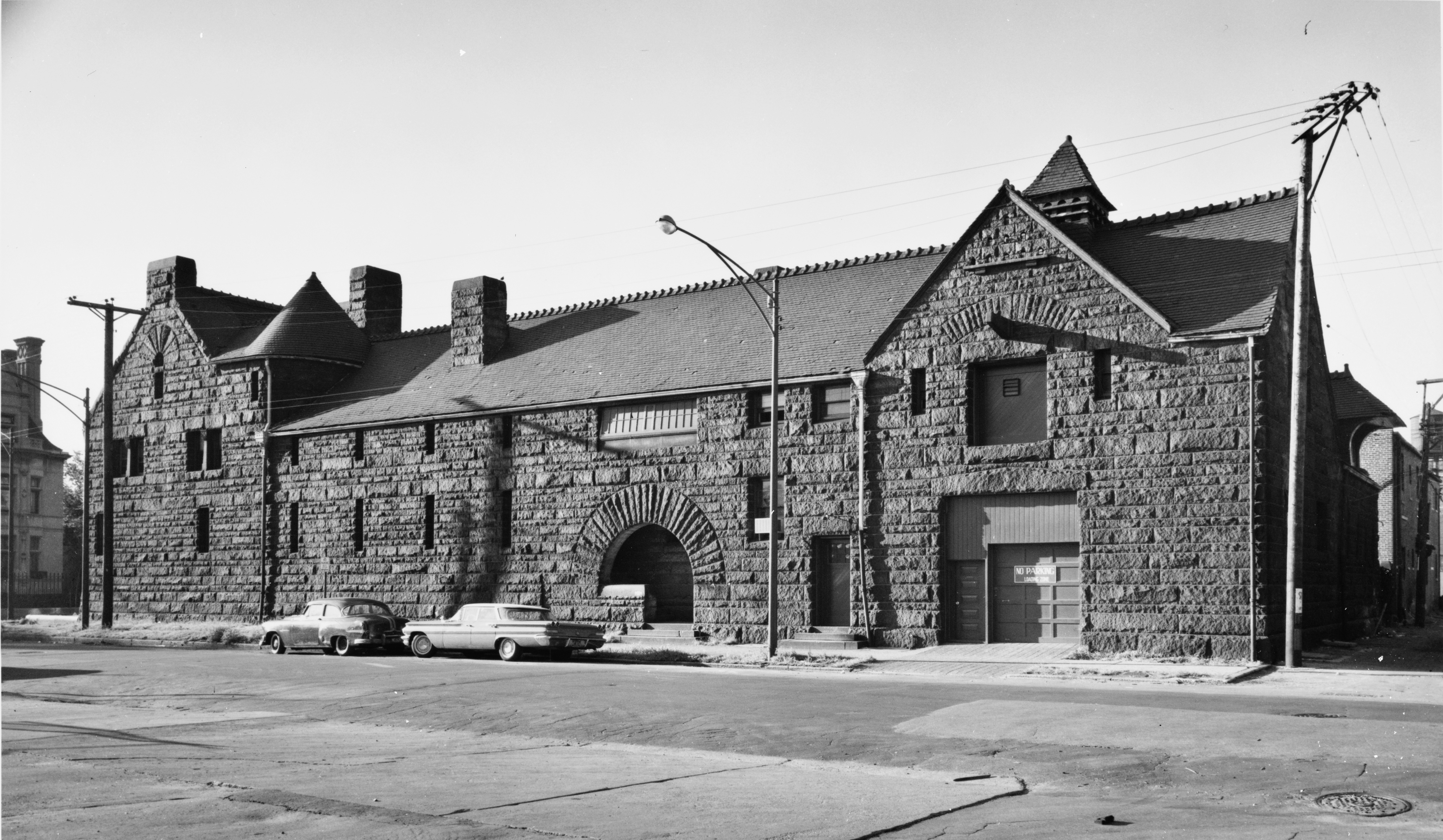
Glessner House, 18th Street facade, from HABS. Photo: 1963.

After John Glessner died in 1936, the house was given to the American Institute of Architects, who returned it to the family when they decided they could not afford the upkeep necessary. In 1937, the family deeded the house to the Armour Institute (precursor to the present day Illinois Institute of Technology). In 1945 the Institute leased the house to the Lithographic Technical Foundation, which installed large printing presses in many of the rooms and conducted research for the printing industry. When the Foundation moved to Pittsburgh in the early 1960s, the house was threatened with demolition. The Chicago Architecture Foundation was founded in 1966 as the Chicago School of Architecture Foundation in order to save Glessner House. Eventually a group of architects – including Phyllis Lambert, Philip Johnson, Dirk Lohan, Ben Weese and Harry Weese – and preservation-minded citizens banded together to save the house, and purchased it in 1966 for just $35,000. Richard Nickel, a noted Chicago preservationist was also involved with saving the house. Within a few years, the Glessner descendants began returning original furnishings.

== Today ==
The house opened for public tours in 1971. It has been maintained with the help of admission fees and substantial private donations from individuals and foundations including the Richard H. Driehaus Foundation, the Alphawood Foundation, the Tawani Foundation, and the Francis Beidler Foundation.

Many of the rooms have been accurately restored to their original appearance. The collection of decorative objects and furnishings is especially significant, as the Glessners were sophisticated collectors of both English and American arts and crafts. Objects and furniture by William Morris, William De Morgan, Émile Gallé, Isaac Scott, A.H. Davenport and others are found throughout the house. The Glessner House Museum, a nonprofit 501(c)(3) corporation, was formed in 1994 to administer the property; it operates under the name Glessner House. Several thousand people visit the site annually for tours and programs.

== See also ==
- List of Chicago Landmarks
- List of National Historic Landmarks in Illinois
- National Register of Historic Places listings in Central Chicago
- Henry B. Clarke House adjoins Glessner House
- Rocks Estate, Glessner's summer estate in New Hampshire
