= Amy Loveman =

American editor and critic (1881–1955)

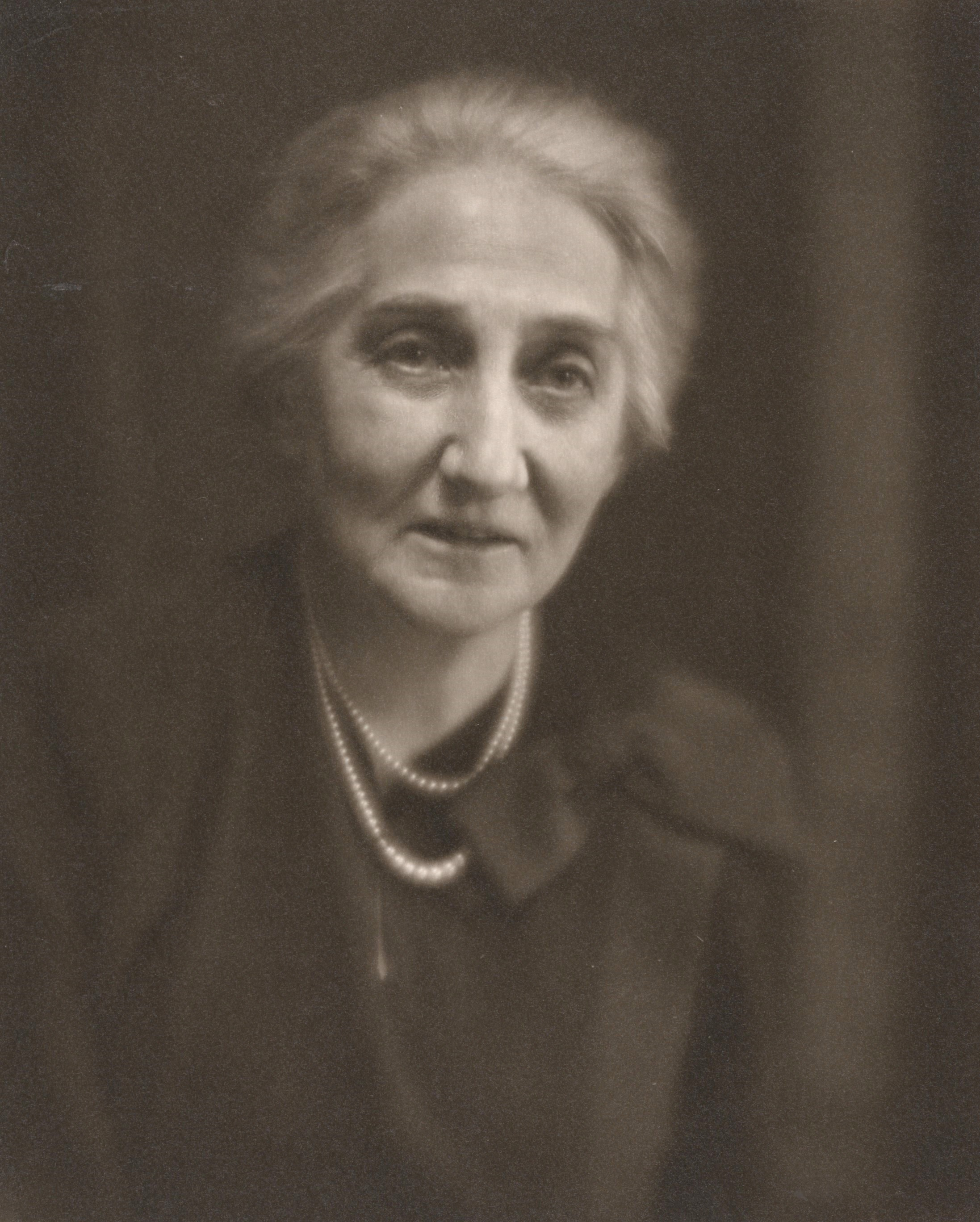
- Portrait of Loveman by Clara Sipprell (1940)
- Born: May 16, 1881; New York City
- Died: December 11, 1955 (aged 74); New York City
- Occupations: Editor; Critic
- Employer: Saturday Review of Literature

Amy Loveman (16 May 1881 – 11 December 1955) was an American editor and critic, best known for her work as a founding editor of the Saturday Review of Literature and for her work at the Book-of-the-Month Club.

Loveman earned her B.A. in 1901 from Barnard College, and her first job in the literary world was revising The New International Encyclopedia. Soon after, she began working at the New York Evening Post as a book reviewer and eventual associate editor for the newspaper's literary review section. In 1924, Loveman and three of her Post colleagues founded the magazine Saturday Review of Literature. While she started as an associate editor, she worked at the magazine for three decades and became the official poetry editor in 1950, writing over 800 contributions, such as editorials, reviews, and responses to readers' questions, in her first two decades alone at the Review.

Soon after Book-of-the-Month Club was founded in 1926, Loveman joined their reading committee and became the head of the Club's editorial department in 1939, in conjunction with her position at the Saturday Review of Literature. Her editorial role heavily involved selecting books for the Club and even writing reviews frequently. She became a member of the Club's editorial board in 1951. According to the Jewish Women's Archive, Loveman was "the ideal book review editor" who had a "vital role in the Book-of-the-Month Club, selecting great books to introduce to new readers."

Loveman was awarded both the Columbia University Medal for Excellence and the Constance Lindsay Skinner Achievement Award for the Women's National Book Association in 1946.

== Selected publications ==
- Saturday Papers: Essays on Literature from “The Literary Review,” with Henry Seidel Canby and William Rose Benét (1921).
- Designed for Reading: An Anthology Drawn from “The Saturday Review of Literature,” 1924–1934, with Henry Seidel Canby, William Rose Benét, Christopher Morley, and May Lamberton Becker (1934).
- I'm Looking for a Book (1936).
- Varied Harvest: AMiscellany of Writing by Barnard College Women, with Fredrica Barach and Marjorie M. Mayer (1953).
