= Dayton Arcade =

- U.S. National Register of Historic Places
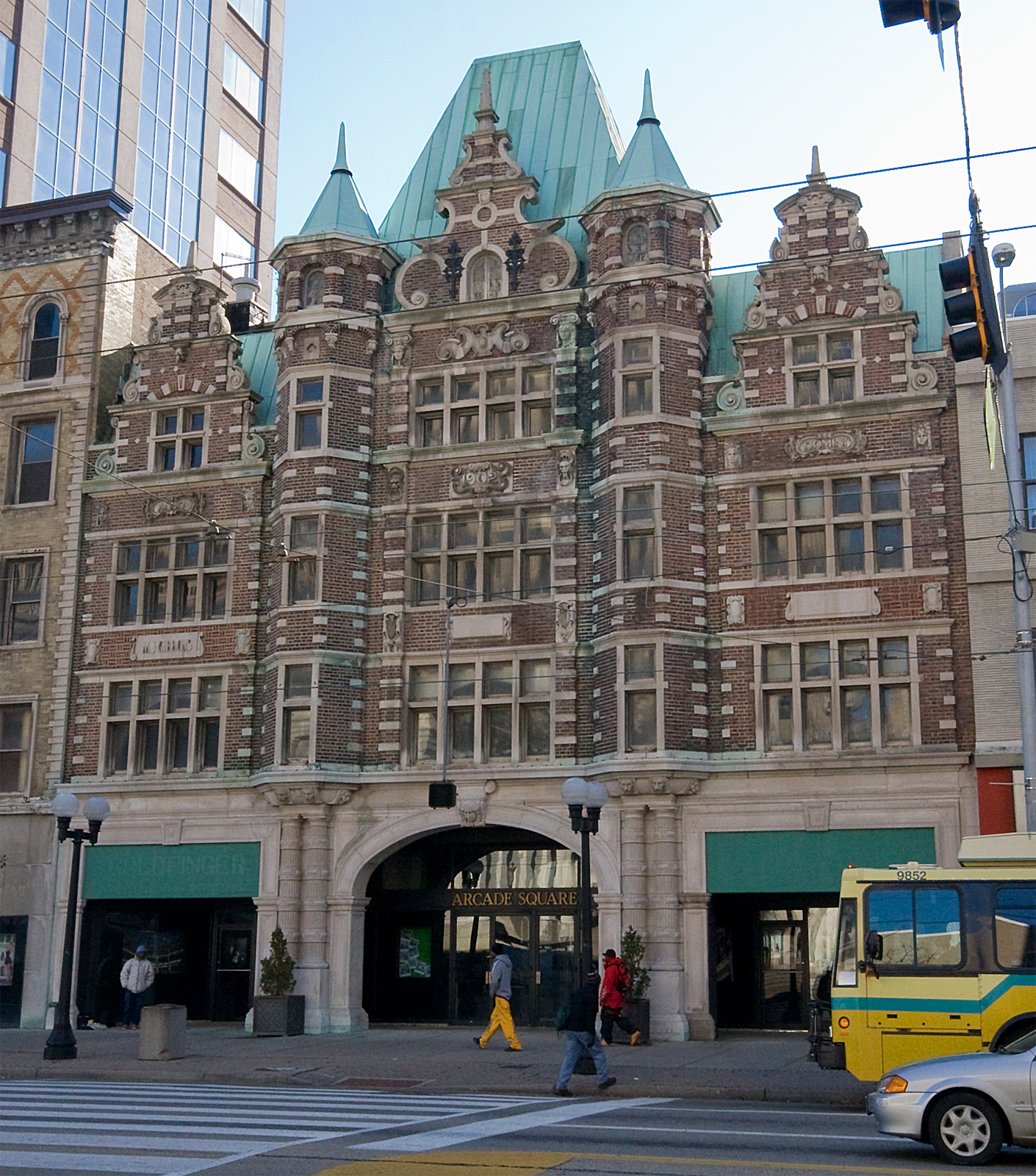
- Third Street Entrance

- Location within Ohio Location within the United States
- Location: Dayton, Ohio
- Coordinates: 39°45′30″N 84°11′33″W
- Built: 1902
- Architect: Frank Mills Andrews
- Architectural style: Renaissance
- NRHP reference No.: 75001498
- Added to NRHP: June 18, 1975

The Dayton Arcade is a collection of nine historic buildings in Dayton, Ohio. The architecturally elegant complex in the heart of Dayton's central business district was built between 1902 and 1904. It was conceived by Eugene J. Barney of the Barney & Smith Car Company and consists of nine interconnecting buildings topped by a glass-domed rotunda, 70 feet (21 m) high and 90 feet (27 m) in diameter (detailing around the dome includes oak leaves and acorns, grain, rams' heads, wild turkeys, and cornucopia), below which two balconied upper floors circle the central enclave. As president of the Arcade Company, Barney made sure the Arcade had the latest innovations, including elevators, a power plant and a cold-storage plant. The architect was Frank M. Andrews, known also as architect for many of NCR's factory buildings (notable for their use of progressive fenestration) and the American Building (originally Conover) at Third and Main Streets in Dayton.

== Background ==
The most notable building fronts are on Third Street. It is of Flemish façade design and is said to be patterned after a guildhall in Amsterdam, the Netherlands. It looks like typical old Dutch architecture. The Fourth Street and Ludlow Street facades are done in Italian Renaissance Revival with the Commercial Building anchoring the corner of the lot. The most interesting architectural feature is the great dome, which was 90 ft. across and 70 ft. high. The classic detailing usually found in such rotundas was replaced by detailing representing Ohio. The cornucopias are filled with fruit and vegetables from Ohio. There are festoons of oak leaves with acorns, ram heads, and garlands of grain. At each framing member of the dome are colorful turkeys.

In the souvenir program book for the Arcade's grand opening it is written: "The construction of the splendid group of buildings, known as the Arcade, was commenced on March 1st, 1902 and completed on March 1st, 1904. The Third Street Building has a frontage on the Third street of 66 feet and was built by Mr. M. J. Gibbons and The Dayton Arcade Company. The Office building has a frontage on Ludlow Street of 66 feet, and the Apartment Building has a frontage on Fourth Street of 200 feet. The buildings are of steel and concrete, have fireproof construction throughout, and possess every modern equipment and convenience. The elevator service is furnished by six Otis electric elevators, and the Power Building is equipped with a complete steam heating, electric light, and refrigerating plant of the most modern type. Through each building runs spacious arcades, richly constructed of marble and mosaic tile, converging into the Arcade Market House, which, with its magnificent glass dome and beautifully decorated galleries surrounding and overlooking the Market House, is unlike any building in this country; artistic in conception and perfect in execution."

Following the Progressive Era's focuses on public health, the Dayton Arcade was constructed to be a clean and safe hub for food distribution. Originally, the main spaces were used for a major food market, with retail stores, offices, and apartments on the upper floors. Through the first four decades of the twentieth century, this super supermarket and retail center was one of Downtown Dayton's prime attractions and destinations, offering the unusual in fruit and vegetables, seafood, baked goods, food specialties, meats and meat specialties, fresh-cut flowers, and assorted luxury items available in or out of season. It was coined in 1924 to be "The City Within a City" and said that one-sixth of the population of the city passed through the Arcade daily. If correct, that meant 29,000 people passed through every day.

The 1930s brought the Great Depression, and though the Arcade remained a fixture of the downtown commercial district, it still suffered as the city was hit hard economically. By 1940, there were only 25 merchants left, down 35 from the year prior. Dayton's industrial sector improved significantly during WWII and afterward, which directly correlated with the Arcade regaining strength. There was plenty of discretionary income which was now being spent at the "City Within a City". In 1952, the Arcade was sold to Robert Shapiro for $2.5 million.

The Arcade did see a decline with the construction I-75 and other interstate highways. I-75 and US 35 essentially severed West Dayton, a major hub of customers for the Arcade, from the rest of the city. This, along with the white population of Dayton moving to the suburbs in droves, saw the Arcade lose its major customer bases and soon fell into decline by the 1970s.

In 1974, the Arcade was placed on the National Register of Historical Places.

=== 1980s renovation ===
In the late 1970s, investors began planning and implementing a major restoration of the Arcade. In May 1980, the newly refurbished Arcade was reopened as a retail shopping and food center. In its new guise as Arcade Square, the center offered a lively collection of boutique stores, restaurants, stores offering staples, kitchen apparel, books, and luggage, and a museum devoted to Coca-Cola. The Dayton Philharmonic, among other offerings, performed to holiday crowds from the vast floor below the Arcade rotunda. Given the general decline of retail activity and volume within the central business district, financial success gradually eluded Arcade Square, and it was closed to the public in 1991. Its final tenants still included its famous Arcade Seafood store and the last traditional dime store to operate in Downtown Dayton, McCrory's, both of which remained open for a time after the closure of the Arcade Square public spaces themselves.

An Ohio not-for-profit group, "Friends of the Dayton Arcade" was created to advocate for the Arcade Building. The group published a book in 2008 entitled, "The Dayton Arcade; Crown Jewel of the Gem City. " The former owner owes several hundred thousand in back taxes. This tax obligation was purchased by American Tax Funding. The sheriff's sale occurred on March 12, 2009, and the building was purchased by Dayton Arcade, LLC, for the minimum bid of $615,106.02. The new Arcade owners, Gunther Berg and Wendell Strutz said they would begin work on the Arcade in 6 months to restore the building to its former glory (with mixed-use developments - housing, offices, restaurants, and commercial space). Early estimates on the restoration totaled $30 million.

== Dayton Arcade Task Force ==
Mayor Nan Whaley announced the formation in August 2014 of a Task Force to determine whether redevelopment is possible. The Task Force was composed of 12 prominent people from the Dayton area. In June 2015, Sandvick Architects and Jera Construction, Inc. announced that the Arcade was still structurally sound and made some initial redevelopment suggestions.

=== "Dry and Stable" initiative ===
In a 3-part series of videos the Urban Design Coordinator for the City of Dayton, discussed the steps being taken in Fall of 2015 toward bringing the Arcade back into productive use. The Dayton City Commission passed legislation in September 2015 for a $700,000 "Dry and Stable" initiative to be done on the Dayton Arcade to complete gutter cleaning and maintenance, securing any broken or missing glass frames, and fixing the mortar on some of the buildings where rain damage has eroded the mortar away. The initiative was intended to give the Arcade another three to five years of structural stability. The funds used to secure the building through this "Dry and Stable" initiative were placed as a lien on the Arcade and will be repaid to the city by future developers.

== 2000s redevelopment ==
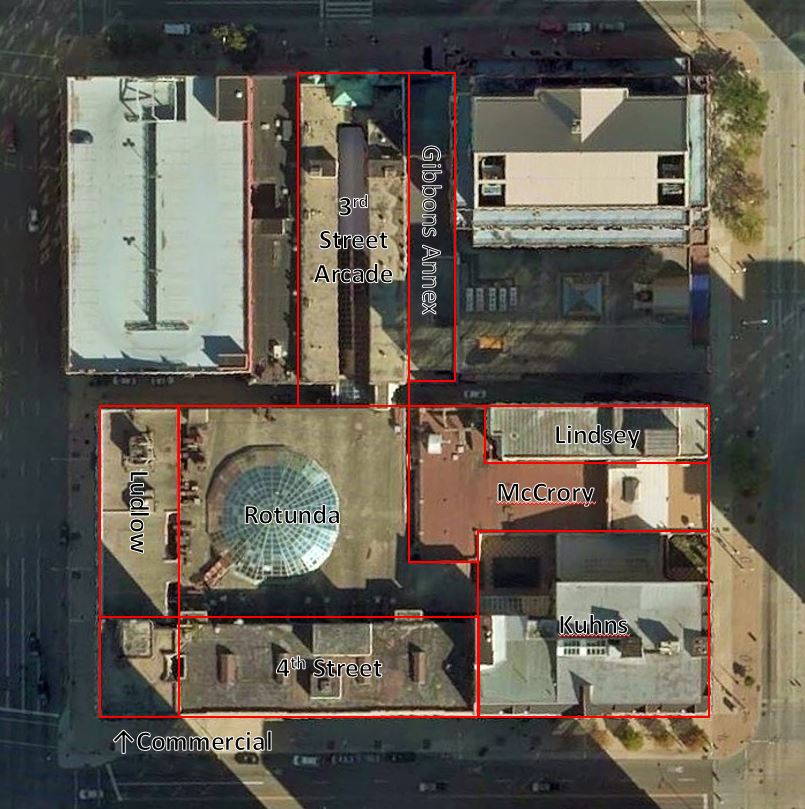
Layout of Dayton Arcade Buildings. Note that Kuhns is not interconnected.

Steve Petitjean, a senior vice president at Fifth Third Bank who is co-chairing the Arcade Task Force, stated that Miller-Valentine Group is providing $250,000 of the $700,000 needed for the "Dry and Stable" initiative, while the City of Dayton is putting up the remainder. Petitjean also mentioned that an out-of-state developer, now known as Cross Street Partners from Baltimore, Maryland is interested in the property. Initial estimates state that the mixed-use renovation of the Arcade may cost up to $60 million to complete. An article by Lewis Wallace at WYSO stated that "The [Miller-Valentine Group] hasn’t necessarily agreed to pursue that larger project, but these first steps are a glimmer of hope after a long time in limbo. "

According to Petitjean, Cross Street Partners and Miller-Valentine have collaborated on past projects and "bat 1,000" on redevelopment projects of local properties. It was also stated that the financing for the project will take some time - as much as three to five years before a project could be complete.

=== Phase 1 ===
On January 28, 2016, the City of Dayton announced that a Memorandum of Understanding with the development team of Miller-Valentine Group and Cross Street Partners has laid the groundwork for the first stage of the redevelopment of the Dayton Arcade.

Planned funding for the project includes the application for nine percent competitive housing tax credits through the Ohio Housing Finance Agency. These funds are awarded to low-income housing projects, of which the planned artistic housing is a part. Additionally, state and federal historic preservation tax credit awards will be a crucial part of the plan. The developers successfully obtained $5 million in historic tax credits and $20 million in low-income housing credits for the first phase. Construction on phase one is set to begin early in 2018 and take 14–18 months to complete once all financing has been arranged.

Miller-Valentine And Cross Street Partners have updated their Phase 1 plans to include the renovation of the rotunda as well. It is estimated that the costs of the first phase will be between $56 million and $80 million. These new plans include space for a brewery and a coffee shop. Other amenities may include another cafe and a grocery store. The developers also revealed their plan to create 126 apartment units in the first phase of this project which have been outlined below:

	4th Street & Ludlow Buildings	Commercial & Lindsey Buildings	Market Rate Housing		Affordable Housing	
# of Bedrooms	# of Units	# of Units	# of Units	Estimated Rent	# of Units	Estimated Rent
1 Bedroom	56	28	17	$675.00	67	$358.00 - $669.00
2 Bedroom	4	18	6	$775.00	16	$429.00
3 Bedroom	5	8	3	$875.00	10	$870.00
4 Bedroom	7	0	0	N/A	7	$981.00
Total	72	54	26		100	

=== Phase 2 ===
Stage two of redevelopment has a planned budget of over $40 million and hopes to create pop up restaurants along the third street arcade on the first floor, house an unnamed office tenant on the second floor, and create 32 "micro-apartments" on the third through fifth floors of the Arcade and Gibbons annex portions of the building. The developers have applied for $4 million in historic tax credits to help fund the second phase after successfully obtaining $5 million in historic tax credits and $20 million in low-income housing credits for the first phase. In addition, the University of Dayton will relocate its Entrepreneurial center to the McCrory building, occupying all three floors.

=== Waking the Giant ===
A mini-docuseries aired on local WPTD PBS/Think TV entitled The Dayton Arcade: Waking the Giant, released in the fall of 2020, chronicles the history and redevelopment timelines to the 2021 reopening.

== Reopening ==
After being mothballed, unused, and deteriorating, with many false starts and lackluster investment spanning well over thirty years the Dayton Arcade officially reopened to the public Aug. 6 and 7th, 2021 with a two-day Arcade Festival, held in conjunction with downtown Dayton’s Art in the City.

The event celebrates both the rebirth of the Dayton Arcade redevelopment as well as the revitalization of the Dayton arts community after a yearlong pandemic.

Dayton Arcade has residents for the first time since 1978. Tenants started moving into the arcade in early April 2021, and the Art Lofts initially received about 80 applications from potential tenants. Four of the arcade’s nine interconnected buildings offer apartments: the Fourth Street building (39 units); the Lindsey building (36); the Ludlow building (21) and the Commercial building (14). Seven apartments are market-rate units, the rest of the units are affordable housing that must meet income restrictions set by the U.S. Department of Housing and Urban Development (HUD). These are designed to appeal to artistic professionals, makers, and creative-class entrepreneurs, officials said.

The University of Dayton's major investment on the Dayton Arcade in a joint venture agreement with the Entrepreneurs’ Center have entered into a 10-year lease to become the anchor tenants for the Arcade with “The Arcade Innovation Hub Powered by PNC Bank,” a 95,000-square-foot space devoted to creativity and collaboration. A grand opening virtual tour hearing the vision of community leaders and developer Cross Street Partners took place on Thursday, March 4. The Hub’s completion marks the first phase of a multi-year restoration of the 1904 landmark.

Startup Grounds, The Hub Powered by PNC’s new bistro featuring food from local underrepresented, minority-owned, and women-owned vendors, opened Sept. 16 2021 at the Dayton Arcade.

The Dayton Arcade's initial anchors also include Culture Works who moved into its new location in the spring of 2021. The group occupies 2,000 square feet of space on the second floor of the Arcade, with office windows looking out onto Ludlow Street and near the rotunda inside. Culture Works has been named the manager of the event space of the South Arcade, which includes the rotunda area and the tank space. The group is launching a subsidiary under the Culture Works umbrella to manage these event spaces called CW Events and a percentage of revenue will be reinvested into the arts community.

"This money will be used as a catalyst for arts and culture growth," said Executive Director Lisa Hanson. "This move helps us evolve our mission into multiple revenue streams and will help grow the arts as a key economic driver in the region."

The Contemporary Dayton joined Cultureworks and the University of Dayton as Arcade tenants officially opening its doors to its new home Friday, April 30, 2021, with a free opening party for the public. The Contemporary Dayton, also known as The Co, and formerly known as the Dayton Visual Arts Center, has nearly doubled in size to 6,224 square feet at the Dayton Arcade, with five galleries incorporated into the new space.

In May 2025, a new Hilton Garden Inn hotel had a soft opening within the Dayton Arcade, ahead of a NATO conference being held within the city. The Arcade is set to fully reopen a couple months later, with additional shops.

== Gallery ==
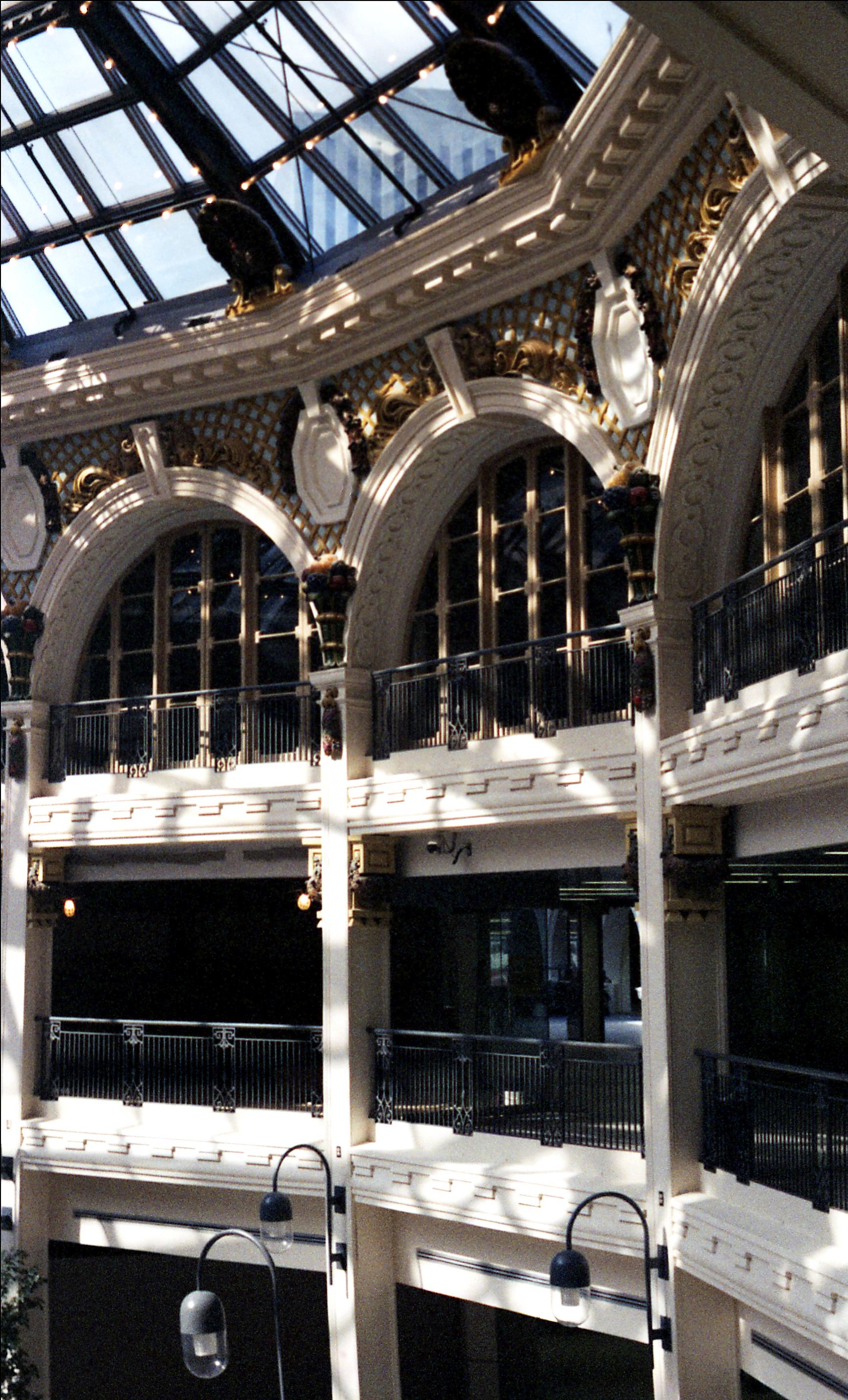
A portion of the Dayton Arcade, seen just prior to its re-opening as Arcade Square, in 1980 (Photo: James M. Steeber)

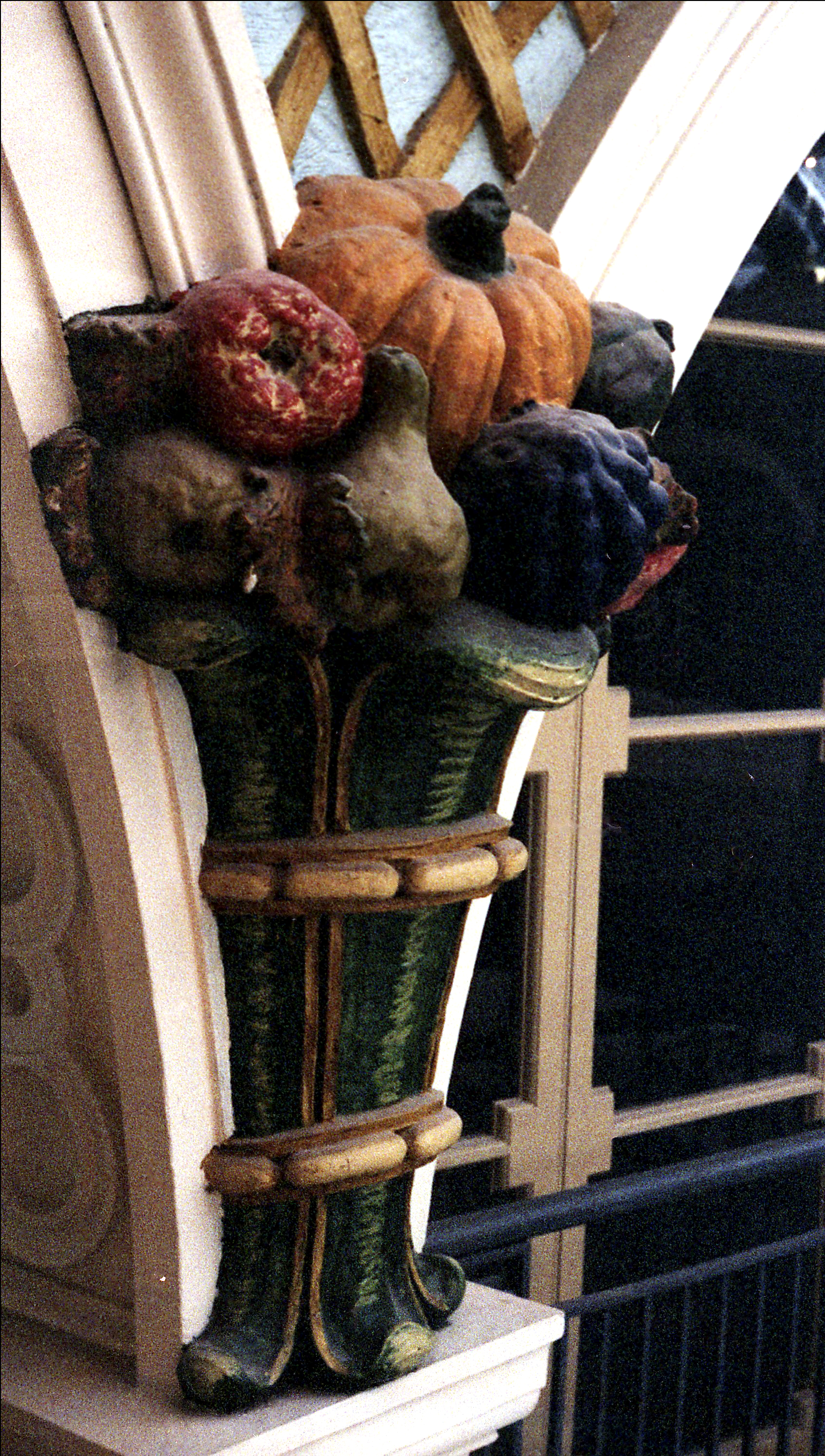
Detail of a Dayton Arcade cornucopia, from 1904 (Photo: James M. Steeber)

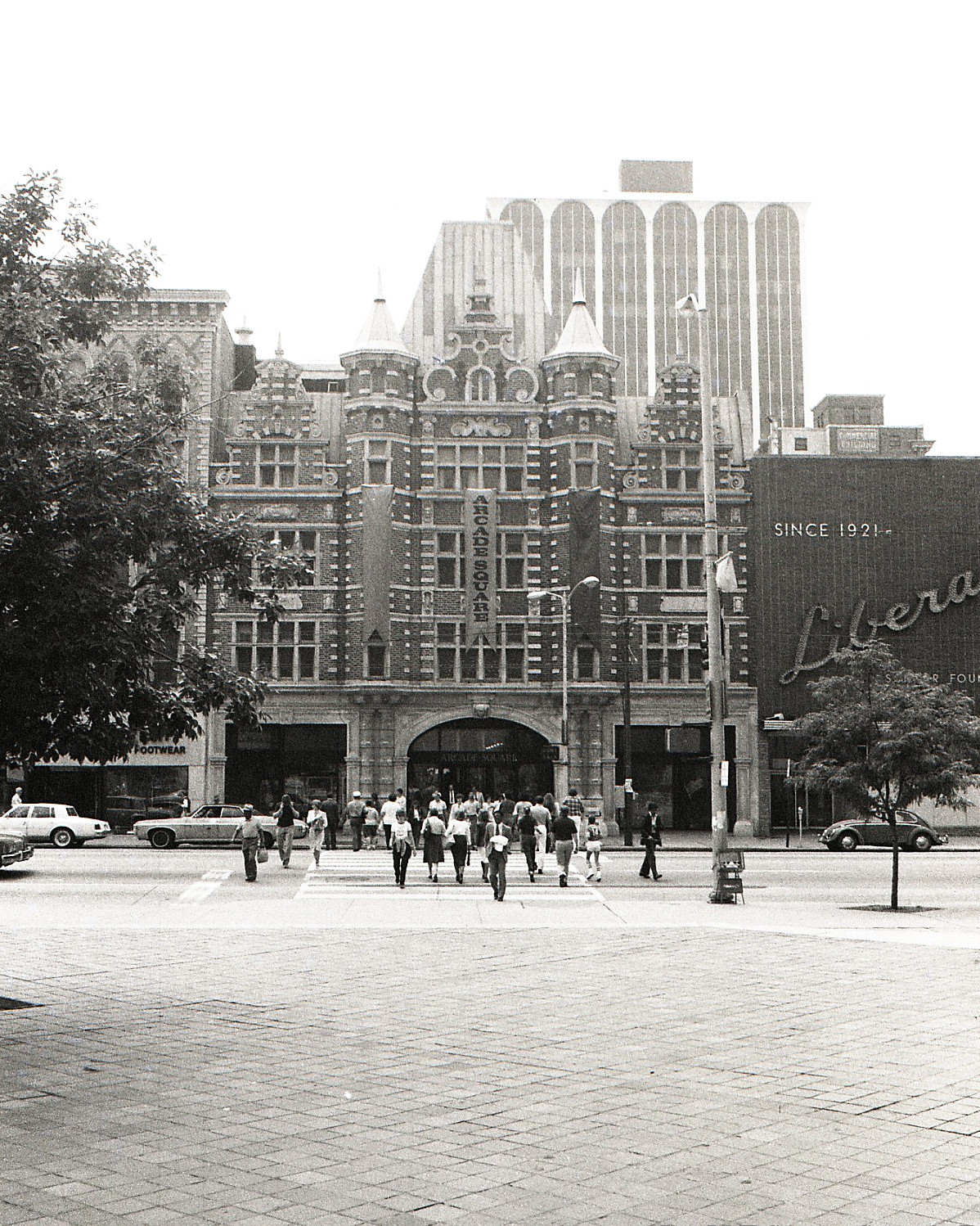
The former "Gibbons Arcade" entrance on West 3rd Street in Dayton, shortly after renovation (Photo: James M. Steeber)

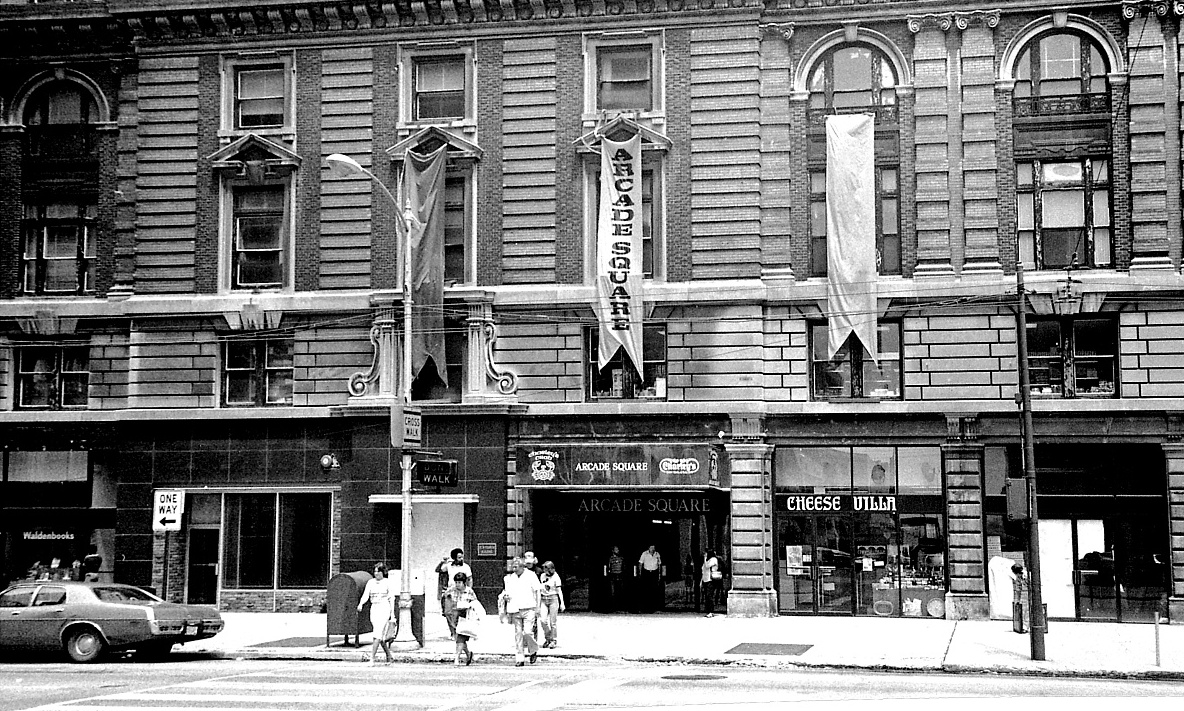
Dayton Arcade - West 4th Street Entrance, 1980 (Photo: James M. Steeber)

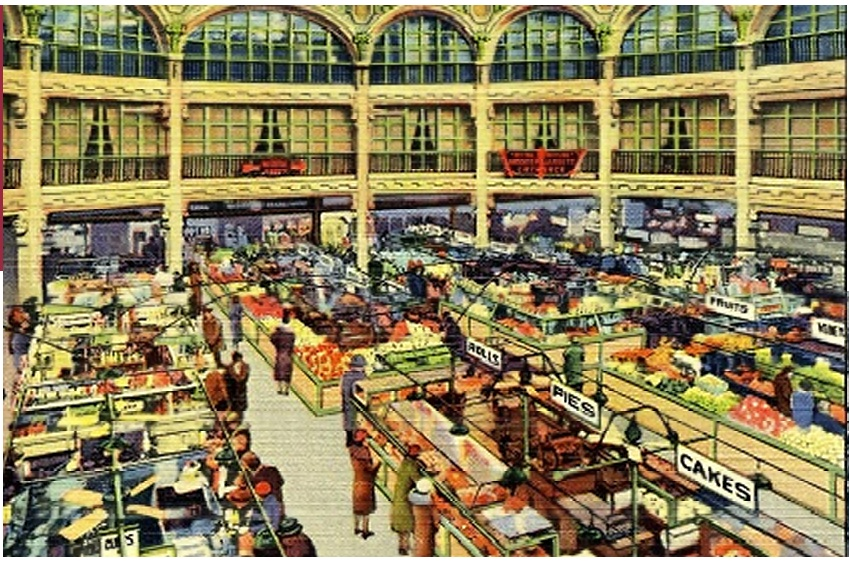
Dayton Arcade Market Post card view from the 1920s

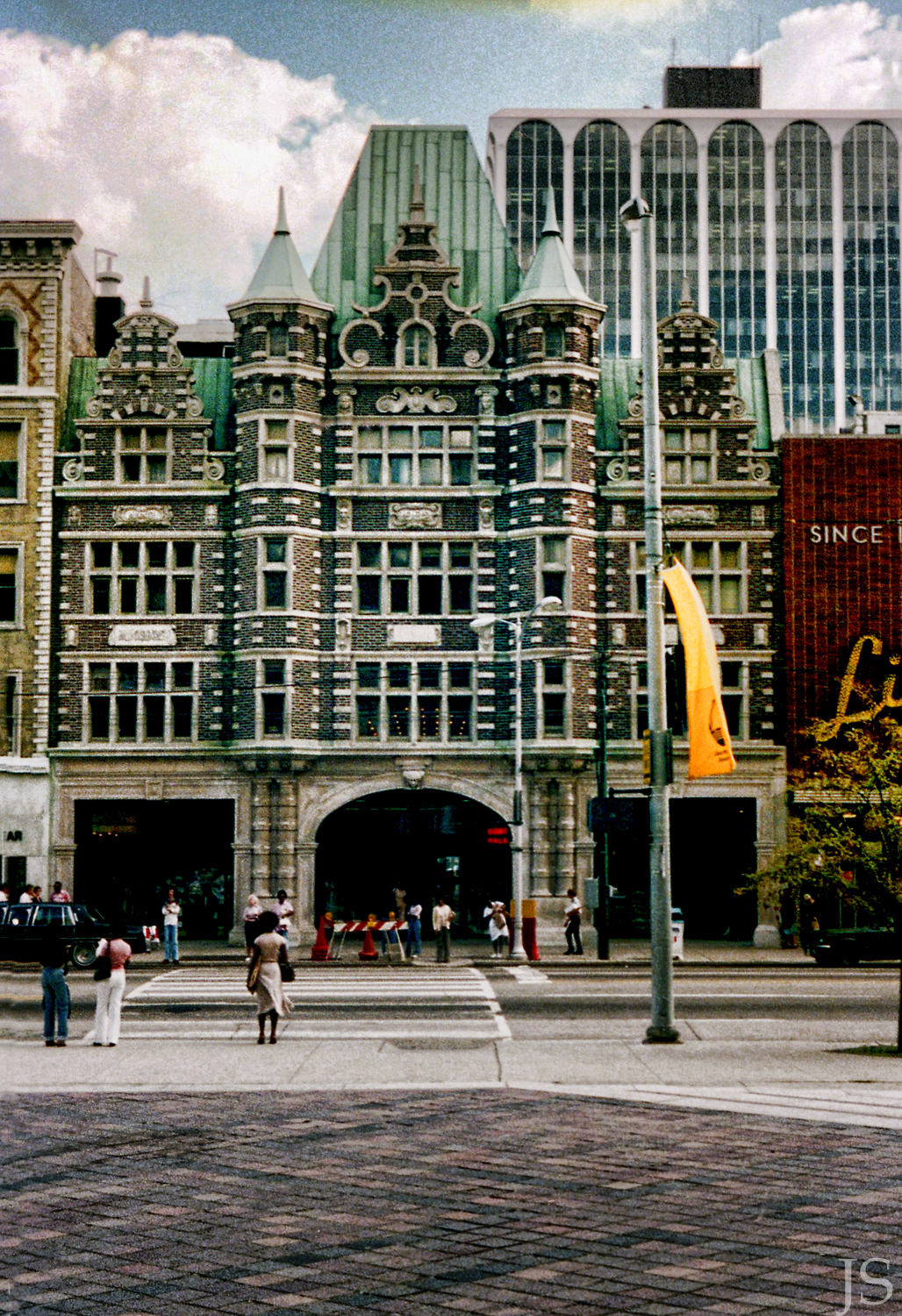
Third Street facade and entrance to "Arcade Square" as seen circa 1981 (Photo: James M. Steeber)

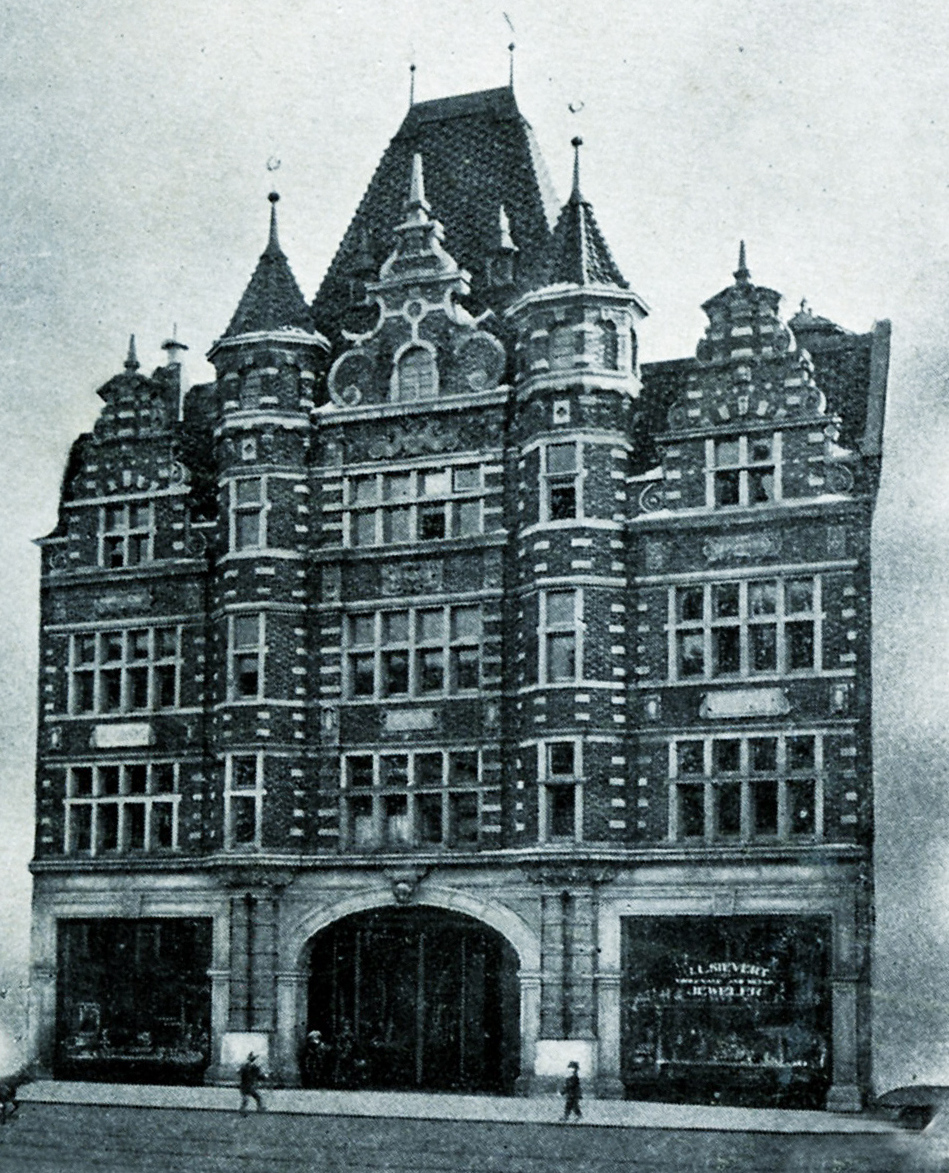
The Gibbons Arcade Building (or Third Street Entrance), as seen at its opening, in 1902

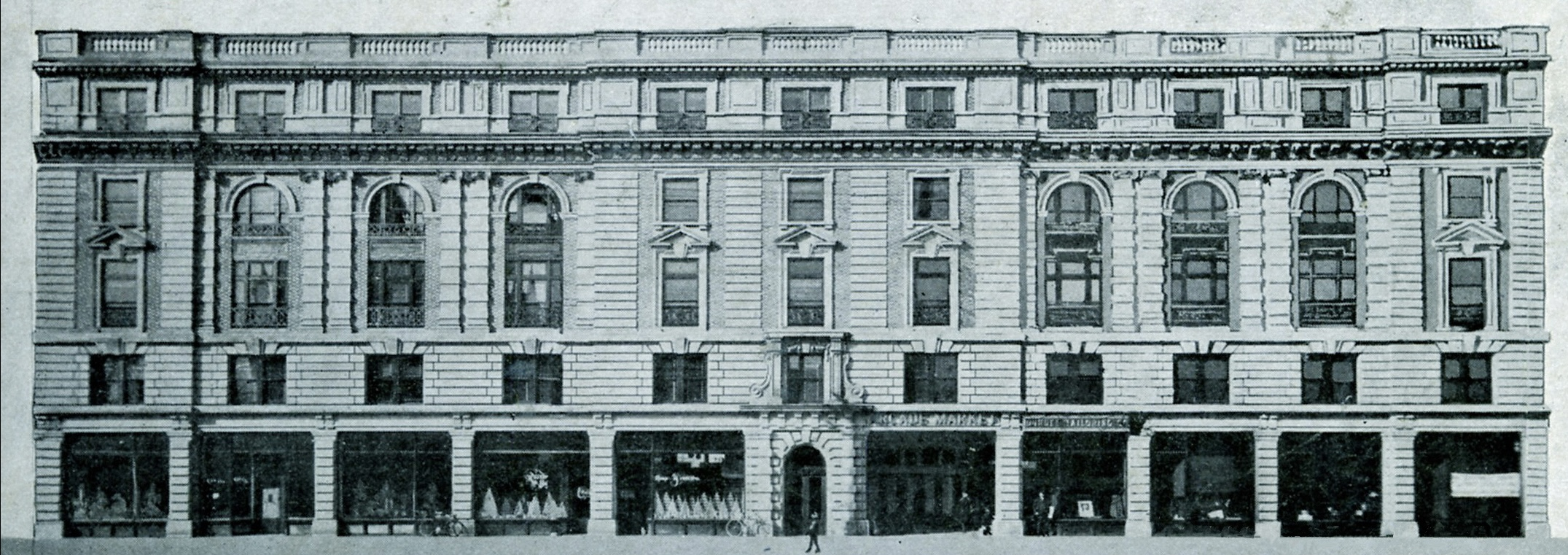
The Fourth Street Arcade Building, as seen at its opening, in 1904

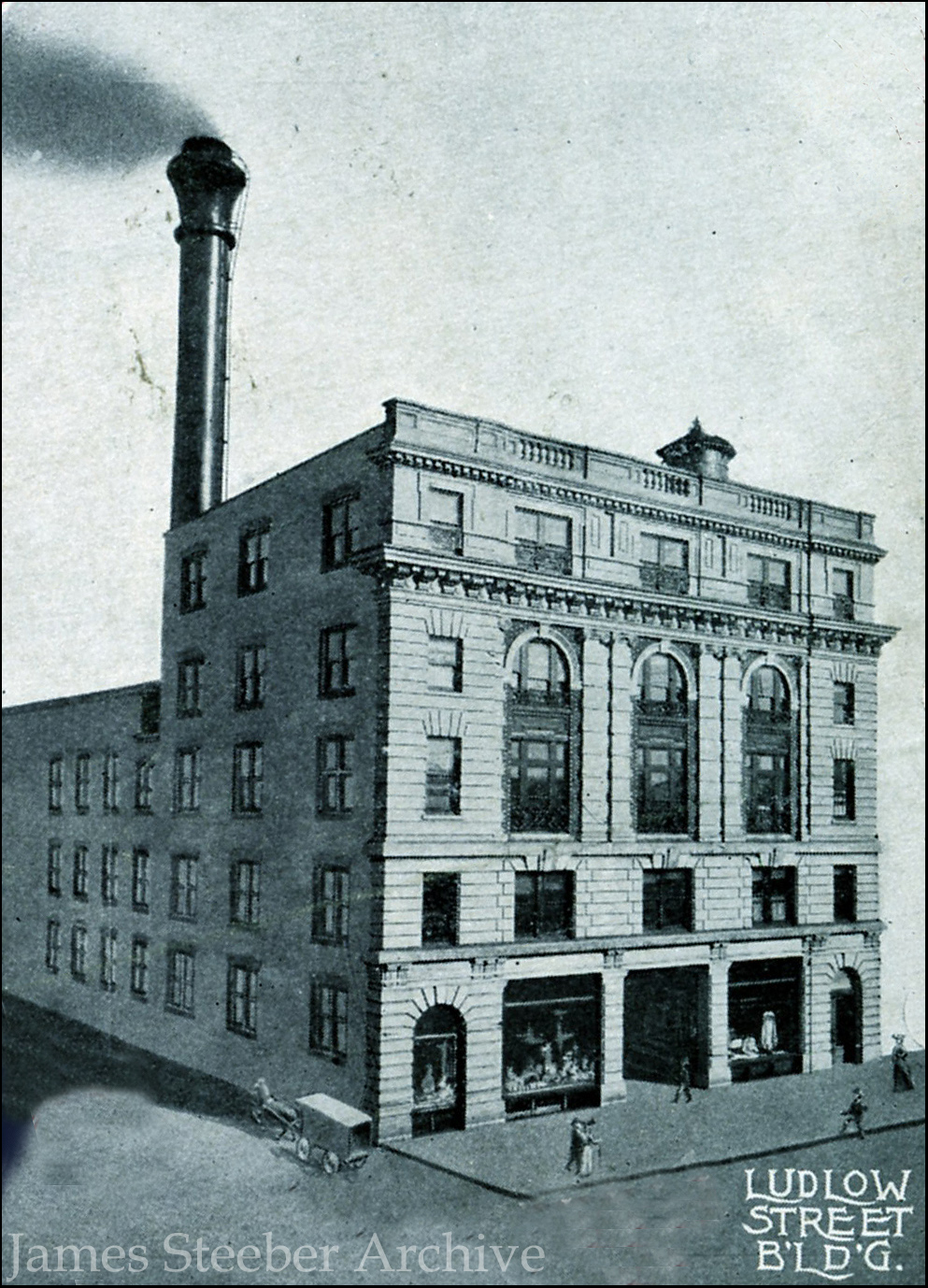
The Ludlow Street Arcade Building, as seen at its opening, in 1904

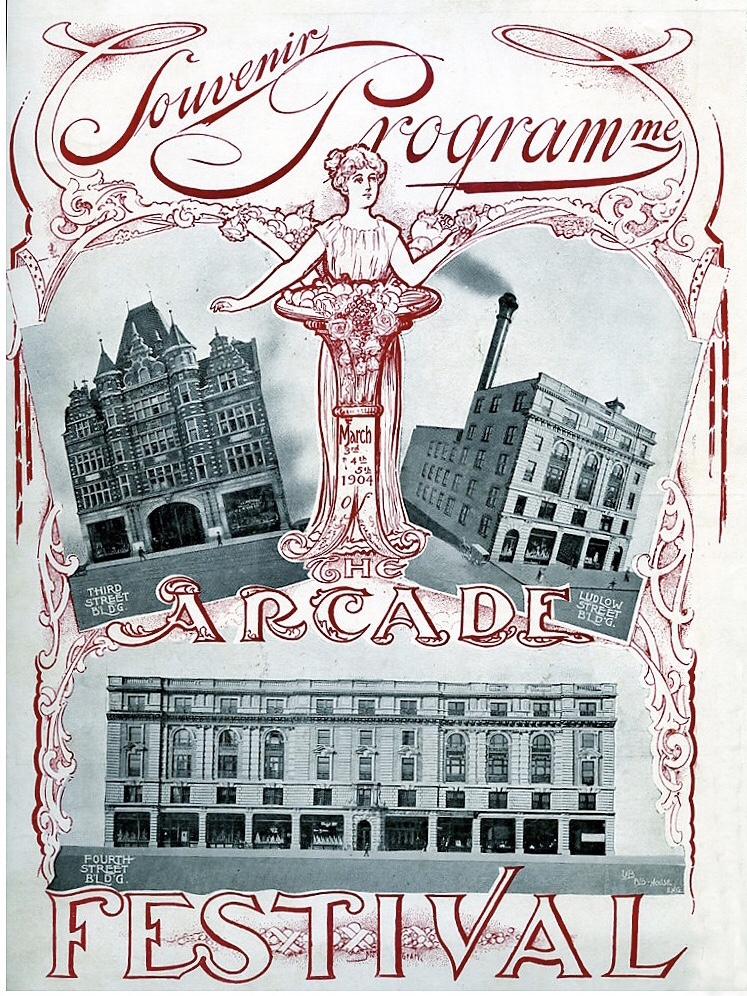
Souvenir Program ("Programme") for The (Dayton) Arcade Festival - March 1904

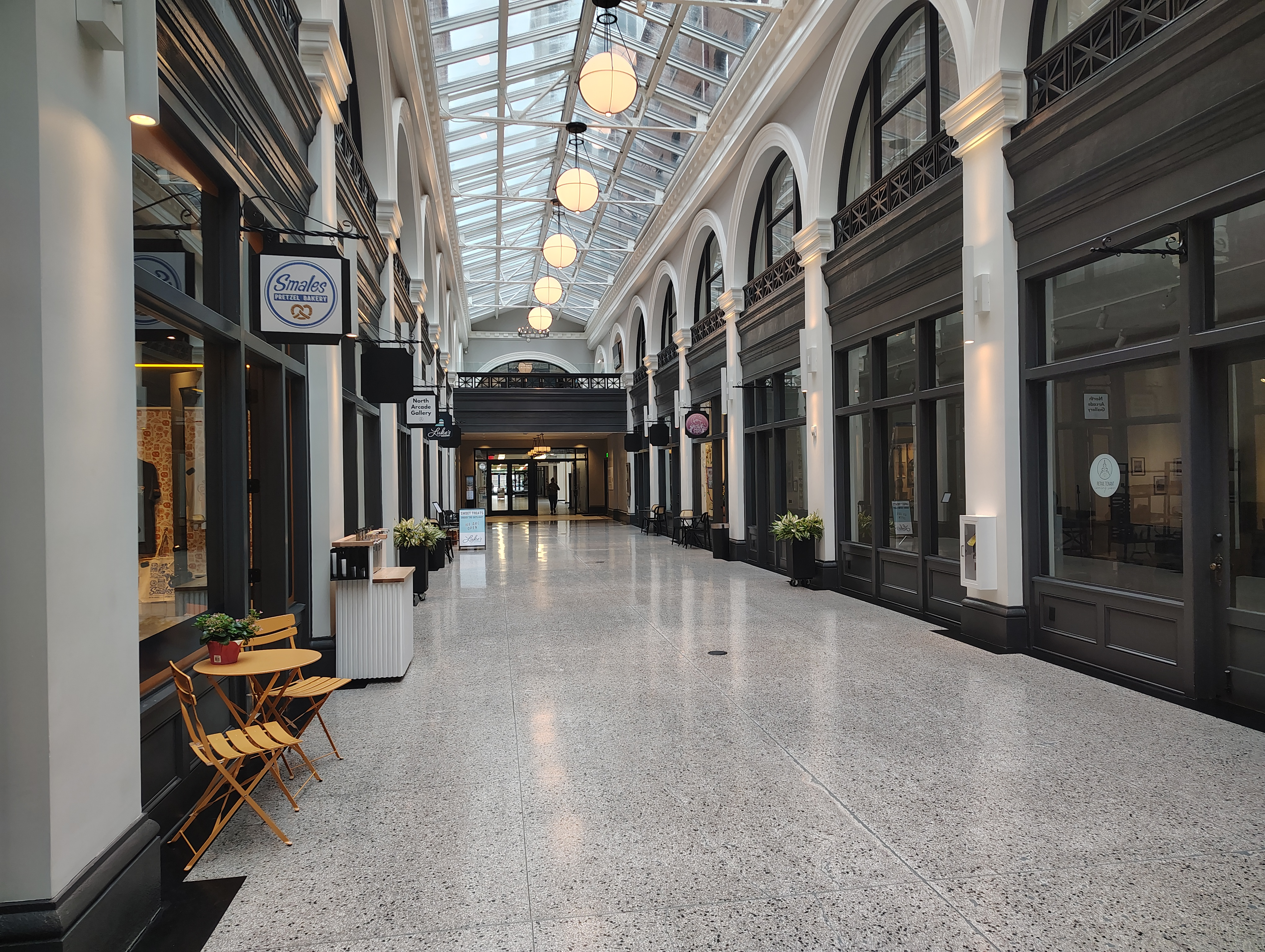
Interior of the restored Dayton Arcade on May 22, 2026

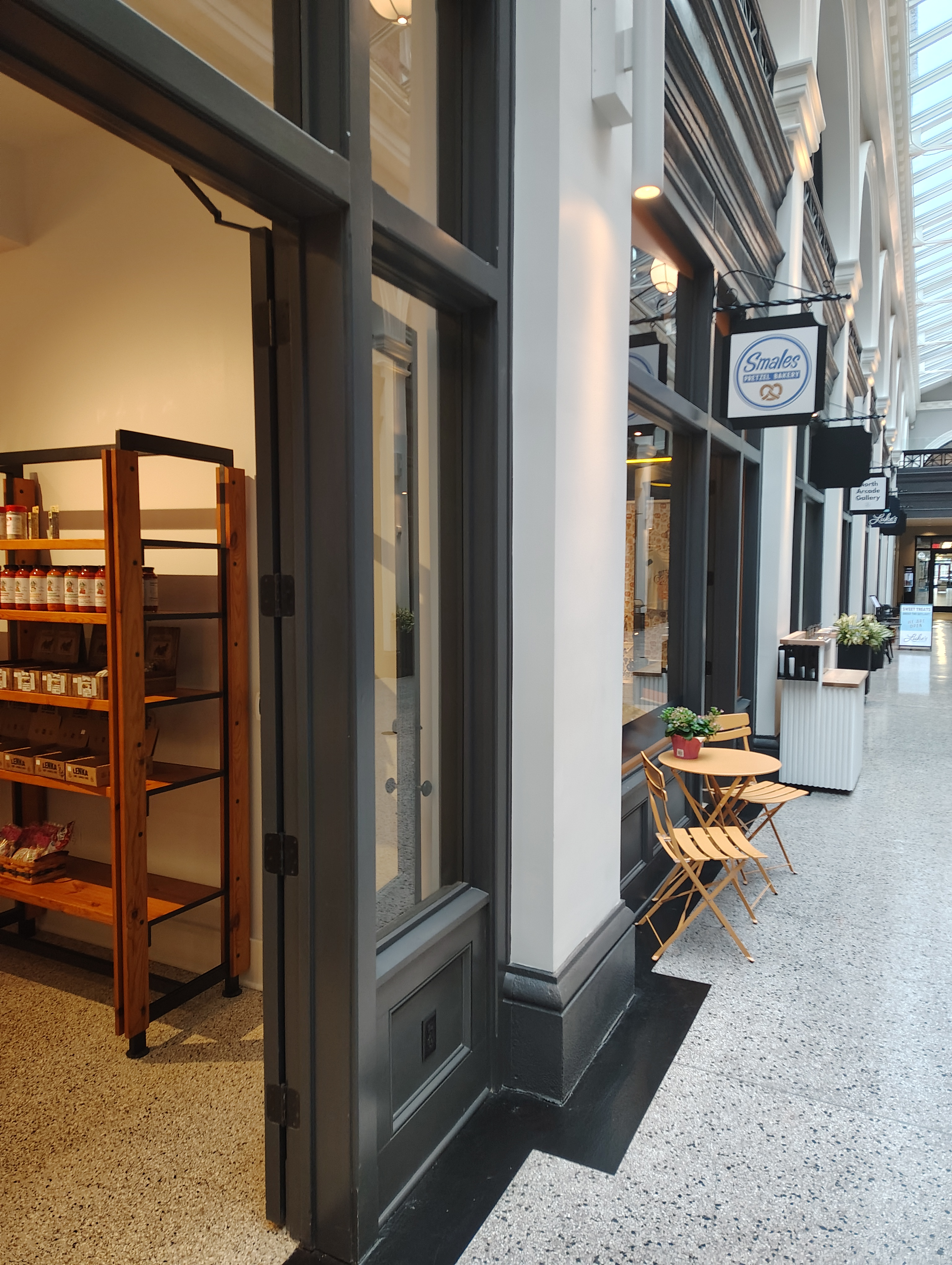
Interior of the restored Dayton Arcade on May 22, 2026

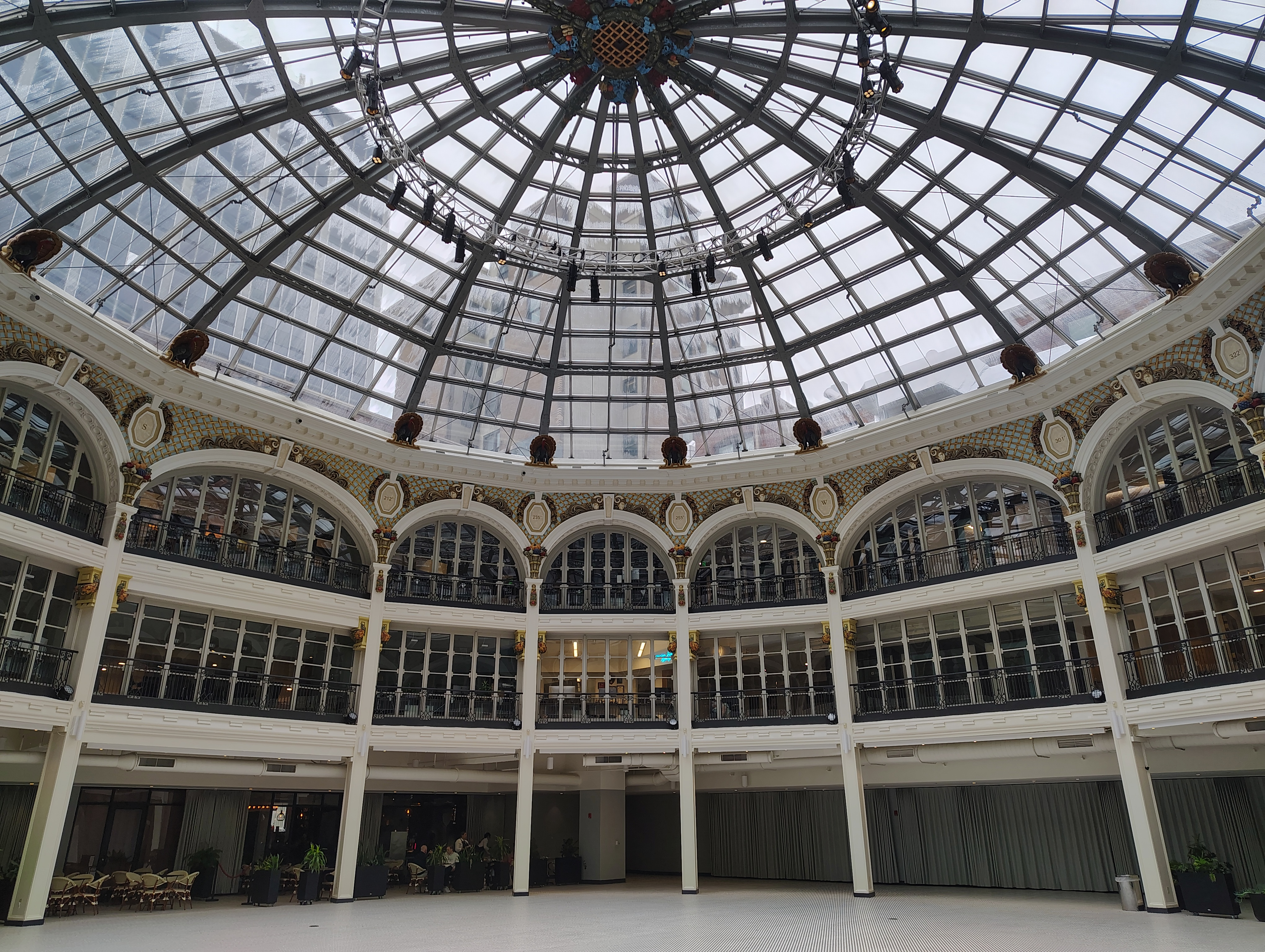
Ceiling of the restored Dayton Arcade on May 22, 2026

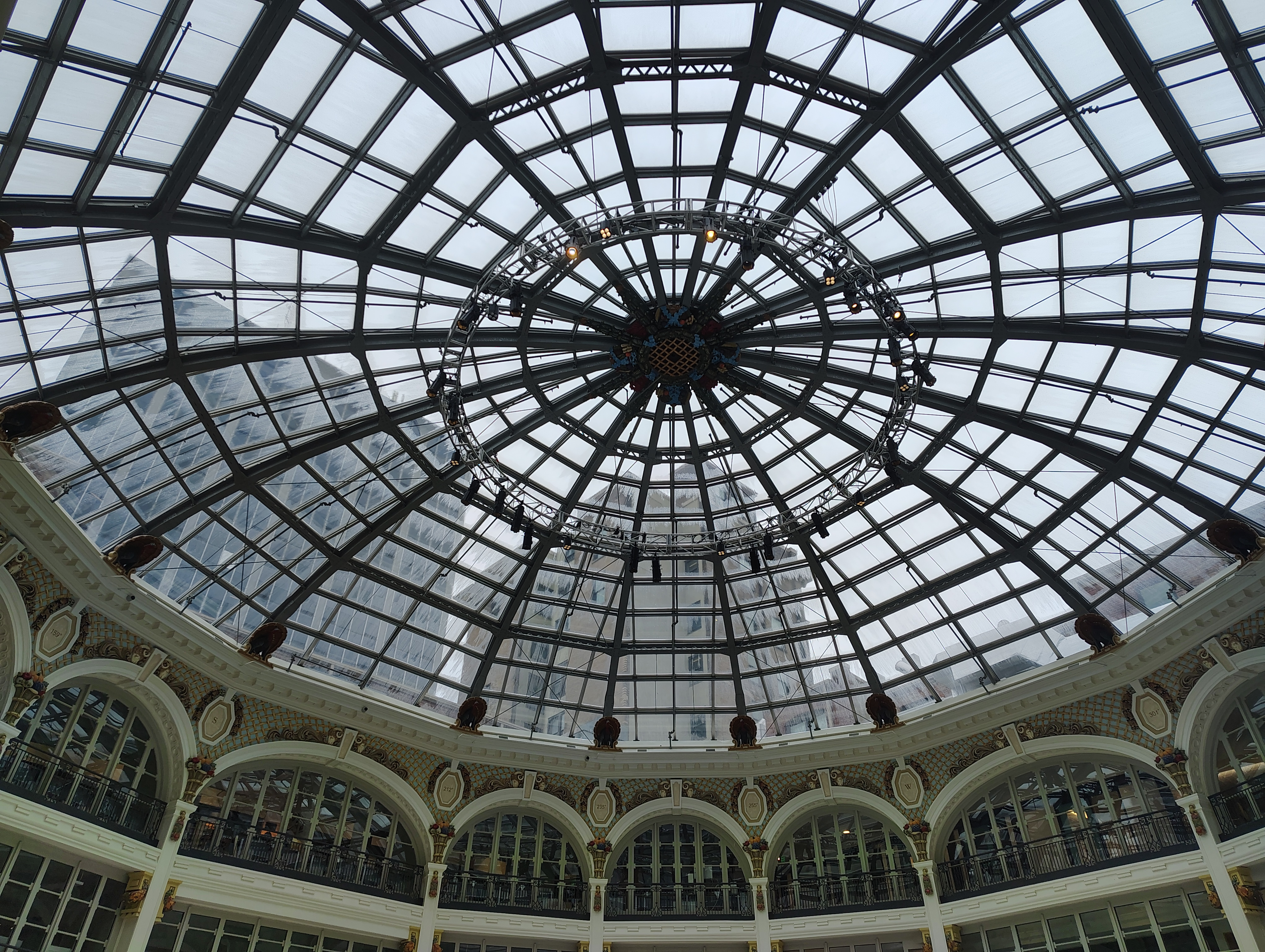
Ceiling of the restored Dayton Arcade on May 22, 2026

== See also ==
- National Register of Historic Places listings in Dayton, Ohio
