= Conover Building =

- U.S. National Register of Historic Places
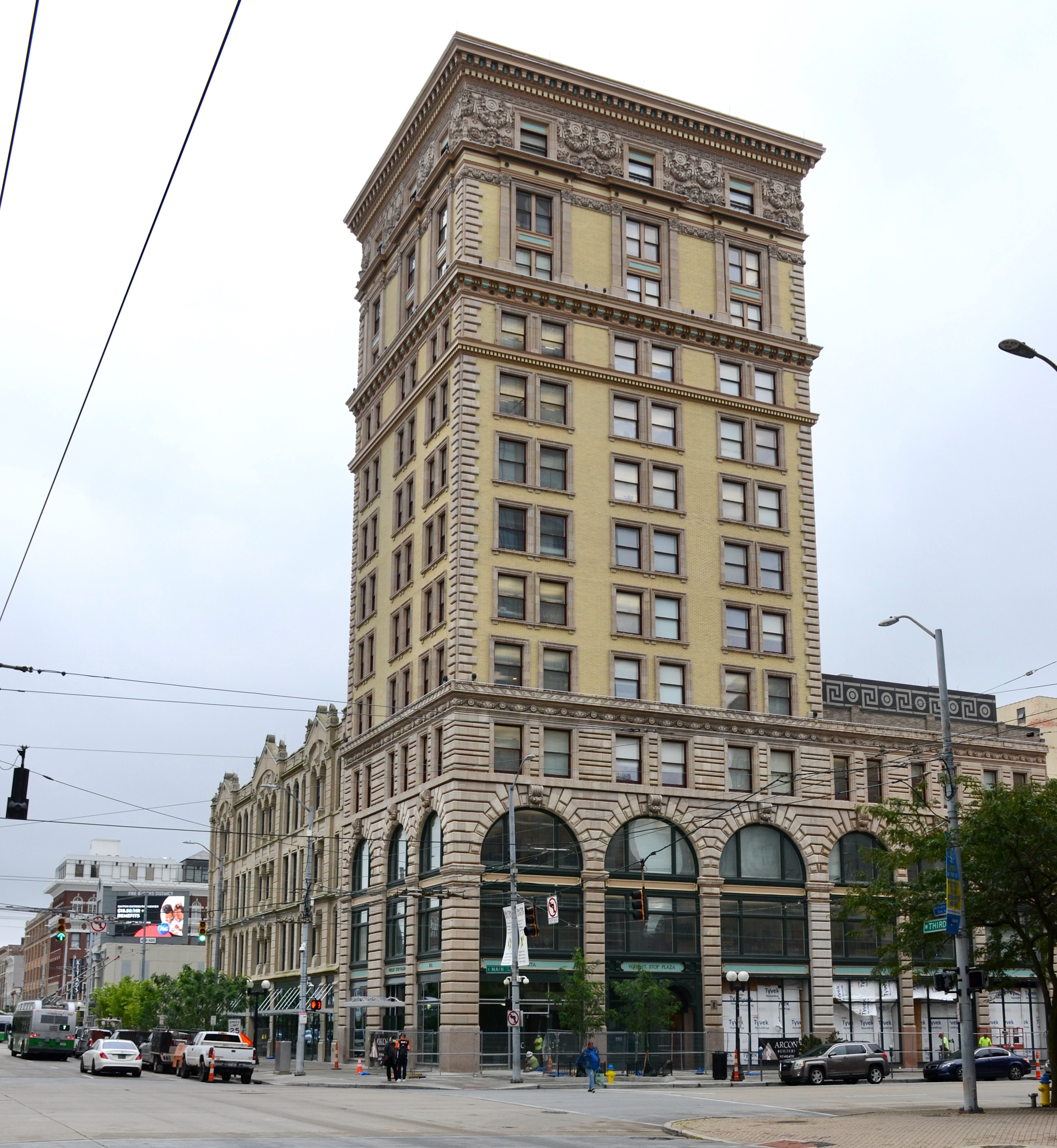
- From the west, showing the building's northern and western façades

- Location within Ohio Location within the United States
- Location: 4 S. Main St., Dayton, Ohio
- Coordinates: 39°45′33″N 84°11′29″W
- Area: Less than 1 acre (0.40 ha)
- Built: 1900
- Architect: Frank Mills Andrews; O.W. Ketcham Terra Cotta Works
- Architectural style: Renaissance, Eclectic Renaissance Revival
- NRHP reference No.: 75001497
- Added to NRHP: October 14, 1975

The Conover Building, also known as Wright Stop Plaza, is a historic structure in downtown Dayton, Ohio, United States. Constructed at the turn of the twentieth century, the Conover features a mix of architectural styles and sits at a prominent intersection, and it has been named a historic site.

== Architecture ==
The Conover Building features a mix of brick and stone on its exterior, although the design also employs terra cotta for peripheral purposes; much of the supporting structure relies on concrete and steel. Its overall design mixes elements from multiple sub-styles of Neo-Renaissance architecture, in addition to occasional Neoclassical details and themes. The architect was Frank Mills Andrews, whose work gained him fame throughout the United States.

Erected just eight years after Dayton's first skyscraper, the Conover Building stands thirteen stories tall. Its bottom four stories retain a typical commercial design, featuring an arcade, and Baroque styling appears on the top three stories, while the plainer six stories in the middle are distinguished by trabeating at their summit. Situated on the southeastern corner of Third and Main Streets, it lies near the United Brethren Publishing House, the Commercial Building, and the Dayton Arcade.

== History ==
The site of the Conover Building has been used for commercial purposes for more than two centuries, beginning with the opening of a blacksmith shop by New Jersey native Obadiah Conover in 1811. The present structure was erected on the site in 1900, and within a few years of its construction, it was recognized as one of Dayton's most prominent office towers; during the Miami River flood of 1913, when the Miami and Mad Rivers broke their dikes and flash-flooded the downtown, many pedestrians took refuge in the Conover Building's upper stories.

Nearly a century later, by which time the Conover had also attracted the name of "American Building", it became viewed as Dayton's most dangerous intersection: repeated incidents of crime at the adjacent central bus station led local media to deem the junction of Third and Main the "Corner of Chaos". Crime efforts have since fallen substantially, due to a reorganization of the city's bus hub and the restructuring of various other components in the area's built environment.

In 1975, the Conover Building was listed on the National Register of Historic Places because of its distinctive historic architecture. It qualified for inclusion partly because of its place in the entire city's skyline, in addition to its place as a prominent example of Frank Andrews' designs.

In 1998, the Greater Dayton Regional Transit Authority (known as the Miami Valley Regional Transit Authority at that time) renovated the building and moved its administrative offices into it. The renovation encompassed the entire 13-story building. The building subsequently became known as Wright Stop Plaza. RTA's Wright Stop Plaza Transit Center opened immediately to the south in 2009.

== See also ==
- National Register of Historic Places listings in Dayton, Ohio
