= Lagonda Club Building =

- U.S. National Register of Historic Places
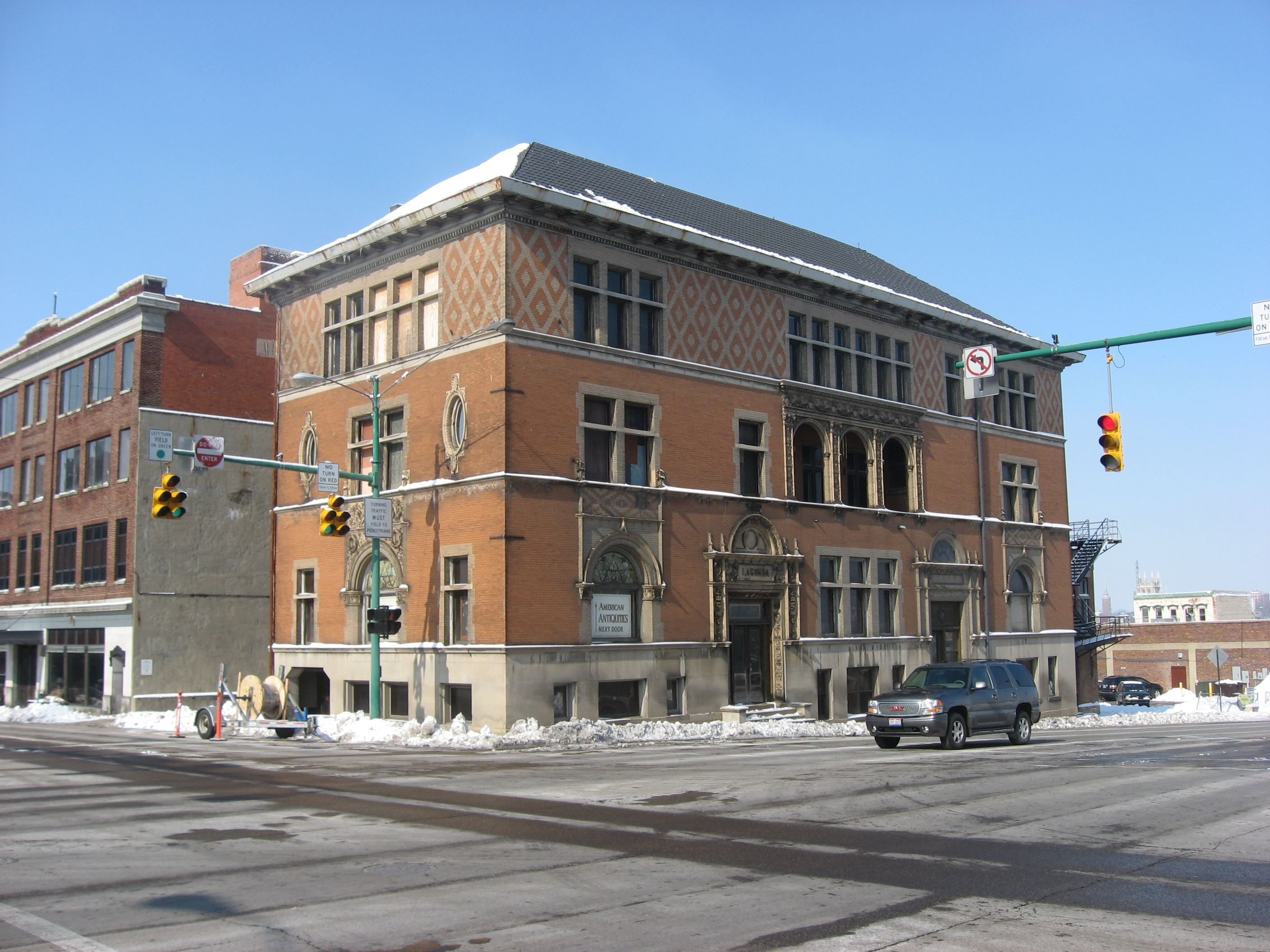
- Southern and eastern sides of the building

- Location within Ohio Location within the United States
- Location: Northwestern corner of High (US 40) and Spring Sts., Springfield, Ohio
- Coordinates: 39°55′23.8″N 83°48′25.456″W
- Area: less than 1 acre (0.40 ha)
- Built: 1895
- Architect: Frank M. Andrews
- Architectural style: Late 19th and 20th Century Revivals
- NRHP reference No.: 75001342
- Added to NRHP: May 28, 1975

The Lagonda Club Building is a historic clubhouse in downtown Springfield, Ohio, United States. Designed by Frank Mills Andrews, a leading period architect who was responsible for the construction of the Kentucky State Capitol, the clubhouse is a three-story structure with a large basement. Various materials are present on different parts of the exterior — while the foundation/ground floor is constructed of dressed limestone, the first through third stories are faced with brick; their only stone elements are stone trim around some of the windows.

Completed in 1895, the Lagonda Club is an early example of Beaux-Arts architecture. This style was favored by Andrews, whose work appears to have been influenced by Louis Sullivan's preferred style. After the Lagonda Club ceased to use the building, it became the headquarters of the local chamber of commerce. Today, the property is again owned by the club (now known as "Club Lagonda"), which seeks to rent most of its space to businesses. Because of its historically significant architecture and its place in Ohio's history, the Lagonda Club Building was listed on the National Register of Historic Places in 1975; at the same intersection is located another landmark, the former Warder Public Library.
