= Frank Mills Andrews =

American architect (1867–1948)

- Born: January 28, 1867; Des Moines, Iowa, U.S.
- Died: September 3, 1948 (aged 81); New York City, U.S.
- Education: Iowa State College; Cornell University (AB)
- Occupation: Architect
- Spouses: Gertrude Reynolds (m. 1894; div. 1909) Pauline Frederick (m. 1909) Ellen Brown (m. 1927)
- Children: 4

Frank Mills Andrews (January 28, 1867 – September 3, 1948) was an American architect born in Des Moines, Iowa, who practiced in Chicago, New York City, Cincinnati and Dayton. Andrews died in Brooklyn, New York.

== Biography ==
Andrews studied civil engineering at Iowa State College in Ames and architecture at Cornell University, where he was graduated with an A. B. degree in 1888.

The son of Lorenzo Frank Andrews and the former Sophia Maxwell Dolson, he was married in November 1894 to Gertrude Reynolds, with whom he had a daughter. They were divorced in March 1909. He then married actress Pauline Frederick in 1909; they had one daughter, Pauline (born 1910). In 1927, he was remarried to Ellen Brown, by whom he fathered a son and two daughters: Frank II, Doris, and Audrey.

He was a member of the Royal Society of Arts and appeared in Who's Who of America, and upon his death, the New York Times published an obituary for him.

== Works ==
Among his commissions were:

- Battle House Hotel, Mobile, Alabama
- Kentucky State Capitol
- Montana State Capitol wings
- Battle Creek Sanitarium, Battle Creek, Michigan
- National Cash Register plant, Dayton, Ohio
- Hotel McAlpin, New York City
- George Washington Hotel, New York City
- Columbia Club, Indianapolis
- Dayton Arcade, Dayton, Ohio
- Conover Building, Dayton, Ohio
- Lagonda Club Building, Springfield, Ohio
- Claypool Hotel, Indianapolis
