= Dayton Visual Arts Center =

Art gallery in Ohio, U.S.

The Contemporary Dayton
- Established: 1991
- Location: 25 West Fourth St. Dayton Arcade Dayton, Ohio
- Coordinates: 39.7618°N 84.1903°W
- Website: codayton.org

The Contemporary Dayton (The Co) formerly known as the Dayton Visual Arts Center (DVAC), is a non-profit art gallery and artist resource that provides art for the community and a community for artists since 1991.

It was founded by a coalition of Dayton-area artists, art supporters, and visual arts professionals who saw a need for more interaction between the public and regional artists. They believed that a vital visuals arts community is essential to the life of the community in Dayton, Ohio. The center offers art gallery talks, art exhibitions, professional development workshops, and other programs that support contemporary visual art.

== The gallery ==
The Co's (DVAC) gallery in downtown Dayton presents a full schedule of contemporary art exhibitions each year that are free to the public. There are usually 12 to 18 exhibitions. Some exhibitions include the annual Open Members' Show, the ARTtoBUY Holiday Gift Gallery, and a preview exhibition leading up to DVAC's annual art auction fundraiser.

== History ==
The Co. (DVAC) was founded as a tax-exempt organization in June 1991. Based on a 1986 proposal from Sean Wilkinson, its six founders were Lucia Bravo (Board President), Sara Exley, Lou Mason, Ruth and Nelson Mead, and Terry Young with a number of friends who provided the initial seed money.

Its Mission: DVAC was formed by a coalition of artists, visual arts professionals, and patrons to promote interaction between the public and area artists, designers, and their work through exhibitions and public programs. It is conceived as a 'people place' serving as a support space for artists and visual arts organizations, that will contribute substantially to the revitalization of downtown.

Their first location, 13,000 sq ft (1,200 m^{2}) of space at 210 North Main Street on the second floor of the historic Biltmore Towers The Dayton Biltmore Hotel was made possible when Muse Machine, a nationally celebrated arts education organization, and The Human Race Theatre Company moved into their current location in the Metropolitan Arts Center (The MAC). The Muse Machine sublet the Biltmore space to the upstart non-profit with a two-year lease. DVAC downsized in 1993 leasing 2,300 sq ft (210 m^{2}) of space on the ground floor of 40 West Fourth St(Then the Miami Valley Tower). DVAC in Motion Campaign raised 600K to renovate and move to space at 118 N. Jefferson St. in 2006.

In its first year, the organization was run by volunteer Acting Director Suzanne Mitolo and part-time staffer Edythe Nesmith as Office Manager.

The first full-time executive director Paula Recko led from 1992 to 1998 and was credited with growing DVAC membership to over 500 artists and community supporters. Office managers included Kathleen White and Niema Jones.

Wright State University Adjunct Art Director Kay Koeninger took over as executive director in 1998.

Jane Black came on as DVAC's executive director in 2003 and oversaw a staff of three, including Patrick Mauk, an Ohioan printmaker who has taught at four-year universities in the area such as University of Dayton and Wright State University, and Janelle Young, an Ohioan photographer, and printmaker.

Eva Buttacavoli was named executive director of The Contemporary Dayton in December 2011.

=== The Contemporary Dayton ===
In November 2018, The Dayton Visual Arts Center changed its name to The Contemporary Dayton and moved to a bigger location in the Dayton Arcade under executive director Eva Buttacavoli's leadership. A capital campaign was launched to support the move and bring more artists to Dayton, advance those whose work emanates from Dayton and Ohio, and exhibitions and programs exploring the social justice issues.

The Contemporary Dayton opened on Friday, April 30, 2021, with a free opening party for the public. The grand opening exhibition featured the work of Zachary Armstrong, Curtis Barnes Sr., and Cauleen Smith.

== Management and artists ==
Notable artist members of The Co. are Jud Yalkut, an internationally known pioneer in the field of video art and also internationally known teacher and artist Bing Davis who was one of the original 40 exhibitionists in 1991. In 2006, acclaimed sculptor, Jun Kaneko, presented his redesign for the opera Madame Butterfly in the gallery. A 2009 exhibit included work by Curtis Mann, a 2010 Whitney Biennial participant and in 2010 the "REACH Across Dayton" exhibit included work by Cuban-born artist Eduardo de Soignie and a public art installation by Juan-Si Gonzalez. A 2017 exhibit includes works by artist Glen Cebulash, professor and Art Department Chair at Wright State University. DVAC offered free studio space in exchange for conducting public programs, presented the Culture Lunch Series, artist technical assistance workshops, and the CityArt annual members show in which the work of more than 100 artists was on display in downtown windows, storefronts, and lobbies.

Area organizations that have collaborated as affiliate members with The Co. include the Miami Valley Cooperative Gallery, Visual Arts Network (VAN), Miami Valley Arts Council, Sinclair Community College, The Rosewood Arts Centre, National Conference of Artists, and the Dayton Art Institute's artist cooperatives. Funding came from area foundations, individuals, corporations, and the Ohio Arts Council.

== Primary sources ==
- Dayton Visual Arts Center collection Dayton Metro Library, Dayton, Ohio.
