= American Tax Funding =

- Type: Private company
- Industry: Municipal Tax Liens
- Predecessor: Transamerica Municipal Finance
- Founded: 2000
- Headquarters: Jupiter, Florida, United States
- Key people: CEO, Matthew A. Marini; Vice President, Tadgh Macaulay
- Products: purchaser and servicer of tax liens
- Subsidiaries: Reoco, LLC, ATFH Real Property, LLC
- Website: www.atfs.com

American Tax Funding (ATF) is a private company based in Jupiter, Florida that engages in the purchasing and servicing of delinquent municipal real estate tax lien sales. Originally formed in 1997 as Transamerica Municipal Finance (TMF), a division of Transamerica Corporation. In August 2000 the founders completed a form of a management buyout of TMF, creating ATF. ATF currently buys and services real estate tax liens in over 14 states and has provided over $1 billion in relief to local governments. Many ATF tax liens are secured by either Wells Fargo Foot Hill or the Harris Nesbitt Corporation. The process of privatizing the municipal tax foreclosures process and outsourcing to out of state third party, for-profit, private companies has drawn criticism from housing advocates who argue that a for-profit tax foreclosure process leads to more foreclosures, displacement and vacancy. The other argument is that third party purchases of tax liens enables local governments to pay for essential services such as salaries for teachers, health care, police officers and firefighters. To date, no study has shown that the sale of tax liens to third parties leads to any increase in foreclosure activity. In fact, the sale of liens to third party purchasers often extends redemption periods and allows flexible repayment agreements for delinquent tax payers.

== ATF News & Controversies ==
Between 2006 and 2008, the City of Syracuse sold American Tax Funding ("ATF") their pool of delinquent City and County tax liens upon roughly 1,900 properties for $12.9 million. Essentially, ATF paid the City of Syracuse $0.87 on the dollar, which was typically more than the City could collect upon these back taxes, and also assumed the liability of collecting and enforcing on these unpaid obligations, some of which were over a decade old. Initially, City Officials were "elated" to receive $4.5 million for their portion of the liens, but in January 2008 the City of Syracuse refused to sell ATF any subsequent liens and in December 2008, the City sent notice of default to ATF, citing in part that ATF had allowed already vacant properties to further deteriorate and had also refused to pay about $79,000 in back taxes upon half a dozen properties it had recently come to own through tax lien foreclosure and were actively marketing to local investors. In response to the City's notice of default, ATF filed notice of a $6.1 million lawsuit against the City of Syracuse claiming that the City breached their contract and asking City Officials to address a variety of complaints. One such complaint alleged that the City of Syracuse Code Enforcement Department targeted properties that ATF had recently foreclosed for violations and demolition, which caused outrage for Syracuse home buyers who were hoping to rehab these properties but were ultimately caught in the crossfire. The outcome of the legal proceedings between the City of Syracuse and ATF is still pending.

In Youngstown, Ohio, Pig Iron Press business owner alleged that ATF foreclosed upon his business without giving him recourse to challenge the action or offer repayment options. According to public record, in 2010 ATF did file a foreclosure action on both the owner's Youngstown business address and his personal residence in Boardman, Ohio, due to back taxes not paid from 2007 to 2009. Contrary to the published reports, ATF did indeed through its attorney offer a repayment plan to the owner, however, he did not believe that he was obligated to pay taxes and also filed bankruptcy, a claim which he later withdrew. ATF has a history of offering repayment plans in Ohio.

In Louisville, Kentucky homeowners and housing advocates argue that third party lien purchasers can charge excessive fees. According to public records ATF does not profit from any fees in fact all fees are charged in connection of the servicing or foreclosure of the liens as allowed by statute.

Between 2004 and 2009, the City of Schenectady received $43 million from American Tax Funding for their unpaid back taxes. However, in 2012, the City of Schenectady would not sell its liens to ATF and instead, initiated its own foreclosure action upon the 2010 and 2011 liens. In response, ATF sued the City of Schenectady as "the city's threatened foreclosure action would preclude ATF's foreclosures, would preclude ATF from collecting on the payment plans that it has in place with numerous property owners, and would also preclude ATF from purchasing subsequent tax liens pursuant to its right of first refusal under the contract." The City of Schenectady then sued American Tax Funding for the right to continue its foreclosure action. To complicate matters, in 2006 the City of Schenectady sold ATF multiple invalid tax liens filed inadvertently by the City on various non-for profits, such as a Hindu Temple and various churches. The City admits that the liens were inappropriately assessed and sold but "doesn't want to pay the nonprofits' roughly $280,000 bill." Litigation between the City and ATF is still pending, along with the settlement resolution of the non-for profit liens.

In a rather unusual case in Rochester, New York, ATF foreclosed upon a property with $39,000 in back taxes and years of code violations which were included in these property taxes. As authorized by State of New York, municipalities may treat code violation fines as part of unpaid base property taxes and subsequently sell these liens to third party investors, such as ATF. In this case, the owners defended themselves in court against the foreclosure and claimed they were "Moorish American Aboriginals, changed their last name...and argued that the house was within the Iroquois territory of the Moorish Empire," thus, they were tax exempt. The defense was eventually dismissed by a judge, but the practice of including code violations in property tax has elicited protests from homeowners who have delinquent tax liens and code violations, along with community groups in Rochester, NY. Alternatively, it may be argued that including unpaid code enforcement fines in property tax bills may be seen as an effort to preserve and enhance the value of City neighborhoods, and to protect the safety, health and welfare of its citizens. According to the City Treasurer, "Rochester is perfectly happy in its relationship with ATF."

== See also ==
- Tax lien sale
- Foreclosure
- Tax taking
- Tax deed sale
- Privatization
