= Monmouth Street Historic District =

Historic district in Kentucky, United States

- U.S. National Register of Historic Places
- U.S. Historic district
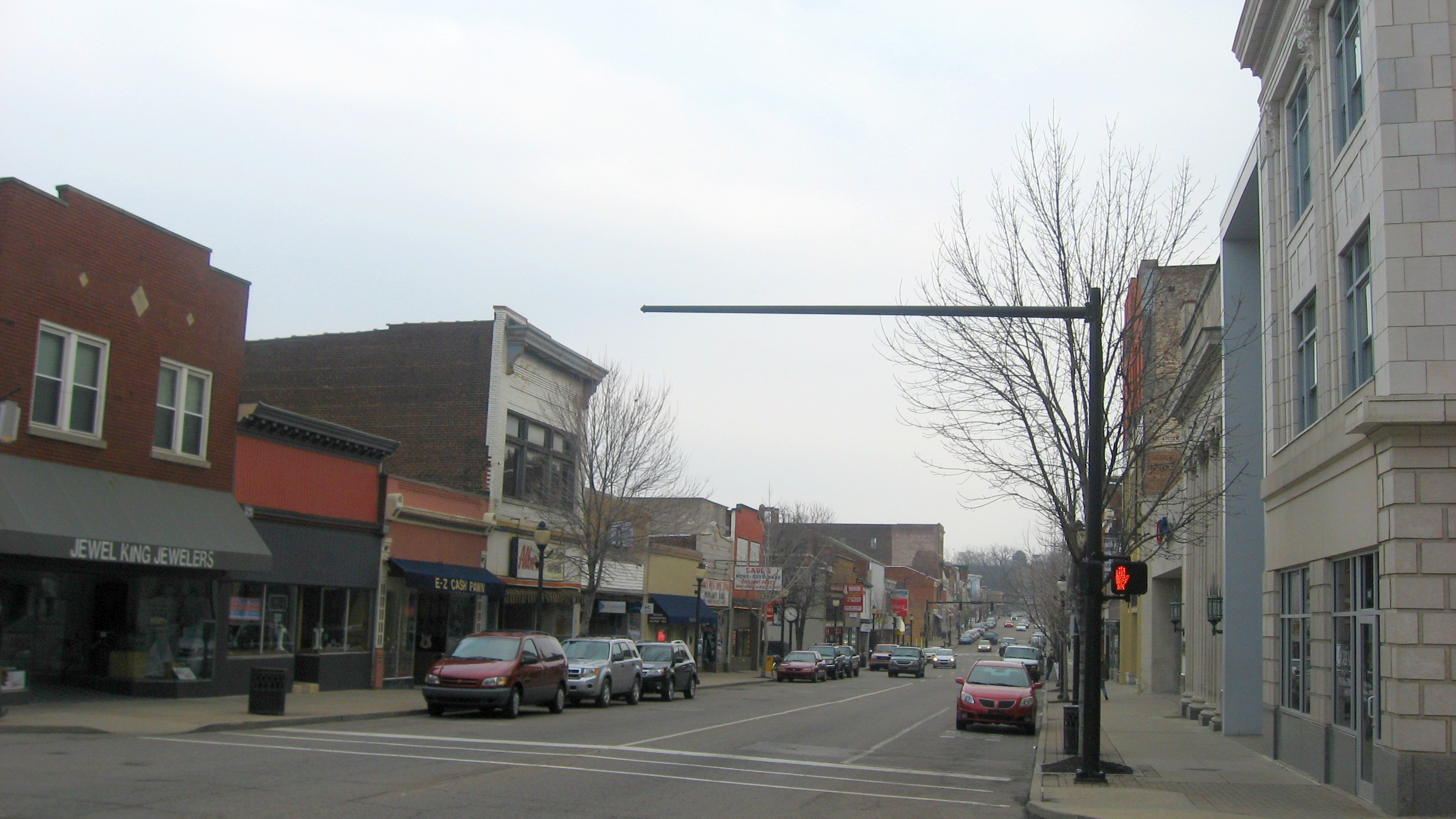

- Location within Kentucky Location within the United States
- Location: Monmouth St. between 3rd and 11th Sts., Newport, Kentucky
- Coordinates: 39°05′22″N 84°29′39″W
- Area: 8 acres (3.2 ha)
- Built: 1847
- Architect: McLaughlin, James W.; Werner and Atkins; others
- Architectural style: Italianate, Classical Revival, Moderne
- NRHP reference No.: 96000794
- Added to NRHP: July 25, 1996

The Monmouth Street Historic District is located in Newport, Kentucky. The district was placed on the National Register of Historic Places in 1996. The district includes Monmouth Street, the main commercial street of the city, between Third Street (near Newport on the Levee), then south to Eleventh Street. It contains 80 acres (320,000 m^{2}) and 94 buildings. Most of the buildings were built between 1850 and 1949.

The district included 94 contributing buildings among its 143 properties, including the 1902 Carnegie library, Campbell County's first public library and a work of the Cincinnati architects Werner and Atkins.
