= Newport on the Levee =

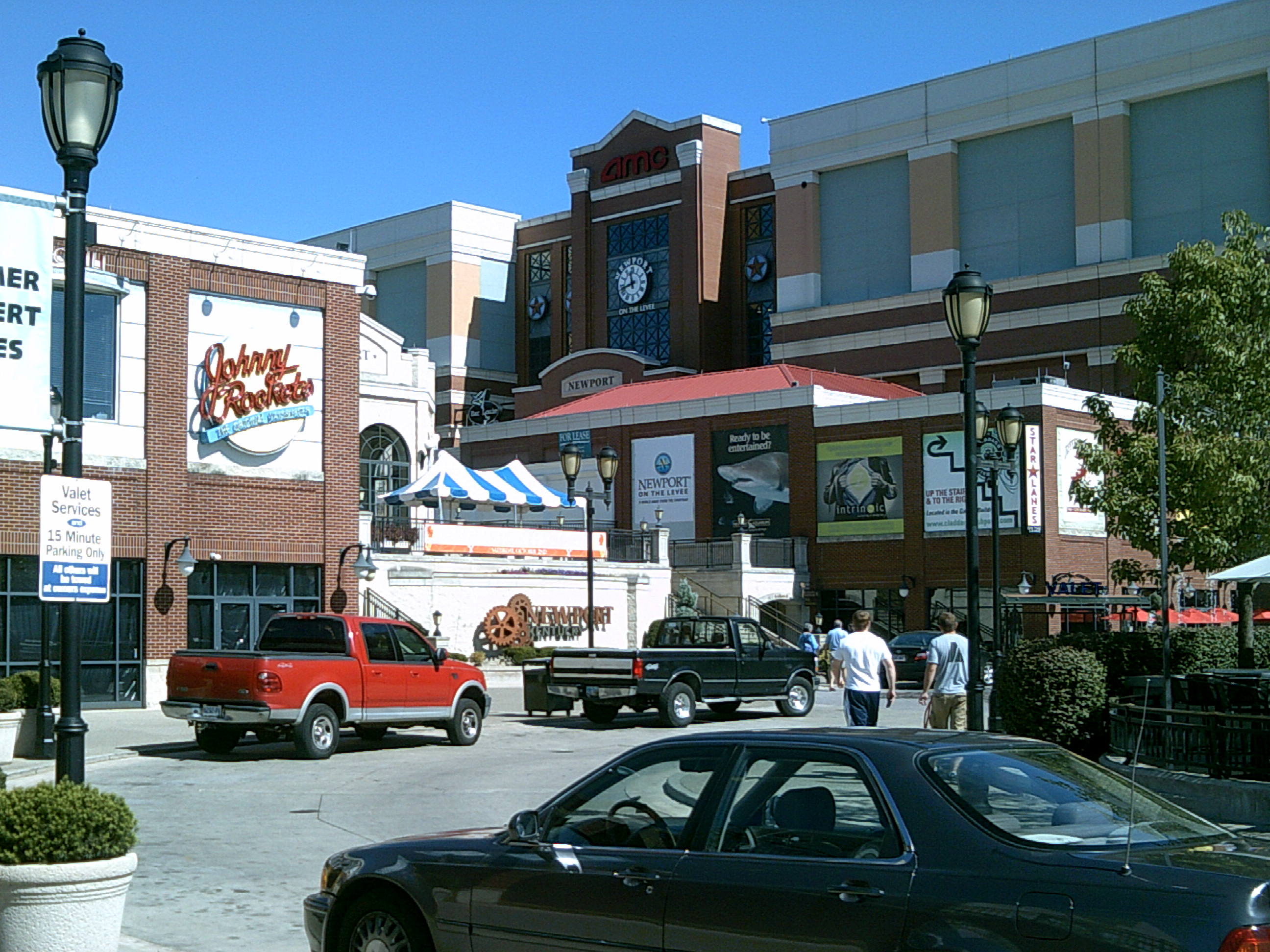
- Newport on the Levee as viewed from street level
- Location: Newport, Kentucky, United States
- Coordinates: 39.0947°N 84.4964°W
- Address: 1 Levee Way Newport
- Opened: 2001
- Developer: Steiner & Associates
- Owner: The Price Group
- Architect: GBBN Architects
- Floors: 4
- Parking: 2,000 spaces
- Public transit: TANK
- Website: www.newportonthelevee.com

Newport on the Levee is a dining and attraction destination located on Third Street in Newport, Kentucky. It is adjacent to the Purple People Bridge along the Ohio River with views of downtown Cincinnati and the Ohio River. The Levee is one block away from the East Row Historic District and the Monmouth Street Historic District. It is named after the levee that it rests on.

The area features community events, office, retail, and attractions; its anchor tenant is the Newport Aquarium.

== History ==
The site which Newport on the Levee occupies were formerly the Posey Flats apartments, which were listed on the National Register of Historic Places in 1987. The Posey Flats were a four-story, twin structure in the Queen Anne architectural style. They are still listed on the National Register of Historic places, despite no longer standing.

Newport on the Levee opened in 2001, constructed on a budget of $200 million. On opening, the Levee featured the Newport Aquarium as its anchor tenant, alongside an AMC movie theater, restaurants, a comedy club, and a Barnes & Noble. There was also an IMAX theater, which closed in 2003.

The development added a residential component with Aqua on the Levee, an $80 million expansion which opened to the eastern side of Newport on the Levee in 2016.

In 2017, the AMC theater began a revitalization project with a lease extension through 2032. The Barnes & Noble location at the Levee closed in 2019.

On March 16, 2024, a shooting incident took place at Newport on the Levee, injuring three people.

== Gallery ==
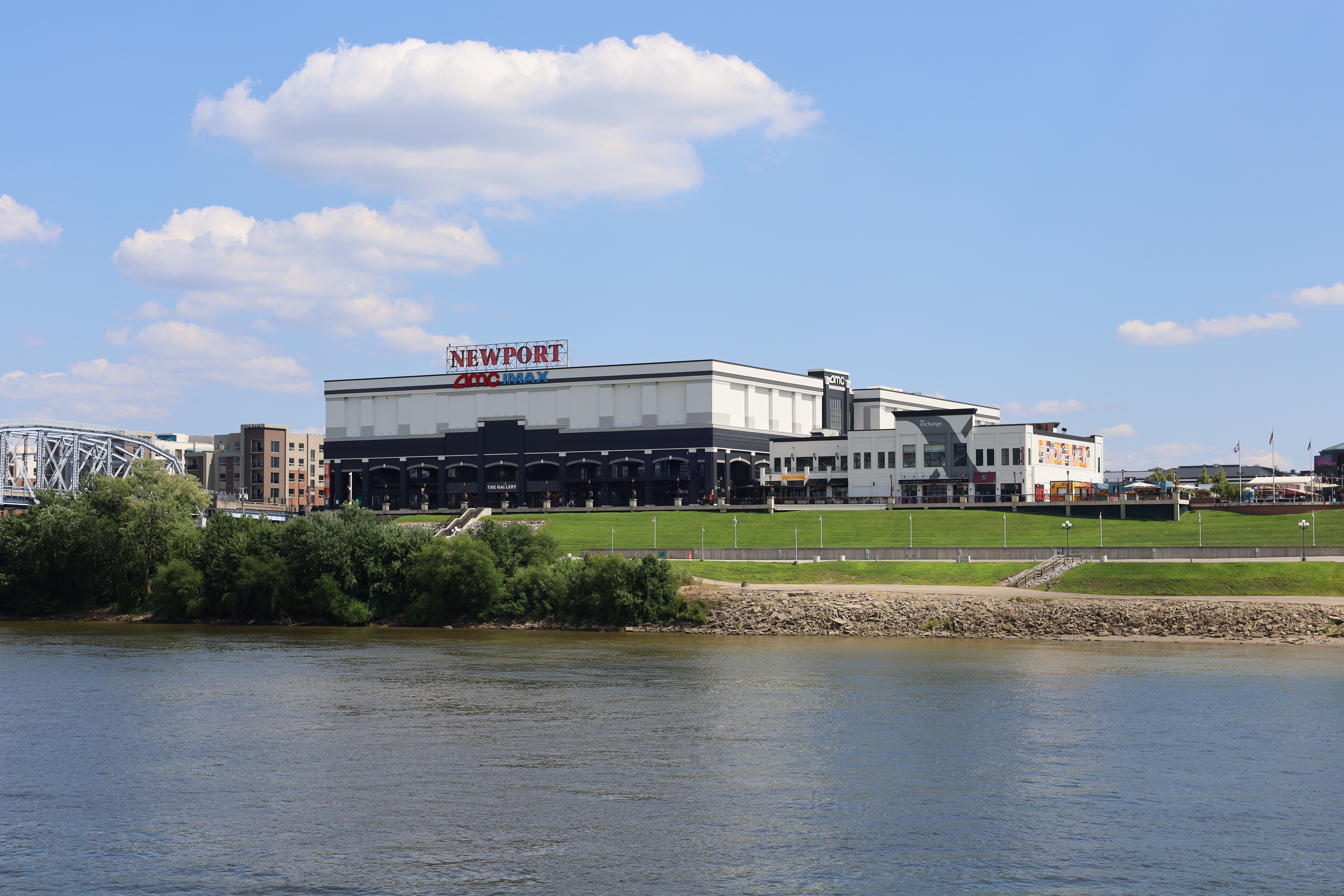
The mall viewed from the river

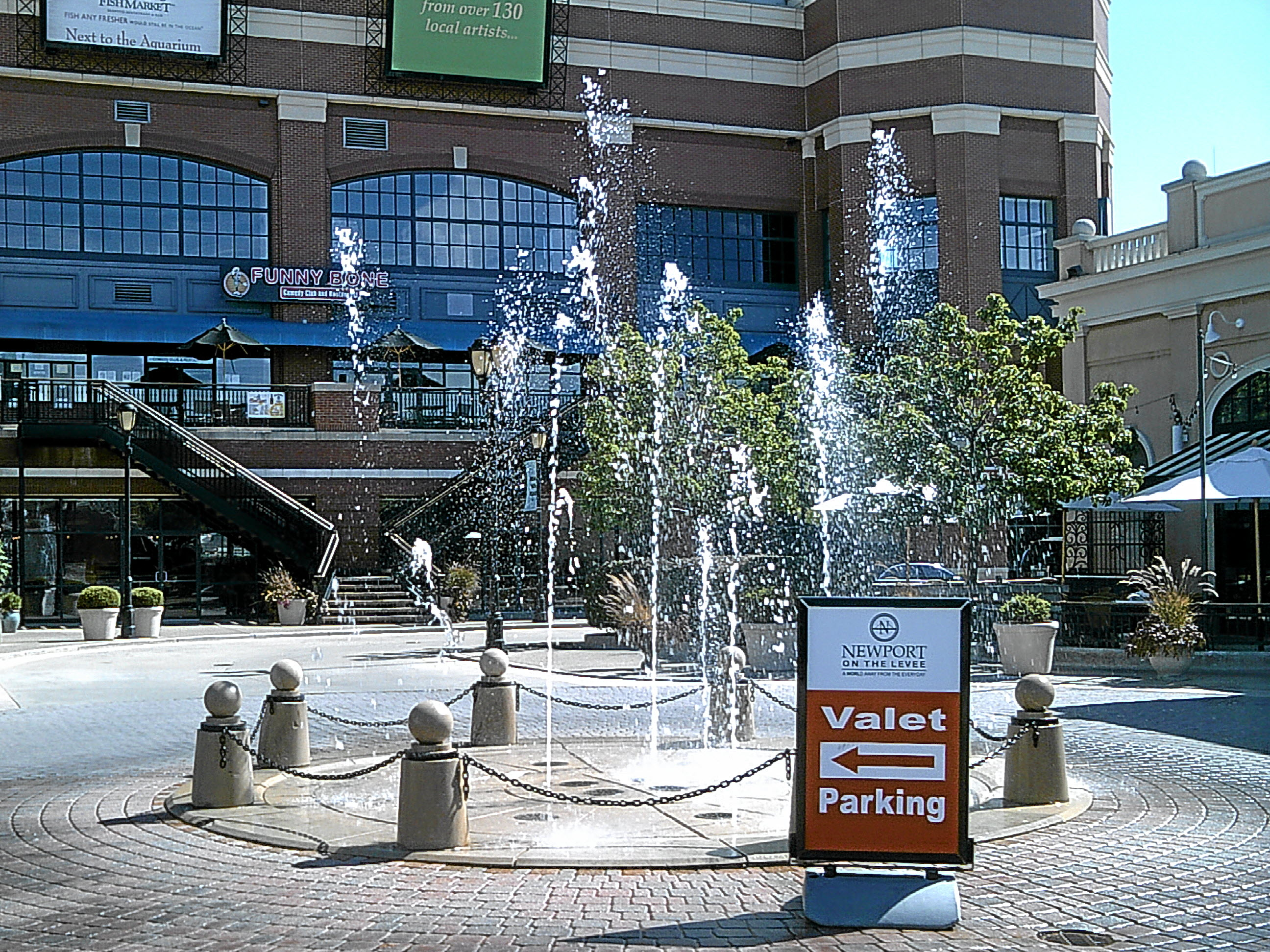

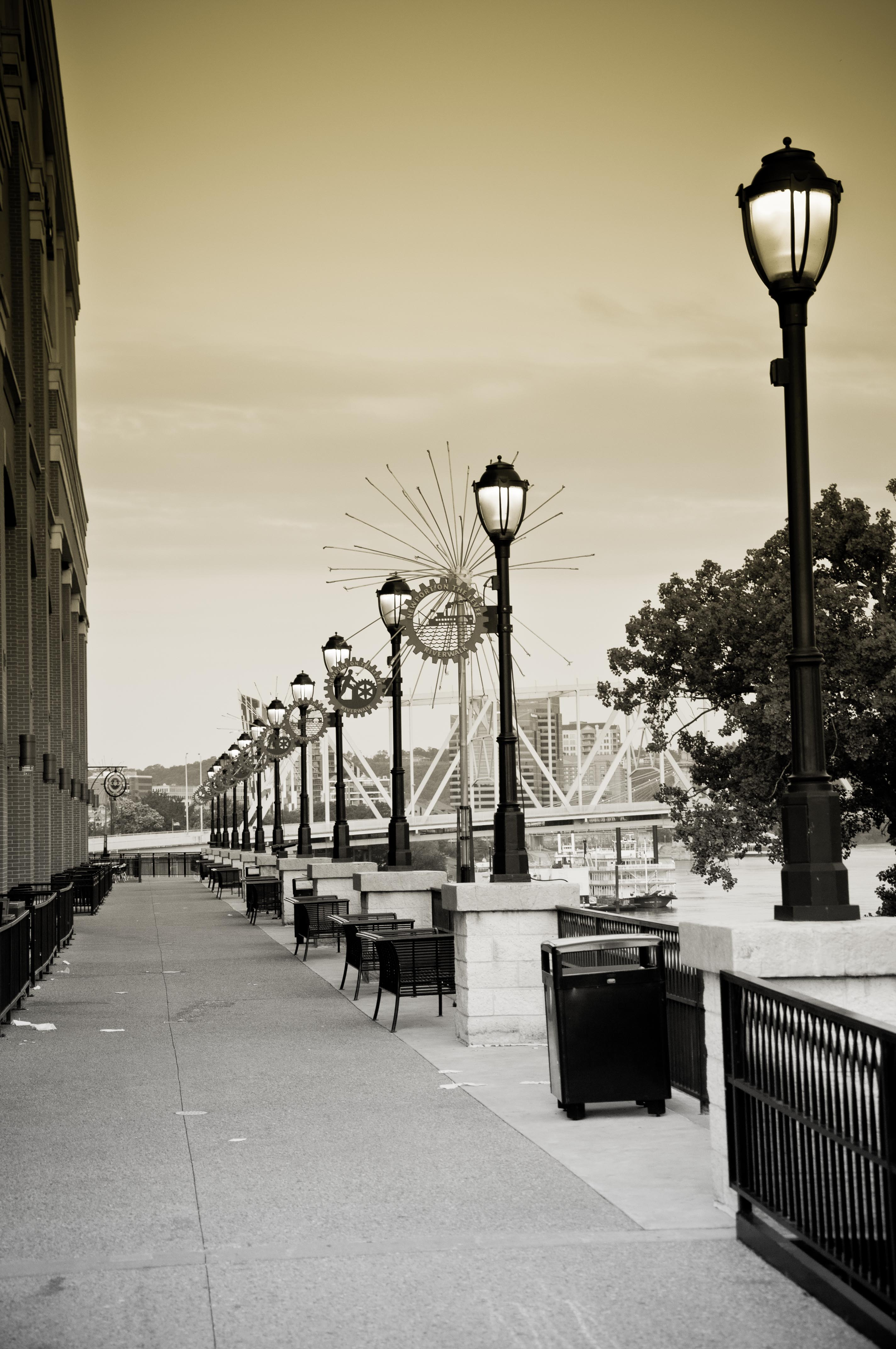

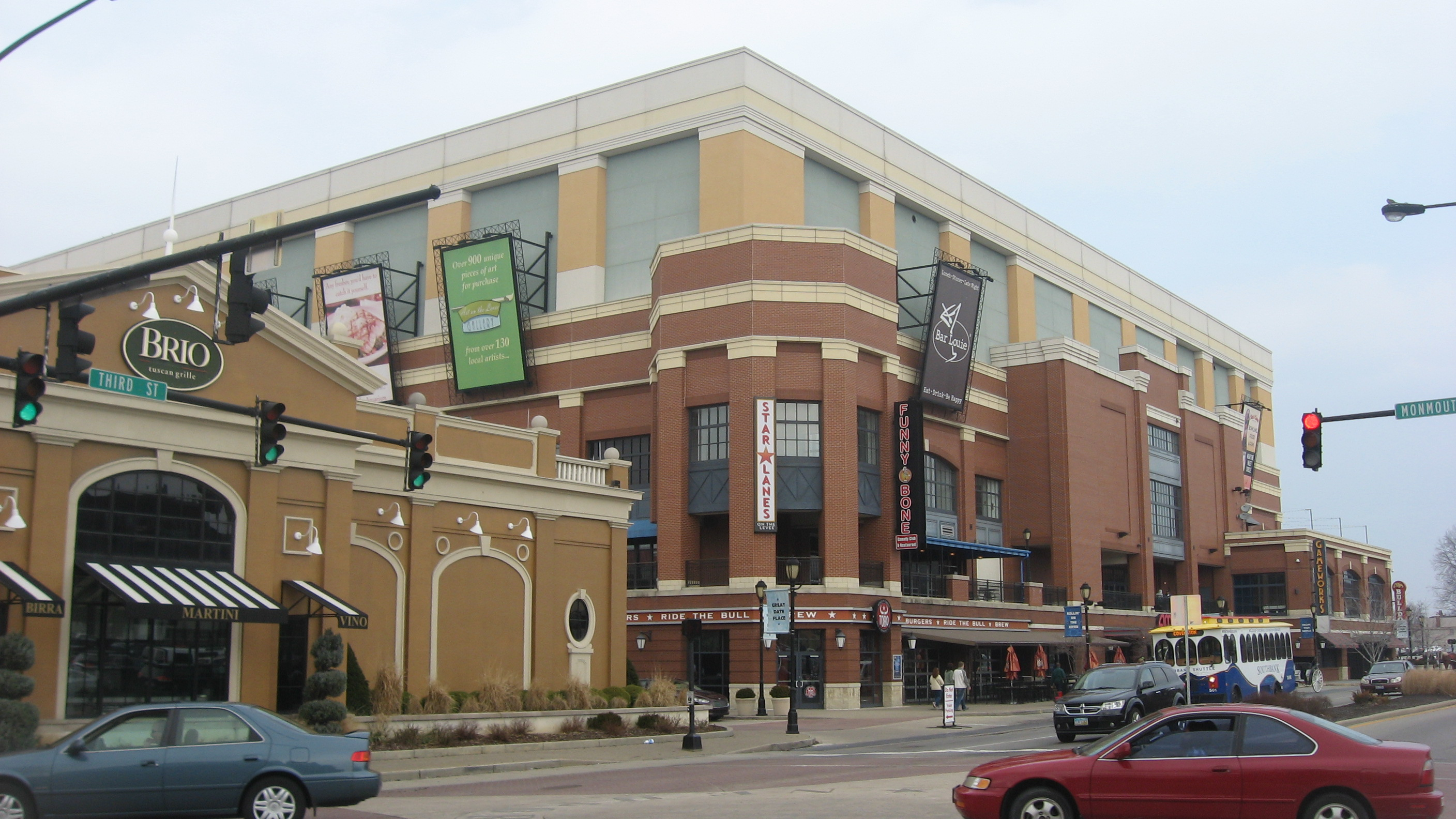

== See also ==
- Newport Aquarium
