= Mansion Hill Historic District =

Mansion Hill Historic District may refer to:

- Mansion Hill Historic District, in Newport, Kentucky, now included within East Row Historic District
- Mansion Hill Historic District (Madison, Wisconsin)
