= Purple People Bridge =

Newport Southbank Bridge
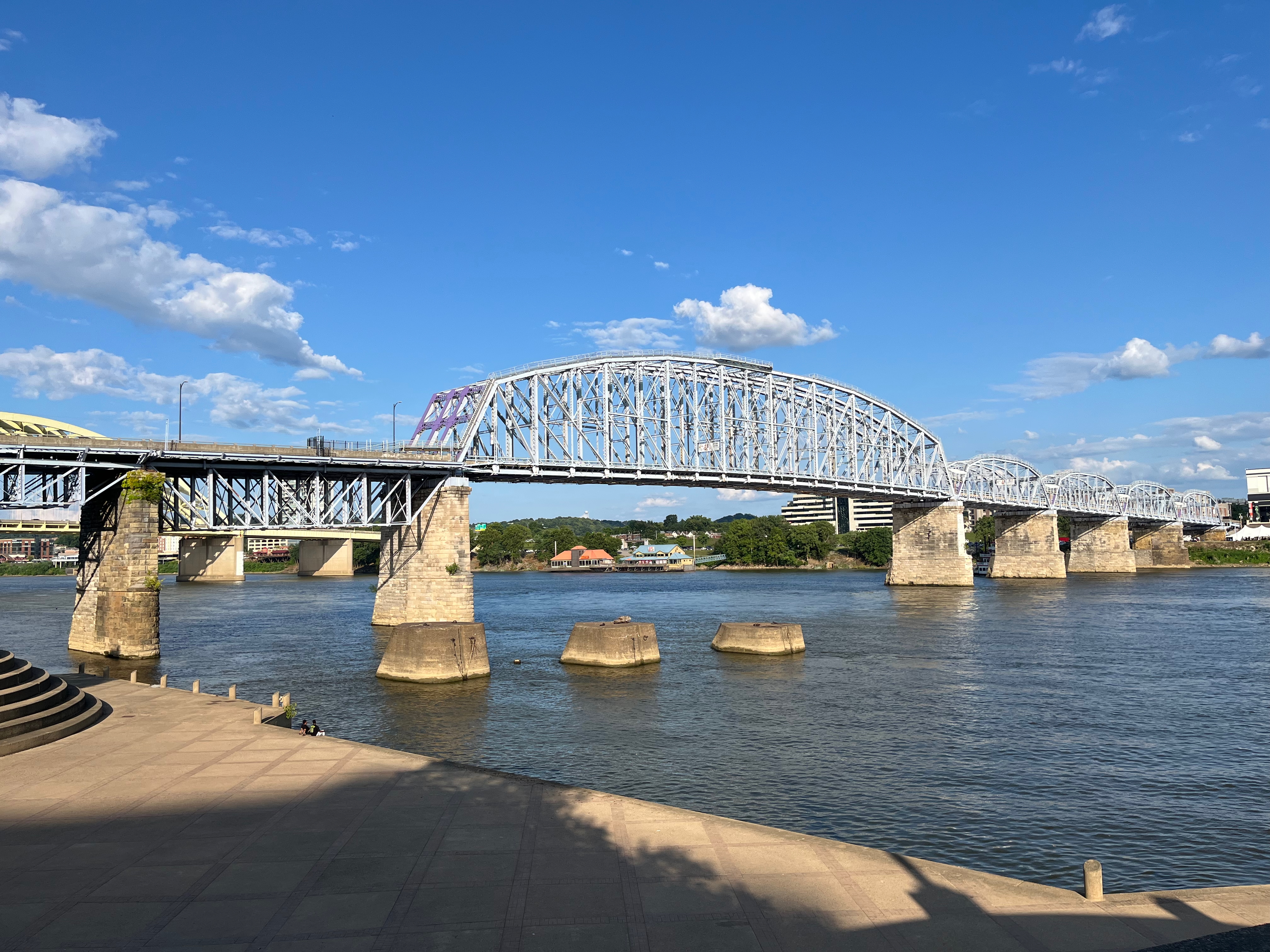
- The bridge in 2025
- Coordinates: 39°05′53″N 84°29′52″W
- Carries: Pedestrians
- Crosses: Ohio River
- Locale: Newport, Kentucky and Cincinnati, Ohio
- Other name: Purple People Bridge
- Website: purplepeoplebridge.com

Characteristics
- Design: Truss bridge
- Total length: 2,670 feet (810 m)
- Newport and Cincinnati Bridge
- U.S. National Register of Historic Places
- Location: Spans Ohio River, Cincinnati, Ohio
- Built: 1868–1872 (rebuilt 1896–1897)
- Architect: Becker, M.J.; et al.
- Architectural style: Subdivided Pratt truss
- NRHP reference No.: 01000364
- Added to NRHP: April 17, 2001

History
- Opened: April 1, 1872; (extensively rebuilt from 1896-1897)

Location
- Interactive map of Newport Southbank Bridge

The Purple People Bridge is a pedestrian-only bridge that stretches 2,670 feet over the Ohio River, connecting Newport, Kentucky to downtown Cincinnati, Ohio. It previously carried rail, streetcar, and vehicular traffic.

== History ==
=== Early history ===
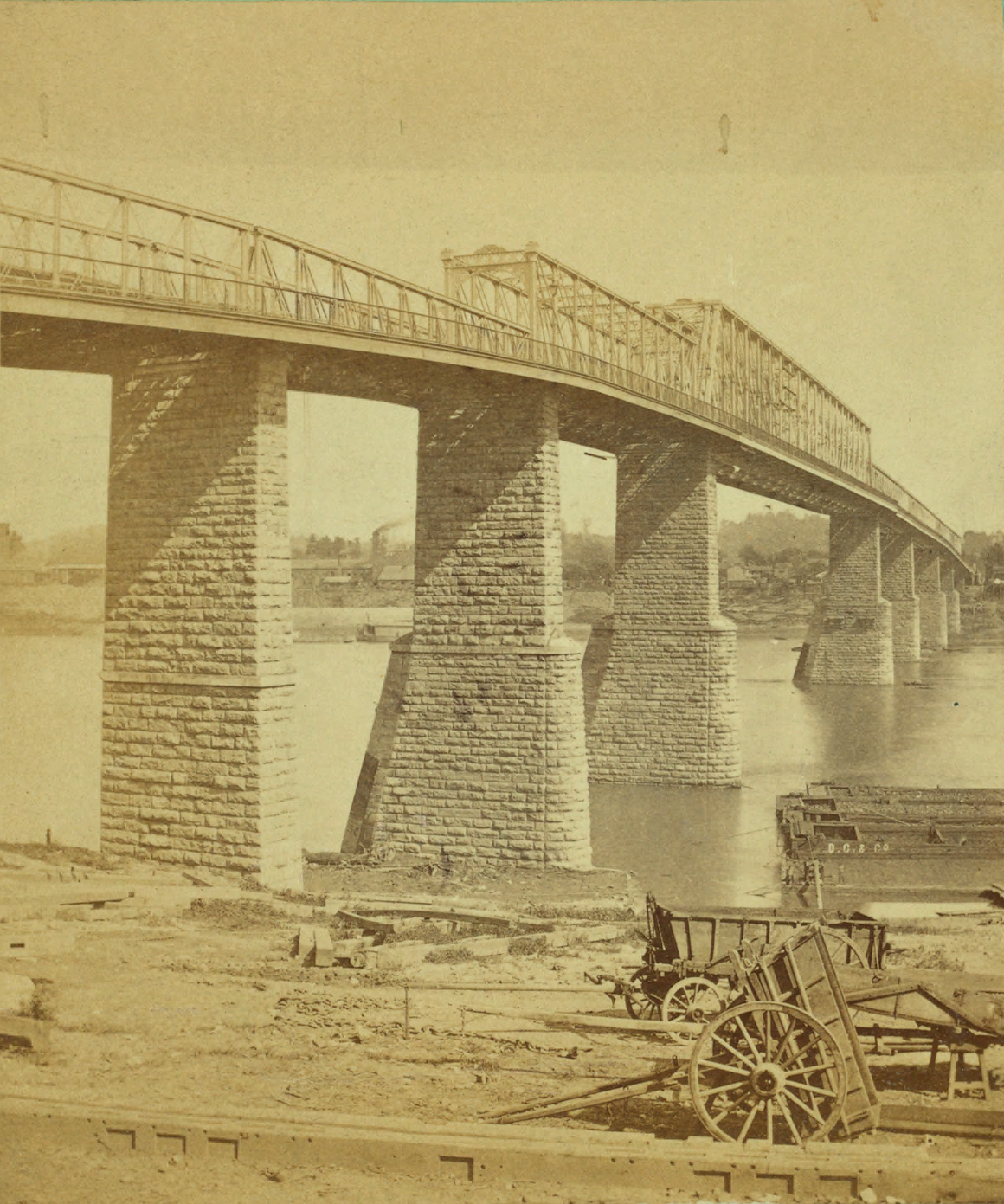
The bridge before its 1897 reconstruction.

The original bridge first opened on April 1, 1872, under the name Newport and Cincinnati Bridge, and was Cincinnati's first railroad bridge spanning the Ohio River. In its original configuration, the bridge had one railroad track and featured two roadways cantilevered outside the trusses. The bridge piers were built with stone from Adams County, Ohio.

In 1896 a reconstruction of the bridge began designed by engineer M. J. Becker. This was done to modernize the bridge, as it had become obsolete with the increased weight and frequency of trains. Tolls were to be collected on the carriage deck, in order to pay for the bridge's maintenance, as well as to make a profit. The piers were extended to the west, carrying two new streetcar decks and a vehicular deck between them. This work also rebuilt the existing railroad deck into a Pennsylvania truss and four Parker trusses. The bridge's approaches were also reconstructed. Work was completed in December 1897.

In 1904, the bridge was renamed the L&N (Louisville and Nashville) Railroad Bridge, when that company purchased it. Soon after, the vehicle deck was given a new asphalt driving surface for automobiles, among other improvements. After the opening of the Dixie Terminal's lower level on November 27, 1921, the CN&C's streetcar tracks were reconfigured to cross the nearby Central Bridge, and the L&N Railroad Bridge was restricted to emergency use only.

In 1928, the Kentucky Highway Department proposed purchasing the vehicular deck and streetcar deck alongside their respective truss section, in order to eliminate tolls. This was met with resistance from the L&N Railroad since the tolls started to become profitable with the increase in automobile traffic. However, the city threatened to build a competing bridge nearby, fearing this, a deal was eventually struck, and on November 15, 1935, these parts of the bridge were sold. Tolls were not removed immediately, as a three percent interest rate needed to be paid off. However, on November 11, 1941, at 2 p.m., tolls were abolished from the crossing after the bonds for the purchase had been paid off. An hour later, a dedication of the now free bridge by the mayor and other officials was held.

=== Mid to late 20th century ===
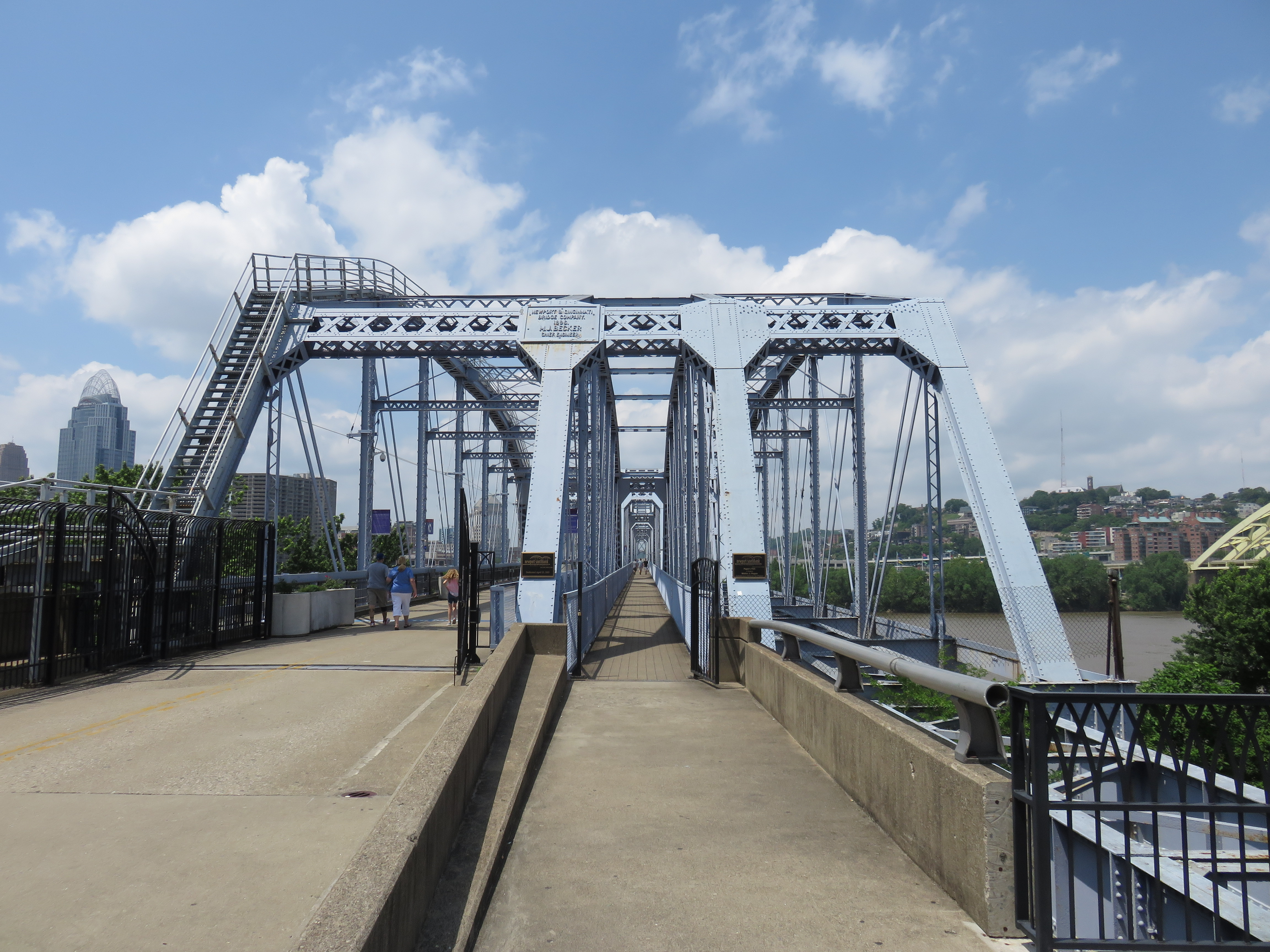
The bridge deck in 2017, viewed from the Newport side. The left portion is the former vehicular deck that is now used by pedestrians since the 2003 reopening of the bridge. The middle portion is the former east streetcar deck that was converted to pedestrian use after 1950. The right portion is the now-disused rail deck, which was abandoned in 1984.

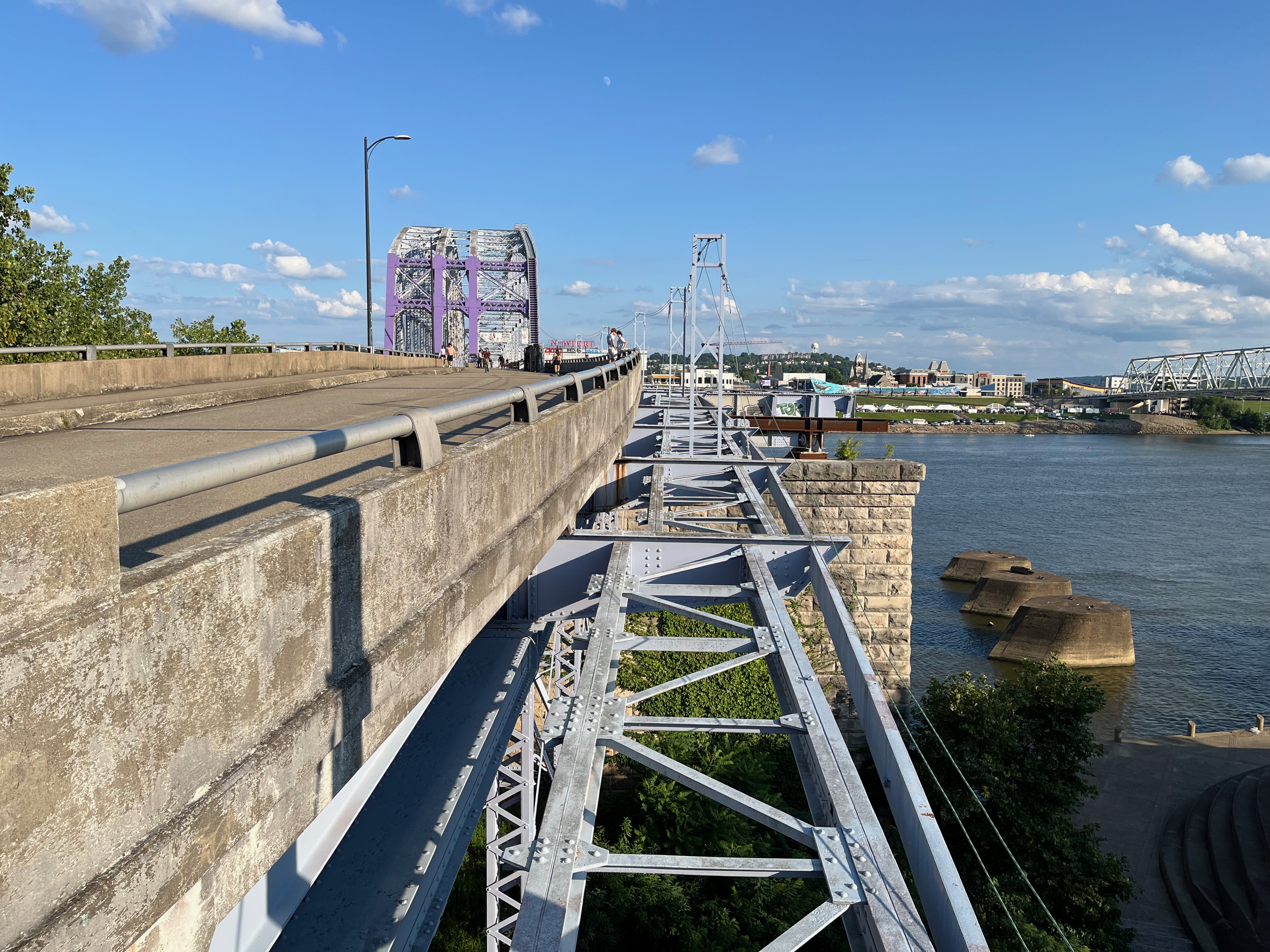
A remnant of the west streetcar deck remains on the Cincinnati side of the bridge, pictured in 2025

On July 3, 1950, the bridge's streetcar tracks were closed. The west track was for the most part demolished, and the east track was replaced by a new pedestrian walkway. In 1956, a loop ramp from 3rd Street was opened to traffic, replacing the at-grade intersection, while a new ramp was also built to connect to the Columbia Parkway, the latter of which was the reason the ramp was built. Also around this time, the railroad deck was altered to go in one direction at peak travel times in the mornings and evenings.

In the 1960s, there were proposals to replace the bridge as part of construction of Interstate 471. This never occurred, with the Big Mac Bridge instead being built nearby. In 1971, the Seaboard Coast Line Railroad (SCL) purchased the remainder of the L&N shares it did not already own, and the L&N, and by extension the bridge, came under their control. In 1980, the road and pedestrian trusses were repainted, and the road deck was replaced. SCL absorbed the L&N entirely in 1982 with the newly merged company known as Family Lines.

At the end of June 1984, the bridge's tracks were abandoned. In 1986, the SCL formally merged with the Chessie System, which became CSX Transportation (CSX). At this point, work began on demolishing the rail deck and demolishing the train deck, which was competed in 1987. Parts of the right of way for the approach became a public park as a result of the demolition.

Throughout the 1990s, the bridge was lightly used by automobiles. In addition, after the bridge's rail tracks were removed, the CSX ceased maintenance of them, resulting in a notable rust; while the rest of the crossing was still actively painted. In October 2001, after years of neglect, the vehicular deck was closed.

=== Reopening as pedestrian bridge ===
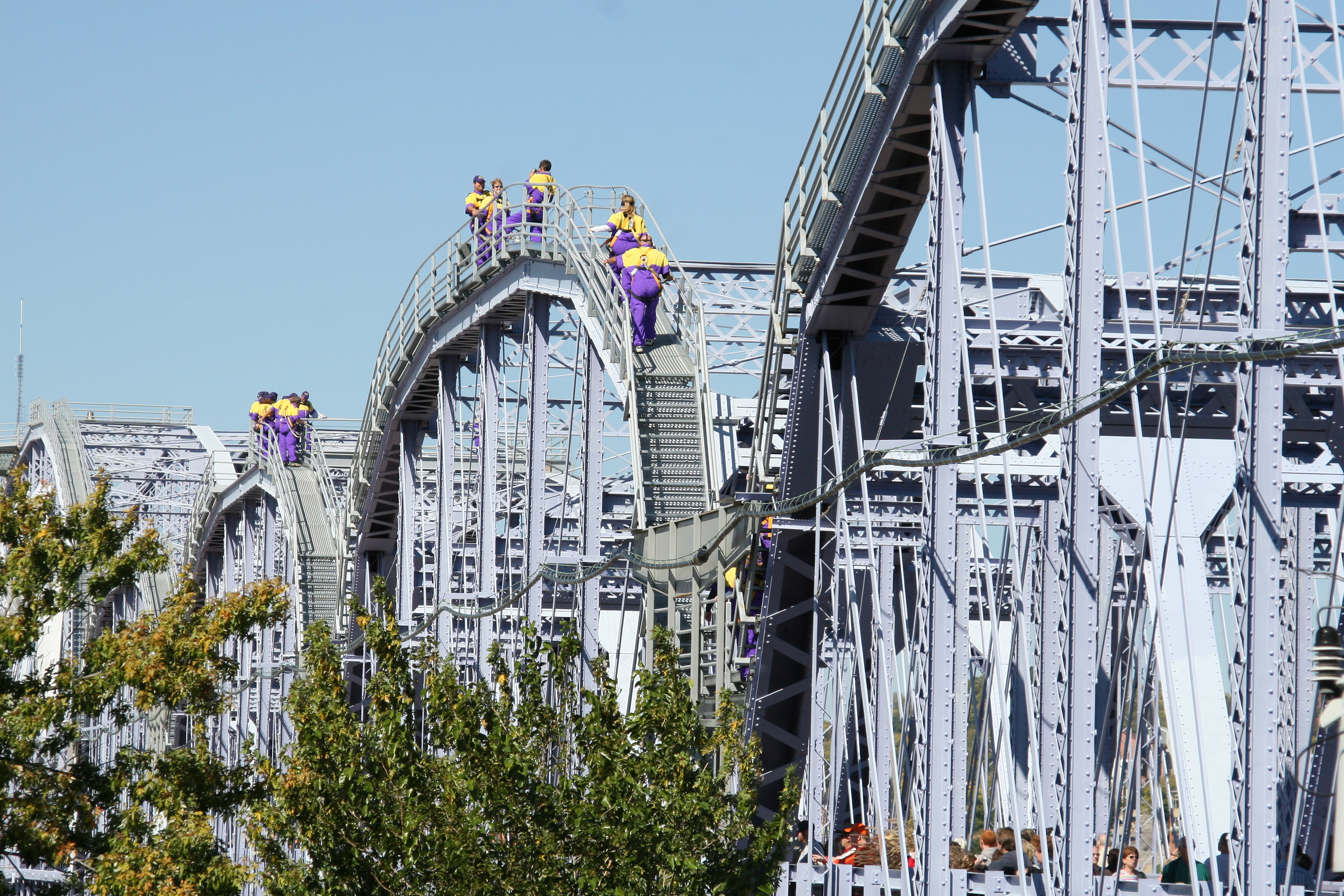
Purple-clad people crossing the Newport Southbank Bridge in 2006

At this point, the city of Newport, Kentucky, and Southbank Partners, a regional economic development organization, used $4 million in state funds to restore the bridge and convert the deck into a pedestrian one. When it was time to decide on what color to paint it, a variety of options were explored. Computer-generated images of the bridge were shown to participants in more than a dozen focus groups, all of whom picked the color purple as a top choice. It was soon nicknamed the "Purple People Bridge" by area residents. This project – which also involved demolishing the former 3rd Street loop ramp (which was obsolete due to the work) – was completed in May 2003.

In November 2005, the City of Newport and Southbank Partners, created the non-profit Newport Southbank Bridge Company. As part of this, the City of Newport deeded over all real property to the Purple People Bridge Company which took over maintenance the bridge (superstructure and approach on land in Newport, KY). Afterwards, the Bridge Company finalized a lease with the City of Cincinnati for the bridge deck on land in Cincinnati, OH, but did not include the bridge piers.

In 2006, it became possible for the public to cross the bridge via its superstructure, though only while wearing appropriate safety gear. There are similar bridge climb experiences in Australia and New Zealand. Citing lack of funds and low attendance, the Purple People Bridge Climb was discontinued on May 23, 2007. This required installation of repair platforms and relatively minor alterations to the truss.

In 2012, the Purple People Bridge Company announced it was considering building retail space on the bridge in order to fund work on it. However, they acknowledged that it might not be possible, as such, an engineer would have to see if it was or would need a retrofit to do such. While

In 2017, a monument of a dispute between Ohio and Kentucky that was resolved in 1980 was dedicated. In 2017, a proposal to repaint the bridge and install permanent lighting on the bridge was also made. The bridge was repaired in 2021 after damage from a flood. In 2022, the Newport Southbank Bridge and its owner was officially renamed the "Purple People Bridge", at which point the entryway arches in Cincinnati and Newport were also repainted purple.

In 2024, the bridge was temporarily closed after parts of the sandstone block fell off of the bridge pier in Cincinnati. Nobody was killed or injured in the accident. However, the incident brought attention to the lack of funding for structural maintenance. In September 2025, the city of Newport, Kentucky announced that it had officially assumed complete ownership of the bridge, after a vote made by the company's owner.

In April 2026, House Bill 900 passed which calls for $2 million to be distributed to Newport to support the installation of a new LED lighting system. In addition, construction and repairs are set to be made between April and August to provide a permanent solution to the structural damage that happened in 2024. Access to the bridge was closed between May 4 and June 8 on the Cincinnati side and other intermittent closures will happen throughout the summer.

== Gallery ==
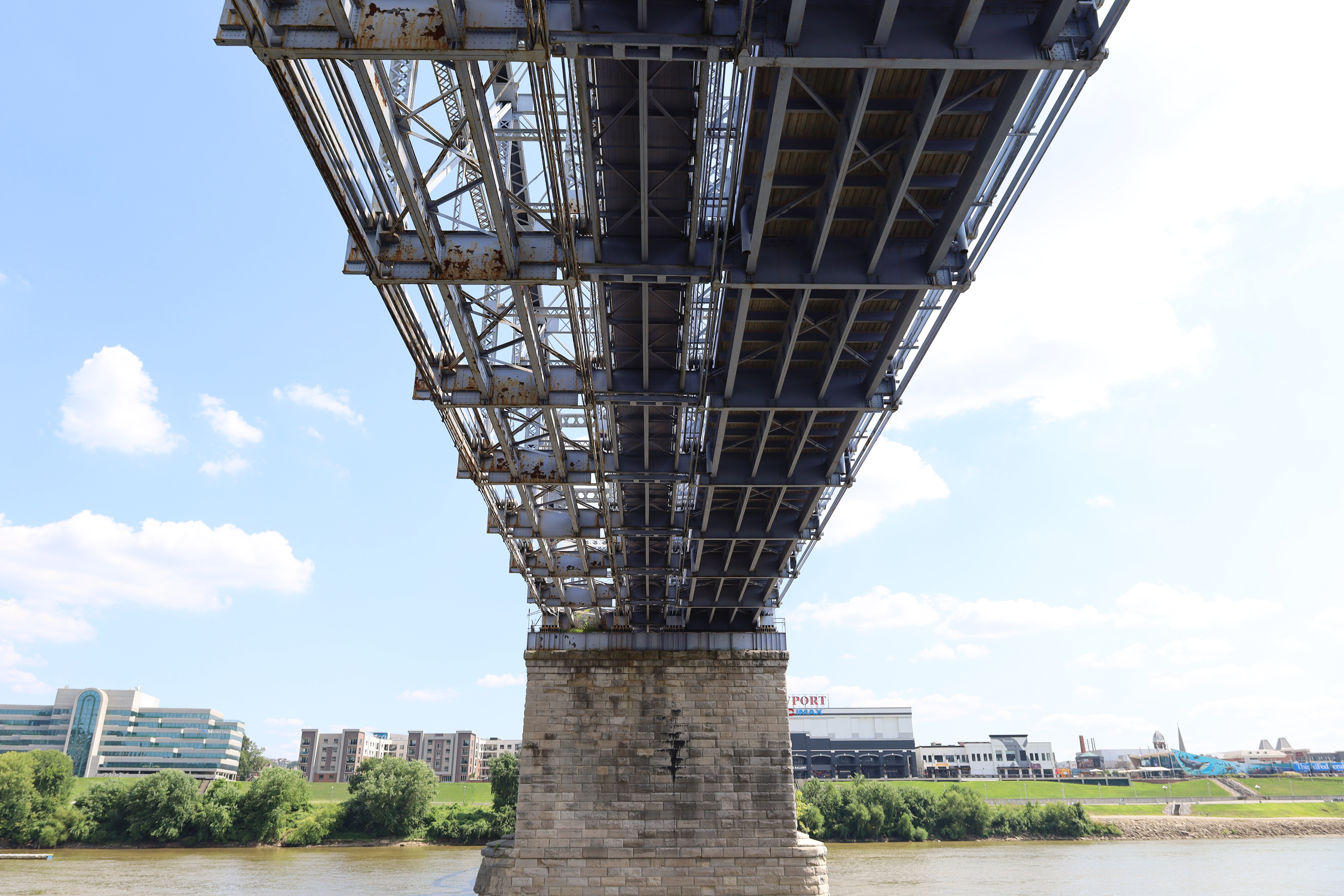
Underside viewed from the river

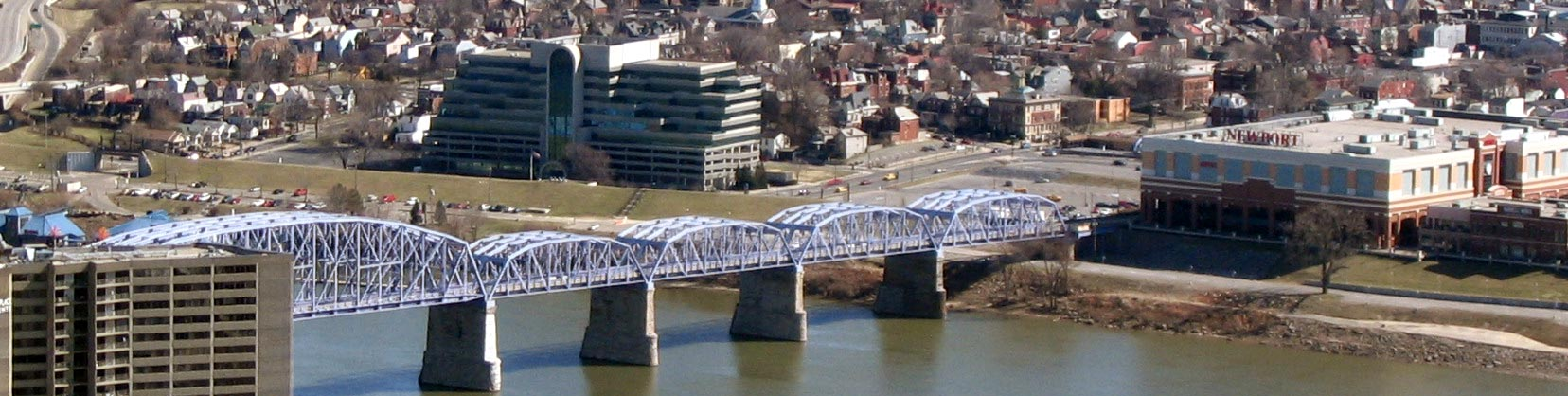
The bridge as viewed from the Carew Tower observation deck

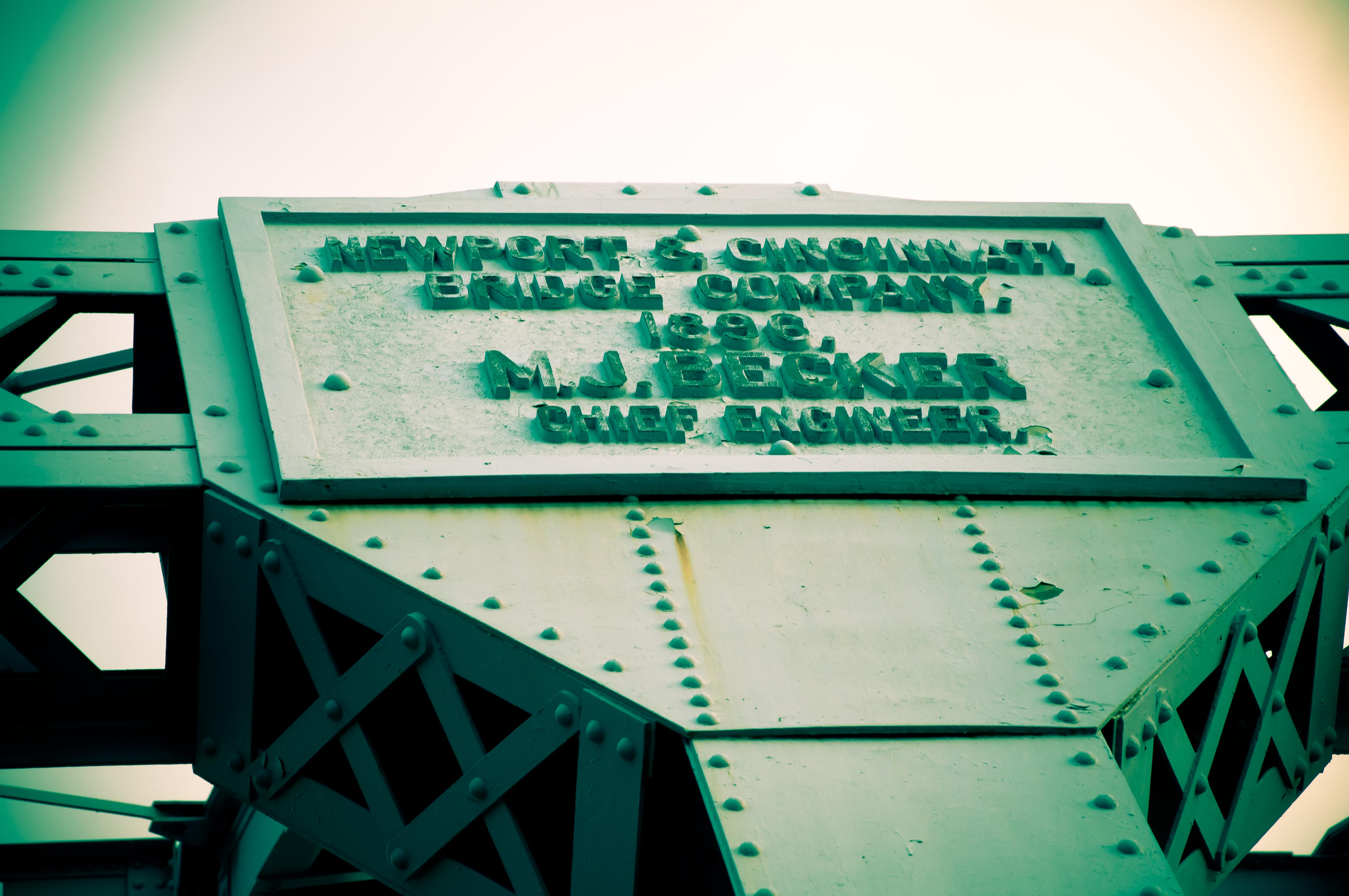
Bridge establishment plaque

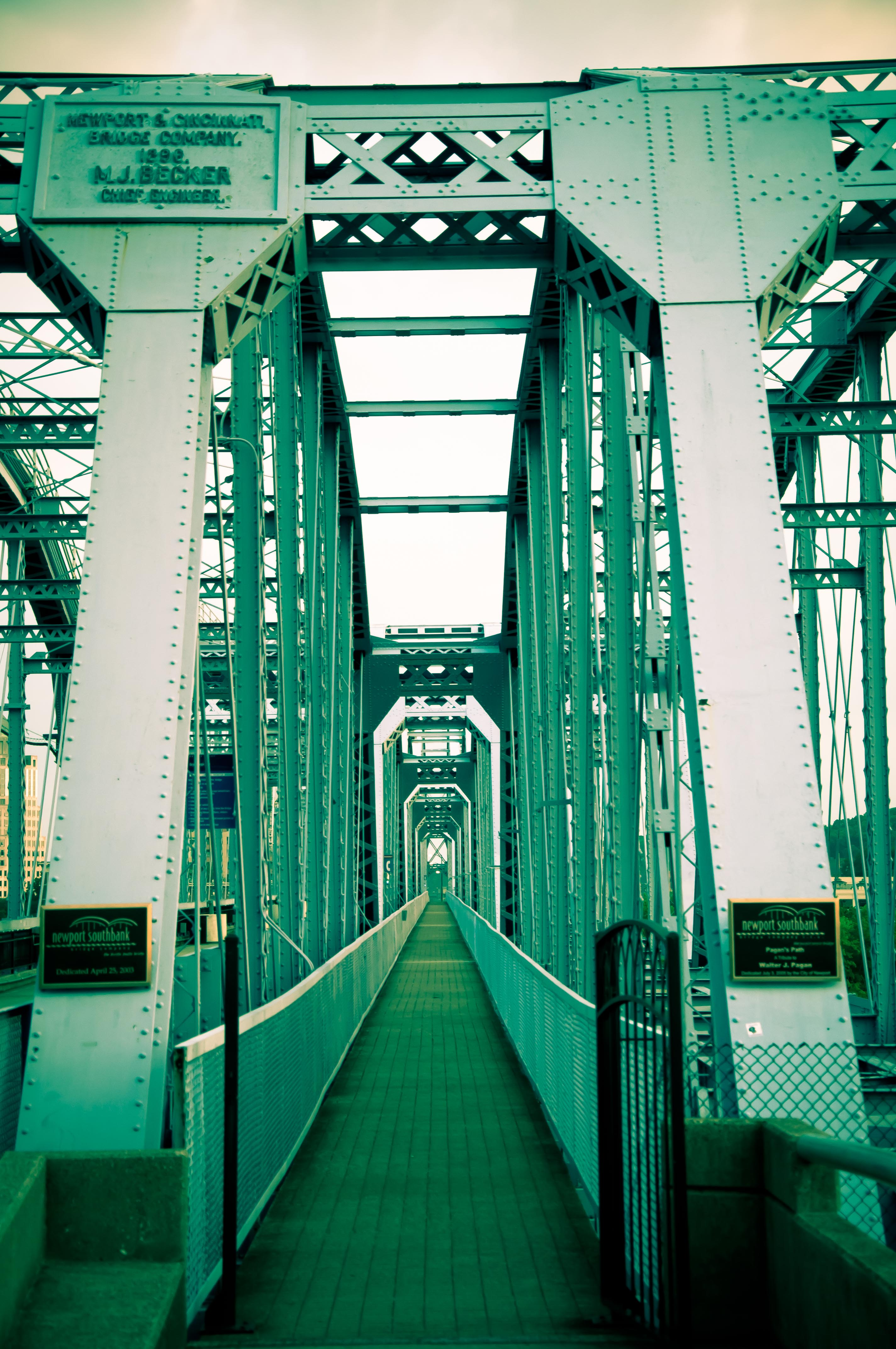
Pedestrian walkway on the bridge

== See also ==
- List of crossings of the Ohio River
