= Combs–Hehl Bridge =

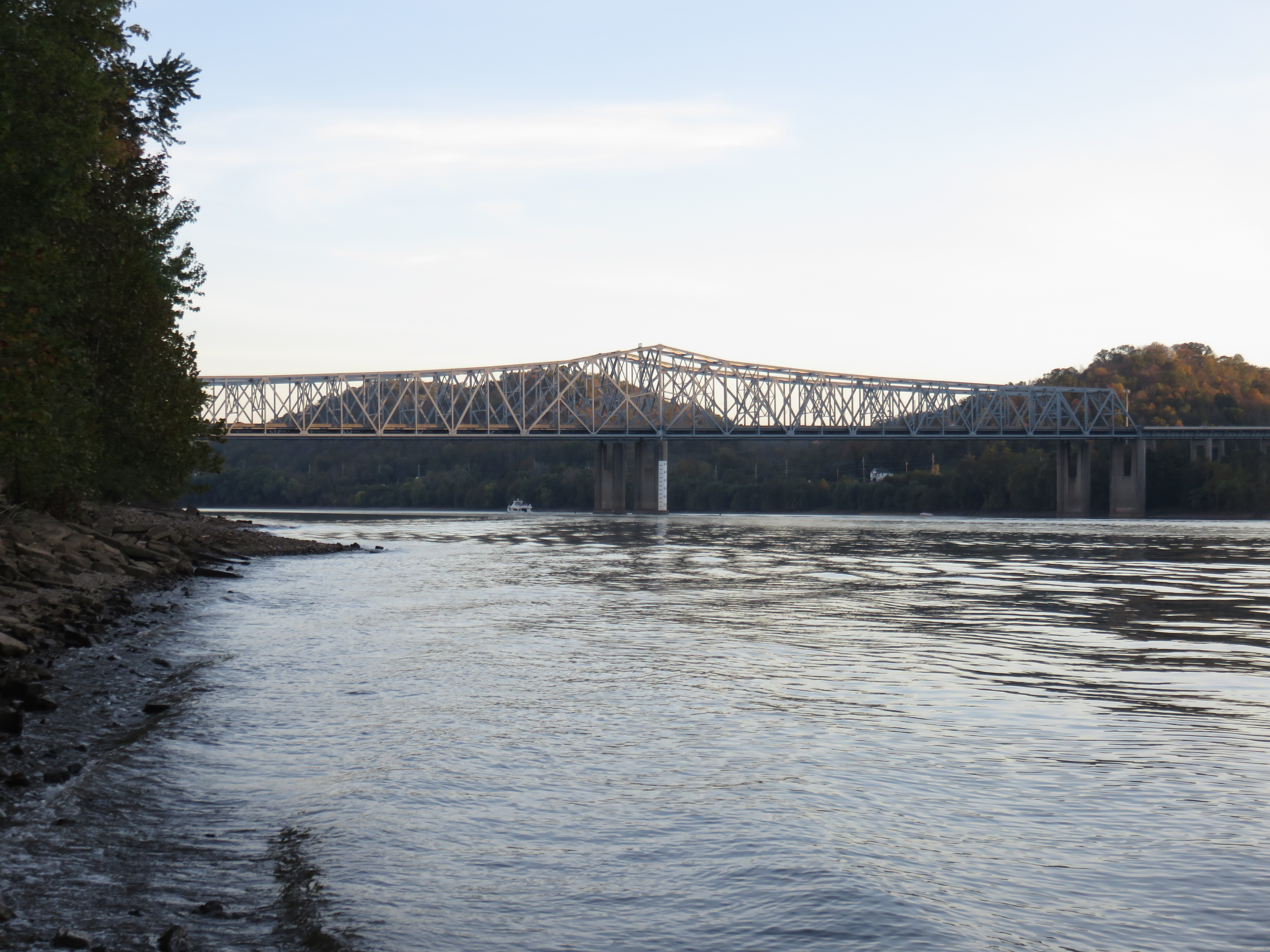
- Coordinates: 39.05849°N 84.43207°W
- Carries: 6 lanes of I-275
- Crosses: Ohio River
- Locale: California, Ohio and Highland Heights, Kentucky
- Maintained by: Kentucky Transportation Cabinet

Characteristics
- Design: Twin Cantilever bridge
- Total length: 460 meters (1,510 feet)
- Longest span: 219 meters (719 feet)

History
- Opened: December 1979

Statistics
- Daily traffic: 72,000

The Combs–Hehl Bridge is a twin span single pier cantilever bridge carrying Interstate 275 (I-275) across the Ohio River. It connects the Eastern portion of Cincinnati, Ohio and Campbell County, Kentucky.

The main span is 219 meters (719 feet) and the total length of each bridge is 460 meters (1,510 feet). The bridge is named for former governor of Kentucky Bert T. Combs and former Campbell County Judge Executive Lambert Hehl.

Normal traffic makes it faster for commuters from Cincinnati's eastern suburbs to travel from Ohio to Kentucky on the Combs-Hehl bridge, travel less than 2 miles on I-275, and then take I-471 North into downtown.

== See also ==
- List of crossings of the Ohio River
