= East Row Historic District =

Historic district in Kentucky, United States

- Mansion Hill Historic District and Boundary Increase
- U.S. National Register of Historic Places
- U.S. Historic district
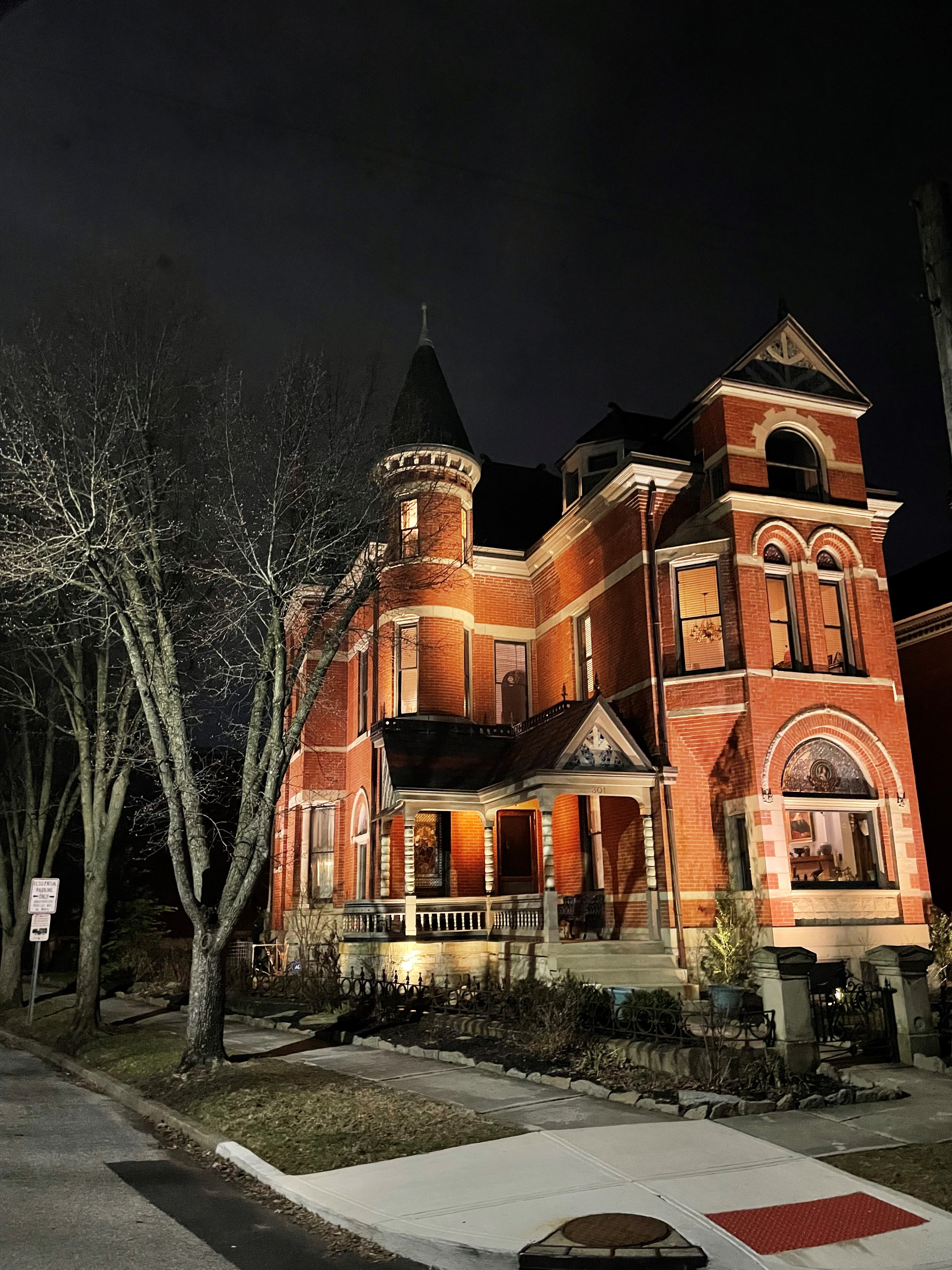
- The Thomas Mcilvain Mansion c. 1889

- Location within Kentucky Location within the United States
- Location: Roughly bounded by Interstate 471, Washington Ave., 2nd and 6th Sts.; also roughly bounded by Washington Ave., 6th, Saratoga and 3rd Sts., Newport, Kentucky
- Coordinates: 39°5′42″N 84°29′24″W
- Area: 44 acres (18 ha); 6 acres (2.4 ha)
- Architectural style: Second Empire, Greek Revival, Victorian
- NRHP reference No.: 80001493; 85001678
- Added to NRHP: July 17, 1980; August 1, 1985

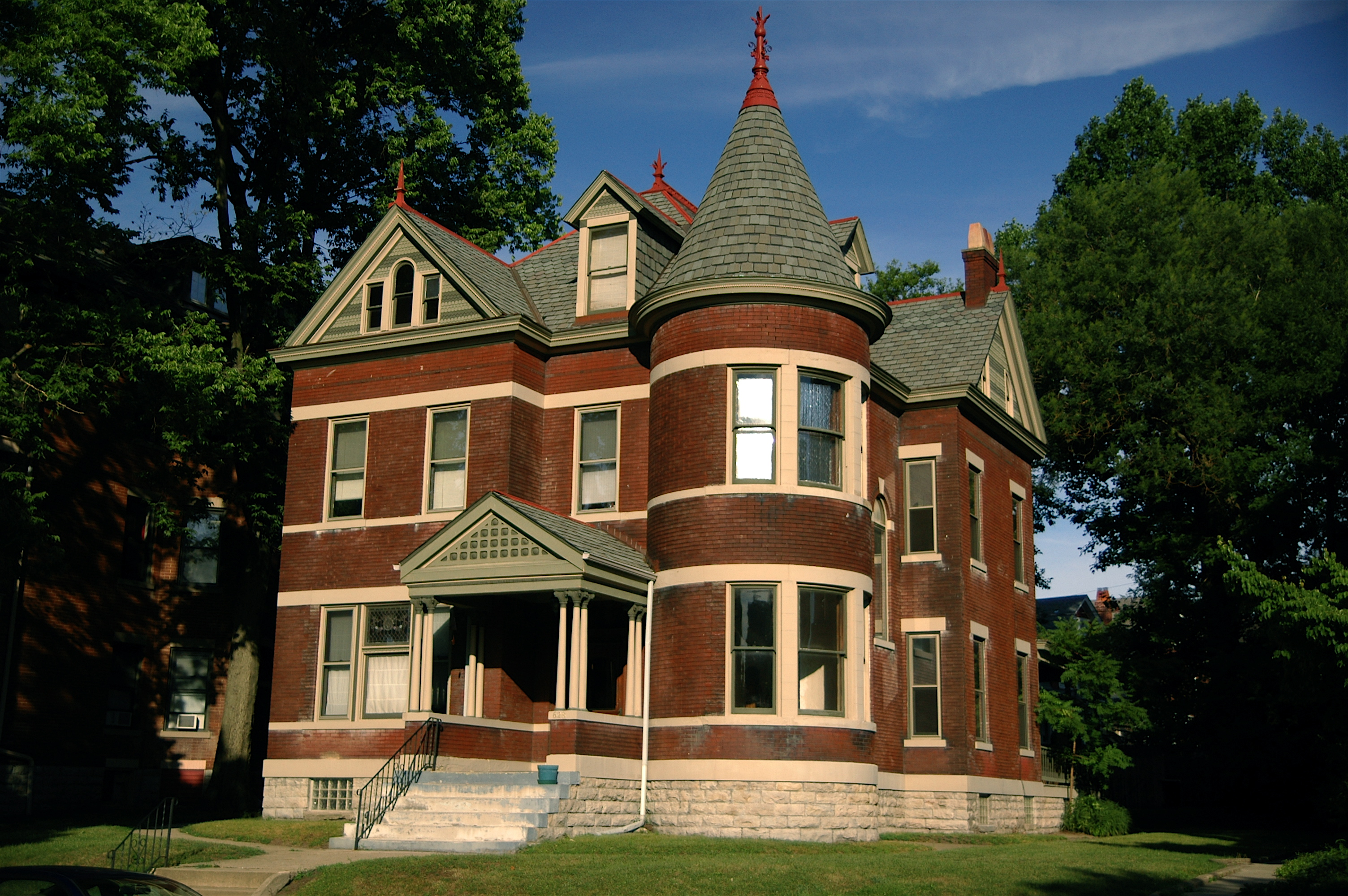

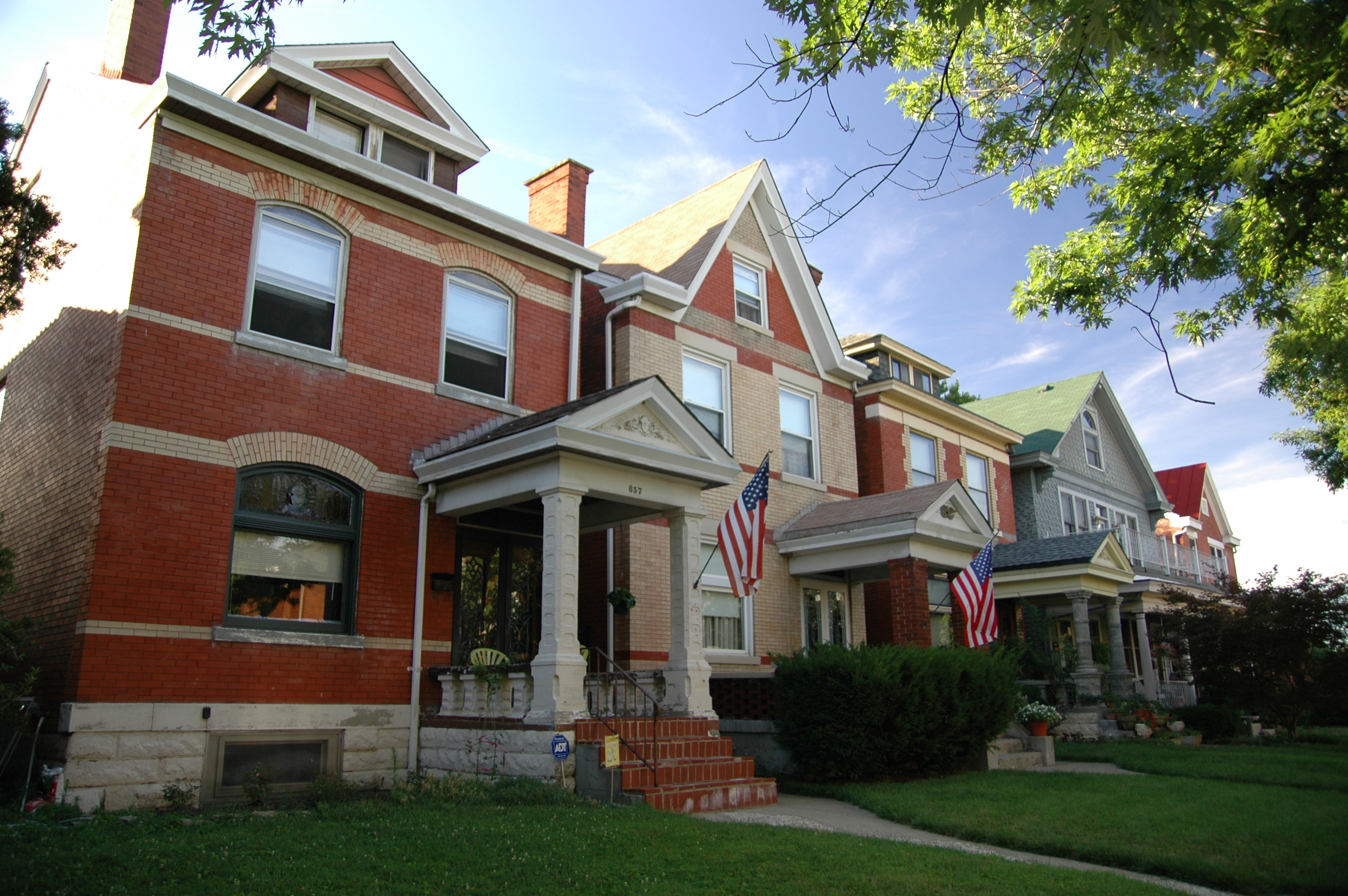

East Row Historic District is the second-largest Historic District in the Commonwealth of Kentucky. It is located in Newport, Kentucky. The East Row was created by joining two of Newport's historic neighborhoods—Mansion Hill and Gateway.

General James Taylor Jr. pioneered Newport in the 1790s on 1,500 acres (6.1 km^{2}) inherited from his father. His father, James Taylor Sr., bought 2,700 acres (11 km^{2}) of land in Northern Kentucky from his friend George Muse, which was part of the land Muse had been awarded for his military service in the French and Indian War. James Taylor Jr. brought to Newport his wealthy new wife Keturah Moss Leitch.

Well-connected with Washington politics, The Taylor family had two cousins, James Madison and Zachary Taylor, who later become presidents of the United States. The Taylors brought colonial culture to Northern Kentucky.

Taylor chose a high hill overlooking the Ohio River to build his large home (Bellevue, still standing today) in the Greek Revival style. At his death in 1848, James Taylor Jr. was said to be one of the wealthiest men in the state of Kentucky, with an estate valued at more than $4 million.

In the mid-19th century, Newport became a hub for trade, industry and culture. The Victorian era was Newport's most affluent period, as is evident by the East Row's elegant houses, which look much as they did more than 100 years ago. The establishment of the East Row was made possible when, motivated by Newport's rapid growth, the grandson of Gen. James Taylor decided to subdivide the family's estate as Taylor's Row Addition. The area became a favorite of wealthy business owners and merchants in the late 19th century. East Row Historic District is home to 1,070 homes and is Kentucky's second-largest historic district. All buildings in East Row have the distinction of being listed on the National Register of Historic Places. Early houses, near the western edge of the district, were built in the Italianate style, later homes were built in Queen Anne, the Colonial Revival and American Foursquare style.

By the late 1970s the neighborhood had fallen on hard times, Many of the large homes were cut into many small apartments. Property prices were low and the neighborhood became attractive to urban pioneers. The Mansion Hill Neighborhood Association was founded in 1979. Owners started to restore the many beautiful homes and expose the former beauty. The Mansion Hill Tour was begun in 1979, attracting more residents to the neighborhood. In the early 1980s, many of the most active preservationists lived in the Gateway neighborhood, the two neighborhoods combined forces in the mid-1980s.

Just blocks away from East Row, the city's riverfront and northern business district are undergoing redevelopment, with Riverboat Row and Newport on the Levee attracting new restaurants and clubs. The World Peace Bell and the Newport Aquarium are just steps away from the Historic District.

In mid-2006, the Newport City Commission expanded the Historic District, including the north side of Second Street, the west side of Washington Avenue, and the 200 block of East Fourth Street. East Fourth Street has several American Civil War era homes, including some in the Greek Revival style.
