= Hahl =

Hahl is a surname. Notable people with the surname include:

- Albert Hahl (1868–1945), German colonial administrator
- Riku Hahl (born 1980), Finnish ice hockey player
- Taavi Hahl (1847–1880), Finnish singer and singing teacher
- Tom Hahl (born 1965), Finnish ten-pin bowler

== See also ==
- Hehl
