= Hehl =

Hehl is a surname. Notable people with the surname include:

- Jake Hehl (1899–1961), American baseball player
- Lambert Hehl (born 1924), American politician
- Maximilian Emil Hehl (1861–1916), Brazil-based German engineer and architect
- Ulrich von Hehl (born 1947), German historian
