= Daniel Carter Beard Bridge =

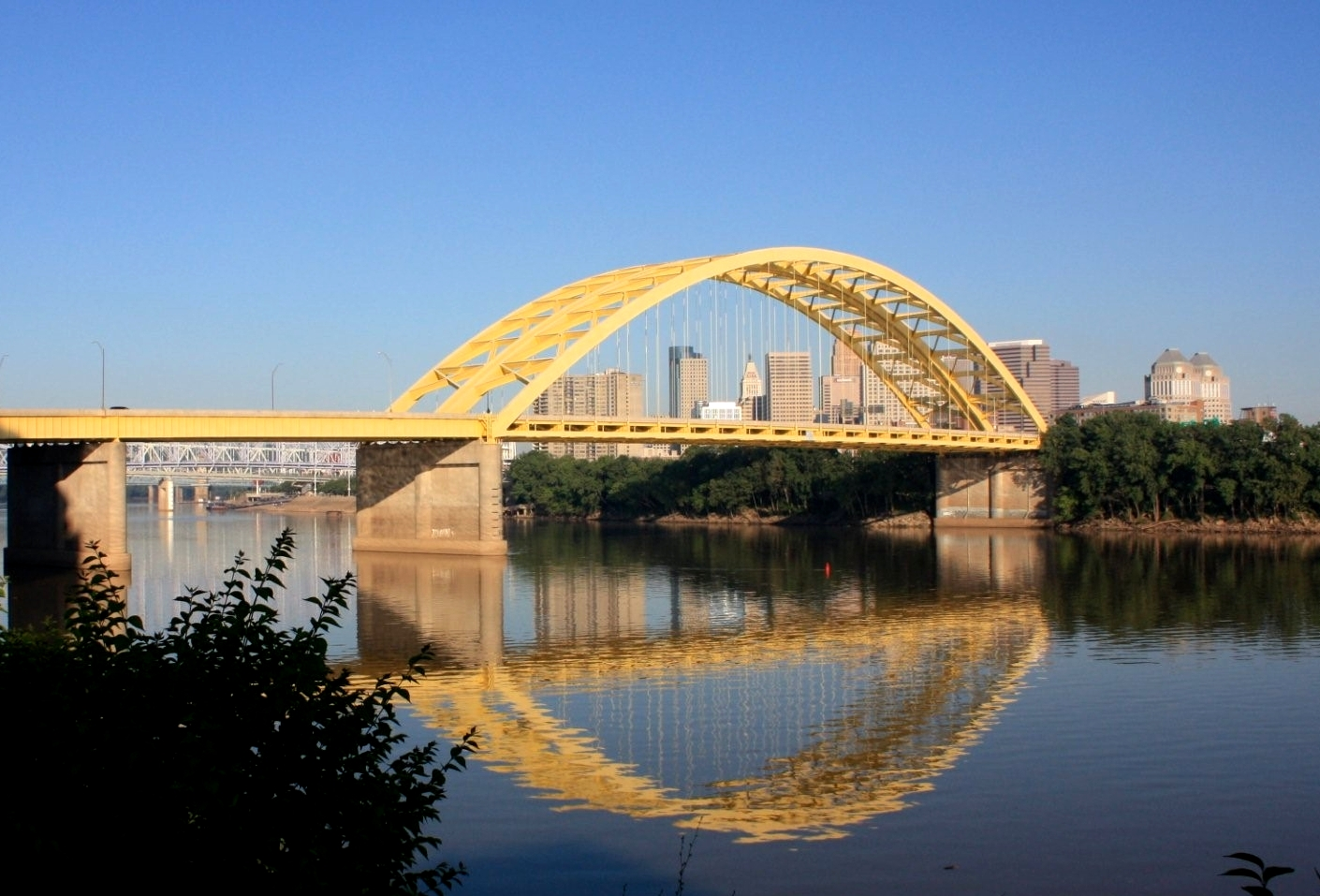
- Coordinates: 39.1006°N 84.4945°W
- Carries: 8 lanes of I-471
- Crosses: Ohio River
- Locale: Newport, Kentucky and Cincinnati, Ohio
- Other name: Big Mac Bridge
- Maintained by: Kentucky Transportation Cabinet

Characteristics
- Design: Twin bowstring arch bridges
- Total length: 639.93 meters (2,099.5 feet)
- Width: 15.27 meters (50.1 feet)
- Longest span: 230.92 meters (757.6 feet)
- Clearance above: 5.49 meters (18 feet)

History
- Construction cost: $14 million
- Opened: January 1976 (southbound); December 1976 (northbound)

Statistics
- Daily traffic: 97,900

Location
- Interactive map of Daniel Carter Beard Bridge

The Daniel Carter Beard Bridge (also known colloquially as the Big Mac Bridge), is a yellow twin span steel bowstring arch bridge crossing the Ohio River in Cincinnati, Ohio. It carries Interstate 471 between Cincinnati, Ohio, and Newport, Kentucky. It has a main span of 750 feet (230 m) and has a total span of 2,100 feet (640 m).

== Name ==
The bridge is named in honor of Daniel Carter Beard, the founder of the Sons of Daniel Boone and one of the founders of the Boy Scouts of America. The name was chosen in a poll conducted by the Kentucky Department of Transportation in 1976. Of the more than 17,000 ballots submitted by Northern Kentucky and Southwestern Ohio residents, more than half went to Beard. It was believed to be the first time a major Interstate bridge was named in a popular poll. One of the other four names on the ballot, former Kentucky governor Bert Combs, would later be applied to the Combs–Hehl Bridge just upriver.

The nickname, "Big Mac Bridge", comes from the yellow arches being similar to the "Golden Arches" logo of McDonald's restaurant. The nickname was coined by local residents after the bridge's golden arches were constructed. In the 1980s, McDonald's considered opening a floating restaurant at the base after the nickname caught on, but never went to construction.

== History ==
The downriver span carrying southbound traffic opened on January 28, 1976. Opening of the upstream span carrying northbound traffic was delayed until October 29 due to earth slippage on the Ohio side. At the request of the Dan Beard Council, the bridge's formal dedication was delayed until February 13, 1977. The day was proclaimed "Daniel Carter Beard Day" by Kentucky governor Julian Carroll, Ohio governor Jim Rhodes, Cincinnati mayor Jim Luken, and Newport mayor John Peluso. About 1,000 scouts attended the dedication ceremony in observance of National Scouting Month.

The bridge was originally configured with three lanes and an emergency shoulder on each span. In December 2000, with the completion of a reconstruction project on the 3rd Street Viaduct approach, the bridge was reconfigured to four lanes on each span. The bridge was originally designed by Hazelet + Erdal, now URS Corporation.

In the early morning hours of November 1, 2024, a fire beneath the bridge in Sawyer Point Park spread to the park's playground, engulfing the bridge in flames and causing structural damage. The southbound lanes were closed due to the need for extensive repairs. On December 10, 2024, four people were arrested for causing the fire. The repairs included the replacement of seven steel girders. The bridge was expected to fully reopen in March 2025. The bridge reopened ahead of schedule on February 9, 2025.

== See also ==
- List of crossings of the Ohio River
- List of longest arch bridge spans
