= Newport Aquarium =

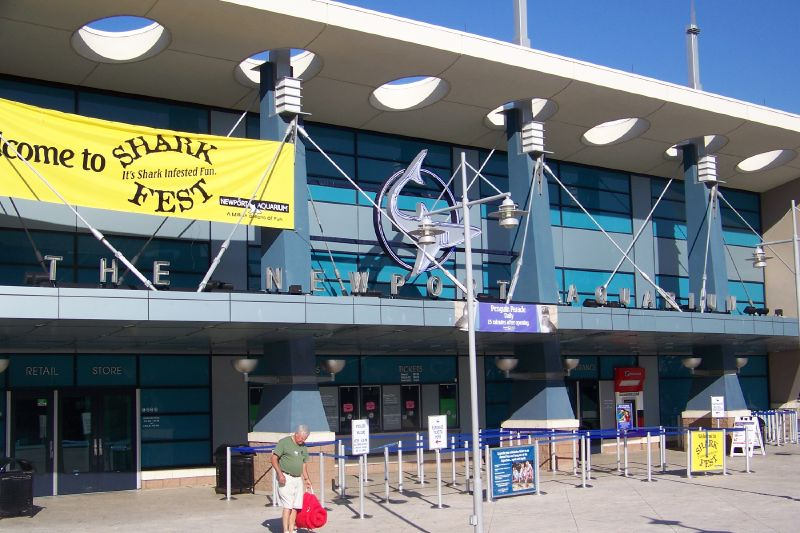
- Interactive map of Newport Aquarium
- 39.0943725°N 84.4975877°W
- Date opened: May 1, 1999
- Location: Newport, Kentucky, U.S.
- No. of animals: 20,000
- No. of species: 90+
- Total volume of tanks: 1,000,000 US gal (3,800,000 L)
- Memberships: AZA
- Major exhibits: 12
- Owner: Herschend
- Public transit: TANK
- Website: www.newportaquarium.com

The Newport Aquarium is a public aquarium located in Newport, Kentucky.

== Overview ==
The Newport Aquarium located within the Newport on the Levee shopping mall is owned by Herschend. Newport Aquarium is an accredited member of the Association of Zoos and Aquariums.

The Aquarium has 70 exhibits, 14 galleries, and consists of 1,000,000 US gal (3,800,000 L) of water, including five acrylic tunnels totaling over 200 ft (61 metres) in length. It is the first aquarium to successfully breed shark rays. It also has a collection of reptiles, including an albino alligator. It includes a "shark bridge" where exhibit patrons can walk across a rope bridge with protective nets and rope guards across a special aquarium with actual sharks.

== Shark Ray breeding program ==
The breeding program was founded in 2007. The shark ray breeding program was one of the first of its kind, and two sharks produced offspring. However, the process was difficult due to the tendency of shark rays to engage in rough copulation, which previously resulted in the death of one of the females. As of now, the aquarium displays two adult shark rays, Scooter and Shan.

== Outreach programs ==
Mobile Shark Cart is a mobile cart that is taken offsite to raise awareness of shark conservation.

The WAVE program promotes the importance of ocean conservation, leadership, and STEM to youth. Individuals can go behind the scenes with a staff member to see how the aquarium works and learn about the conservation programs and species at the aquarium.

== Seasonal events ==
Mermaid's Cove is an interactive event in which guests see and talk to performers dressed as mermaids about ocean conservation in the Shark Ray Bay Theater and Coral Reef tank. This event is normally scheduled during September.

A performer dressed as Scuba Santa appears between the end of November through January 1 each year, excluding Christmas Day. He can be seen in the shark tank with his elves.

== Albino alligator ==
The Newport Aquarium is home to a female albino American alligator named Snowflake. She is six feet long and weighs nearly 95 pounds. There are fewer than 100 albino alligators known in the world today.

== Gallery ==
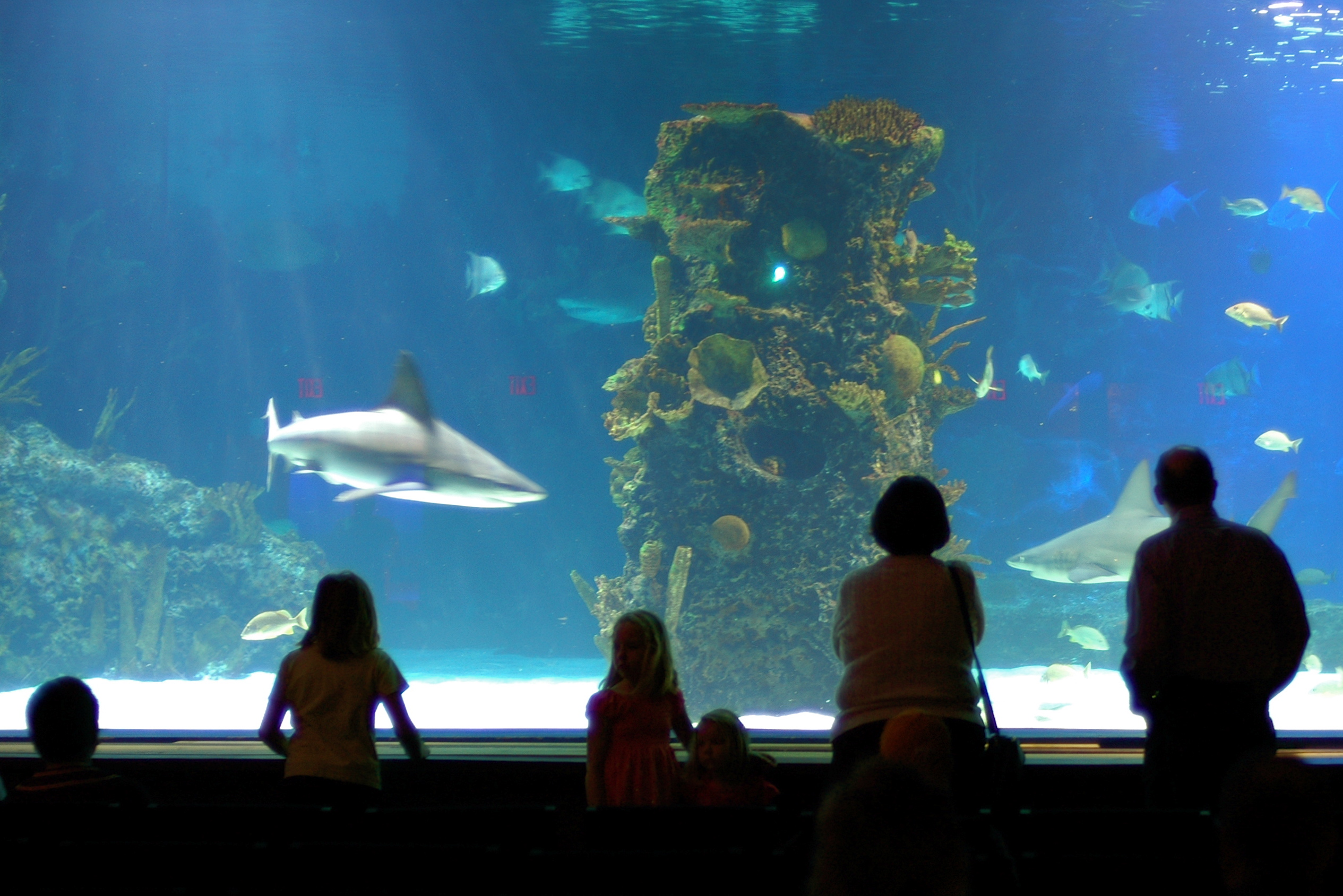
Shark tank

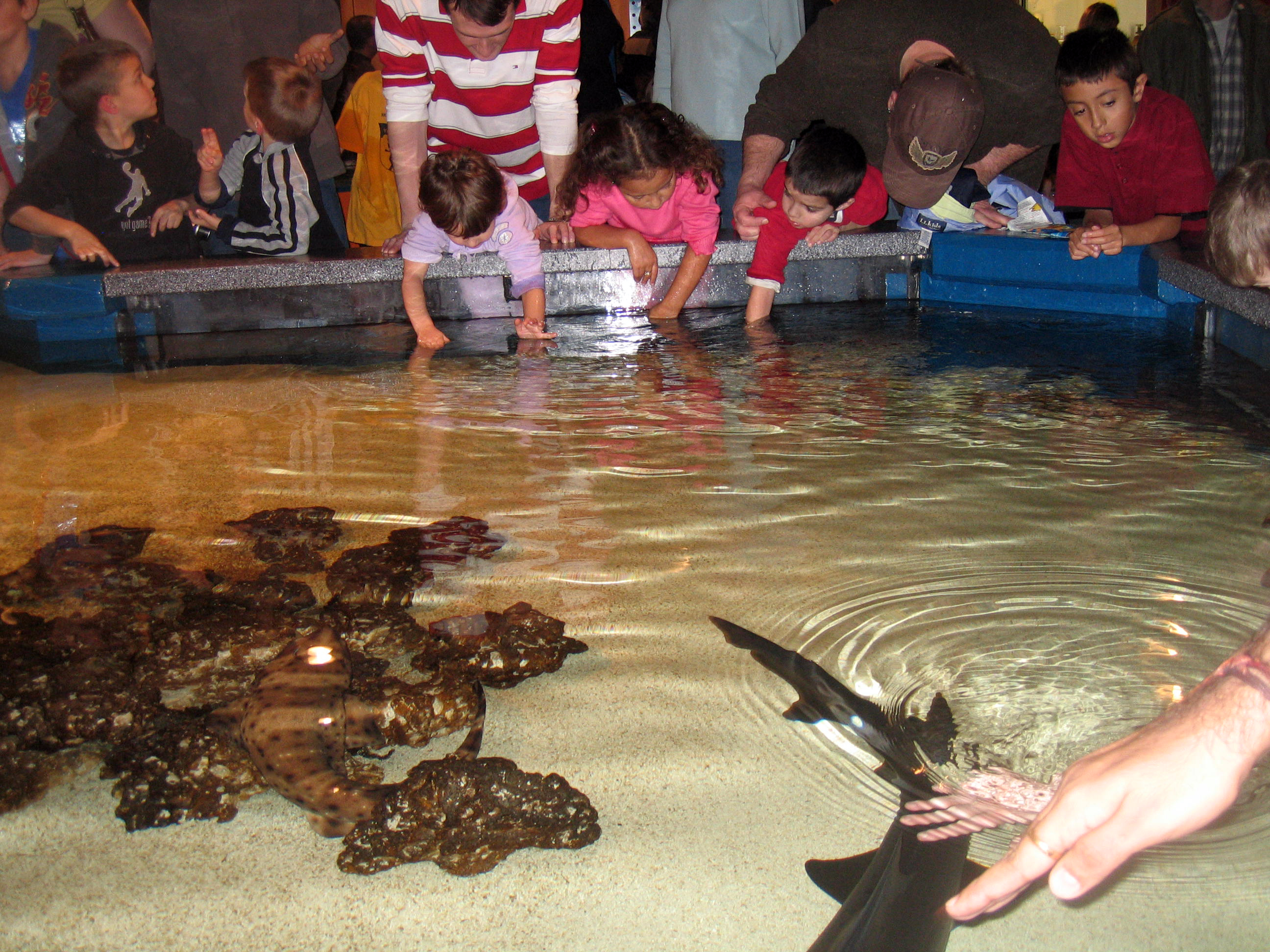
Touch pool

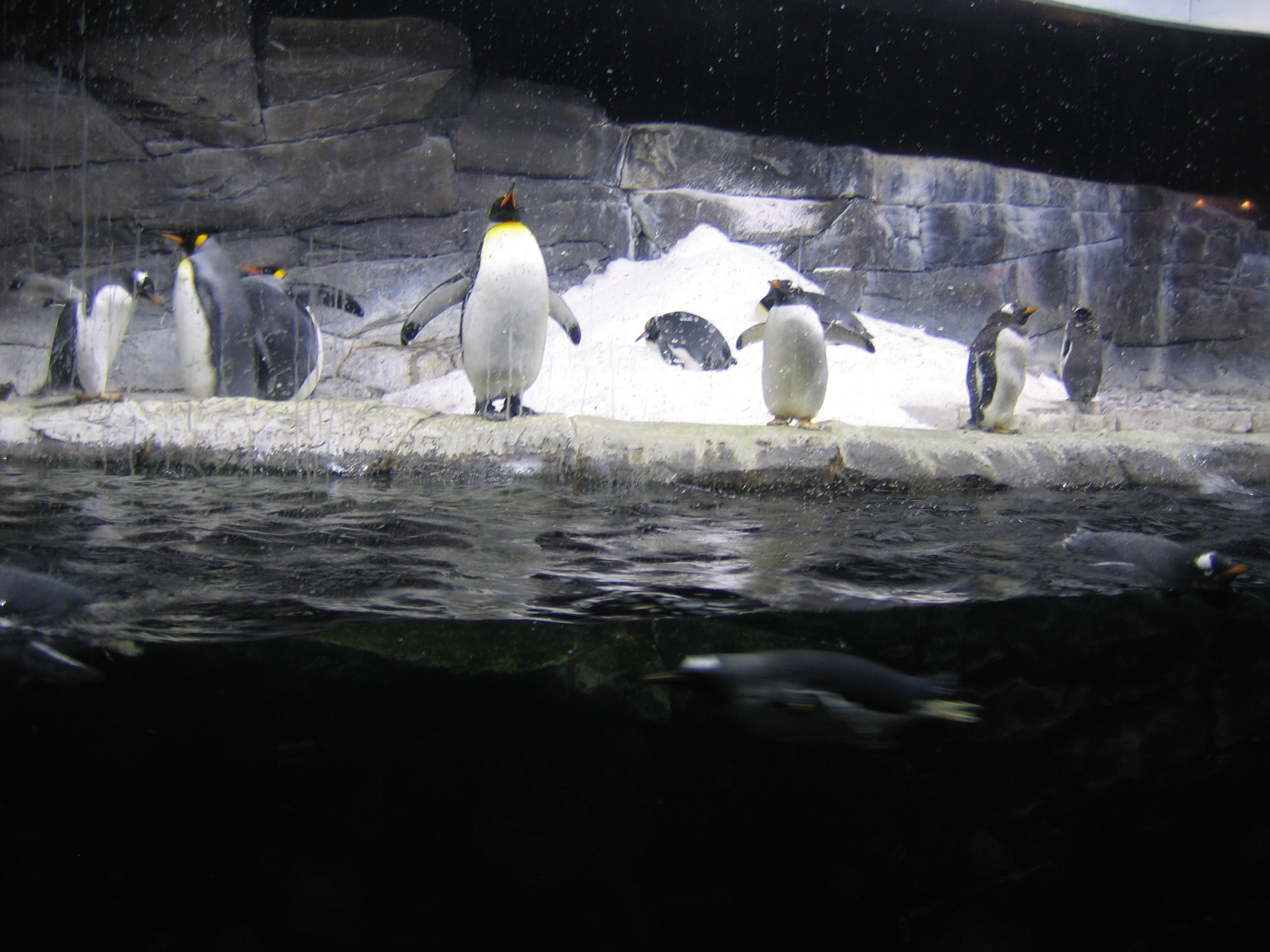
Penguins

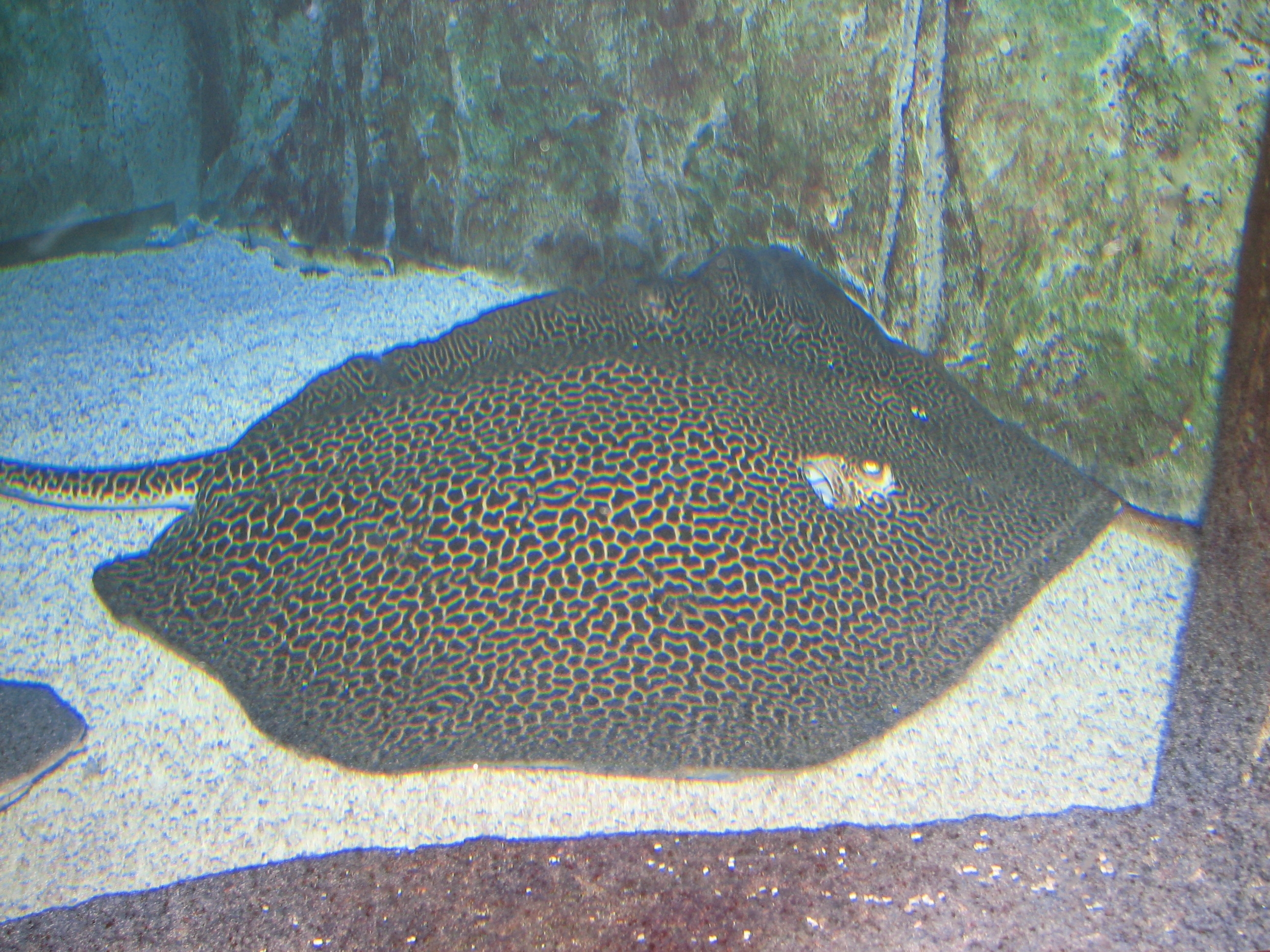
Honeycomb whiptail ray

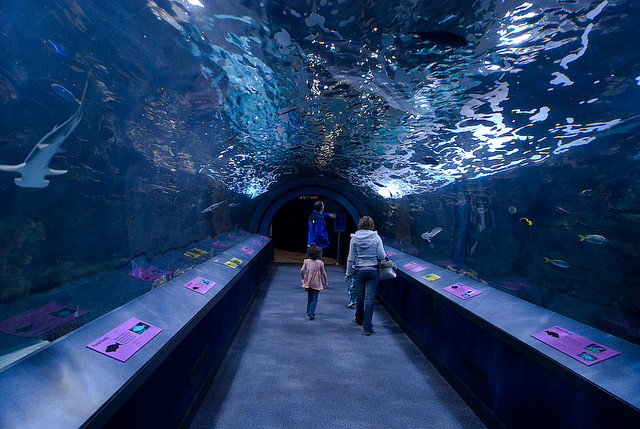
Underwater tunnel
