= Lambert Hehl =

American politician (1924–2019)

Lambert Hehl, Jr.

Member of the Kentucky Senate
- In office 1959–1963

Personal details
- Born: July 22, 1924 Newport, Kentucky, United States
- Died: September 23, 2019 (aged 95) Edgewood, Kentucky, U.S.
- Party: Democratic

Lambert Lawrence Hehl Jr. (July 22, 1924 - September 23, 2019) was an American politician in the state of Kentucky. He served in the Kentucky Senate as a Democrat from 1959 to 1963. He is also a former judge-executive of Campbell County, Kentucky.
