= Interstate 471 =

Highway in the United States

Interstate 471
- I-471 highlighted in red

Route information
- Auxiliary route of I-71
- Maintained by Kentucky Transportation Cabinet and ODOT
- Length: 5.75 mi (9.25 km)
- Existed: 1981–present
- NHS: Entire route

Major junctions
- South end: US 27 in Highland Heights, KY
- I-275 in Highland Heights; US 27 in Southgate, KY; US 50 in Cincinnati, OH
- North end: I-71 in Cincinnati

Location
- Country: United States
- States: Kentucky, Ohio
- Counties: KY: Campbell; OH: Hamilton

Highway system
- Interstate Highway System; Main; Auxiliary; Suffixed; Business; Future
← KY 470	KY	→ KY 472
← I-470	OH	→ I-475

Interstate 471 (I-471) is a 5.75-mile-long (9.25 km) Interstate Highway, linking I-71 in Downtown Cincinnati, Ohio, to I-275 in Highland Heights, Kentucky. South of I-275, the expressway continues south to U.S. Route 27 (US 27) as unsigned Kentucky Route 471 (KY 471).

== Route description ==
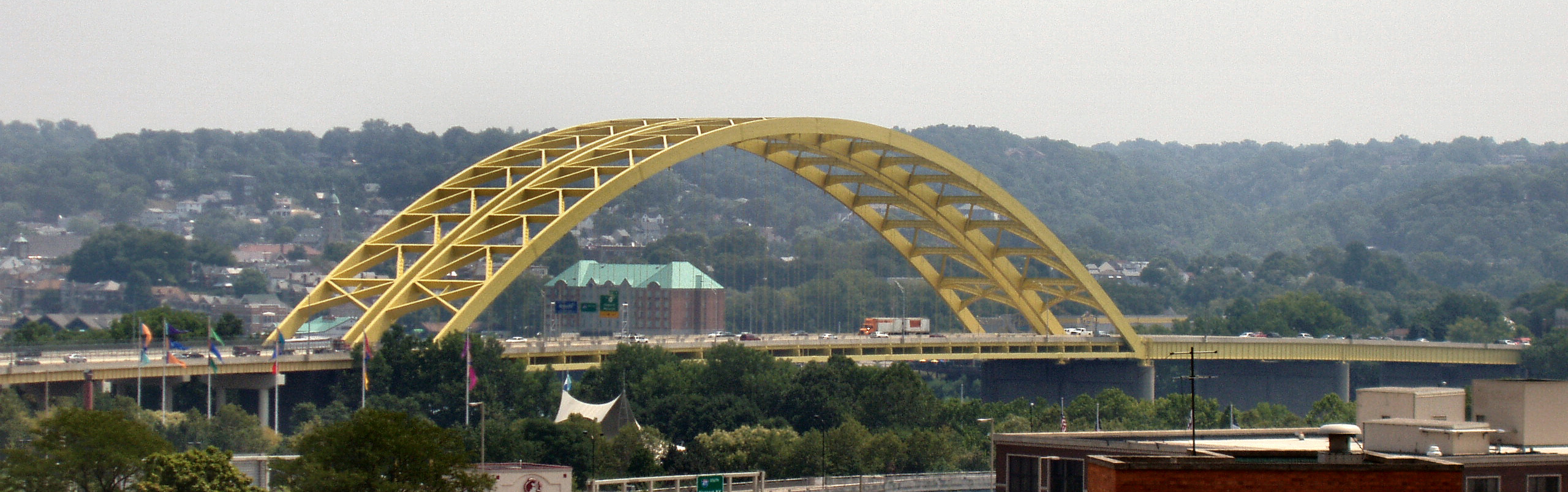
Daniel Carter Beard Bridge

The southern terminus of I-471 is at an interchange with I–275 and US 27. I-471 heads northwest, then turns northeast, having an interchange with US 27 in Southgate. After US 27, I-471 turns back northwest, heading toward Cincinnati. On the way to Cincinnati, I-471 passes through the east side of Newport. On the east side of Newport, I-471 has an interchange with KY 8. I-471 crosses the Ohio River using the Daniel Carter Beard Bridge, a Cincinnati landmark. After the Ohio River crossing, I-471 has an interchange with US 50. After the interchange with US 50, I-471 has an interchange with I-71 northeast of Downtown Cincinnati. The northern terminus of I-471 is at the interchange with I-71.

== History ==
I-471 was first envisioned in 1961 as an east–west connector between I-71/I-75 in Covington, Kentucky, with I-71 in Cincinnati, Ohio, crossing the Ohio River at a spot close to the current location. In effect, this connection would have provided for an alternative to I-71, creating an inner loop system that would span both Ohio and Kentucky. Since this freeway would have hugged the southern riverfront, I-471 would have prevented access to the Ohio River from Kentucky.

By 1967, the freeway was planned for a new alignment, much like the one seen today, connecting Cincinnati, Ohio, with Newport, Kentucky. On December 10, 1967, plans called for a north–south, 4.8-mile (7.7 km) freeway that would connect I-71 with I-275 near the interchange with US 27. I-471 would have three lanes in each direction (which has since been reworked into four lanes in each direction due to a construction project).

The bridge between Newport and Cincinnati was constructed between November 1971 and September 1976 and named after Covington native Daniel Carter Beard, the founder of the Boy Scouts of America. It developed the nickname of the "Big Mac Bridge" because its massive yellow arches over the river resemble the golden arches of McDonald's restaurants. The Daniel Carter Beard Bridge was fully dedicated in 1981.

Subsequent construction extended the freeway south from the bridge in phases, with the last segment of I-471 opening in 1980 at its junction with US 27 south of I-275. In 1981, the cost to construct the freeway and bridge was calculated to be $85 million (equivalent to $241 million in 2023).

Kentucky Route 471 was originally assigned to the road from US 25W in Jellico to US 25W in Saxton. This was renumbered to KY 1804 in 1961 when I-471 was designated.

== Exit list ==
State	County	Location	mi	km	Exit	Destinations	Notes
Kentucky	Campbell	Highland Heights				US 27 (Alexandria Pike) / Sunset Drive – Alexandria, Northern Kentucky University	At-grade intersection; southern terminus of unsigned KY 471; KYTC signs this as southern terminus of I-471; highway continues as US 27 south (Alexandria Pk.)
Kentucky	Campbell	Highland Heights	0.000	0.000	1	I-275 to I-71 / I-75 – Columbus OH, Airport	Stack interchange; left exits north-to-west, south-to-east; left entrances east-to-north, west-to-south; southern terminus of I-471 and northern terminus of unsigned KY 471; signed as exits 1A (east) and 1B (west); I-275 exits 74A-B
Kentucky	Campbell	Southgate	1.745	2.808	2	US 27 (Alexandria Pike) – Southgate, Ft. Thomas	
Kentucky	Campbell	Newport	3.202	5.153	3	KY 1892 (North Grand Avenue) – Newport, Ft. Thomas	
Kentucky	Campbell	Newport	3.858	6.209	4	KY 1120 (East 10th Street, Memorial Parkway) – Newport, Bellevue	
Kentucky	Campbell	Newport	4.649	7.482	5	KY 8 (Fairfield Avenue) / Park Avenue – Newport, Bellevue	
Ohio River			5.016	8.072	Daniel Carter Beard Bridge		
Ohio	Hamilton	Cincinnati	5.3	8.5	6A	US 50 (Columbia Parkway) to 3rd Street south / I-71 / I-75	Northbound exit and southbound entrance
Ohio	Hamilton	Cincinnati	5.4	8.7	6B	6th Street – Downtown	Northbound exit only
Ohio	Hamilton	Cincinnati	5.6	9.0	7	US 42 (Reading Road) / Liberty Street	Northbound exit and southbound entrance
Ohio	Hamilton	Cincinnati	5.75	9.25		I-71 north – Columbus	Northern terminus; no access to I-71 south; I-71 exit 1D
1.000 mi = 1.609 km; 1.000 km = 0.621 mi: Incomplete access; Route transition
