= Newport, Kentucky =

- City
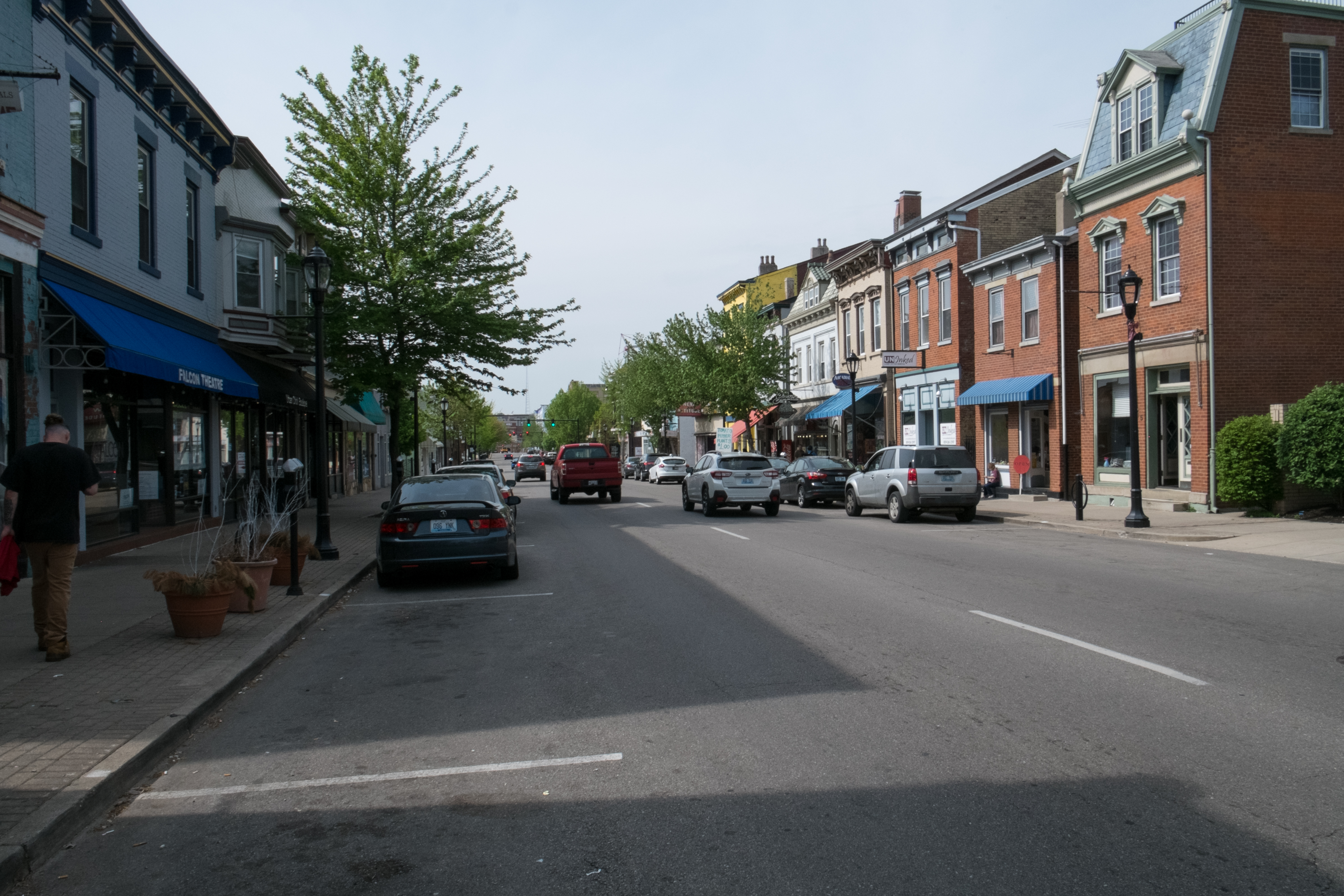
- Monmouth Street Historic District
- Interactive map of Newport, Kentucky
- Location within Kentucky Location within the United States
- Coordinates: 39°5′19″N 84°29′25″W
- Country: United States
- State: Kentucky
- County: Campbell
- Established: 1795
- Named for: Christopher Newport

Government
  - Type: Commission-City Manager
  - Mayor: Tom Guidugli, Jr

Area
  - Total: 3.01 sq mi (7.80 km^{2})
  - Land: 2.76 sq mi (7.14 km^{2})
  - Water: 0.25 sq mi (0.66 km^{2})
- Elevation: 528 ft (161 m)

Population (2020)
  - Total: 14,150
  - Estimate (2022): 13,901
  - Density: 5,135.9/sq mi (1,982.99/km^{2})
- Time zone: UTC-5 (Eastern (EST))
  - Summer (DST): UTC-4 (EDT)
- ZIP code: 41071-41072
- Area code: 859
- FIPS code: 21-55884
- GNIS feature ID: 2404373
- Website: www.newportky.gov

Newport is a home rule-class city in Campbell County, Kentucky, United States. It is at the confluence of the Ohio and Licking rivers across from Cincinnati. The population was 14,150 at the 2020 census. Historically, it was one of four county seats of Campbell County. Newport is an urban center of Northern Kentucky and is part of the Cincinnati metropolitan area.

== History ==
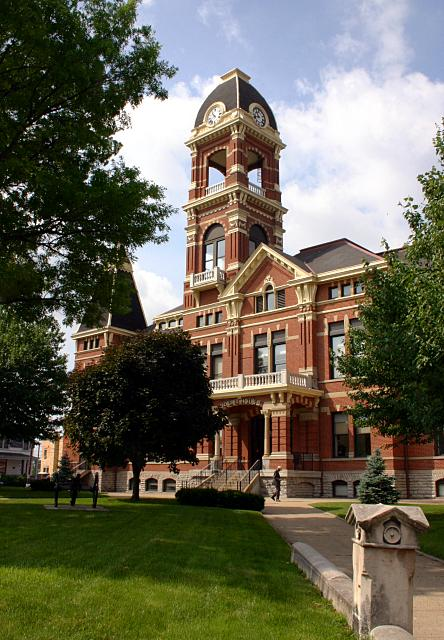
The Campbell County Courthouse in Newport, Kentucky

Newport was settled c. 1791 by James Taylor Jr. on land purchased by his father James Sr. from George Muse, who received it as a grant. Taylor's brother, Hubbard Taylor, had been mapping the land twenty years prior. It was not named for its position on the river but for Christopher Newport, the commander of the first ship to reach Jamestown, Virginia, in 1607. Newport was established as a town on December 14, 1795, and incorporated as a city on February 24, 1834. In 1803, the Ft. Washington military post was moved from Cincinnati to become the Newport Barracks. A bridge first connected Newport to Covington in 1853, and the first bridge spanning the Ohio River to Cincinnati, the John A. Roebling Suspension Bridge, opened in 1866. Newport experienced large German immigration in the 1880-90s.

By 1900, Newport was the third largest city in Kentucky, after Covington and Louisville, although Newport and Covington were rightly considered satellites of Cincinnati.

Prohibition under the Volstead Act of 1919 resulted in a widespread illegal sale of alcohol. Many gangsters began to smuggle alcohol into the city to supply citizens and businesses. Speakeasies, bribery, and corruption became a norm in Newport. A well known Newport crime boss was gambler and National Crime Syndicate member Ed Levinson.

In 1921, Newport was rocked by a steel mill strike of +2,000 workers, following the end of WW1 and steel industry downturn. The strike involved one in five of the town's workers and was over recognition for the three unskilled union locals that made up the four locals within the union. During it, following unrest and the company arming the mill with machine guns, state militia companies and later tanks were stationed in the town, withdrawn in late 1922. The strike was partially broken by the end of 1922 with some steelworkers leaving the town and others finding separate jobs in Newport. However, the strike did not formally end until seven years later in 1928, without union recognition for the three locals.

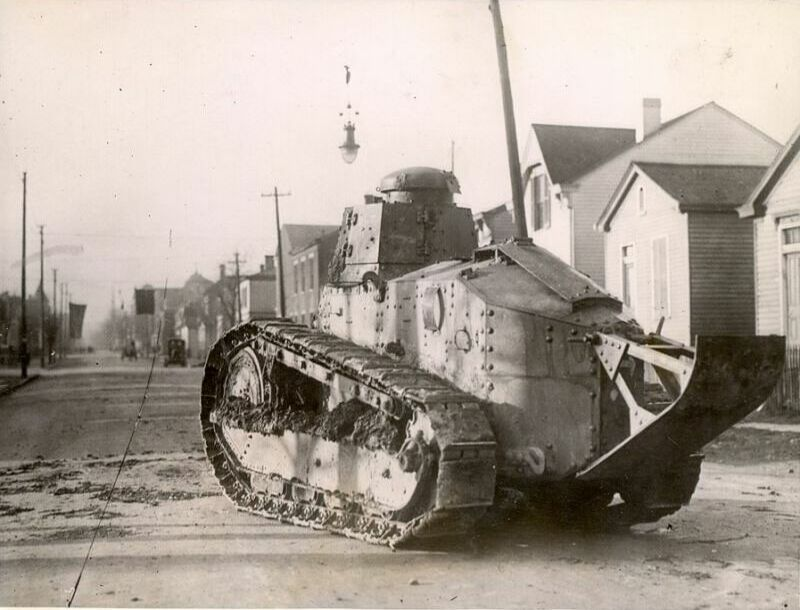
Militia tank in Newport on Brighton St. during steel strike, 1922

Newport's worst natural disaster occurred in 1937, when a flood covered a great part of the city. A flood wall was completed in 1948, and remains a significant part of Newport's landscape.

Newport once had the reputation of "Sin City" due to its upscale gambling casinos on Monmouth street. Monmouth also had many men's stores, restaurants, and ice cream parlors. Investigations for racketeering pushed out the casinos, which were replaced by peep shows and adult strip clubs. Many of the old businesses disappeared when parking became difficult on Monmouth Street and the commercial district opened on the hill of south Newport.

A garage at 938 John Street manufacturing illegal fireworks exploded without warning in 1981, leaving severe damage up to a six-block radius.

In the 1980s and 1990s, Newport made plans to develop its riverfront and core to focus primarily on "family friendly" tourism, instead of the "Sin City" tourism of the past. In May 1999 the $40-million Newport Aquarium opened, and the historic Posey Flats apartments were leveled in favor of the Newport on the Levee entertainment complex, which opened the following year.

In 1997 plans for a 1,015-foot (309 m) structure called the "Millennium Tower" were revealed. The tower's main selling point was that building it would be financed by private money, as opposed to taxpayer money. The tower was expected to be completed by 2003, but investors later pulled out and no construction was done. Today the site for the tower is a parking lot next to the World Peace Bell.

In the 21st century, Newport has experienced development with the entertainment industry.

=== Timeline ===
Timeline of Newport, Kentucky
- 1791 - Settlement laid out.
- 1795 - Town of Newport incorporated.
- 1796 - Campbell County Courthouse built.
- 1798 - Newport Academy founded.
- 1800 - Population: 106.
- 1804 - Newport Barracks established.
- 1812 - James Taylor mansion built.
- 1821 - Southgate house built (approximate date).
- 1831 - Taylor Methodist Episcopal Church built.
- 1834 - City of Newport chartered.
- 1836 - Newport Lyceum founded.
- 1844 - Silk factory begins operating.
- 1847 - Public school begins operating.
- 1850 - Washington Fire Engine and Hose Company (volunteer firefighters) established.
- 1859 - October 28: "Mob destroys the plant of the True South, abolition paper."
- 1860
  - Public high school begins operating.
  - Population: 10,046.
- 1866 - John A. Roebling Suspension Bridge opens near Newport.
- 1869 - John Butcher Brewery (later Wiedemann) in business.
- 1870 - Population: 15,087.
- 1871 - St. Paul's Episcopal Church built.
- 1872 - Newport and Cincinnati Bridge opens.
- 1873 - Southgate St. School established.
- 1880 - Population: 20,433.
- 1883 - Ohio River flood.
- 1884
  - Ohio River flood.
  - Campbell County Courthouse rebuilt.
- 1888 - U.S. military Fort Thomas established near Newport.
- 1890 - Cincinnati–Newport Bridge opens.
- 1891
  - Andrews Steel Mill in business.
  - George Ahlering elected mayor.
- 1898 - Ohio River flood.
- 1900 - Population: 28,301.
- 1902 - Carnegie Free Library opens.
- 1910 - Population: 30,309.
- 1913 - Ohio River flood.
- 1921 - Newport Steel worker labor strike begins.
- 1924 - Cote Brilliante becomes part of Newport.
- 1927 - Newport Finance Building constructed.
- 1928 - Newport steel strike officially ends, after 7 years.
- 1930 - City-manager form of government adopted.
- 1935 - Clifton becomes part of Newport.
- 1936 - Ingalls Park becomes part of Newport.
- 1937 - Flood.
- 1948 - Floodwall built.
- 1955 - The all-boys Newport Catholic High School opens a new campus on Carothers Road. The facility remains in use today by its coeducational successor, Newport Central Catholic High School.
- 1956 - Newport Shopping Center in business.
- 1961
  - Anti-corruption "Committee of 500" formed.
  - George Ratterman becomes county sheriff.
- 1973 - Regional Transit Authority of Northern Kentucky (public transit) established.
- 1975 - Newport News begins publication.
- 1976 - Daniel Carter Beard Bridge opens.
- 1978 - Campbell County Public Library established.
- 1980
  - Irene Deaton becomes first female mayor of Newport.
  - Mansion Hill designated an historic district.
- 1983
  - Steve Goetz elected mayor.
  - Newport Central Catholic High School is created by the merger of the all-boys Newport Catholic High School and all-girls Our Lady of Providence Academy.
- 1990 - Campbell County Historical Society founded.
- 1992 - Tom Guidugli becomes mayor.
- 1995 - Taylor–Southgate Bridge opens.
- 1999 - Newport Aquarium opens.
- 2000 - Population: 17,048.
- 2001 - Newport on the Levee "entertainment complex" in business.
- 2004 - L&N Bridge pedestrianized.
- 2005 - Geoff Davis becomes U.S. representative for Kentucky's 4th congressional district.
- 2008 - Jerry Peluso elected mayor.
- 2010 - Population: 15,273.
- 2012 - Thomas Massie becomes U.S. representative for Kentucky's 4th congressional district.
- 2021 - Thomas Guidugli, Jr elected mayor

=== County seat ===
Newport is a county seat of Campbell County, and was previously a county seat from 1797 until 1823, and again from 1824 until 1840. In the 19th century, the overwhelming majority of the population lived in Newport and the surrounding cities. Many citizens did not like traveling south to Alexandria to conduct county business, as southern Campbell County was primarily undeveloped.

In 1883, Newport successfully lobbied the state legislature for an exception to state law, which both required that a county seat be located in the center of the county, and that certain county business only be conducted at the county seat. Frankfort passed a special law, creating the Newport Court House District, and within that district, the Newport Courthouse Commission which functioned as a special taxing district, so that an additional courthouse could be built, and business could take place in Newport, in addition to Alexandria. In 2008, the Kentucky General Assembly removed the taxing authority from the Courthouse Commission, but left the District and Commission intact.

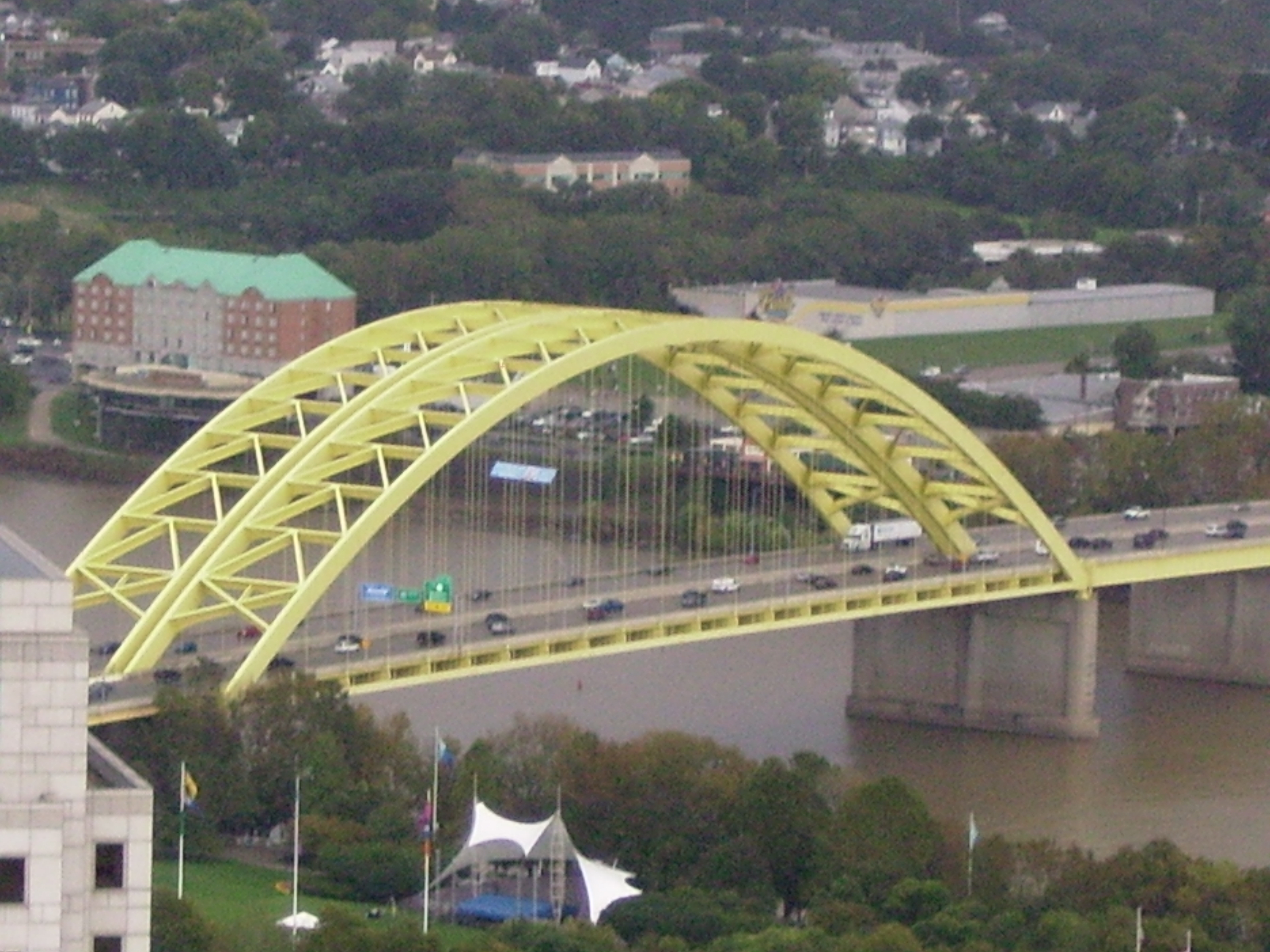
The Daniel Carter Beard Bridge is more commonly called the "Big Mac" bridge because of its resemblance to McDonald's iconic arches.

In 2009, a court ruled that Alexandria is the only county seat, and Newport is not a county seat. On November 24, 2010, the Kentucky Court of Appeals disagreed, and granted Newport equal status as a county seat. On August 25, 2011, the Supreme Court of Kentucky denied review of the appellate decision.

== Geography ==
According to the United States Census Bureau, the city has a total area of 3.0 square miles (7.8 km^{2}), of which 2.7 square miles (7.0 km^{2}) is land and 0.2 square miles (0.52 km^{2}) (8.42%) is water.

Newport is located within the Bluegrass region found in the Upland South of the United States of America. Newport is also commonly referred to as being located in the Midwest. Either description of Upland South or Midwest is acceptable, as Newport is located at the boundary between those regions.

=== Climate ===
Newport is located within a transition zone and is proximal to the extreme northern limit of the humid subtropical climate of the Southeastern United States.

== Demographics ==
Historical population
Census	Pop.	Note	%±
1800	106		—
1810	413		289.6%
1830	715		—
1850	5,895		—
1860	10,046		70.4%
1870	15,087		50.2%
1880	20,433		35.4%
1890	24,918		21.9%
1900	28,301		13.6%
1910	30,309		7.1%
1920	29,317		−3.3%
1930	29,744		1.5%
1940	30,631		3.0%
1950	31,044		1.3%
1960	30,070		−3.1%
1970	25,998		−13.5%
1980	21,587		−17.0%
1990	18,871		−12.6%
2000	17,048		−9.7%
2010	15,273		−10.4%
2020	14,150		−7.4%
2024 (est.)	13,792		−2.5%
U.S. Decennial Census

=== 2020 census ===
As of the 2020 census, Newport had a population of 14,150. The median age was 36.6 years. 17.9% of residents were under the age of 18 and 13.2% of residents were 65 years of age or older. For every 100 females there were 105.4 males, and for every 100 females age 18 and over there were 106.5 males age 18 and over.

100.0% of residents lived in urban areas, while 0.0% lived in rural areas.

There were 6,445 households in Newport, of which 19.7% had children under the age of 18 living in them. Of all households, 26.8% were married-couple households, 29.0% were households with a male householder and no spouse or partner present, and 33.8% were households with a female householder and no spouse or partner present. About 43.0% of all households were made up of individuals and 11.8% had someone living alone who was 65 years of age or older. The average household size was 1.98, and the average family size was 2.82.

There were 7,361 housing units, of which 12.4% were vacant. The homeowner vacancy rate was 2.2% and the rental vacancy rate was 7.9%. The population density was 5,136.12 people per square mile (1,982.99/km^{2}).

Racial composition as of the 2020 census
Race	Number	Percent
White	11,273	79.7%
Black or African American	1,286	9.1%
American Indian and Alaska Native	51	0.4%
Asian	136	1.0%
Native Hawaiian and Other Pacific Islander	10	0.1%
Some other race	379	2.7%
Two or more races	1,015	7.2%
Hispanic or Latino (of any race)	810	5.7%

=== 2016-2020 American Community Survey ===
According to the U.S. Census American Community Survey, for the period 2016-2020 the estimated median annual income for a household in the city was $44,095, and the median income for a family was $89,115. About 23.2% of the population were living below the poverty line, including 33.8% of those under age 18 and 34.4% of those age 65 or over. About 54.0% of the population were employed, and 35.6% had a bachelor's degree or higher.

=== 2010 census ===
As of the census of 2010, there were 15,273 people, 6,194 households, and 3,273 families residing in the city. The population density was 6,267.8 inhabitants per square mile (2,420.0/km^{2}). There were 7,828 housing units at an average density of 2,878.0 per square mile (1,111.2/km^{2}). The racial makeup of the city was 86.3% White, 7.6% African American, 0.3% Native American, 0.7% Asian, less than 0.01% Pacific Islander, 1.8% from other races, and 3.2% from two or more races. Hispanic or Latino of any race were 4.1% of the population.

There were 6,194 households, out of which 23.3% had children under the age of 18 living with them, 28.7% were married couples living together, 17.3% had a female householder with no husband present, and 47.2% were non-families. 37.0% of all households were made up of individuals, and 8.9% had someone living alone who was 65 years of age or older. The average household size was 2.32 and the average family size was 3.09.

In the city the population was spread out, with 22.2% under the age of 18, 11.1% from 18 to 24, 31.2% from 25 to 44, 25.1% from 45 to 64, and 10.4% who were 65 years of age or older. The median age was 34 years. For every 100 females, there were 94.8 males. For every 100 females age 18 and over, there were 91.4 males.

The median income for a household in the city was $27,451, and the median income for a family was $32,858. Males had a median income of $29,337 versus $22,723 for females. The per capita income for the city was $15,207. About 20.7% of families and 22.3% of the population were below the poverty line, including 31.1% of those under age 18 and 16.3% of those age 65 or over.

== Economy ==
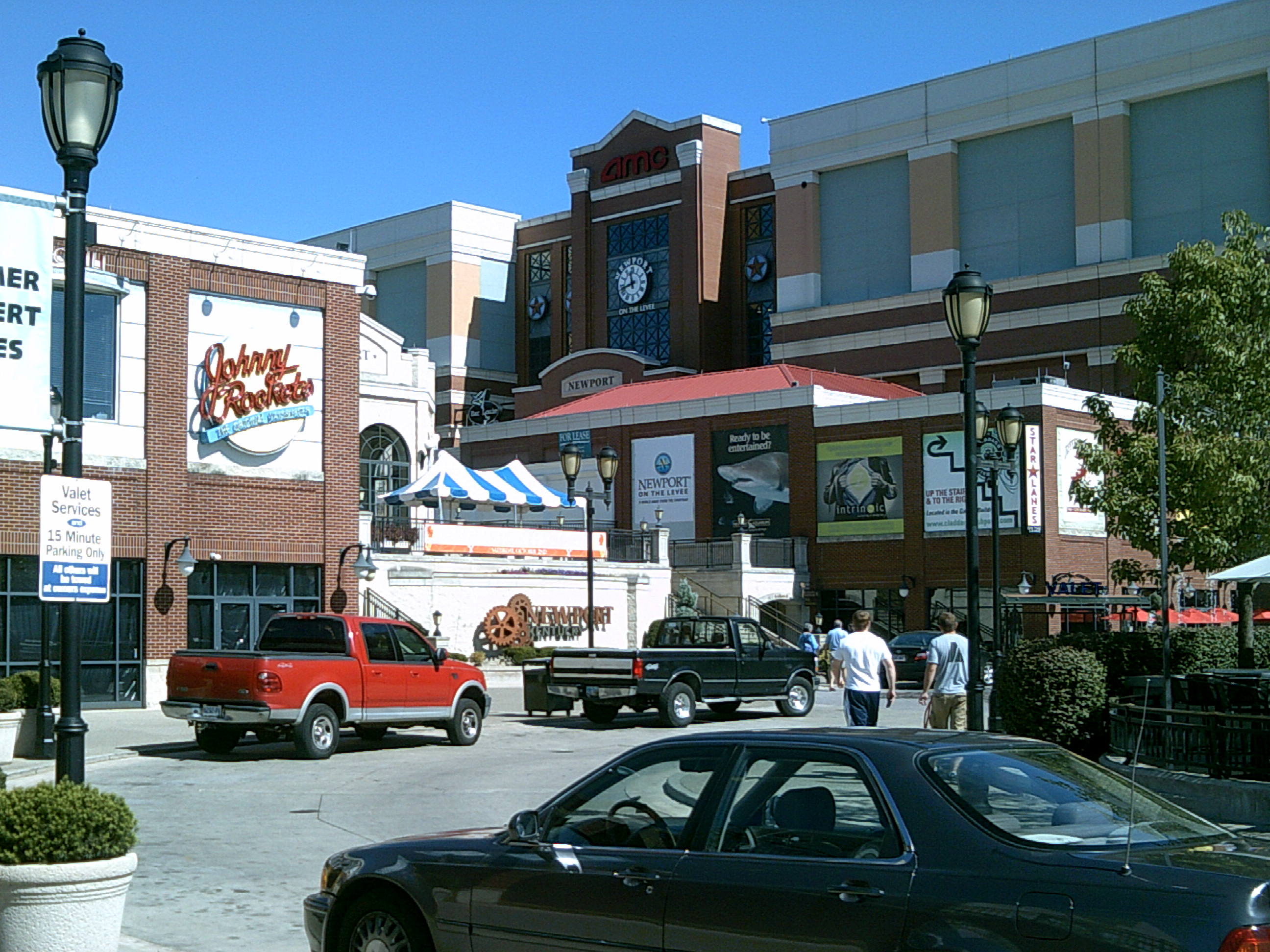
Newport on the Levee

Newport is home to Newport on the Levee, a dining and entertainment complex located on Third Street, which includes Newport Aquarium.

== Education ==
Newport Public Schools are part of the Newport Independent Schools School District. The district has one elementary school, one intermediate school, one middle school, and one high school. Newport is also home to a Catholic private high school; Newport Central Catholic is a coed private Catholic school in central Newport which has been operating for over 100 years.

Newport has a public library, a branch of the Campbell County Public Library.

== Media ==
A pivotal scene (in which the autistic character Raymond Babbitt counts the toothpicks) in the 1988 film Rain Man was filmed in Newport at Pompilio's Italian restaurant. Scenes from the Netflix original movie Extremely Wicked, Shockingly Evil and Vile (2019) were filmed in Newport. The scenes from Extremely Wicked, Shockingly Evil and Vile (2019) showcase parts of Monmouth Street, Pepper Pod, and Newport's historic court house. A scene from the 2011 political thriller The Ides of March was shot in Newport. The scene (in which Molly Stearns overdoses) was shot at the Comfort Inn located at 420 Riverboat Row facing downtown Cincinnati across the Daniel Carter Beard Bridge in Kentucky.

The Cincinnati area's Fox affiliate, WXIX-TV (channel 19) is allocated and licensed to Newport, though its actual operations and transmitter has always been across the river in Hamilton County, Ohio.

== Notable people ==
- John Alexander, actor known for his portrayal of Teddy Brewster in Arsenic and Old Lace
- Dave Cowens, NBA center, member of the Basketball Hall of Fame
- Charles J. Helm, Kentucky politician, U.S. Consul General to Cuba, diplomat of the Confederate States
- Taylen Kinney, basketball player for Overtime Elite, social media personality
- Brent Spence, Democratic Congressman, attorney, and banker from Northern Kentucky and namesake of the Brent Spence Bridge
- Mary Florence Taney, socialite, writer, and clubwoman

== See also ==
- List of cities and towns along the Ohio River
- Newport Central Catholic High School

== Bibliography ==
- "Newport City Guide". Cincinnati Directory. Cincinnati, Ohio: C.S. Williams. 1860 – via Google Books.
- "Newport Directory". Cincinnati Directory. Cincinnati, Ohio: C.S. Williams. 1861 – via Internet Archive.
- "Newport", Kentucky State Gazetteer and Business Directory, Detroit: R. L. Polk & Co., 1881
  - 1883 ed.
- "City of Newport". Atlas of Boone, Kenton and Campbell Counties, Kentucky. Philadelphia: D.J. Lake & Co. 1883 – via Google Books.
- "Newport (Kentucky)" . Encyclopædia Britannica. Vol. 19 (11th ed.). 1911. p. 534.
- Federal Writers' Project (1939a), "Newport", Kentucky, American Guide Series, New York: Harcourt, Brace and Company, pp. 246–249, OCLC 498232 – via Internet Archive
- Federal Writers' Project (1939b), "Chronology", Kentucky, American Guide Series, New York: Harcourt, Brace and Company, pp. 451–461, OCLC 498232 – via Internet Archive
- Isabel Wilkerson (April 16, 1990), "When Looking for Sin, Cincinnati Looks South", New York Times
- John E. Kleber, ed. (1992). "Newport". Kentucky Encyclopedia. University Press of Kentucky. pp. 680+. ISBN 0-8131-2883-8.
- T. Purvis, ed. (1996). Newport, Kentucky: a Bicentennial History.
- Robert Yoder (2005). Newport in Vintage Postcards. Arcadia. ISBN 978-0-7385-1812-1.
- Robin Caraway (2009). Newport: The Sin City Years. Images of America. Arcadia. ISBN 978-0-7385-6857-7.
- Michael Whitehead (2009). "Newport". In Paul A. Tenkotte; James C. Claypool (eds.). Encyclopedia of Northern Kentucky. University Press of Kentucky. pp. 651+. ISBN 978-0-8131-5996-6.
