= Cincinnati metropolitan area =

Coordinates: 39°0′N 84°30′W

Metro Cincinnati Cincinnati, OH–KY–IN Metropolitan Statistical Area
- Metropolitan Statistical Area
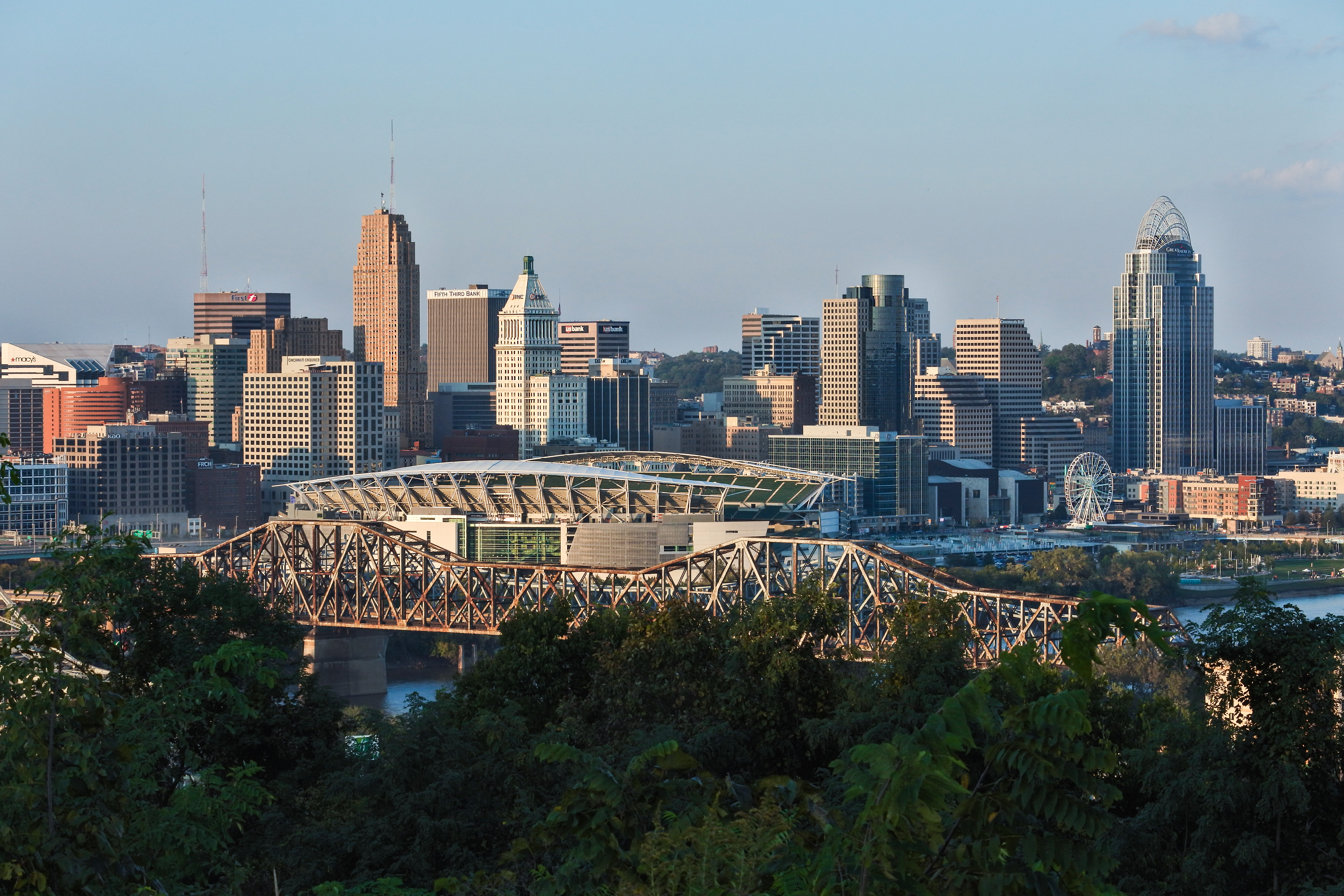
- Downtown Cincinnati along the Ohio River, viewed from Devou Park in Covington, Kentucky
Map of Cincinnati–Wilmington, OH–KY–IN CSA
City of Cincinnati
Cincinnati, OH–KY–IN MSA
Wilmington, OH μSA
- Country: United States
- State: Ohio; Kentucky; Indiana
- Largest city: Cincinnati
- Counties: List: In MSA: Hamilton County; Butler County; Warren County; Clinton County; Clermont County; Brown County; Kenton County; Campbell County; Boone County; Bracken County; Gallatin County; Grant County; Pendleton County; Dearborn County; Franklin County; Ohio County
- Named for: Cincinnatus

Area
  - Total: 4,808 sq mi (12,450 km^{2})
- Elevation: 551 ft (168 m)

Population (2015)
  - Metro density: 470/sq mi (181/km^{2})
  - MSA: 2,256,884 (28th)
- MSA/CSA = 2015, Urban = 2013

GDP
  - Total: $198.889 billion (2023)
- Time zone: UTC−5 (EST)
  - Summer (DST): UTC−4 (EDT)
- Area codes: 513, 283, 859, 937, 812

The Cincinnati metropolitan area (also known as the Cincinnati Tri-State area or Greater Cincinnati) is a metropolitan area with its core in Ohio and Kentucky. Its largest city is Cincinnati and includes surrounding counties in the U.S. states of Ohio, Kentucky, and Indiana.

The United States Census Bureau's formal name for the area is the Cincinnati, OH–KY–IN Metropolitan Statistical Area. As of the 2020 U.S. census, the metro area had a population of 2,256,884, making Greater Cincinnati the 30th-most populous metropolitan area in the United States, and the largest metro area in Ohio, followed by Columbus and Cleveland. The Cincinnati–Wilmington, OH–KY–IN Combined Statistical Area, adds Clinton County, Ohio (defined as the Wilmington, OH micropolitan area) and, until 2023, Mason County, Kentucky (defined as the Maysville, KY micropolitan area), was part of the CSA. The Cincinnati metropolitan area is considered part of the Great Lakes megalopolis.

== Census designation history ==
The Cincinnati metropolitan area was originally designated by the United States Census Bureau in 1950 and consisted of the Kentucky counties of Campbell and Kenton and the Ohio county of Hamilton. As surrounding counties saw an increase in their population densities and the number of their residents employed within Hamilton County, they met census criteria to be added to the MSA. The Hamilton–Middletown, OH MSA was also formed in 1950 and consisted solely of Butler County, Ohio.

In 1990, the census changed designation of the areas known as MSAs to Primary Metropolitan Statistical Area (PMSA), and a new Consolidated Metropolitan Statistical Area (CMSA) grouping was created. From 1990 through 2005, the Cincinnati–Hamilton–Middletown CMSA included the Cincinnati–Hamilton, OH–KY–IN PMSA and the Hamilton–Middletown, OH PMSA.

As of December 2005, census terminology changed again, eliminating the PMSA/CMSA terminology. Consolidated Statistical Areas (CSA) combine more than one Core Based Statistical Area (CBSA). Newly defined MSAs (Metropolitan) and μSAs (Micropolitan) Statistical Areas are CBSAs. From 2005 to 2013, the Cincinnati–Middletown–Wilmington CSA included the Cincinnati–Middletown MSA (defined as the old Cincinnati–Hamilton–Middletown CMSA), and Wilmington, OH μSA (Clinton County, Ohio).

In 2013, the CSA was redefined again. The Cincinnati–Middletown MSA was renamed the Cincinnati MSA. The Wilmington, OH μSA remained in the CSA. The Maysville, KY μSA, which had previously consisted of Mason and Lewis Counties in Kentucky, was redefined as consisting solely of Mason County and added to the CSA. The name of the CSA accordingly changed to the Cincinnati–Wilmington–Maysville CSA.

In September 2018, Union County, Indiana, was added to the Cincinnati MSA.

Historical population
Census	Pop.	Note	%±
1950	1,244,738		—
1960	1,544,659		24.1%
1970	1,690,234		9.4%
1980	1,753,801		3.8%
1990	1,844,917		5.2%
2000	2,009,632		8.9%
2010	2,130,151		6.0%
2020	2,256,884		5.9%
data source:

In July 2023, the new metropolitan area delineation were published and Union County, Indiana, was detached from the Cincinnati MSA, and the Maysville, Kentucky, micropolitan statistical area was detached from the combined statistical area.

Most of the region's population growth has occurred in the northern counties, leading to speculation that the Cincinnati–Northern Kentucky metropolitan area will eventually merge with Greater Dayton. Cincinnati is also located very close to other metropolitan areas, such as Columbus, Indianapolis, Lexington, and Louisville.

== Population ==
Statistical Area/County^{1}	2020 census	2010 census	2000 census	1990 census	1980 census	1970 census	1960 census	1950 census
Cincinnati–Wilmington–Maysville, OH-KY-IN CSA	2,316,022	2,172,191	2,050,175	1,880,332	1,788,404	1,721,698	1,574,663	1,270,310
Cincinnati, OH-KY-IN MSA	2,256,884	2,130,151	2,009,632	1,844,917	1,753,801	1,690,234	1,544,659	1,244,738
Hamilton County, Ohio	830,639	802,374	845,303	866,228	873,224	924,018	864,121	723,952
Butler County, Ohio^{2}	390,357	368,130	332,807	291,479	258,787	226,207	199,076	147,203
Warren County, Ohio	242,337	212,693	158,383	113,909	99,276	84,925	65,711	38,505
Clermont County, Ohio	208,601	197,363	177,977	150,187	128,483	95,725	80,530	42,182
Brown County, Ohio	43,676	44,846	42,285	34,966	31,920	26,635	25,178	22,221
Clinton County, Ohio	42,018							
Boone County, Kentucky	135,968	118,811	85,991	57,589	45,842	32,812	21,940	13,015
Kenton County, Kentucky	169,064	159,720	151,464	142,031	137,058	129,440	120,700	104,254
Campbell County, Kentucky	93,076	90,336	88,616	83,866	83,317	88,501	86,803	76,196
Grant County, Kentucky	24,941	24,662	22,384	15,737	13,308	9,999	9,489	9,809
Pendleton County, Kentucky	14,644	14,877	14,390	12,036	10,989	9,949	9,968	9,610
Bracken County, Kentucky	8,400	8,488	8,279	7,766	7,738	7,227	7,422	8,424
Gallatin County, Kentucky	8,690	8,589	7,870	5,393	4,842	4,134	3,867	3,969
Mason County, Kentucky	17,120							
Dearborn County, Indiana	50,679	50,047	46,109	38,835	34,291	29,430	28,674	25,141
Franklin County, Indiana	22,785	23,087	22,151	19,580	19,612	16,943	17,015	16,034
Ohio County, Indiana	5,940	6,128	5,623	5,315	5,114	4,289	4,165	4,223
Union County, Indiana	7,087							

Notes
^{1}For comparison purposes, population data is summarized using 2008 census CSA/MSA county definitions.
^{2}Butler County, Ohio was previously known as the Hamilton–Middletown, OH PMSA and was separate from the Cincinnati, OH–KY–IN PMSA until the 1990 census, when the Cincinnati–Hamilton, OH–KY–IN CMSA designation was used to consolidate the two PMSAs. The CMSA/PMSA designation is no longer used by the US census.

== Main cities ==
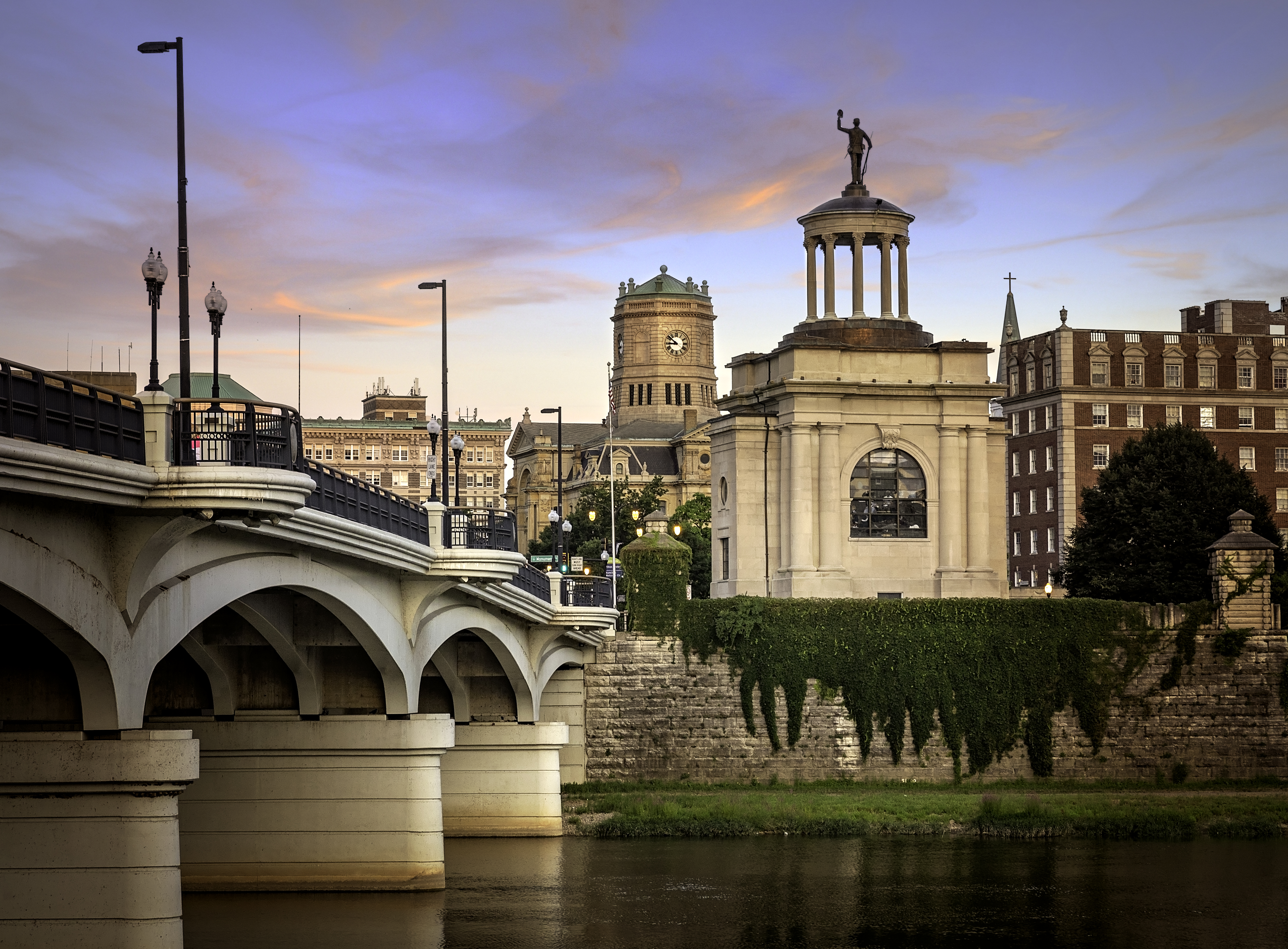
Hamilton, Ohio is the second-largest city in the Greater Cincinnati area.

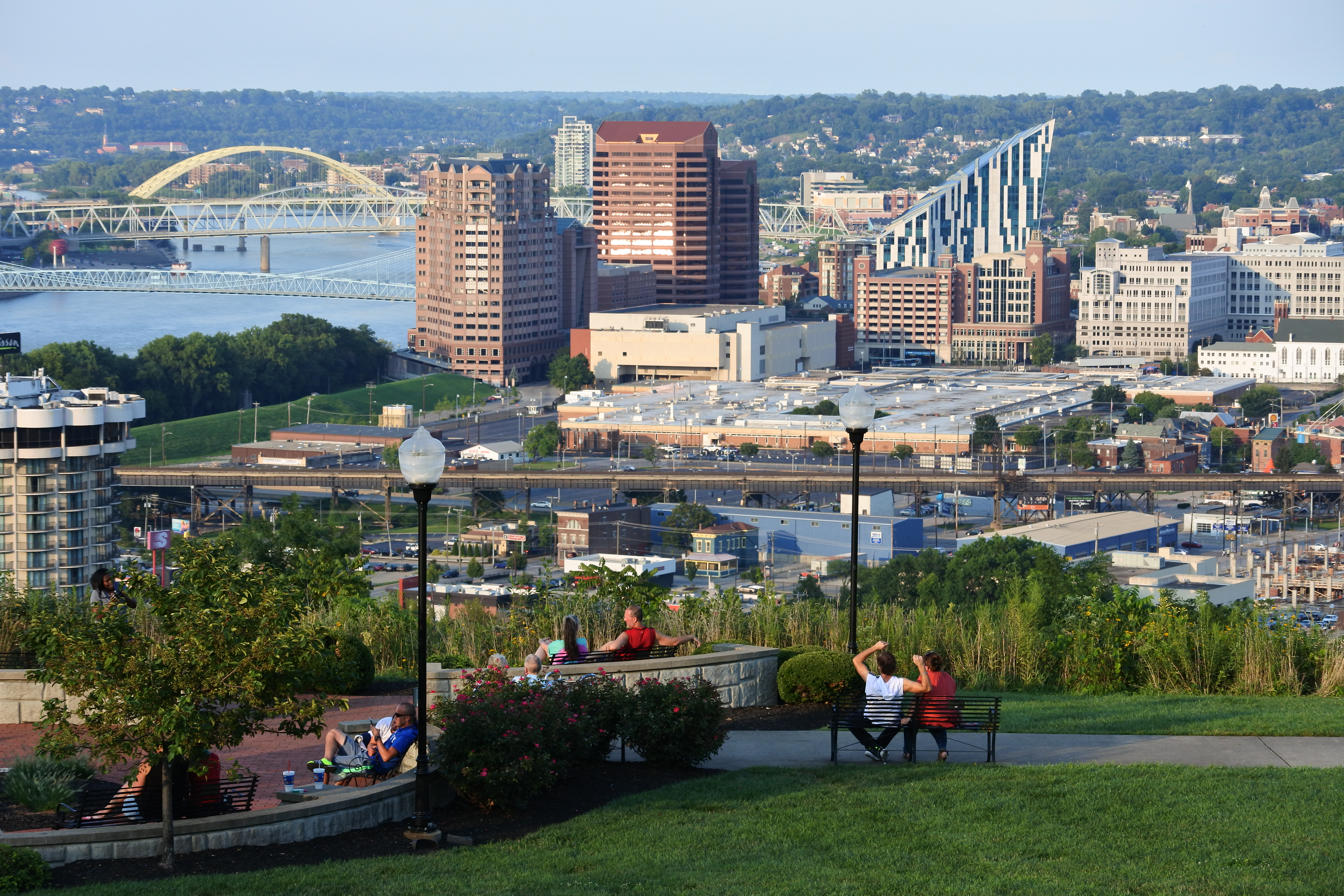
Covington is the largest city in Northern Kentucky.

Population figures as of the 2020 census.

=== Municipalities with more than 100,000 inhabitants ===
- Cincinnati, Ohio (309,317)

=== Municipalities with 50,000 to 99,999 inhabitants ===
- Hamilton, Ohio (63,399)
- Middletown, Ohio (50,987)

=== Municipalities with 10,000 to 49,999 inhabitants ===
- Fairfield, Ohio (42,623)
- Covington, Kentucky (40,961)
- Mason, Ohio (40,691 )
- Florence, Kentucky (31,946)
- Independence, Kentucky (28,676)
- Oxford, Ohio (23,035)
- Lebanon, Ohio (20,841)
- Forest Park, Ohio (20,189)
- Erlanger, Kentucky (19,611)
- Springboro, Ohio (19,062)
- Norwood, Ohio (19,043)
- Fort Thomas, Kentucky (17,438)
- Newport, Kentucky (14,150)
- Sharonville, Ohio (14,117)
- Blue Ash, Ohio (13,394)
- Loveland, Ohio (13,307)
- Wilmington, Ohio (12,660) (CSA)
- Springdale, Ohio (11,007)
- Reading, Ohio (10,600)
- Alexandria, Kentucky (10,341)

== Subregions ==
=== Northern Kentucky ===
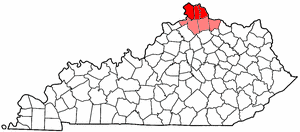
Map of Northern Kentucky with the 3 main counties highlighted in red

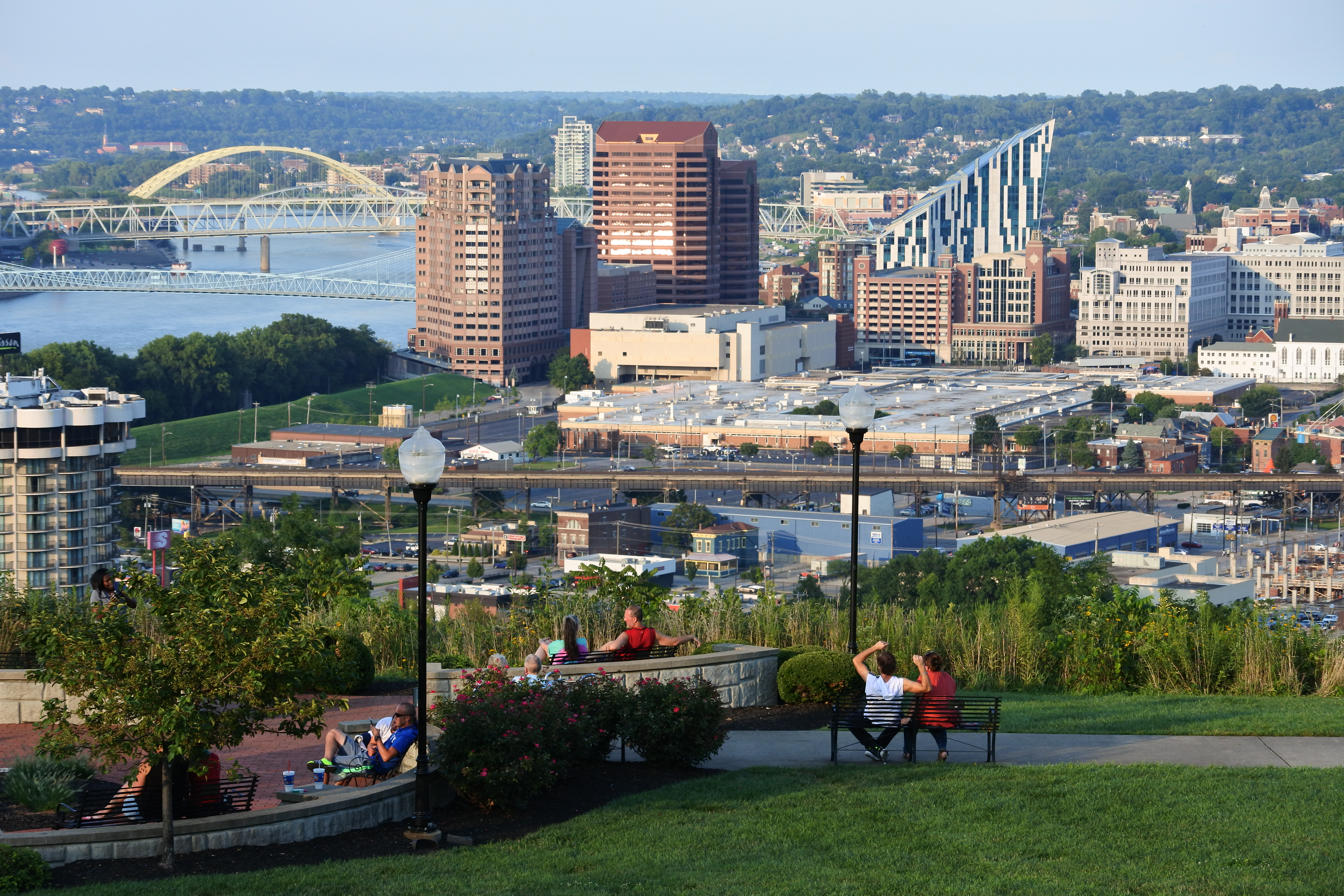
Skyline of Covington, Kentucky

Northern Kentucky, also known as NKY, is typically defined as comprising the following:

- Kenton County
- Boone County
- Campbell County
- Grant County
- Pendleton County
- Bracken County
- Gallatin County

Northern Kentucky is usually considered to be the main suburban area within Greater Cincinnati, as cities such as Covington and Newport are located directly south of Downtown Cincinnati across the Ohio River. It is also home to CVG airport.

Northern Kentucky was central to the Defense of Cincinnati and contains many Cincinnati attractions, including Newport Aquarium.

Northern Kentucky is home to three of the largest cities in Kentucky: Covington (5th), Florence (8th) and Independence (12th)

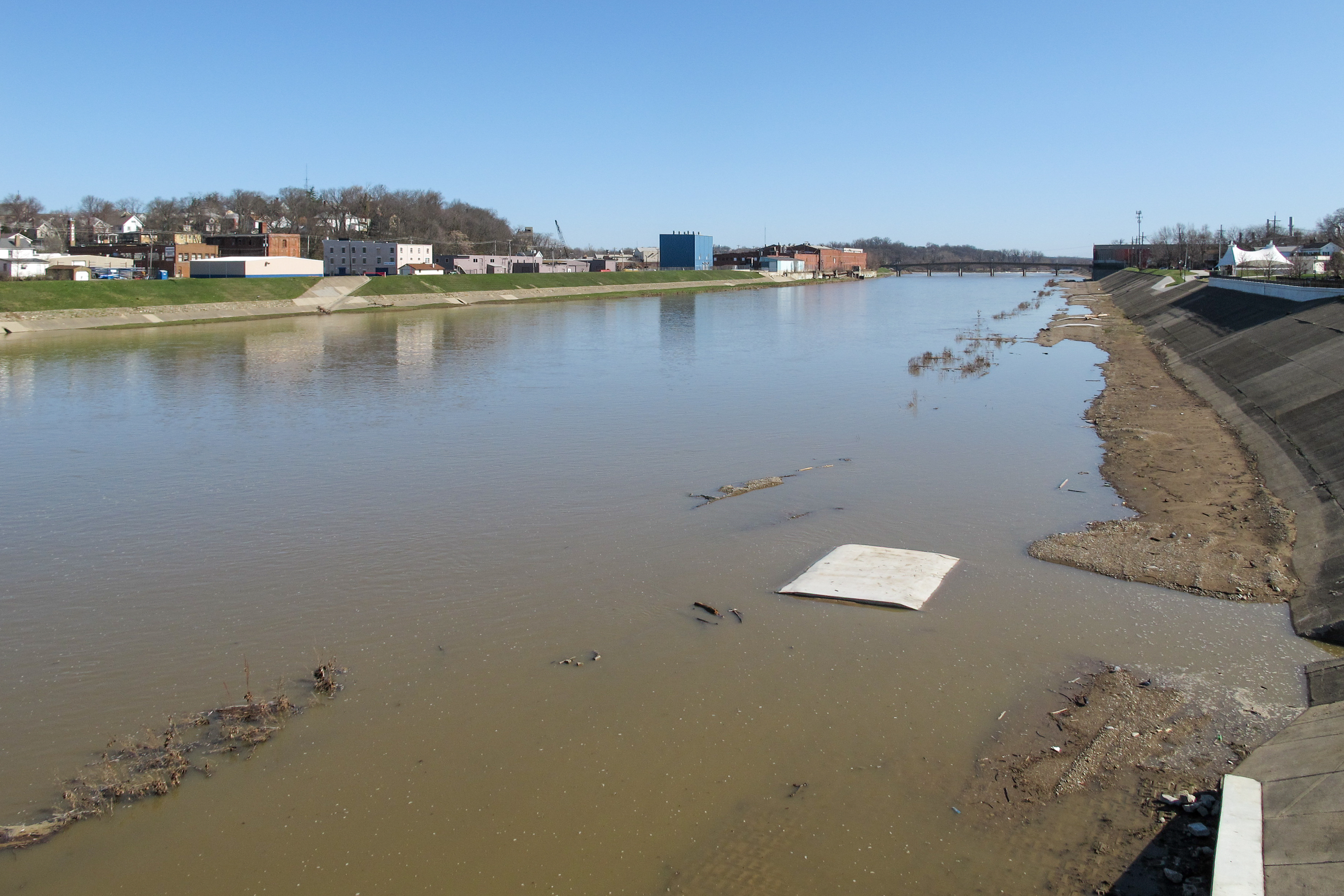
View of Miami River from Hamilton, Ohio in 2015

=== Miami River Valley ===
The Miami Valley, or Miami River Valley, is the region surrounding the Great Miami River in Ohio. The region is currently separated into the Dayton metropolitan area and Greater Cincinnati. The counties included in Greater Cincinnati are:

- Hamilton County
- Warren County
- Butler County

The Miami River Valley is home to many large cities; including Hamilton, Middletown, and Fairfield and is considered to be a large portion of the suburban population.

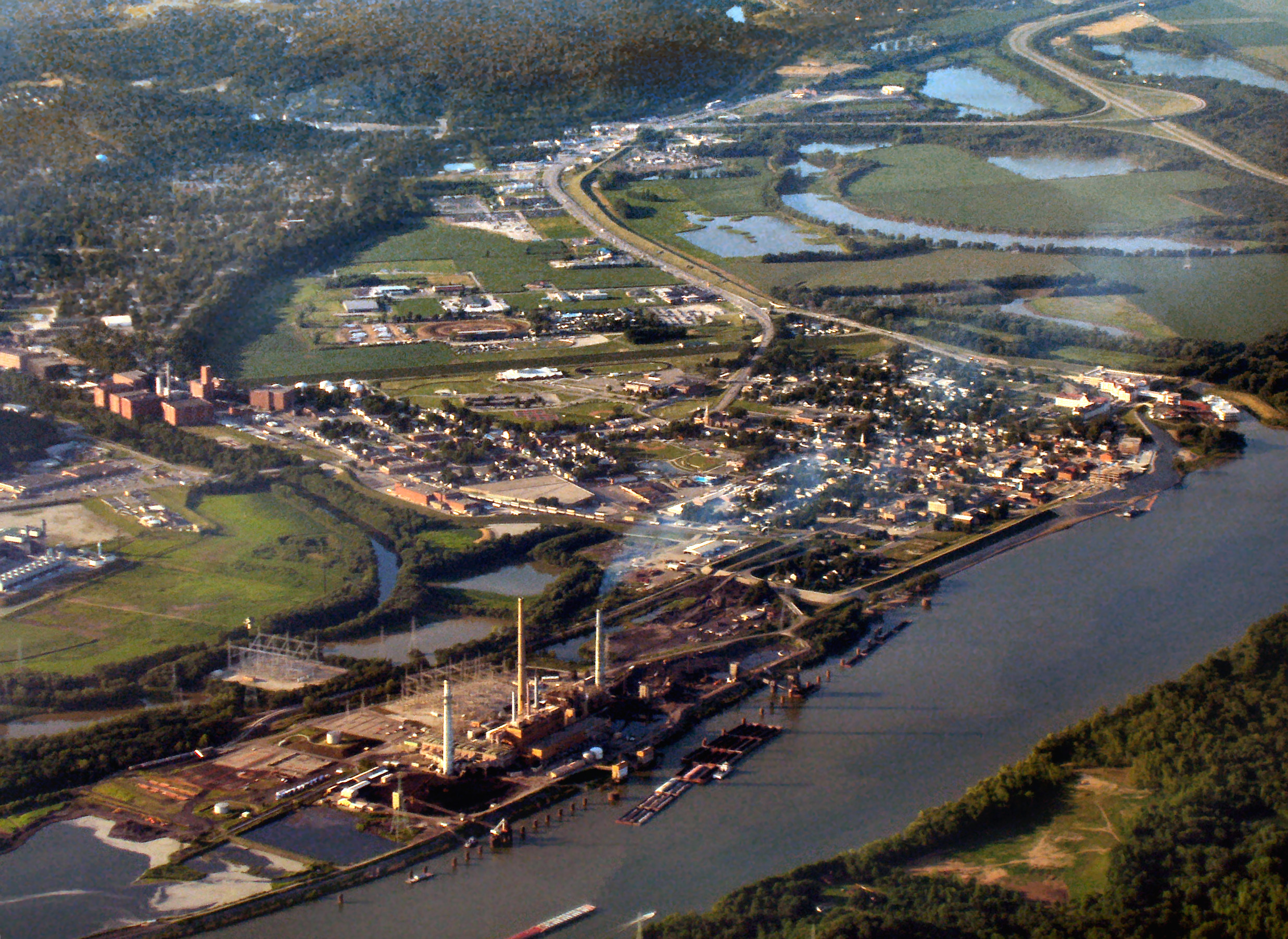
Arial photo of Lawrenceburg, Indiana

=== Southeastern Indiana ===
Southeastern Indiana is made up of multiple counties, but not all of them are located in Greater Cincinnati. The counties included in Greater Cincinnati are:

- Dearborn County
- Ohio County
- Franklin County

Most of Southeastern Indiana is rural, but a large portion of the population lives in cities like Lawrenceburg, Aurora and Rising Sun. Most of the cities have ties to industry and river trade.

== Climate ==
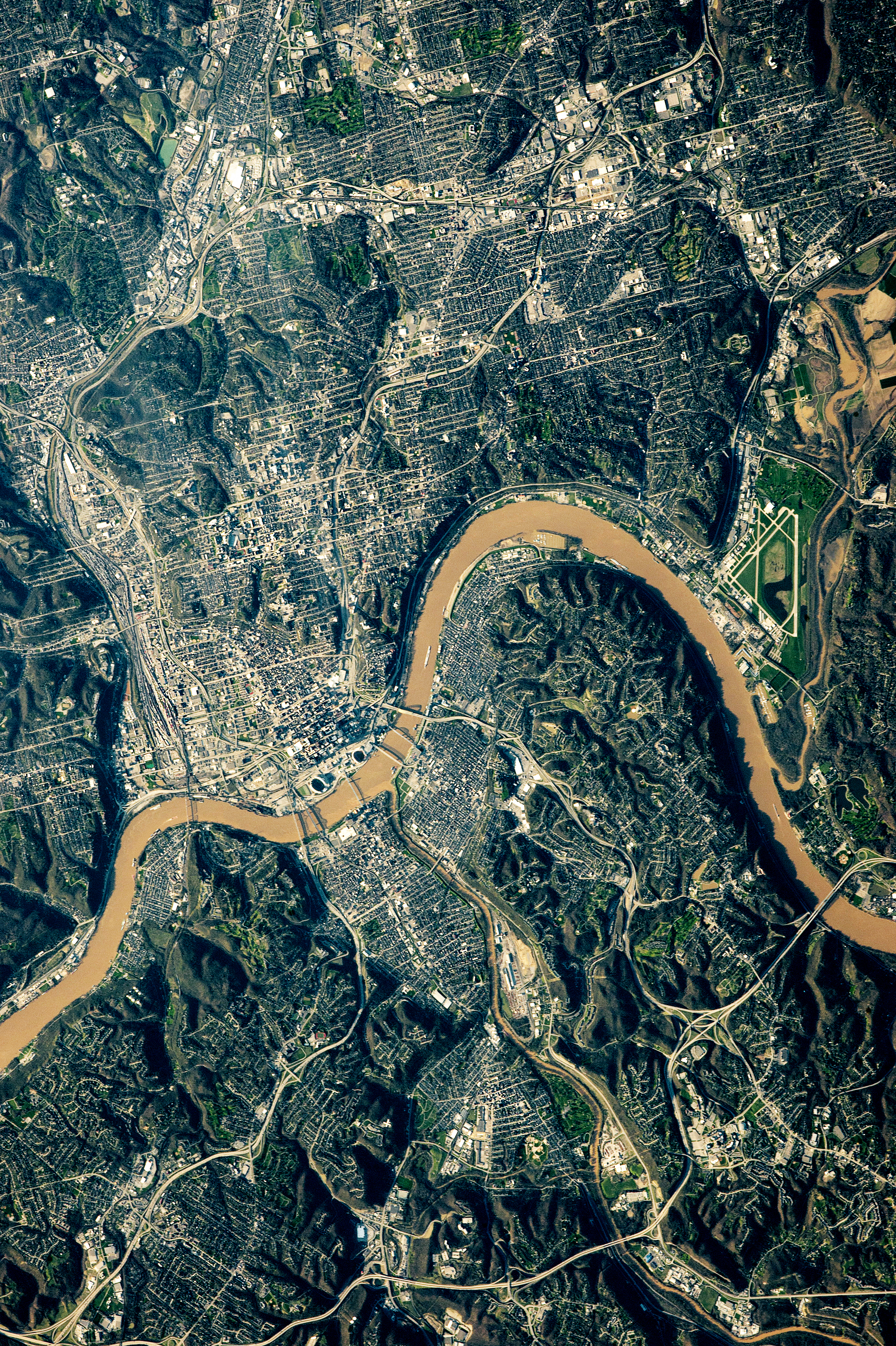
A NASA image of the Cincinnati metropolitan area. The Ohio River separates the states of Ohio and Kentucky.

The Cincinnati–Northern Kentucky metropolitan area is located within a climatic transition zone. The southern area of the region, from roughly about the Ohio River, is at the extreme northern limit of the humid subtropical climate; the north part of the region is on the extreme southern cusp of the humid continental climate. Evidence of both humid subtropical climate and humid continental climate can be found here, particularly noticeable by the presence of plants indicative of each climatic region. Within the area, the USDA climate zone rating can vary from as warm as zone 6b to as cool as zone 5b, with the warmest areas tending to be found closest to the Ohio River; individual microclimates of even cooler and warmer temperature may occur in the area but are too small to be considered in the overall climate zone rating. The common wall lizard, introduced from Italy in the 1950s, is an example of fauna in the area that lends a subtropical ambiance to the urban core (near downtown Cincinnati) area of the region.

Significant moderating variables for the overall climate are:

- South and central: Ohio River, Licking River, relatively large hills and valleys, and a combined urban heat island effect due to the close proximity of the Cincinnati-Northern Kentucky cities of Covington, Newport, and Downtown Cincinnati
- Suburban: large parking lots that take up much land in Mason, West Chester, and Florence create a heat island effect.
- North: Great Miami River, the area is situated on a glaciated flat plateau, the Miami Valley, and some urban heat island effect in the immediate area of downtown Dayton and Hamilton.

Traveling through the region from North to South, a subtle but interesting change in climate can be observed and is most evidenced by the gradual increase in the occurrence of subtropical indicator plants in the landscape. Most noticeable are the Southern Magnolia and Mimosa trees, and the needle palm also may be found as a winter hardy landscape specimen in lawns near the Ohio River. During the winter, travellers from north to south will routinely observe a significant difference in snowfall/ice/rain in the region.

Although widely accepted as part of the very southern fringe of the Midwestern United States in most cases, the Cincinnati–Northern Kentucky metropolitan area is climatically and geographically located on the northern periphery of the Upland South region of the United States and is within the Bluegrass region of Ohio and Kentucky in the Upper South.

The area is vulnerable to occasional severe weather—thunderstorms, large hail and sometimes tornadoes.

Climate data for Cincinnati (Cincinnati/Northern Kentucky Int'l), 1991–2020 normals, (Note: Mean monthly maxima and minima (i.e. the expected highest and lowest temperature readings at any point during the year or given month) calculated based on data at said location from 1991 to 2020.) extremes 1871–present (Note: Official records for Cincinnati kept at downtown from January 1871 to March 1915, at the Cincinnati Abbe Observatory just north of downtown from April 1915 to March 1947, and at KCVG near Hebron, Kentucky since April 1947. For more information, see Threadex and History of Weather Observations Cincinnati, Ohio 1789–1947.)
Month	Jan	Feb	Mar	Apr	May	Jun	Jul	Aug	Sep	Oct	Nov	Dec	Year
Record high °F (°C)	77 (25)	79 (26)	88 (31)	90 (32)	95 (35)	102 (39)	108 (42)	103 (39)	102 (39)	95 (35)	82 (28)	75 (24)	108 (42)
Mean maximum °F (°C)	61.8 (16.6)	66.1 (18.9)	74.3 (23.5)	81.1 (27.3)	86.7 (30.4)	91.6 (33.1)	93.6 (34.2)	93.2 (34.0)	90.7 (32.6)	82.9 (28.3)	72.0 (22.2)	63.8 (17.7)	95.3 (35.2)
Mean daily maximum °F (°C)	39.6 (4.2)	43.7 (6.5)	53.5 (11.9)	65.5 (18.6)	74.5 (23.6)	82.6 (28.1)	86.0 (30.0)	85.2 (29.6)	78.9 (26.1)	66.7 (19.3)	53.8 (12.1)	43.3 (6.3)	64.4 (18.0)
Daily mean °F (°C)	31.4 (−0.3)	34.7 (1.5)	43.6 (6.4)	54.6 (12.6)	64.1 (17.8)	72.3 (22.4)	75.9 (24.4)	74.9 (23.8)	68.1 (20.1)	56.2 (13.4)	44.4 (6.9)	35.6 (2.0)	54.7 (12.6)
Mean daily minimum °F (°C)	23.1 (−4.9)	25.8 (−3.4)	33.8 (1.0)	43.7 (6.5)	53.7 (12.1)	62.1 (16.7)	65.9 (18.8)	64.6 (18.1)	57.3 (14.1)	45.7 (7.6)	35.1 (1.7)	27.9 (−2.3)	44.9 (7.2)
Mean minimum °F (°C)	0.1 (−17.7)	6.5 (−14.2)	14.8 (−9.6)	26.7 (−2.9)	36.6 (2.6)	49.2 (9.6)	55.9 (13.3)	54.6 (12.6)	42.5 (5.8)	29.8 (−1.2)	19.0 (−7.2)	9.1 (−12.7)	−2.7 (−19.3)
Record low °F (°C)	−25 (−32)	−17 (−27)	−11 (−24)	15 (−9)	27 (−3)	39 (4)	47 (8)	43 (6)	31 (−1)	16 (−9)	0 (−18)	−20 (−29)	−25 (−32)
Average precipitation inches (mm)	3.30 (84)	3.17 (81)	4.16 (106)	4.53 (115)	4.67 (119)	4.75 (121)	3.83 (97)	3.43 (87)	3.11 (79)	3.35 (85)	3.23 (82)	3.73 (95)	45.26 (1,150)
Average snowfall inches (cm)	7.7 (20)	6.7 (17)	3.4 (8.6)	0.4 (1.0)	0.0 (0.0)	0.0 (0.0)	0.0 (0.0)	0.0 (0.0)	0.0 (0.0)	0.2 (0.51)	0.8 (2.0)	4.1 (10)	23.3 (59)
Average extreme snow depth inches (cm)	3.5 (8.9)	3.4 (8.6)	2.0 (5.1)	0.2 (0.51)	0.0 (0.0)	0.0 (0.0)	0.0 (0.0)	0.0 (0.0)	0.0 (0.0)	0.1 (0.25)	0.4 (1.0)	2.0 (5.1)	6.0 (15)
Average precipitation days (≥ 0.01 in)	13.2	12.0	12.5	13.1	13.5	11.8	11.0	8.9	8.3	8.7	10.3	12.4	135.7
Average snowy days (≥ 0.1 in)	6.7	5.9	2.7	0.6	0.0	0.0	0.0	0.0	0.0	0.1	1.1	4.6	21.7
Average relative humidity (%)	72.2	70.1	67.0	62.8	66.9	69.2	71.5	72.3	72.7	69.2	71.0	73.8	69.9
Average dew point °F (°C)	19.9 (−6.7)	22.5 (−5.3)	31.3 (−0.4)	39.6 (4.2)	50.5 (10.3)	59.7 (15.4)	64.2 (17.9)	63.0 (17.2)	56.7 (13.7)	43.7 (6.5)	34.7 (1.5)	25.5 (−3.6)	42.6 (5.9)
Mean monthly sunshine hours	120.8	128.4	170.1	211.0	249.9	275.5	277.0	261.5	234.4	188.8	118.7	99.3	2,335.4
Percentage possible sunshine	40	43	46	53	56	62	61	62	63	55	39	34	52
Average ultraviolet index	2	3	5	6	8	9	9	8	7	4	2	2	5
Source 1: NOAA (relative humidity and sun 1961–1990)
Source 2: Weather Atlas (UV)

== Transportation ==
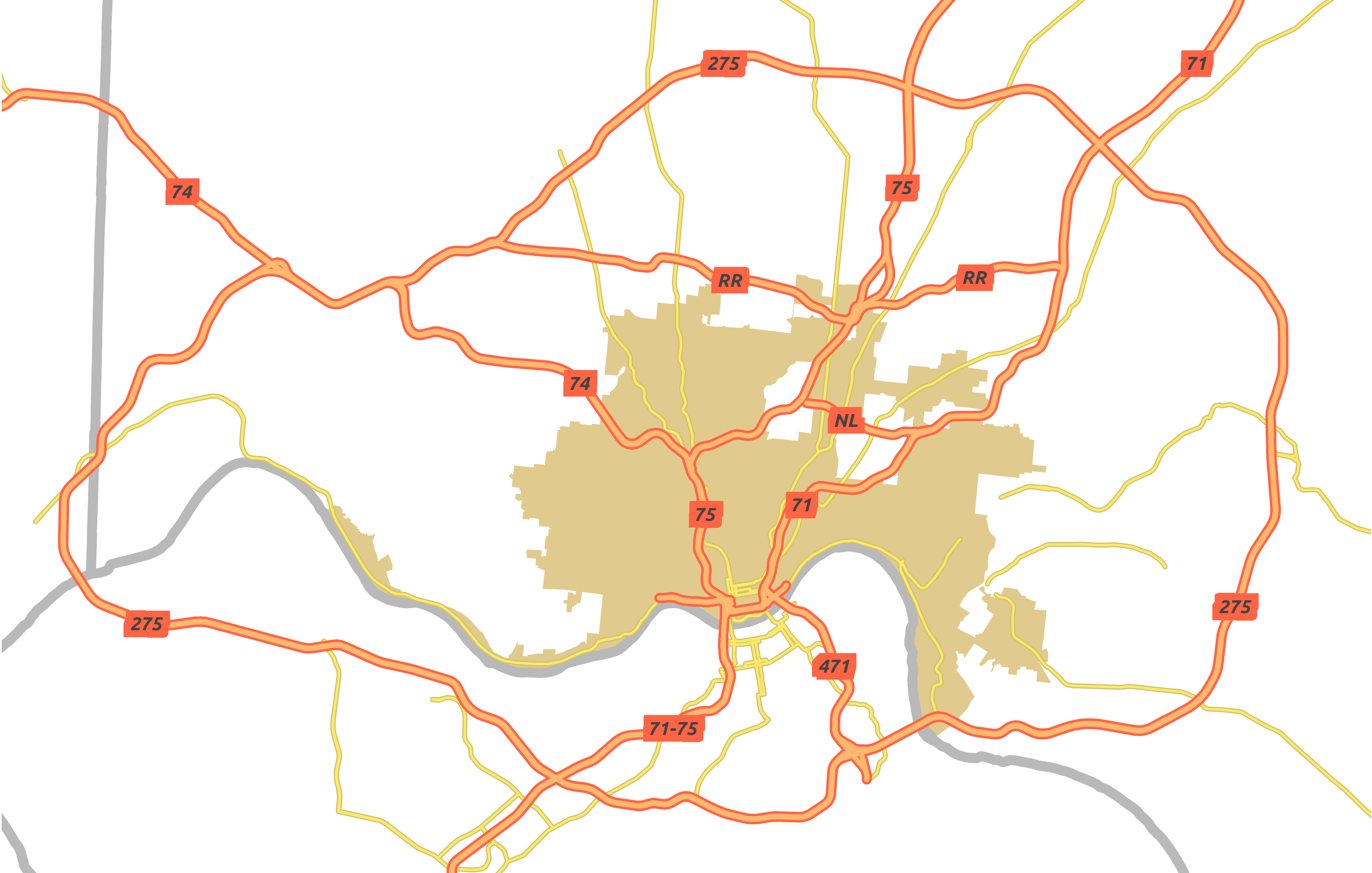
A map of Greater Cincinnati's freeways.

=== Public transportation ===
The Connector streetcar line opened in Cincinnati in 2016. Amtrak's Cardinal makes three weekly trips in each direction between Chicago and New York City through Cincinnati Union Terminal. Regional transit authorities serving the area include the Southwest Ohio Regional Transit Authority (SORTA), the Transit Authority of Northern Kentucky (TANK) and the Clermont Transportation Connection. SORTA and TANK primarily operate 40-foot (12 m) diesel buses, though some lines are served by longer articulated or hybrid-engine buses.

=== Air ===
The Cincinnati area is served by Cincinnati/Northern Kentucky International Airport (CVG) in Hebron, Kentucky. The airport is one of DHL Aviation's three superhubs, offering non-stop passenger service to over 50 destinations in North America and Europe. The airport is a global hub for Amazon Air, Atlas Air, ABX Air, Kalitta Air, and DHL Aviation, handling numerous domestic and international cargo flights every day. CVG is currently the 6th busiest airport in the United States by cargo traffic, and is additionally the fastest-growing cargo airport in North America.

=== Roads ===
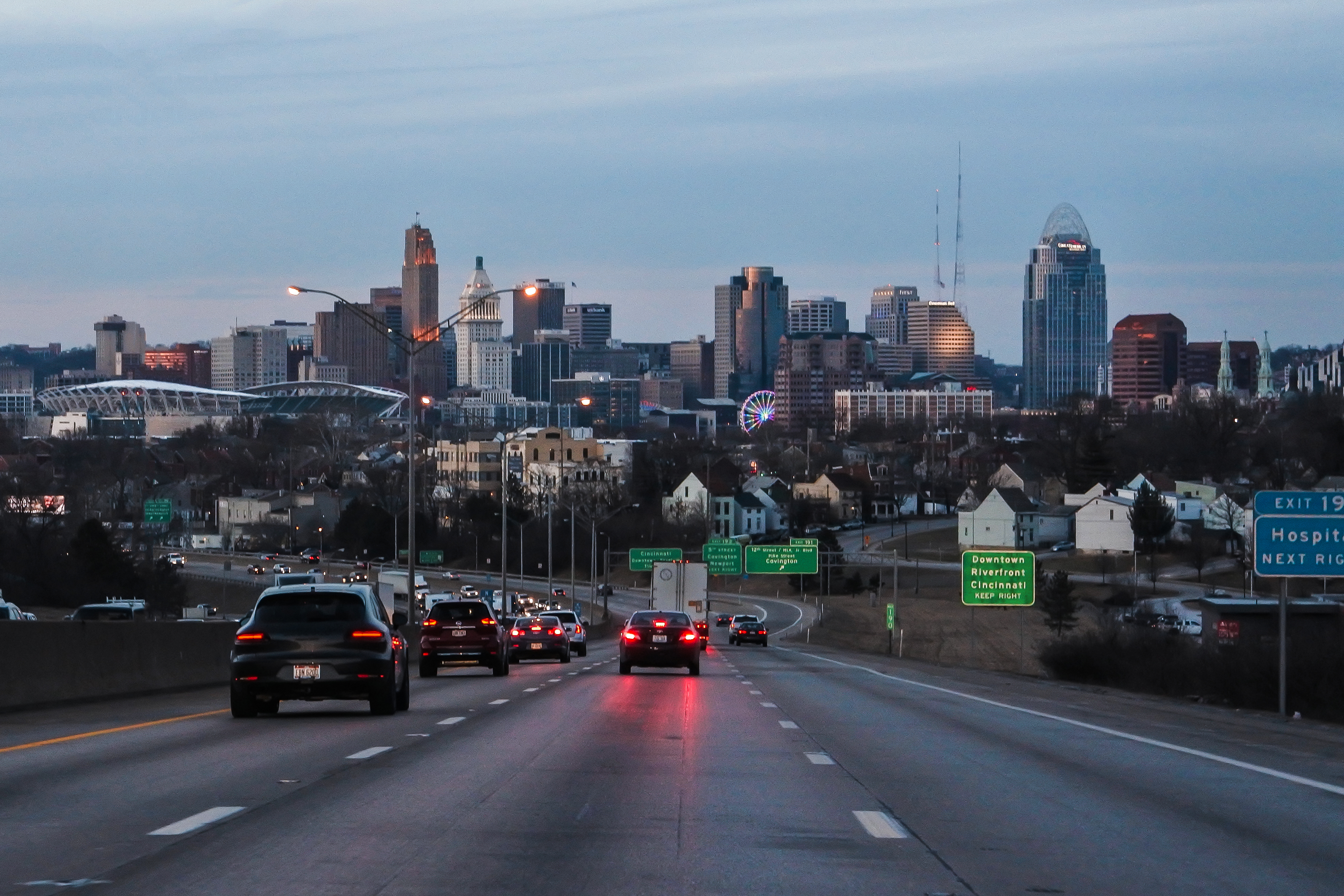
Interstate 71/Interstate 75 heading northbound into Cincinnati, Ohio from Covington, Kentucky

- Interstate 71
- Interstate 74
- Interstate 75
- Interstate 275
- Interstate 471

US Highways

- U.S. Route 22 & State Route 3 (Montgomery Road)
- U.S. Route 27 (Colerain Avenue)
- U.S. Route 42 (Reading Road, Lebanon Road)
- U.S. Route 50 (Columbia Parkway, Ohio Pike)
- U.S. Route 52 (Riverside Drive, Kellogg Avenue)
- U.S. Route 127 (Hamilton Avenue)

Ohio State Highways

- Ohio State Route 4 (Springfield Pike, Dixie Highway)
- Ohio State Route 28
- Ohio State Route 32
- Ohio State Route 126 (Ronald Reagan Cross County Highway)
- Ohio State Route 129 (Butler County Veterans Highway)
- Ohio State Route 131
- Ohio State Route 562 (Norwood Lateral)
- Ohio State Route 747 (Princeton Pike)

Kentucky State Highways

- Kentucky Route 9 (AA Highway)
- Kentucky Route 17 (Madison Pike)
- Kentucky Route 18 (Burlington Pike)
- Kentucky Route 177 (Decoursey Pike)

==== Historic and notable roads ====
- Vine Street, Cincinnati
- Fort Washington Way

== Culture ==
=== Sports ===
Listing of the professional sports teams in the Cincinnati Metropolitan Area:

==== Baseball ====
- Major League Baseball (MLB)
  - Cincinnati Reds
- Frontier League (FL)
  - Florence Yall's

==== Basketball ====
Cincinnati was home to an NBA team called the Cincinnati Royals from 1957 to 1972.

==== Football ====
- National Football League (NFL)
  - Cincinnati Bengals
- Arena Football One (AF1)
  - Kentucky Barrels
- Continental Football League (CoFL)
  - Cincinnati Dukes

==== Hockey ====
- ECHL
  - Cincinnati Cyclones

==== Soccer ====
- Major League Soccer (MLS)
  - FC Cincinnati
- MLS Next Pro
  - FC Cincinnati 2

==== College sports ====
- NCAA Division 1
  - Cincinnati Bearcats
  - Xavier Musketeers
  - Northern Kentucky Norse
  - Miami RedHawks
- NCAA Division 2
  - Thomas More Saints
- NCAA Division 3
  - Mount St. Joseph Lions

== Education ==
=== Ohio ===
- University of Cincinnati
- Xavier University
- Cincinnati State Technical and Community College
- Miami University
- Mount St. Joseph University
- Union Institute & University
- Hebrew Union College
- Art Academy of Cincinnati
- God's Bible School and College

=== Kentucky ===
- Northern Kentucky University
- Thomas More University
- Gateway Community and Technical College
- Maysville Community and Technical College

=== Indiana ===
- Ivy Tech Community College

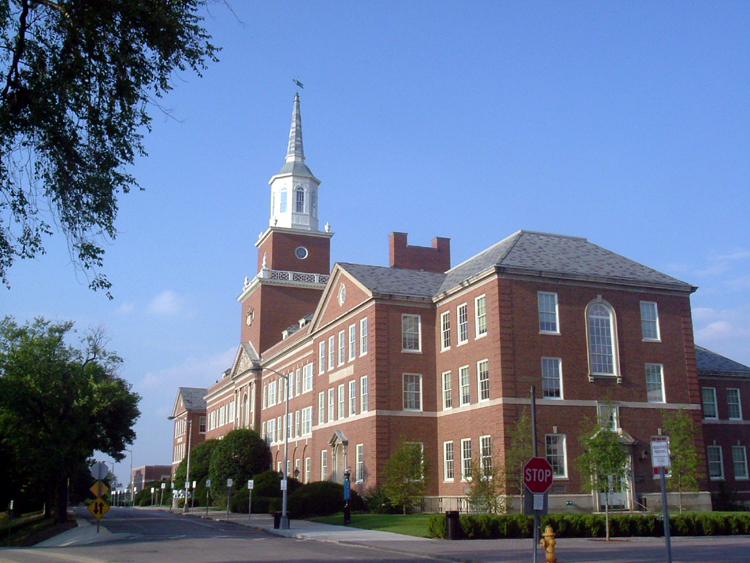
University of Cincinnati

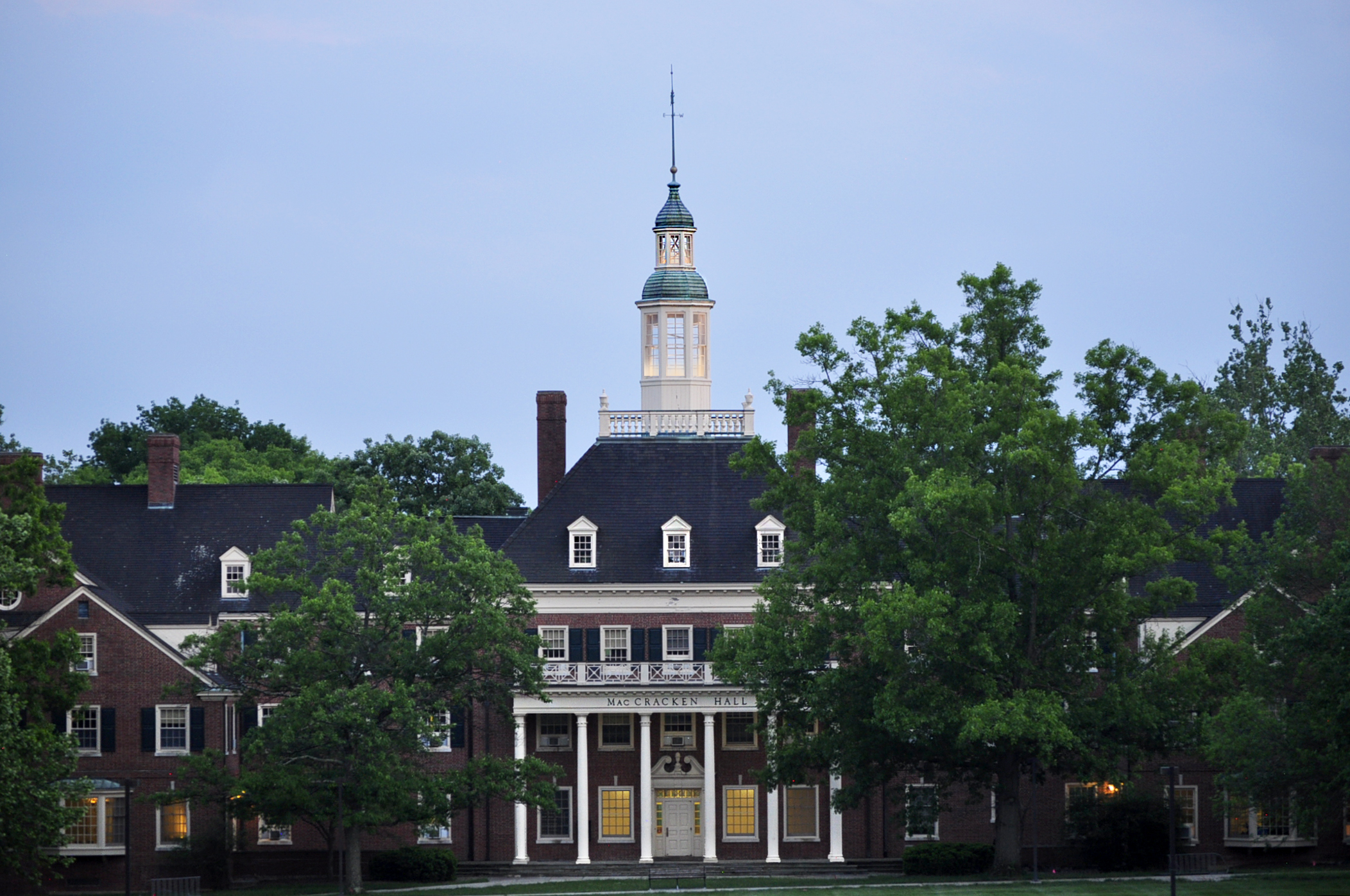
Miami University

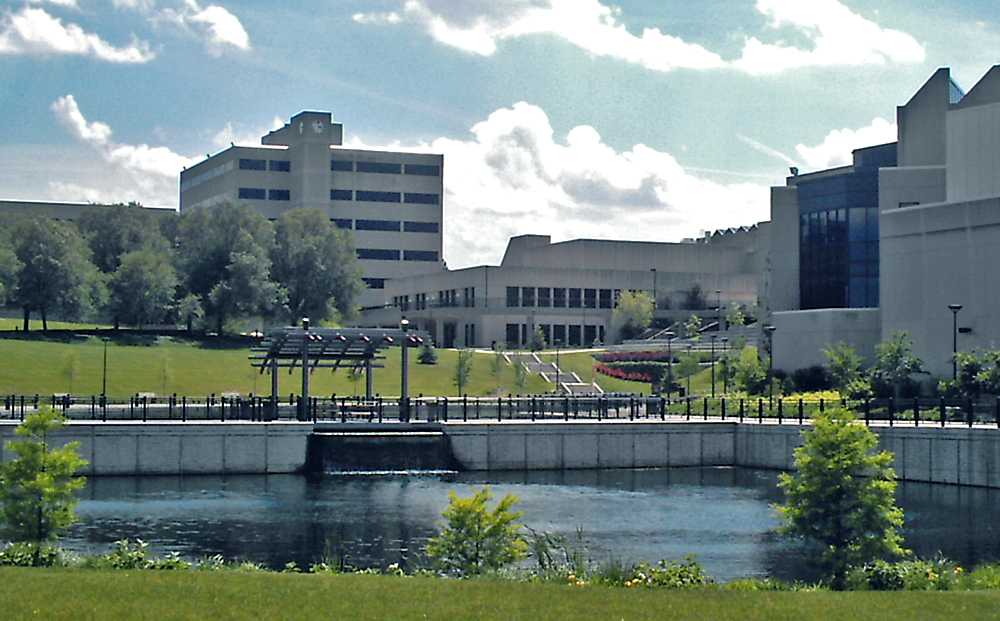
Northern Kentucky University

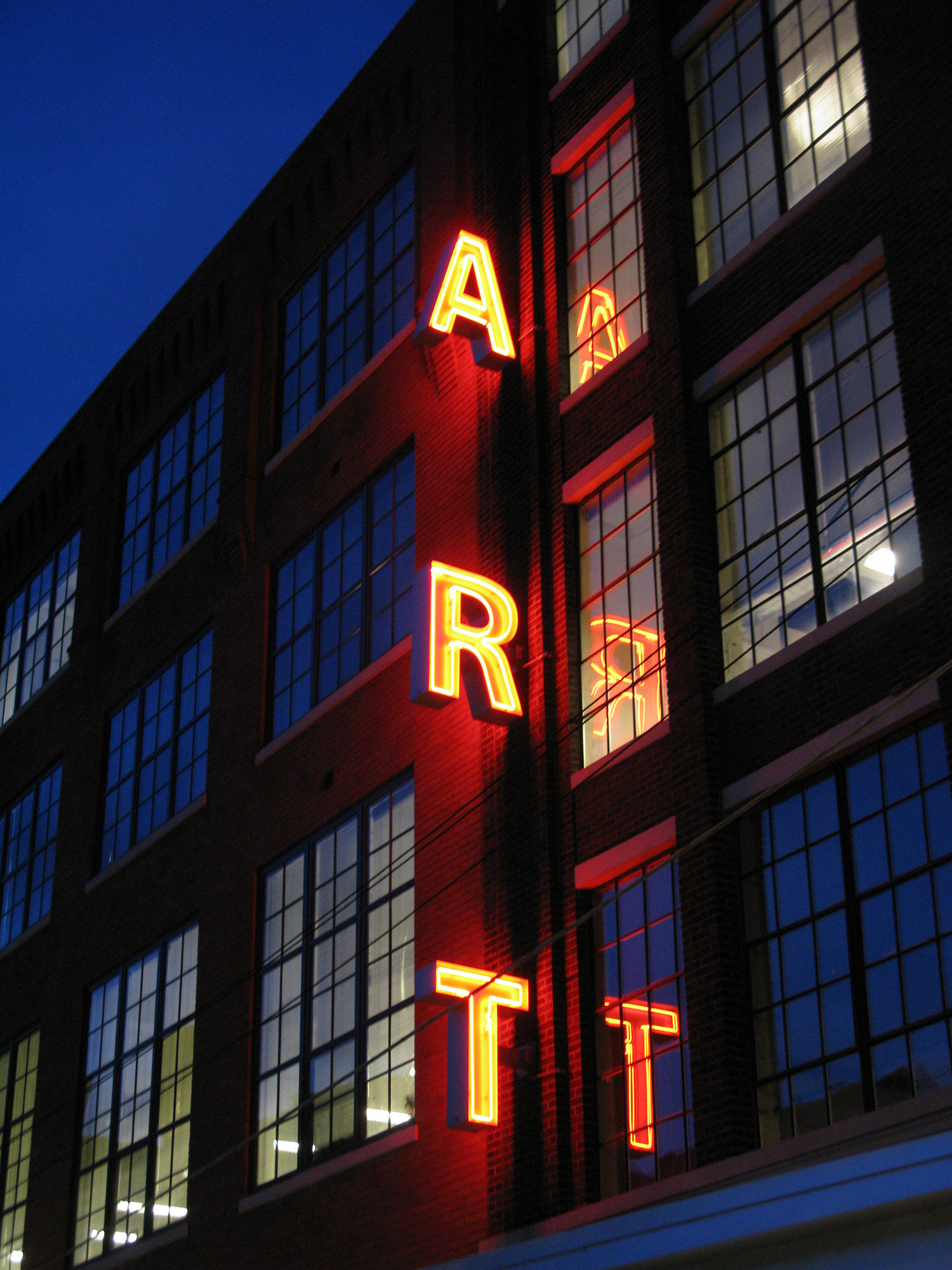
Art Academy of Cincinnati

== Area codes ==
- 513 and 283 – Ohio counties and Cincinnati
- 937 and 326 – Ohio counties
- 859 – most Kentucky counties
- 606 – Bracken and Mason counties, Kentucky
- 812 and 930 – Indiana counties
- 765 – Indiana counties

== In media ==
Cincinnati-based broadcast media outlets often use the terms "Greater Cincinnati" and "Tri-State Area" to refer to their broader viewing or listening areas, especially for the purpose of weather reports or school closings. The viewing areas of WLWT, WCPO-TV, and WKRC-TV all span the same 26 counties, including Adams and Highland counties in Ohio; Fayette, Ripley, Switzerland, and Union counties in Indiana; and Carroll, Owen, and Robertson counties in Kentucky. WXIX-TV additionally includes Decatur County in Indiana and Lewis County in Kentucky.

Dayton-area media outlets similarly refer to a Miami Valley area that includes Butler and Warren counties in Ohio and sometimes Clinton County, Ohio, and Union County, Indiana.
