= Cincinnati Transit Commission =

Public transit operator in Ohio, US

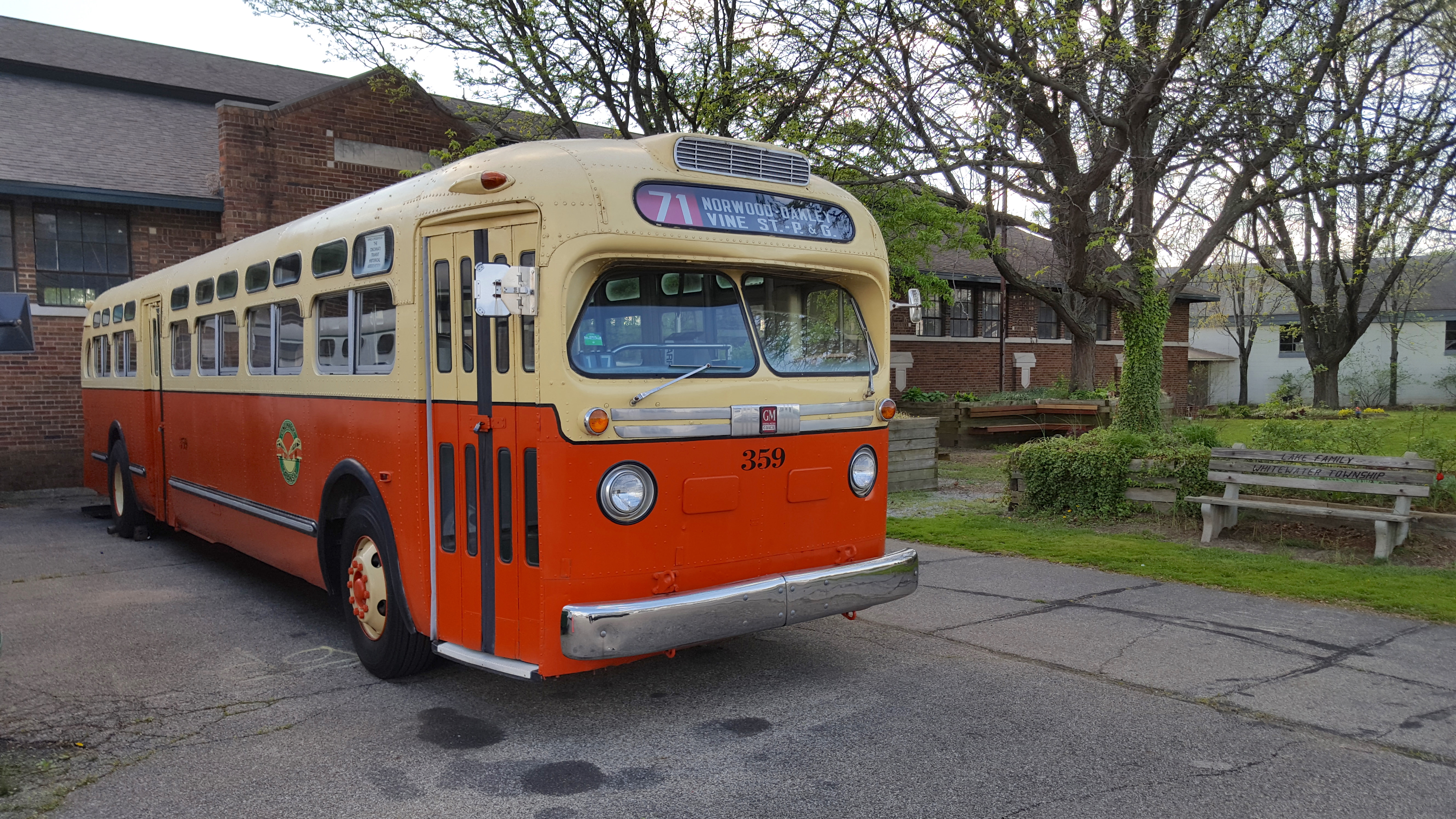
A 1957 GM "Old Look" bus last used by the Transit Authority of Northern Kentucky preserved and restored by the Cincinnati Transit Historical Association with the paint scheme and number once carried by similar buses of Cincinnati Transit

The Cincinnati Transit Company (CTC) (or Cincinnati Transit, Inc., abbreviated CT) was a privately owned, public transit operator in Cincinnati, Ohio which operated service from 1952 to 1973. It began operation on December 30, 1952, renamed from the Cincinnati Street Railway, as it only provided bus service after streetcar service ended in 1951. In 1973, the company was sold to the city of Cincinnati and renamed to Southwest Ohio Regional Transit Authority.

== History ==
On December 30, 1952, the Cincinnati Street Railway (CSR) was formally renamed to the Cincinnati Transit Commission. The company had not run any streetcar service since the network was dissolved in 1951. Initially, CTC service included both bus and trolley bus service inherited from CSR, but trolley bus service in Cincinnati ended on June 18, 1965. The CTC had previously sold 15 Marmon-Herrington TC-48 trolleybuses to the Toronto Transit Commission in 1953.

After a slow purchase of shares, in 1956 Cincinnati lawyers Benjamin Gettler and Jake Brown, alongside industrialist Lloyd Miller assumed majority ownership of the Cincinnati Transit Commission. Miller became chairman of the company's board, Brown the chairman of its executive committee, and Gettler its secretary. The trio later created the subsidiary company, American Controller Industries, which held all stock in the CTC, while the CTC remained in control of all company assets. The move enabled the CTC to be easily sold to the city of Cincinnati in 1973, the last privately owned transit system to be sold to a city in the United States. Subsequently, the Cincinnati Transit Commission was renamed to Southwest Ohio Regional Transit Authority.

== See also ==
- Streetcars in Cincinnati
