= Streetcars in Cincinnati =

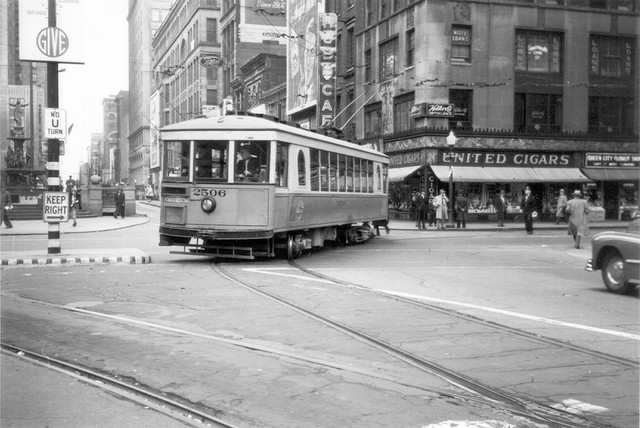
- A streetcar at 5th & Walnut, in downtown Cincinnati, on the previous system. A new system was opened in September 2016.

Operation
- Locale: Cincinnati, Ohio, U.S.

Statistics
Horsecar era: 1859–c. 1903
- Track gauge: 5 ft 2 1/2 in (1,588 mm)
First electric era: 1889–1951
- Operator: Cincinnati Street Railway
- Track gauge: 5 ft 2 1/2 in (1,588 mm)
- Electrification: Overhead line, 600 V DC
- Route length: 222 mi (357 km) (maximum)
Second electric era: 2016–
- Status: Open – as the Connector
- Operator: Southwest Ohio Regional Transit Authority (SORTA)
- Track gauge: 4 ft 8 1/2 in (1,435 mm) standard gauge
- Electrification: Overhead line, 750 V DC

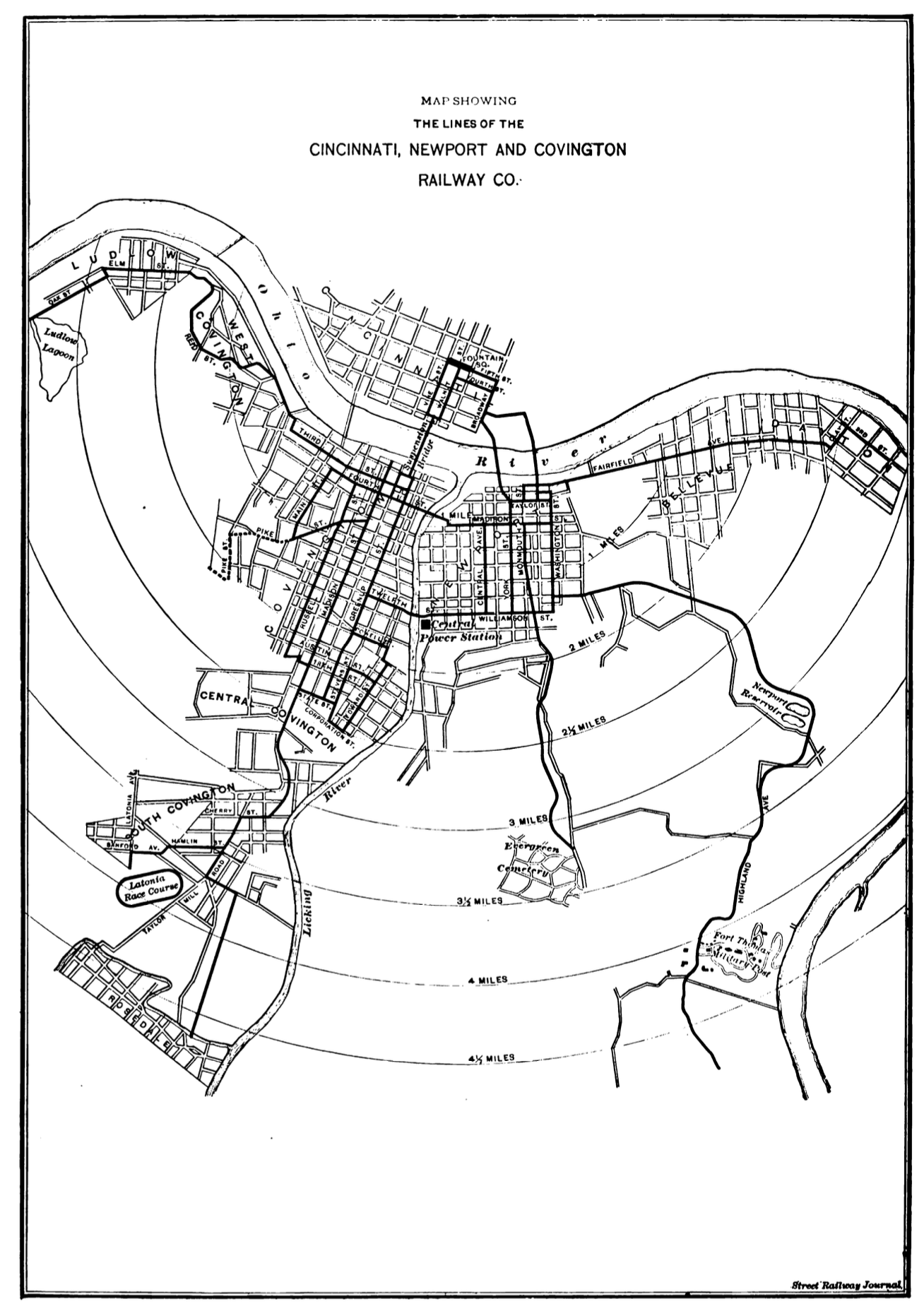
Electric Railway Lines of the Cincinnati, Newport, and Covington Railway Company c. 1894

Streetcars operated by the Cincinnati Street Railway were the main form of public transportation in Cincinnati, Ohio, at the end of the 19th century and the start of the 20th century. The first electric streetcars began operation in 1889, and at its maximum, the streetcar system had 222 miles (357 km) of track and carried more than 100 million passengers per year. A very unusual feature of the system was that cars on some of its routes traveled via inclined railways to serve areas on hills near downtown. With the advent of inexpensive automobiles and improved roads, transit ridership declined in the 20th century and the streetcar system closed in 1951. Construction of a new streetcar system, now known as the Connector, began in 2012. Consisting initially of a single route, the new system opened on September 9, 2016.

== Original system ==
Cincinnati's first settlers made their home on the large flat basin that now includes downtown, Over-the-Rhine, and the West End. By the 1850s, the city's population was too large for the basin alone, and people started moving to the city's surrounding hills. Horsecars were the first form of public transportation, with operation beginning on September 14, 1859. Although horsecars had been running in New Orleans since 1835, very few other cities introduced rail transit – in the form or horse- or mule-drawn cars – until the 1850s, and in 1859 Cincinnati was still one of the first few U.S. cities with such transit service. However, horse-drawn vehicles were inadequate because the animals would fatigue and the hills were impossible to climb in bad weather. Cities with hilly terrain such as Cincinnati and San Francisco began adopting cable cars, because they were faster and more reliable than horses.

The first cable car routes in Cincinnati were on Gilbert Avenue, Mount Auburn and Vine Street. Cable cars require that the car be pulled by a constantly running cable hidden under the street. Electricity proved to be cheaper and more reliable than cable cars, which required that the cable be replaced periodically. Consequently, starting on August 17, 1889, the first streetcars were introduced, and the existing cable cars were converted to electric streetcars or abandoned. The lines grew until there were 222 miles (357 km) of streetcar tracks in Cincinnati and Northern Kentucky. The track gauge was 5 ft 2 1/2 in (1,588 mm) (Pennsylvania trolley gauge). Some of the interurban lines serving Cincinnati also used this gauge, while others used standard gauge track.

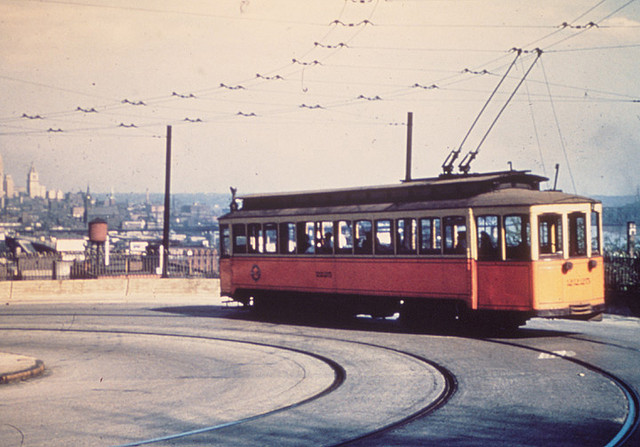
A streetcar c. the 1940s, with the double trolley poles which were an almost-unique feature of the Cincinnati streetcar system

For decades Cincinnati's streetcar system consistently carried over 100 million passengers a year. Comparatively, in 2000 approximately 25 million people rode Cincinnati's Metro bus system.

Cincinnati was one of only three cities in North America whose streetcars used double overhead trolley wire (two wires for each track) and twin trolley poles on each streetcar, the only others being Havana, Cuba, and the small Merrill, Wisconsin system. All routes used double trolley wire, the only exception being on route 78, a portion of which outside the city limits had only a single wire for each track. On all other North American streetcar systems the rails served as the return path for the electric current collected via the trolley pole, but this requires proper bonding of the rails to prevent stray current from escaping and interfering with nearby utility lines, such as telephone lines. In Cincinnati, the primary early streetcar operating company, the Cincinnati Street Railway, chose to install double-wire starting in 1889, to comply with a City requirement not to tear up freshly paved streets to install ground return bonding on their embedded track. Later, as the syndicate that owned Cincinnati Street Railway was buying out other lines to create a monopoly, they may have leveraged alleged complaints about buzzing sounds on phone lines to file suit, through the phone company (which was owned by the same syndicate) against their competetor, Cincinnati Inclined Plane Company (which used traditional single-wire overhead). The costs of extended litigation weakened the Cincinnati Incline Plane Company, which was eventually absorbed by CincinnatI Street Railway.

The city was also home to one of the country's larger streetcar manufacturers, the Cincinnati Car Company, which produced street-, interurban and rapid transit cars from 1902 until about 1931.

=== Use of inclines ===
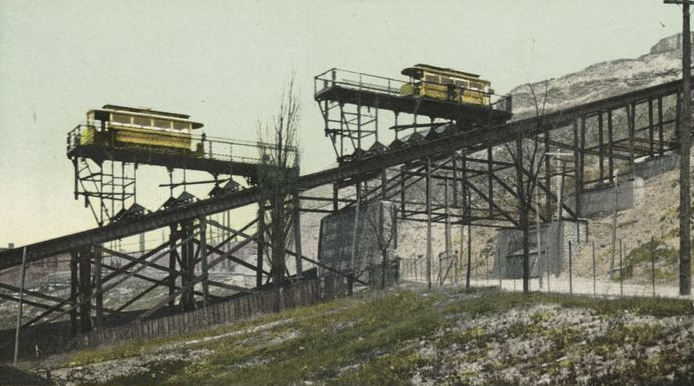
Inclines were used to take the streetcars up steep hills.

The streetcars were used in conjunction with four of Cincinnati's inclined railways, the Mount Adams Incline, Mount Auburn Incline, Bellevue Incline, and Fairview Incline. Except for the Fairview Incline, these originally conveyed horsecars, but were later equipped to carry electric streetcars. The cars would be driven onto the incline platform, which was level and was equipped with rails and (in most cases) overhead trolley wires. The platform, riding on its own rails, would then be pulled up the hill by the cable, carrying the streetcar. Once reaching the top, the streetcar could simply be driven off of the platform, onto the fixed-in-place track along city streets. The 1872-opened Mount Adams Incline began carrying horsecars in 1877, and it was later strengthened for use by electric streetcars, which were much heavier.

=== Decline and closure ===
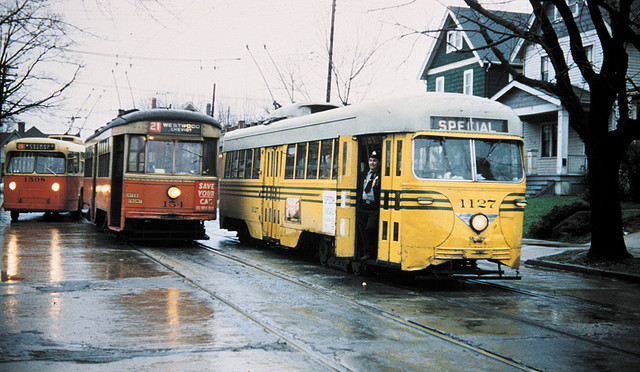
A then-new Cincinnati trolley coach with streetcars of two different generations, in the final days of service

Streetcars remained the main form of public transportation for the city until the growing usage of the automobile caused ridership to wane. With the improvement of local highways beginning before World War II, citizens were able to own more land and still be able to conveniently drive into the city to enjoy its benefits. Aided by an anti-rail stance by the City of Cincinnati and suburbs such as Norwood, the streetcars were quickly phased out after the war in favor of buses and trolley buses, and on April 29, 1951, the last streetcars were retired. The Mount Adams Incline closed in 1948, when routine inspection in preparation for repairs revealed that the undergirding timbers were dangerously decayed. This was the death knell of the incline, following complaints that it was "unsightly," cost too much, caused roadblocks, and was rendered useless by the automobile. At the time it was closed, the Mount Adams Incline was Cincinnati's top tourist attraction.

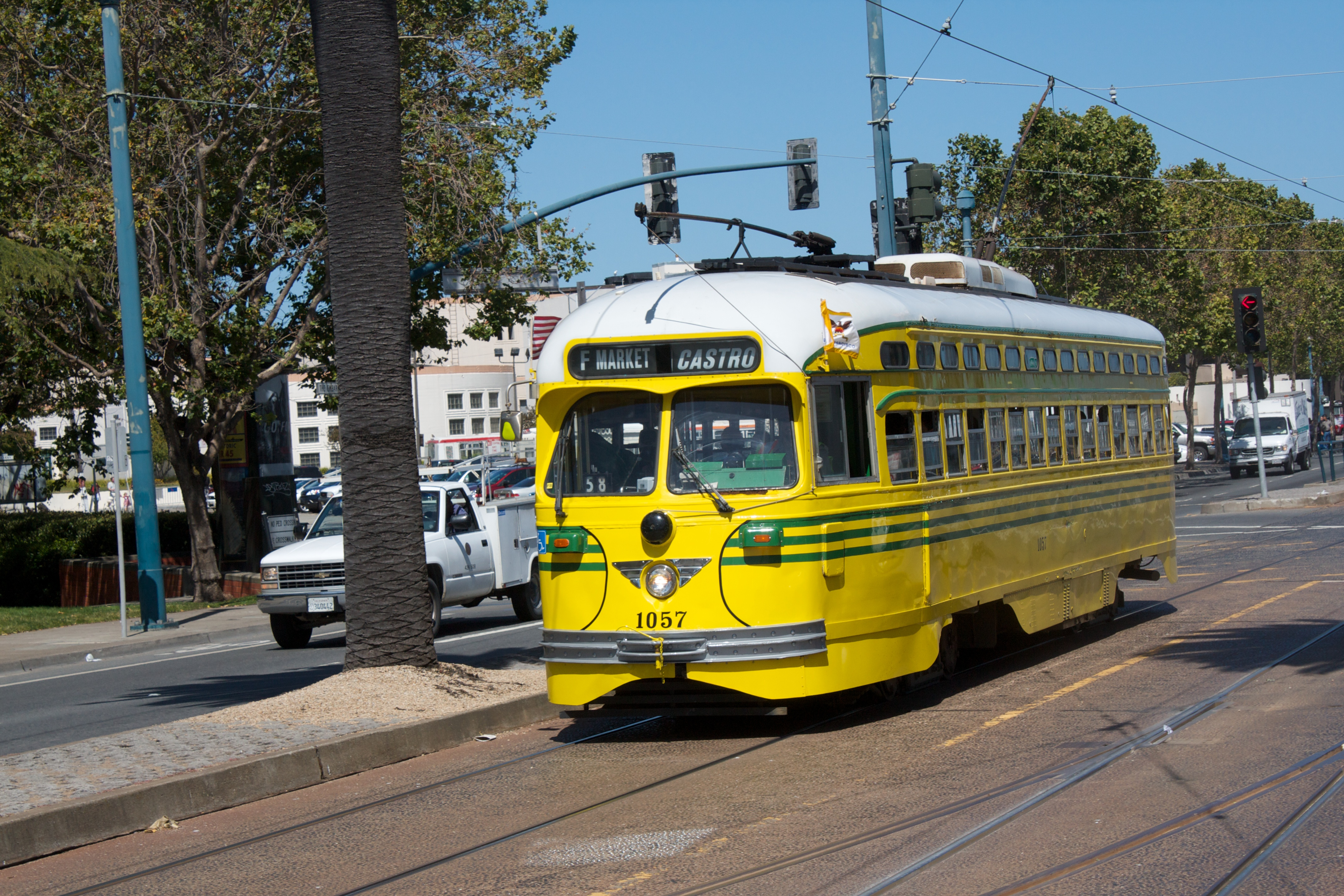
PCC streetcar on San Francisco's F Market & Wharves line is painted in the bright yellow and green livery of the Cincinnati Street Railway

The last five streetcar lines, abandoned on April 29, 1951, were routes 18-North Fairmount, 19-John Street, 21-Westwood-Cheviot, 55-Vine-Clifton and 78-Lockland. They were converted to trolley buses—commonly known as "trolley coaches" at that time—as had happened previously with several other streetcar lines. The city's trolley bus system lasted another 14 years, until June 18, 1965.

Cincinnati has been criticized for closing the streetcars and inclines without realizing their potential for tourism dollars. In 1947, San Francisco's cable car system was threatened with closure for similar reasons. A plan was put in place that would have replaced the city's cable cars with a new "super bus" system, but a public vote saved the cable cars. Today San Francisco's cable cars are vital to the city's tourism industry, carry 7.5 million passengers a year, and generate more than $20 million in fare revenue. A popular PCC streetcar on San Francisco's F Market & Wharves line is painted bright yellow with green stripes, in honor of the Cincinnati Street Railway.

== 21st century system ==
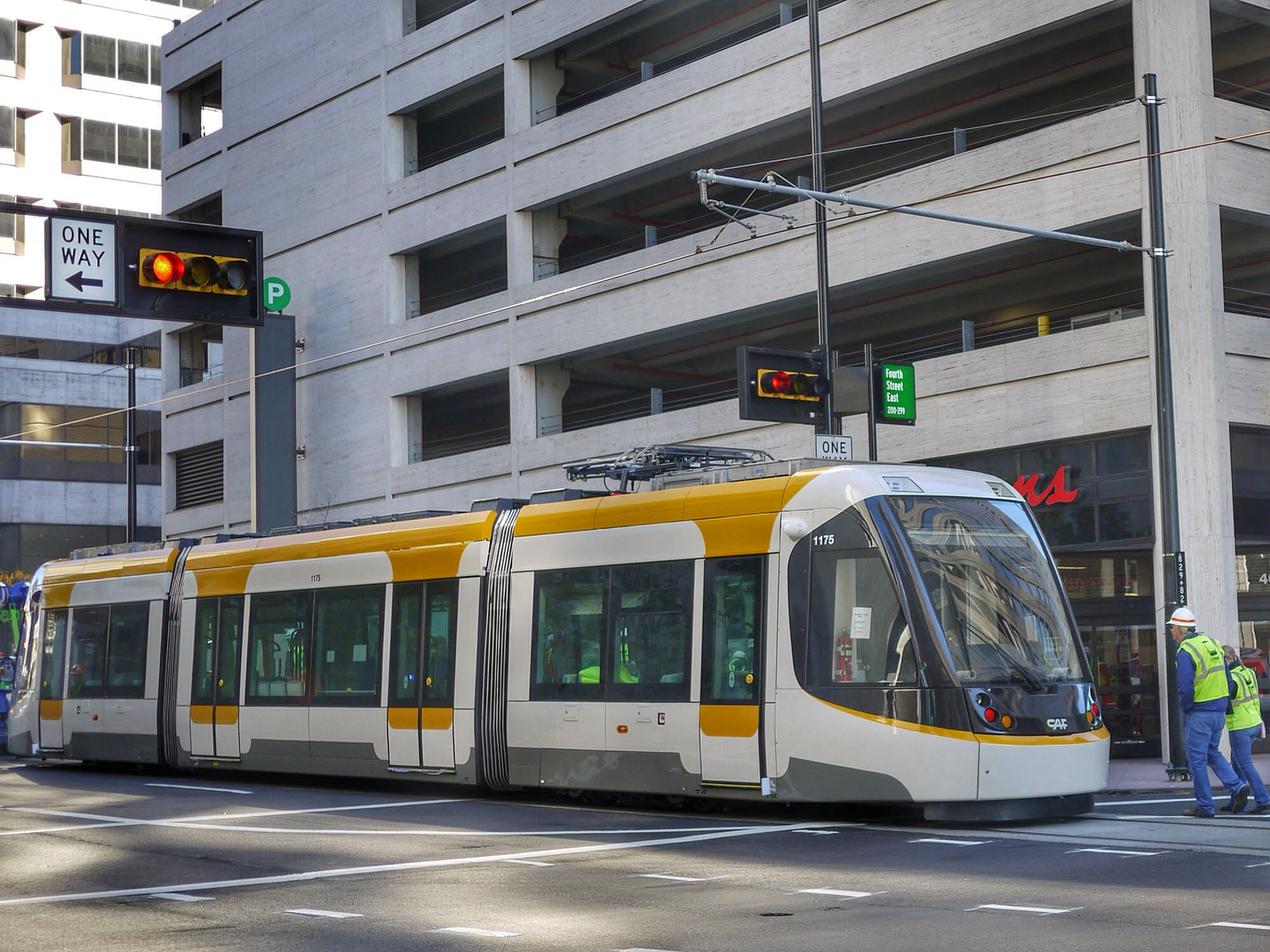
The Connector uses CAF Urbos 3 low-floor streetcars, one of which is shown here making the first test run in late 2015.

Proposals to build a new streetcar line began being discussed in about 2001, as a way to energize housing and development in Over-the-Rhine, Downtown Cincinnati, and the "uptown" neighborhoods that surround the University of Cincinnati, after Portland, Oregon, opened a modern streetcar system in 2001 that was credited with generating significant new property development in what had been decaying areas adjacent to downtown. The Cincinnati proposals generated both support and criticism and were studied and revised several times after 2002. Following a 2007 study of the potential benefits of building a modern streetcar system, the Cincinnati City Council gave its approval in 2008 to a plan to build a new streetcar line. In 2009 and 2011, the city voted on referendums designed to stop the streetcar project, but in both cases a majority of voters favored the project. Ground was broken for the Downtown – Over-the-Rhine line on February 17, 2012, and utility relocation began at that time. In July 2013, the City of Cincinnati signed a contract for the construction of the tracks, power system, and maintenance facility. During planning and construction, the new system was called Cincinnati Streetcar, but it was renamed the Cincinnati Bell Connector under a naming rights deal with Cincinnati Bell shortly before the line's opening. The system opened to passengers on September 9, 2016.

== See also ==
- Cincinnati Subway
- Streetcars in North America
- List of streetcar systems in the United States (all-time list)
- List of tram and light rail transit systems (worldwide)
