= Southwest Ohio Regional Transit Authority =

Cincinnati, Ohio area public transit operator

Overview
- Owner: City of Cincinnati and Hamilton County
- Area served: Hamilton County (in addition provides commuter routes from Butler County, Clermont County, and Warren County into Cincinnati)
- Transit type: Bus, Express bus service, Paratransit
- Number of lines: 26 local; 1 limited; 20 express
- Number of stations: 3,800 bus stops
- Daily ridership: 46,500 (weekdays, Q2 2026)
- Annual ridership: 13,495,400 (2025)
- Chief executive: Andy Aiello
- Headquarters: 525 Vine Street, Suite 500 Cincinnati, Ohio
- Website: go-metro.com

Operation
- Began operation: December 30, 1952 (as Cincinnati Transit Commission)
- Number of vehicles: 353 transit buses, 46 paratransit vehicles

The Southwest Ohio Regional Transit Authority (SORTA) is the public transport agency serving Cincinnati and its Ohio suburbs. SORTA operates Metro fixed-route buses, bus rapid transit, microtransit, and paratransit services. SORTA's headquarters are located at the Huntington Building in Cincinnati’s Central Business District. The agency is managed by CEO and General Manager Andy Aiello along with a 13-member board of trustees. In 2025, the system had a ridership of 13,495,400, or about 46,500 per weekday as of the second quarter of 2026.

Downtown Cincinnati is also served by the Transit Authority of Northern Kentucky (TANK), whose transit services extend over the Ohio River into Northern Kentucky.

== History ==
In 1973, SORTA was established after the city of Cincinnati purchased the Cincinnati Transit Commission, which operated bus service from 1952 to 1973, and streetcar service from 1873 to 1952 as the Cincinnati Street Railway. SORTA took over bus service in 1973 under the name Queen City Metro, which was later shortened to Metro to reflect increased regional service. In 2012 Metro released its schedule information in the General Transit Feed Specification, making schedules more easily available to customers. The Cincinnati Bell Connector was operated by SORTA until 2019; the City of Cincinnati has since owned and operated the streetcar. Until 2021, Metro was funded primarily by Cincinnati's city earnings tax, second by fares, and third by federal sources, with some other minor sources. This stood in contrast to other Ohio transit agencies, such as COTA and GCRTA which are primarily funded by sales tax. The portion of Cincinnati's earnings tax going to Metro's budget was about 0.3%.

=== Reinventing Metro ===
On May 14, 2020, Hamilton County voters passed Issue 7, which switches the source of SORTA funding to a sales tax levy of 0.8 percent. The sales tax in Hamilton County raised to 7.8% and the Cincinnati earnings tax was eliminated. The levy is projected to generate $130 million a year, which will be split 100/30 between Metro and road infrastructure respectively. The new sales tax rate went into effect on October 1, 2020. The new funding will be used to implement Reinventing Metro, which is a transit network redesign of its fixed-route services, but also introduces Mobility on Demand and bus rapid transit (BRT) to the region.

An example related project is the Northside Transit Center, which is located in Northside and replaced a basic bus stop. The new transit center, which opened in 2020, features eight boarding bays, each with an architecturally designed shelter and enhanced streetscaping, lighting and amenities. In addition, the transit center features artwork designed by winners of the transit agency's art contest for Northside residents. The contest asked residents to submit designs following the theme, "What does Northside mean to me?”. The artwork is displayed prominently on installations at the transit center's entrance and exit. The Northside project was a partnership with the Federal Transit Administration, the Ohio Department of Transportation, and other local stakeholders.

== Services ==
=== Metro Bus routes ===
Metro operates about 43 major fixed bus routes, as well as a demand-responsive paratransit service. Of the major routes, roughly half run only at rush hours and are essentially commuter services, some of them serving the reverse commute. The other half operate throughout the day, and some offer increased frequency during rush hours. Approximately 90% of all trips are made on the all-day routes, and 10% on the express commuter routes. Routes 4, 17, 19, 33, 43, 51, and 78 run at all times.

Routes 29X Milford Express and 82X Eastgate Express extend into neighboring Clermont County under an arrangement with the Clermont Transportation Connection.

Route 71X Kings Island Express extends into neighboring Warren County under an arrangement with Warren County Transit.

Route 20 Winton Road-Forest Park has a layover at the Fairfield Meijer in neighboring Butler County with connections to Butler County Regional Transit Authority's Route R3 Oxford-Forest Park Connector at the Forest Park Park and Ride.

Current routes
Number	Route name	Route type
1	Mt. Adams	Local
2	Madeira	Local (Rush hour)
3X	Montgomery Express	Express
4	Montgomery Road	Local (24/7)
5	Blue Ash	Local (Crosstown)
6	Queen City Avenue	Local
8	Blue Ash – Silverton	Local (Rush Hour)
10	Erie Avenue	Local
11	Madison Road	Local
12	Madisonville	Local (Rush Hour)
16	Spring Grove/Daly	Local
17	Hamilton Avenue	Local (24/7)
19	Colerain Avenue	Local (24/7)
20	Winton Road	Local
21	Harrison Avenue	Local
22	Glenway - Madison	Local (Rush Hour Crosstown)
23X	Forest Park Express	Express
24	Beechmont - MLK	Local (Crosstown)
25	Mount Lookout	Local (Rush Hour)
27	Beekman – Linn	Local
28	East End	Local
29X	Milford Express	Express
30	Beechmont	Local (Rush Hour)
31	Taft – McMillan	Local (Crosstown)
32	West 8th Street	Local
33	Glenway Avenue	Local (24/7)
36	Price Hill – Uptown	Local (Crosstown)
37	MLK – Westwood	Local (Crosstown)
38	Uptown Commuter	Local (Rush Hour Crosstown)
40	Montana	Local (Rush Hour)
41	North Bend Road	Local (Crosstown)
43	Reading Road	Local (24/7)
46	Avondale	Local
47	Avondale - Oakley	Local (Crosstown)
49	Fairmount	Local
50	River Road	Local (Rush Hour)
51	Westwood – Avondale	Local (24/7 Crosstown)
52X	Harrison Express	Express
53	St. Bernard – Oakley	Local (Crosstown)
61	Galbraith Road	Local (Crosstown)
64	Westwood	Local
65	Western Hills	Local (Rush Hour Crosstown)
67	Kemper Road	Local (Crosstown)
70	UC Connector	Commuter
71X	Kings Island Express	Express
74X	Colerain Express	Express
75X	Anderson Express	Express
77	Delhi	Local
78	Vine Street	Local (24/7)
81	Mount Washington	Commuter
82X	Eastgate Express	Express
90	Metro*Plus	Local (Limited stops)

=== MetroNow! ===
Throughout 2021 and early 2022, Metro worked on developing an accessible, on-demand and localized mobility service, including connections to Metro's network of more than 40 fixed bus routes.

Previously referred to as "Mobility On-Demand," this service is now called MetroNow!, with two zones that launched pilot service in Spring of 2023. Metro has rolled out several zones, including Springdale/Sharonville, Northgate/Mt. Healthy, Forest Park/Pleasant Run, and Blue Ash/Montgomery.

=== Access Paratransit ===
In compliance with federal requirements under the Americans with Disabilities Act (ADA), Metro operates a paratransit service called Access for individuals with disabilities. ADA-accessible vans provide on-demand service within 3/4 miles of Metro bus service, during Metro's bus service hours. Riders must apply with Metro and receive certification of ADA eligibility before using Access service. Trips on Access are scheduled in advance, either by phone or through the Metro MyAccess app. As part of the July 16, 2025 fare changes, single ride Access trips are $4.40.

== Stops and stations ==
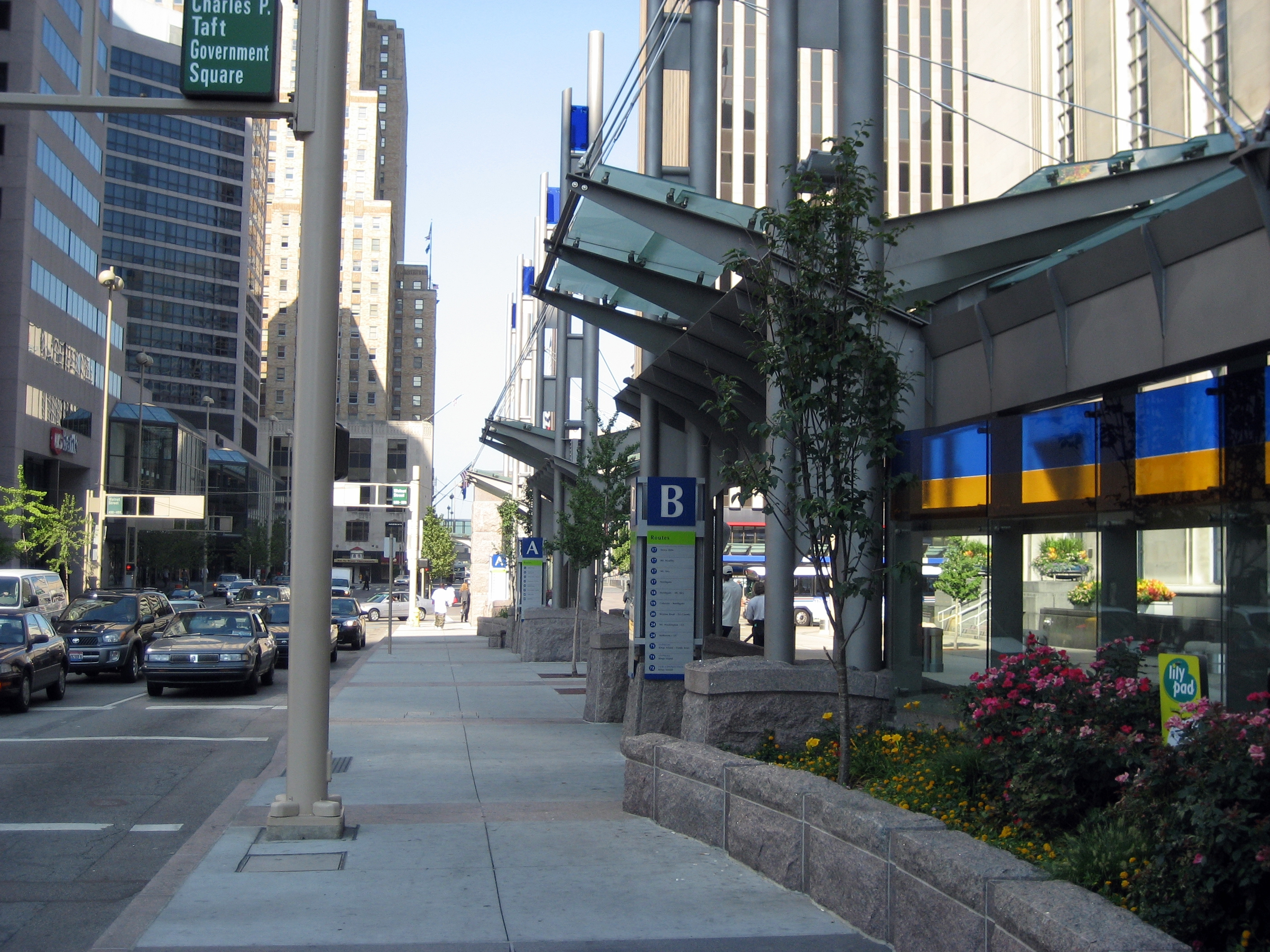
Located on Fifth Street between Walnut and Main in Cincinnati, Government Square serves as Metro's downtown transit hub.

Most of SORTA's roughly 3,600 stops are simply marked with a sign on a pole listing routes the stop serves. Several dozen stops include bus shelters and covered benches. Several suburban stops are Park and Rides. Government Square is the main transit station, located downtown near Fountain Square. SORTA owns and operates several transit centers across the region including the Northside Transit Center, Oakley Transit Center, and Glenway Crossing Transit Center. SORTA operates the Riverfront Transit Center, currently used as a layover point for the Metro*Plus route.

== Fares ==
As of July 16, 2025, local and commuter routes fare is $2.20 and express routes fare is $3.00. Commuter routes will now be known as local routes. Children under 55 inches ride free with an accompanying adult with a max of up to 2 children per adult.

Metro introduced their Tap&Save program, which is their version of fare capping. Users of the Transit app can preload money onto their accounts to pay for their fares. The system will track their spending and once they reach the equivalent price of day pass or 30 day pass, they will not have to pay any additional fares until the cycle resets.

Fares (as of July 16, 2025)
Fare type	Price	Half fare
Local Routes	$2.20	$1.10
Express Routes	$3	$1.50
Access Fare	$4.40	
Metro*NOW Fare	$2.50	No discounted fare.

SORTA passes
Fare type	Price
Local 24-Hour Pass	$4.40
Metro/TANK 24-Hour Pass	$5
Express 24-Hour Pass	$6
5-ride Local Ticket	$11
Half Fare 24-Hour Pass	$2.20
Local 30-day Pass	$88
Express 30-day Pass	$120
Metro/TANK 30-day Pass	$105
Suburban County Express 30-day Pass	$150

== Garages and fleet ==
SORTA operates around 300 Gillig buses with on fixed routes out of 2 garages, and about 50 smaller vehicles as part of their 'demand responsive services'. All vehicles in SORTA's fleet are ADA accessible. Vehicles in the fixed route fleet are rated, on average, for a capacity and 65 passengers, both sitting and standing.

All fixed-route buses have a bike rack mounted on the front with room for two bicycles.

SORTA has introduced 20 next-generation hybrid buses since 2023 and recently introduced their first set of all-electric buses on Earth Day 2026. 6 are currently in service with another 7 expected in 2027.

SORTA recently approved an order of 12 New Flyer Xcelsior articulated diesel buses for their BRT service called MetroRapid, which is set to launch in 2028 along Reading Road and Hamilton Avenue.

Garages

- Queensgate Garage is located at 1401 Bank Street, Cincinnati, OH 45214
- Bond Hill Garage is located at 4700 Paddock Road, Cincinnati, OH 45229

Present fleet

As of 2026, SORTA’s bus fleet consists of the following:

- Gillig Low Floor
- Gillig Low Floor HEV
- Gillig Low Floor Plus EV
- Gillig BRT Plus

== See also ==
Adjacent public transit agencies:

- Butler County Regional Transit Authority (BCRTA), serving Butler County, Ohio
- Clermont Transportation Connection (CTC), serving Clermont County, Ohio
- Connector, light rail system serving and operated by the City of Cincinnati
- Transit Authority of Northern Kentucky (TANK), serving Northern Kentucky
- Warren County Transit, serving Warren County, Ohio

Other major public transit agencies in Ohio:

- Central Ohio Transit Authority (COTA), serving Columbus, Ohio
- Greater Cleveland Regional Transit Authority (GCRTA), serving Cleveland, Ohio
- Greater Dayton Regional Transit Authority (formerly the Miami Valley RTA), serving Dayton, Ohio
