= Mount Adams Incline =

Former funicular railway

Coordinates: 39°06′23.7″N 84°29′58.6″W

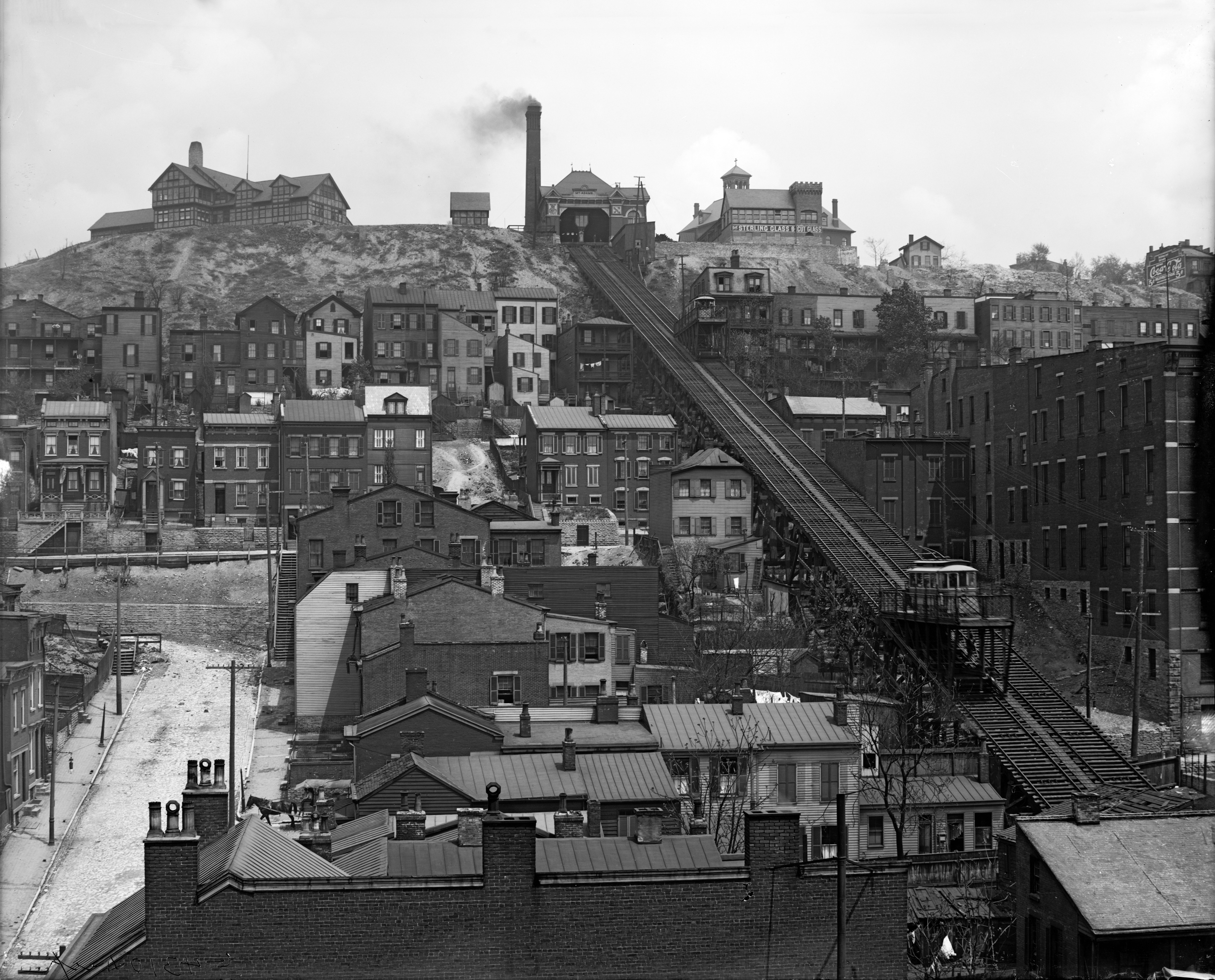
- The incline in operation c. 1905

Overview
- Headquarters: Cincinnati, OH
- Locale: Cincinnati, OH
- Dates of operation: 1876–1948

Technical
- Track gauge: 4 ft 8 1/2 in (1,435 mm) standard gauge

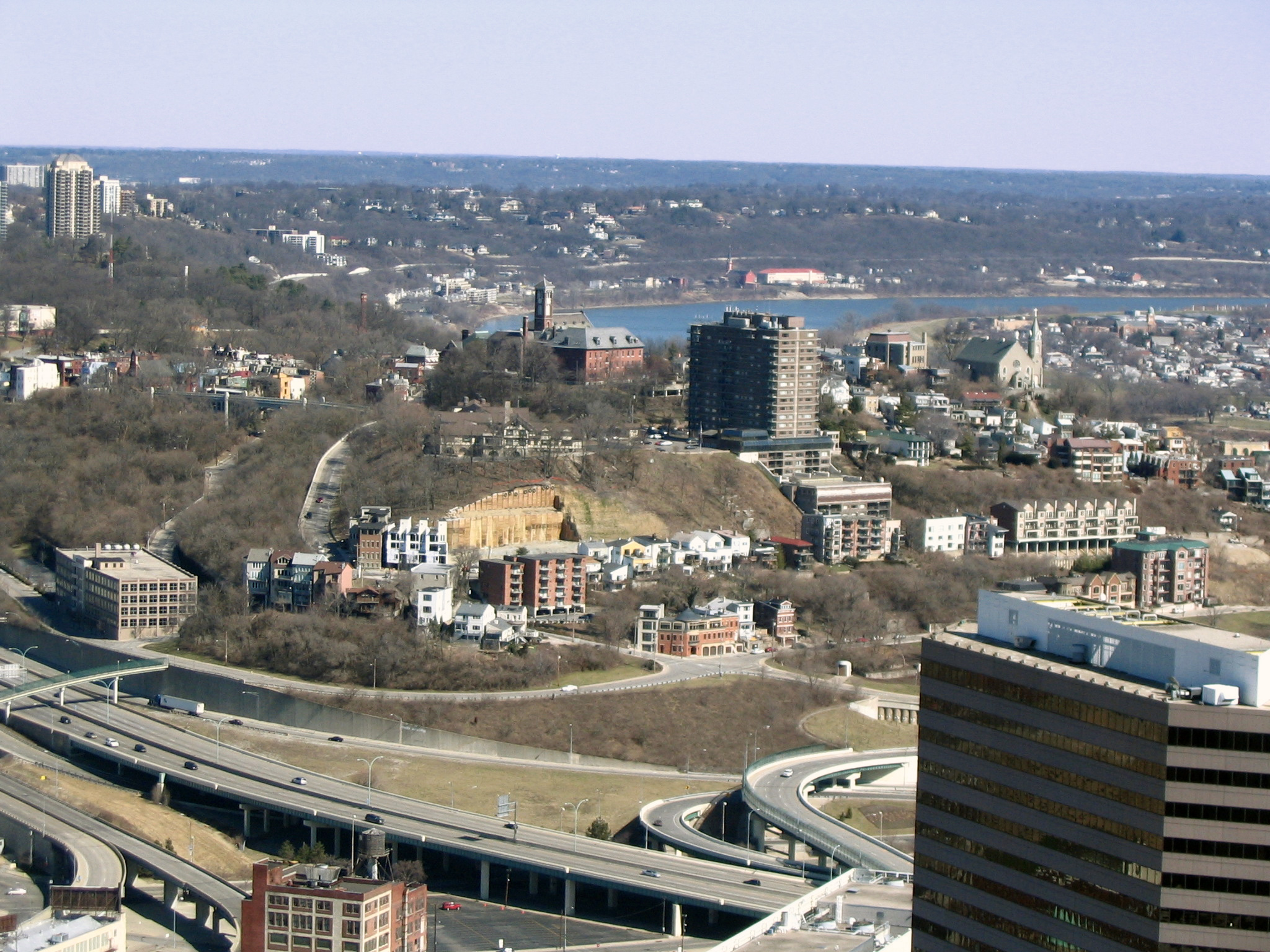
Site of the former Mount Adams Incline, with crumbling piers still visible in center of photo

The Mount Adams Incline was a funicular, or inclined railway, located in the Cincinnati neighborhood of Mount Adams. It was the third of the city's five inclines to open, beginning operations in 1876, and the last to close down in 1948. It has since been demolished.

The incline was 945 feet (288 m) long and carried streetcars and automobiles. It began carrying horsecars in 1877, and it was later strengthened for use by electric streetcars, which were much heavier.

== History ==
Planning for the incline was underway by 1873. The brick carhouse at the top of the hill was constructed by July 1874. The incline was officially opened as Cincinnati's third inclined railway on March 8, 1876.

The incline was closed for six months beginning in November 1879 for renovations to support electric streetcars instead of horse-drawn cars.

The incline underwent repairs in 1906 and was closed beginning on May 14.

In April 1948, the Cincinnati Street Railway Co. closed the incline for repairs. The following month, they announced that the repairs would take at least a year. With the announcement, they also detailed how the incline operated at a major loss; they said that in 1947, the incline earned $8,407.05 in fares and cost $68,617.49 to operate. The announcement led many locals to believe the incline would close permanently, and sparked cries to save the incline. Proposals included having the city take it over from the railway company, establishing a non-profit to operate it as a tourist attraction, or converting the carhouse atop the hill into a restaurant. These proposals ultimately did not come to fruition, and demolition of the structure began in February 1952.

== See also ==
- Funicular railway
- List of funicular railways
