= Clermont Transportation Connection =

Public transportation agency in Ohio, US

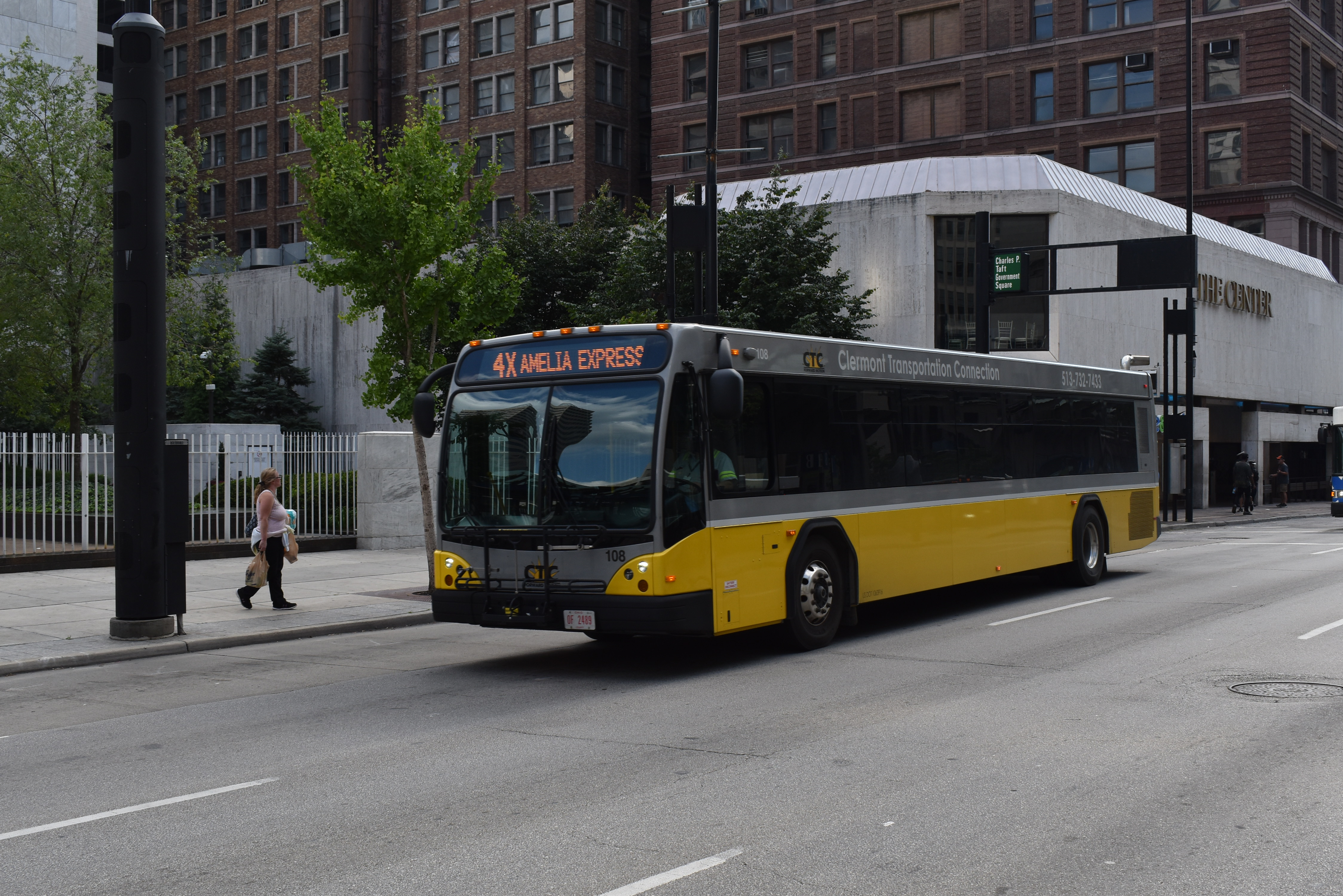
- A CTC bus leaves Government Square in downtown Cincinnati
- Founded: 1977
- Headquarters: 4003 Filager Road in Batavia, Ohio
- Service area: Clermont County, Ohio
- Service type: Bus
- Routes: 2
- Fuel type: Diesel
- Website: ctc.clermontcountyohio.gov

Clermont Transportation Connection (CTC) is a public transportation agency serving Clermont County, Ohio, United States. It operates two fixed transit bus routes, the Dial-A-Ride demand responsive transport service, and paratransit service. The two fixed routes are express routes from suburban areas to Downtown Cincinnati. Three Southwest Ohio Regional Transit Authority bus routes (28, 29X, 82X) also extend into the county with funding from CTC.

CTC was founded in 1977 as Clermont Area Rural Transit (CART).

== Routes ==
No.	Route	Description
2X	New Richmond Express	Travels twice in each direction per day, providing express service along the US 52 corridor between two park and ride lots in the suburb of New Richmond and Downtown Cincinnati. During the COVID-19 pandemic, the route has been running once daily.
4X	Amelia Express	Travels seven times per day in each direction, providing express service along the Ohio State Route 125 corridor to Downtown Cincinnati; a variety of suburban pick-up locations, including one park and ride lot, are located in Amelia, Batavia Township, Pierce Township, and Union Township.

Former routes:

- Route 1, the Felicity - Eastgate Shuttle, traveling once in each direction per day, provided a crucial link between rural Felicity and Franklin Township with both places of employment and shopping destinations in suburban Union Township. The route's final run was on September 26, 2019.
- Route 3 provided all-day local service between Milford, Goshen Township, and Miami Township, with connecting service to Downtown Cincinnati via SORTA Routes 28 and 28X.

== See also ==
- List of bus transit systems in the United States
- Southwest Ohio Regional Transit Authority (SORTA), serving Cincinnati
- Warren County Transit, serving Warren County, Ohio
