= Cincinnati Street Railway =

Public transit operator in Ohio, U.S.

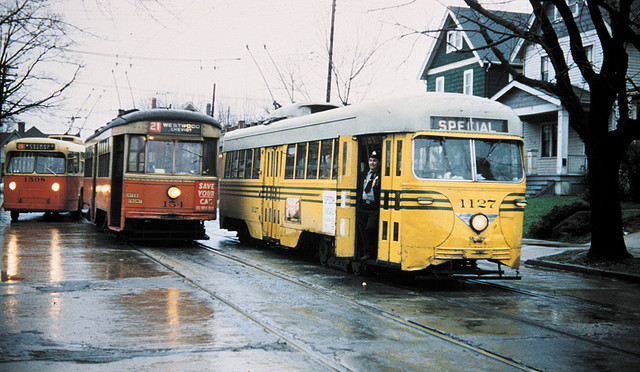
- A CSR trolley bus and two streetcars during the last month of streetcar service, in 1951

Overview
- Headquarters: Cincinnati, Ohio
- Dates of operation: 1859–1952
- Successor: Cincinnati Transit Commission

Mount Adams Incline, c. 1900

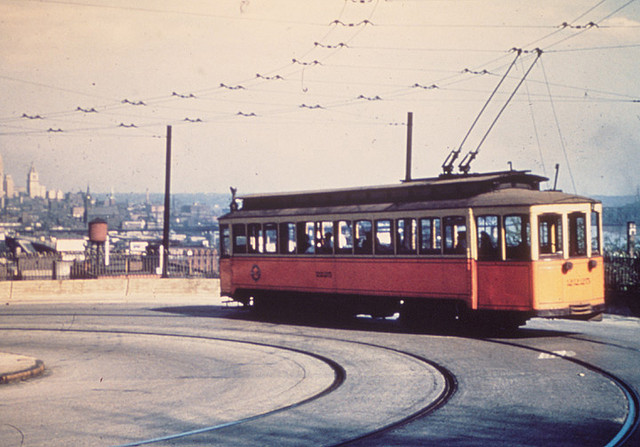
CSR's streetcars used double – instead of single – trolley poles, almost uniquely among North American streetcar systems.

Cincinnati Street Railway (CSR) was the public transit operator in Cincinnati, Ohio, from 1859 to 1952. The company ceased streetcar operations and was renamed Cincinnati Transit Company.

The company was founded in 1859 and was one of several operators. The Cincinnati Consolidated Railway merged with CSR in 1880:

- Passenger Railroad of Cincinnati 1859–1873 – merged with CCR
- Route Nine Street Railroad 1859–1873 – merged with CCR
- Pendleton Street Railroad 1860–1873 – merged with East and West Street Railroad Company and finally with CCR in 1873
- Cincinnati, Walnut Hills, Avondale and Pleasant Ridge Street Railway 1874–1880 – merged with CSR
- Storrs and Sedamsvill Street Railroad 1878–1880
- Cincinnati and Clifton Incline Plane Railroad 1876–1880
- Rees McDuffie 1884–1885
- Cumminsville Street Passenger Railroad ?-1889
- Walnut Hills and Cincinnati Street Railway 1872–1880
- Mount Adams and Eden Park Incline Railway 1876–1881
- Mount Auburn Cable Railway 1887–1896
- Mount Auburn Street Railway 1864–1873
- Cincinnati and Columbia Street Railway 1866–1896

Some of the city's streetcars, namely A9-10 PCC were sold to the Toronto Transit Commission upon abandonment.

The company began subway construction from 1920 to 1925, but the route was abandoned due to lack of money.

== Fleet ==
- Streetcars built by the Cincinnati Car Company
- PCC streetcars built by the St. Louis Car Company
- Trolley buses built by several different manufacturers, but primarily Twin Coach, the St. Louis Car Company and Marmon-Herrington

=== Preserved vehicles ===
Some former CSR vehicles have been preserved in museums. One example is car 2227, built in 1919 by the Cincinnati Car Company, at the Pennsylvania Trolley Museum. That museum acquired car 2227 from the Lake Shore Electric Railway (another museum) in 2009 and restored it, unveiling the restored car in 2013.

== See also ==
- Streetcars in Cincinnati
- Connector (Cincinnati) – streetcar system opened in 2016
