= Transit Authority of Northern Kentucky =

Public Transit System in Northern Kentucky

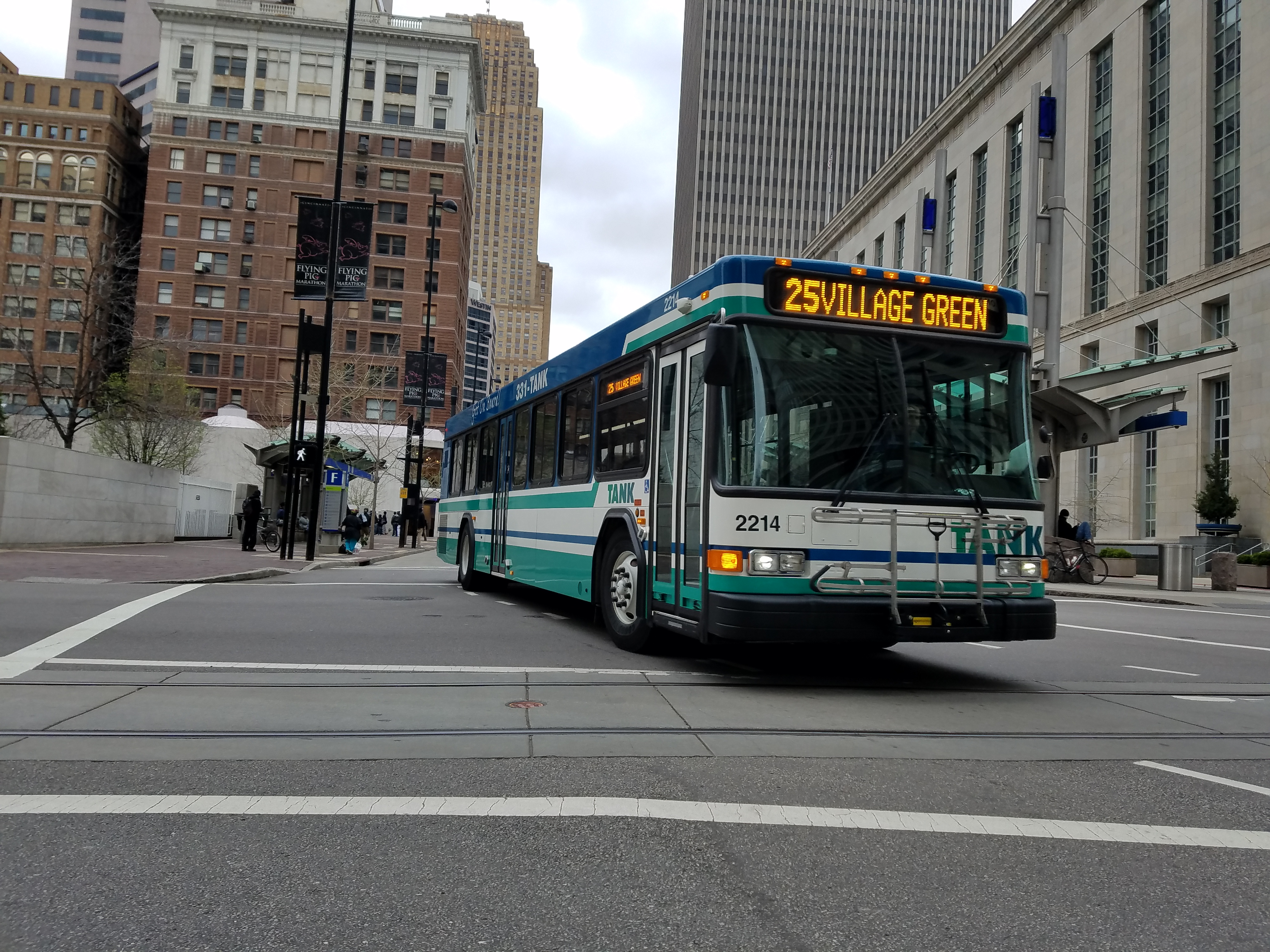
- TANK bus departing Government Square in downtown Cincinnati, 2017
- Founded: 1973
- Headquarters: 3375 Madison Pike; Fort Wright, Kentucky
- Locale: Northern Kentucky
- Service area: Boone, Kenton, Campbell counties & Downtown Cincinnati
- Service type: Bus service, paratransit
- Alliance: Southwest Ohio Regional Transit Authority
- Routes: 27
- Stops: 1,269
- Hubs: Fort Wright Hub, Florence Hub
- Stations: Covington Transit Center
- Fleet: 107 buses
- Daily ridership: 5,500< (weekdays, Q1 2026)
- Annual ridership: 1,992,200 (2025)
- Website: tankbus.org

The Transit Authority of Northern Kentucky (TANK) is the public transit system serving the Northern Kentucky suburbs of Cincinnati, Ohio, located in Kenton County, Boone County and Campbell County, United States. In 2025, the system had a ridership of 1,992,200, or about 5,500< per weekday as of the first quarter of 2026.

As of 2007, TANK operates a fleet of 100 fixed route buses and 25 demand response vehicles.

While TANK's primary service area is the three Northern Kentucky counties, all TANK routes also connect with Downtown Cincinnati where riders can transfer to vehicles operated by the Southwest Ohio Regional Transit Authority if necessary. Although the two systems are separate, the TANK and SORTA work to make transfers between systems easy and even sell a joint pass.

A bus redesign took effect on January 31, 2021.

== History ==
TANK was founded in 1973 after the privately funded Greenline Bus Company ceased operation, and voters in the three counties elected to publicly fund the transit system. ATE Management, founded by Greenline's owners, provided management. ATE and its successor First Transit provided management until 2010, when TANK became self-managed.

== Fares ==
As of 2025, TANK charges $2.00 for all fixed route service. Students in kindergarten through 12th grade on school days riding to and from school only pay $1. TANK also has passes: a 30-day pass (unlimited) for $70.

Several regional passes are offered, which are valid for unlimited rides on both TANK and Metro/Southwest Ohio Regional Transit Authority. One Day Metro/TANK for $5; 30-day Metro/TANK for $105.

== Routes ==
Number	Description
1	Dixie Hwy/Florence
2X	Airporter
3	Ludlow/Bromley
5	Holman Ave/Fort Wright
7	Madison Ave/Latonia
8	Eastern Ave/Crestview Hills
12	Bellevue/Dayton
16	West Newport/Fort Thomas
25	NKU/Alexandria
25X	Alexandria Express
30X	Lake Park Dr/Fort Wright Express
39X	Petersburg Rd/South Hebron Express
40X	Worldwide Blvd/North Hebron Express
42X	Industrial Rd/Florence Express
SS	Southbank Shuttle

== Ridership ==
Annual ridership
Year	Total unlinked passenger trips
1991	4,546,106
1992	4,501,623
1993	4,080,269
1994	4,080,015
1995	4,080,015
1996	3,710,341
1997	3,715,599
1998	3,747,643
1999	3,884,654
2000	4,615,265
2001	4,386,976
2002	4,281,789
2003	3,872,407
2004	3,709,526
2005	3,770,649
2006	3,638,815
2007	3,719,871
2008	3,804,210
2009	3,806,772
2010	3,534,695
2011	3,634,802
2012	3,635,954
2013	3,636,937
2014	3,580,867
2015	3,625,913
2016	3,553,112
2017	3,296,168
2018	3,090,565
2019	3,002,618
2020	2,471,345
2021	1,424,800
2022	1,738,000
2023	2,092,600
2024	2,090,500
2025	1,992,200

== See also ==
- List of bus transit systems in the United States
- Southwest Ohio Regional Transit Authority
