= Northern Kentucky =

Geographical region

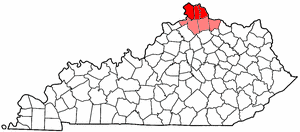
Map of Northern Kentucky, showing the three core counties of the region in red and other parts of the region in pink

Northern Kentucky (NKY) is an urban area in the U.S. Commonwealth of Kentucky consisting of the southern part of the Cincinnati metropolitan area. The three main counties of the area are Boone, Kenton, and Campbell, all along the Ohio River across from Cincinnati, Ohio. Other counties frequently included in Northern Kentucky include Bracken, Grant, Gallatin and Pendleton. Of Greater Cincinnati's over two million residents, over 450,000 of them live in Northern Kentucky as of 2020, primarily in the northernmost counties. The largest cities in the region are Covington, Florence, and Independence.

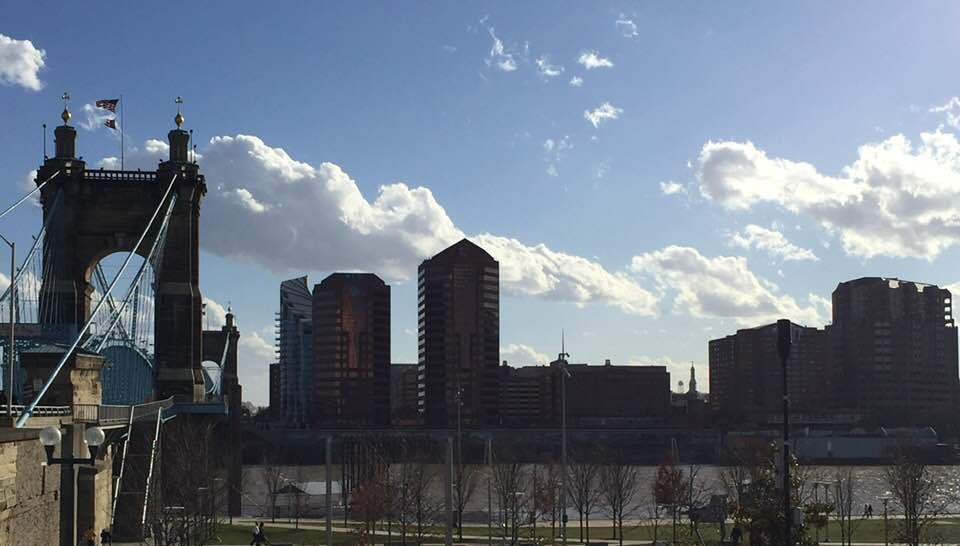
Covington skyline from Cincinnati, 2019

Historically, Carroll, Trimble, Mason, and Lewis counties have also been included in the broader definition of Northern Kentucky. On July 17, 2019, Brent Cooper, a member of the Northern Kentucky Chamber of Commerce, called for the Northern Kentucky community to consider reuniting three counties (Boone, Kenton, and Campbell) into one county to better reflect the region's common identity and strengthen its political voice and economic marketability.

== History ==
Historical population
Census	Pop.	Note	%±
1950	225,353		—
1960	261,191		15.9%
1970	282,257		8.1%
1980	302,583		7.2%
1990	315,390		4.2%
2000	362,741		15.0%
2010	425,503		17.3%
2020	454,783		6.9%
data source:

The area was served by ferry service across the Ohio River until the completion of the John A. Roebling Suspension Bridge (prototype of the famous Brooklyn Bridge) in 1866.

Beginning in the 1970s, many factors combined to create major growth. The proximity to Cincinnati, the completion of I-75, the nexus of rail service and river traffic, the creation of several industrial parks, and the growth of Cincinnati/Northern Kentucky International Airport (CVG) (located near Hebron in northeastern Boone County near the Kenton County line) drew many industries into the area. Its geographically central location (within 800 miles [1,300 km] of 80% of the US population) makes it ideal for distribution centers, and those shipping all over the country.

The primary airport (CVG) serving Cincinnati is located in Northern Kentucky.

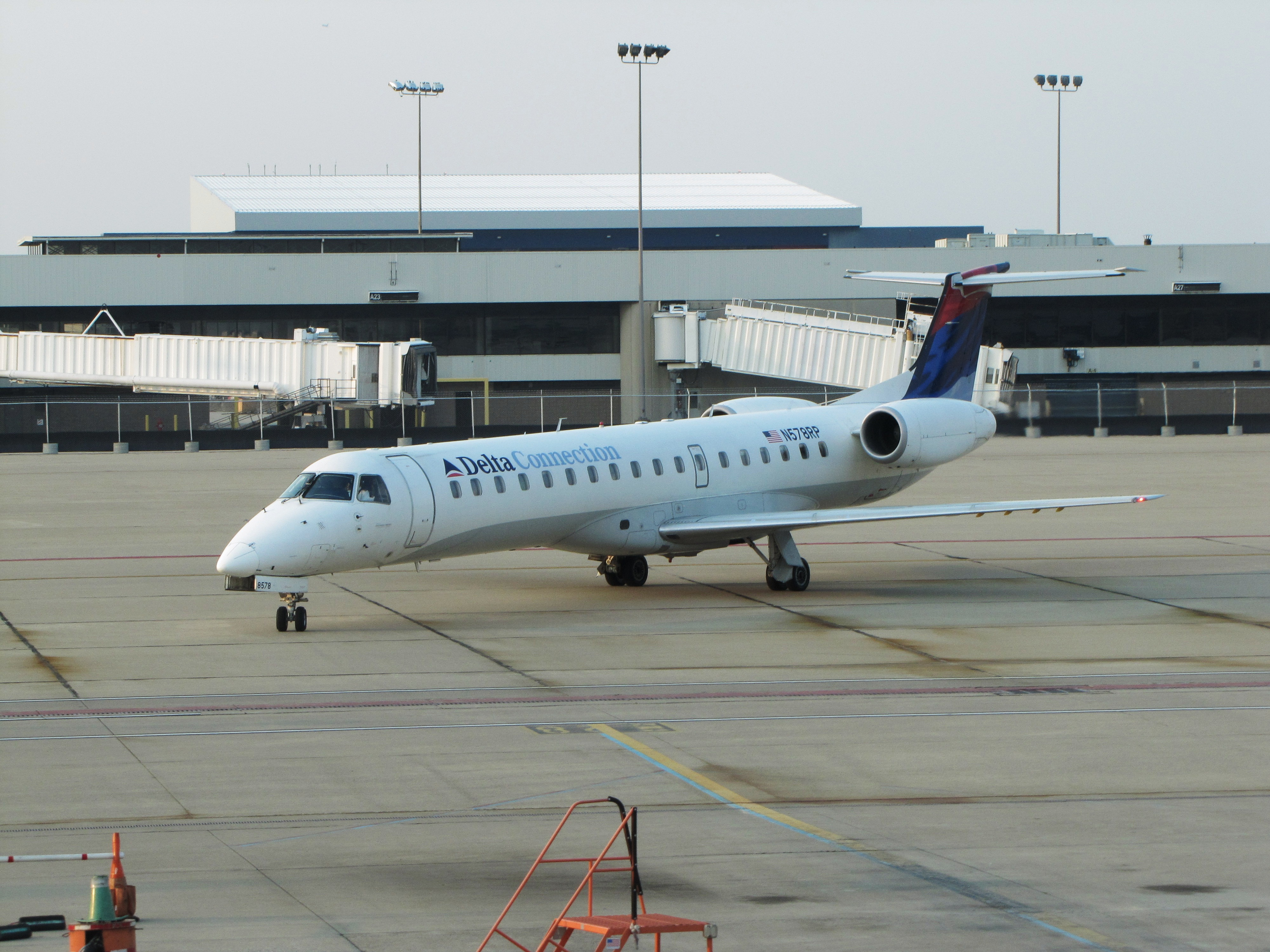
Plane at CVG-Cincinnati and Northern Kentucky's International Airport

== Climate ==
Northern Kentucky is located within a climatic transition zone and is at the extreme northern limit of the humid subtropical climate. Evidence of both humid subtropical climate and humid continental climate can be found here, particularly noticeable by the presence of plants indicative of each climatic region; for example, the southern magnolia, and crape myrtle, from the subtropics and the blue spruce, maple, and eastern hemlock from cooler regions are successful landscape plants in and around Northern Kentucky. Some significant moderating variables for the overall climate of Northern Kentucky include the Ohio River, the region's relatively large hills and valleys, and an urban heat influence due to the proximity of the Cincinnati/Northern Kentucky metropolitan area.

The common wall lizard, introduced from Italy in the 1950s, is an example of fauna in the area that lends a subtropical ambiance to areas near the urban core of Cincinnati. Even though Kentucky as a whole is firmly considered Southern and part of the Upper South. Northern Kentucky is considered to be within the periphery of the Upper South and Midwest.

== Attractions ==
Northern Kentucky contributes many attractions to the Greater Cincinnati community. Beyond the shops, restaurants, and riverside views of Cincinnati's skyline, some of the more well-known attractions are The Florence Speedway, MainStrasse Village, Newport on the Levee (including the Newport Aquarium), and the World Peace Bell. There are also several community playhouses and music venues, along with community parks, arboretums, and museums. Campbell County has some wineries.

Religious attractions of Northern Kentucky range from the historic churches of the older river cities, including the St. Mary's Cathedral Basilica of the Assumption and Mother of God Church, both in Covington, to the Ark Encounter in Williamstown, south in Grant County. Florence is home to the Islamic Center of Northern Kentucky.

== Education ==
Northern Kentucky has several school county school districts, including Kenton County, Boone County, and Campbell County. There are also numerous independent school districts, including Covington Independent and Ft Thomas Schools. Christian education is provided by the Diocese of Covington.

Northern Kentucky has several schools of higher education, including Gateway Community and Technical College, Northern Kentucky University, and Thomas More University.

== Politics ==
1992 presidential election results in Kentucky

2024 presidential election results in Kentucky

With the exception of liberal cities such as Covington and Newport, Northern Kentucky is largely considered a Republican stronghold, along with the rest of Kentucky. Before the 2000s, Kentucky was historically a Democratic stronghold, or split evenly.

2020 U.S. House election results by district

Northern Kentucky has also voted Republican in House and Senate elections. However, Kentucky famously has a Democratic governor.

Northern Kentucky is fully part of Congressional District 4. District 4 is represented by Thomas Massie in the House. District 4 was home to the most expensive U.S. House primary in American history, where over $32 million was spent to defeat Massie. Kentucky's congressional districts are not considered to be gerrymandered.

Voter turnout in Northern Kentucky has increased since the 2000s.

Northern Kentucky presidential election results
Year	Democratic	Republican	Third parties
2024	33.5% 75,029	64.4% 144,017	2% 4,389
2020	34.6% 77,695	63.3% 142,018	2% 4,509
2016	30.5% 58,426	64.8% 124,116	4.5% 8,777
2012	34.6% 62,683	63.3% 114,558	2% 3,586
2008	36.6% 66,052	61.8% 111,664	1.5% 2,716
2004	32.5% 56,637	66.6% 115,761	0.87% 1,514
2000	33.7% 46,563	64.4% 89,027	1.8% 2,563
1996	37.2% 46,454	54% 67,387	8.6% 10,777
1992	31.8% 39,798	49.4% 61,748	18.6% 23,329

== Transportation ==
Public transit needs in Northern Kentucky are fulfilled by the Transit Authority of Northern Kentucky (TANK). TANK operates 27 routes, and has a fleet of 130+ buses.

CVG is the region's main airport. The "C" in CVG actually stands for Covington and not Cincinnati.

The region is served by multiple interstate highways: I-75, I-71, I-275, I-471
