= Taylor's Daughters Historic District =

- U.S. National Register of Historic Places
- U.S. Historic district
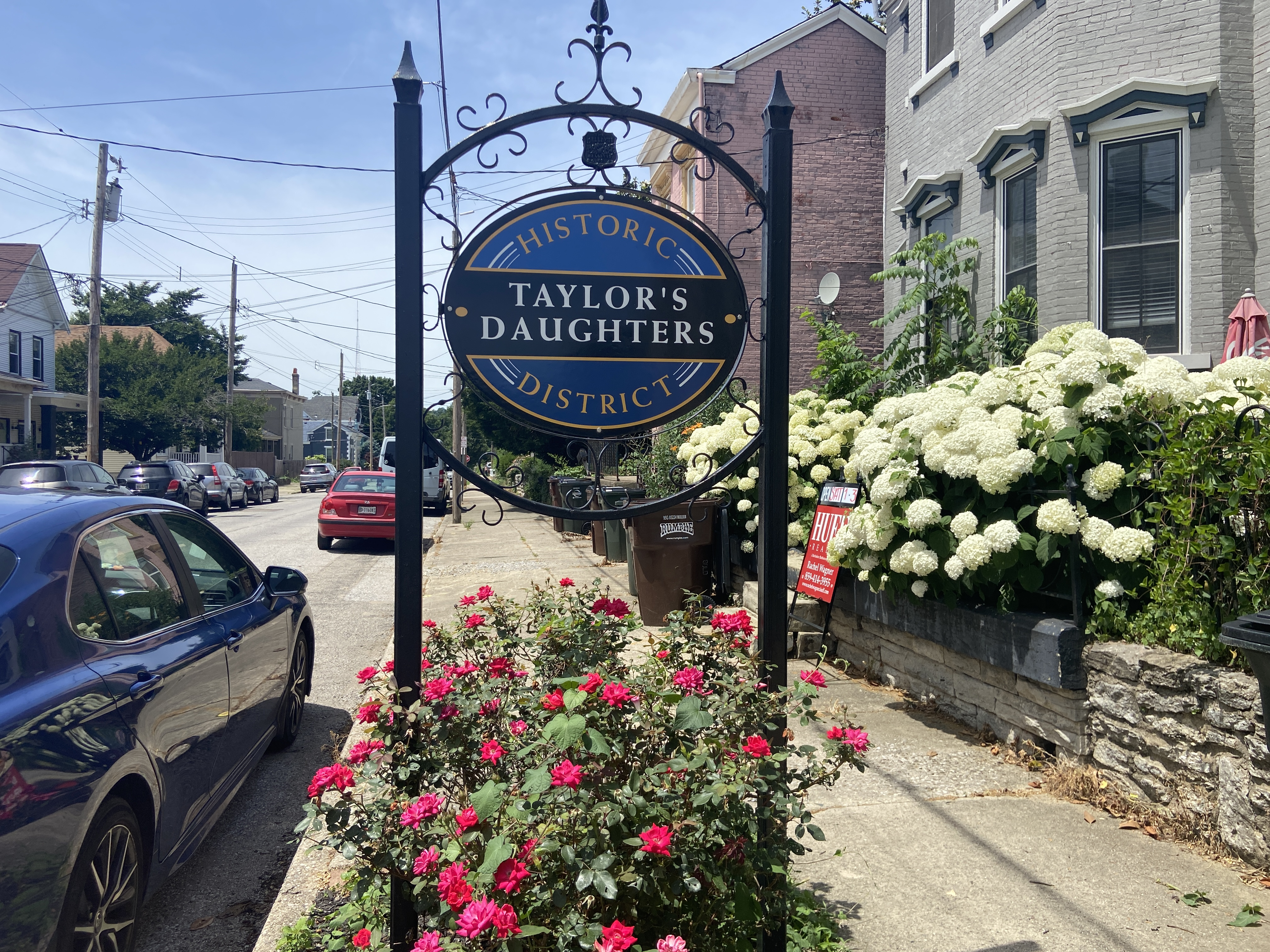
- Sign marking Taylor's Daughters Historic District
- Location: Bellevue, Kentucky
- Coordinates: 39.103056°N 84.479722°W
- Area: 150 acres (61 ha).
- Architectural style: Bungalow, Late Victorian
- NRHP reference No.: 88000101
- Added to NRHP: February 24, 1988

Taylor's Daughters Historic District is a historical district listed in the National Register of Historic Places located in the center of Bellevue, Kentucky. It is one of Northern Kentucky's largest and best-preserved areas and also one of the largest concentrations of historical buildings in Kentucky.

Its name comes from General James Taylor, the founder of Bellevue, who also named many other streets in the town after his daughters and granddaughters. The area includes 1165 buildings that were mostly built between c. 1885 and 1910. and is South of the Fairfield Avenue Historic District and North of the Bonnie Leslie Historic District.

== District landmarks ==
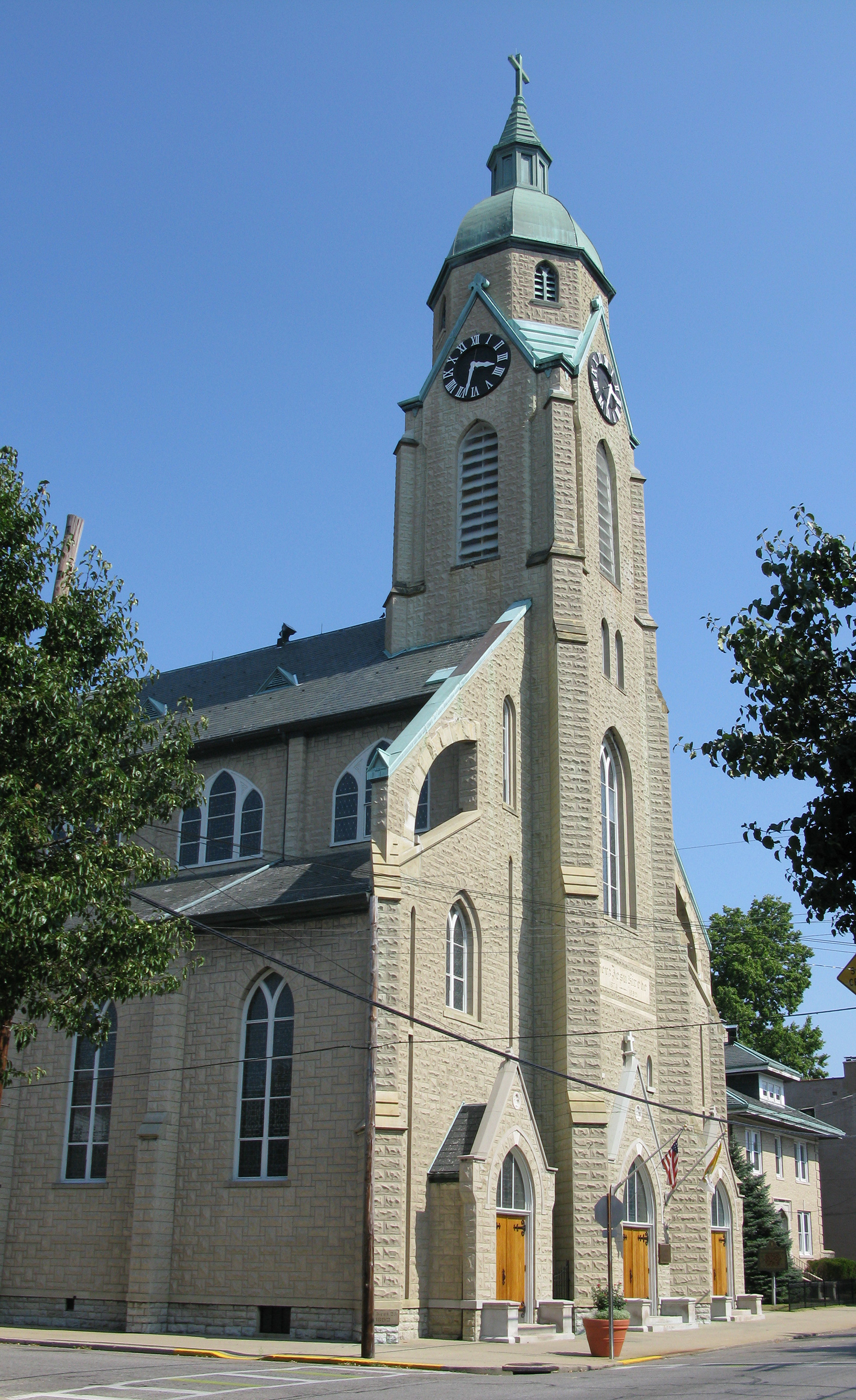
Sacred Heart Church

=== Sacred Heart Church ===
Sacred Heart Church, also known as Herz Jesu Kirche, is a historical church built in 1892 that was added to the National Register of Historic Places in 1974. It was designed after Bavarian churches by Cincinnati architect Louis Pickett and is located at the corner of Taylor and Division street.

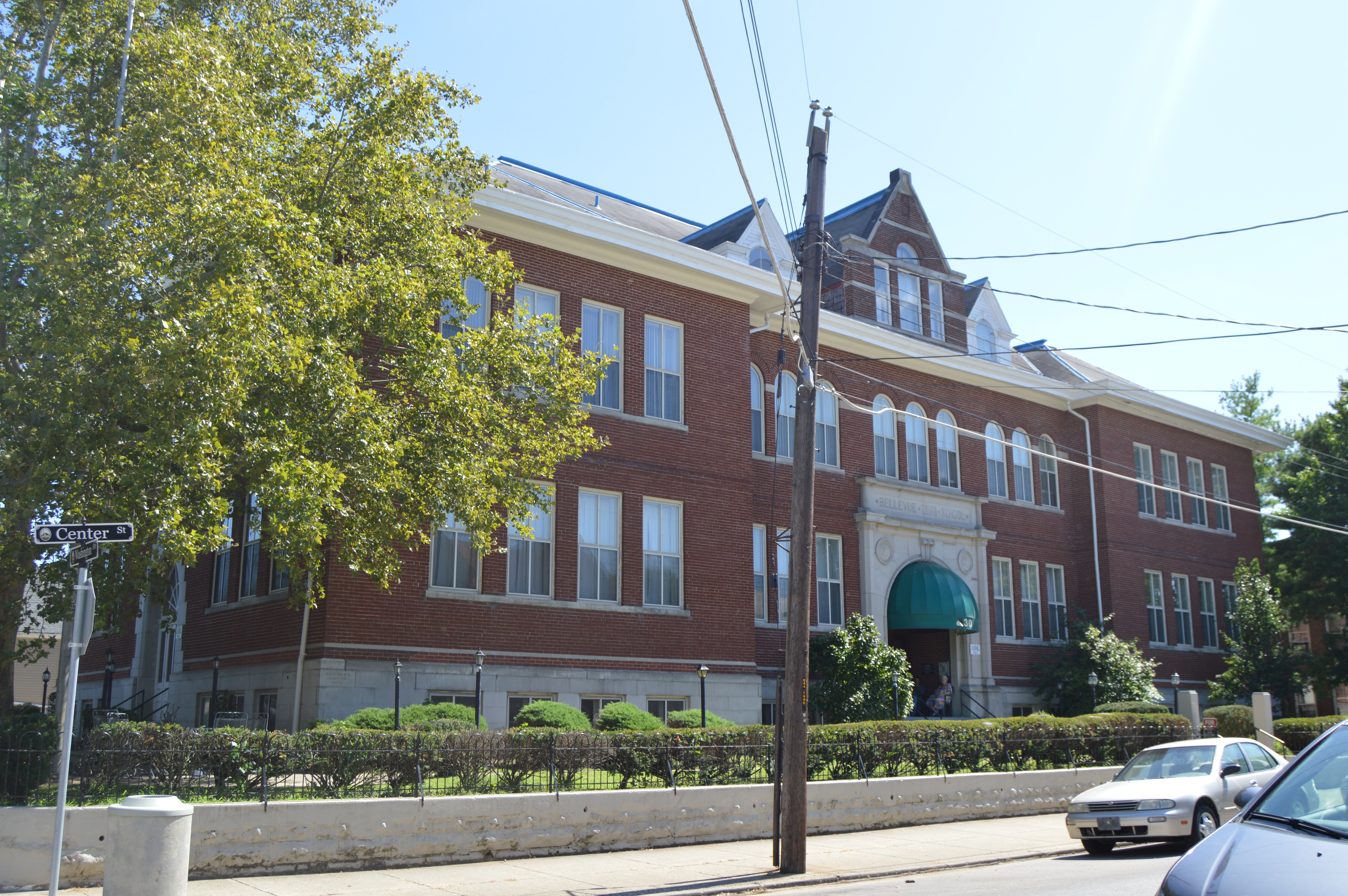
The Bellevue School Haus

=== Bellevue School Haus ===
Bellevue School Haus is Bellevue's oldest unaltered building, located at the corner of Washington and Center Street. Built in 1905, the School Haus incorporates elements of the Renaissance and Classical revivals and was designed by W. E. Bausmith and C. C. Webe. The site was added to the National Register of Historic Places in 1986. It served as the previous High School for Bellevue.

=== Bellevue High School ===
The present Bellevue High School was built in 1933 and is located at the corner of Center and Lafayette. It was designed by E. C. Landberg in Collegiate Tudor style.
