= George Taylor (Virginia politician) =

American politician (1710–1792)

Member of the Virginia House of Burgesses
- In office 1748–1758 Serving with Benjamin Cave
- Constituency: Orange County

Personal details
- Born: February 10, 1710 Orange County, Colony of Virginia, British America
- Died: November 4, 1792 (aged 82)
- Spouse(s): Rachel Gibson (died) Sarah Taliaferro Conway
- Children: 14
- Parent: James Taylor (father)
- Relatives: Richard Taylor (nephew); Zachary Taylor (grand nephew); James Madison (grand nephew); James Taylor Jr. (grand nephew); Edmund H. Taylor Jr. (great-great-grandson); John Penn
- Occupation: Politician

George Taylor (February 10, 1710 – November 4, 1792) was an American politician and militia officer from Virginia. He served in the Virginia House of Burgesses from 1748 to 1758.

== Early life ==
George Taylor was born on February 10, 1710, in Orange County, Virginia, to Martha (Thompson) and James Taylor. His father was a member of the Virginia House of Burgesses. His nephews were Richard Taylor and Hancock Taylor. His grand nephews were Zachary Taylor, James Madison, and James Taylor Jr.

== Career ==
Taylor was appointed deputy clerk of Orange County in 1749. He was appointed clerk in 1750. He remained in the role until he was succeeded by his son James in 1772.

Taylor was appointed colonel of the Orange County militia by Governor Robert Dinwiddie during the French and Indian War. He was a member of the Orange County Committee of Safety during the American Revolutionary War.

Taylor served in the Virginia House of Burgesses, representing Orange County, from 1748 to 1758. He was a member of the Virginia Convention of 1775.

== Personal life ==
Taylor married Rachel Gibson, daughter of Jonathan Gibson. They had 11 sons: James, George, Jonathan, Edmund, Francis, Richard, John, William, Charles, Reuben, and Benjamin. All of his sons served in the Revolutionary War except for George, who died in 1761. After his wife Rachel died, Taylor married Sarah (née Taliaferro) Conway. They had one son, Charles Conway. He had as many as 14 sons, in total. According to other sources, only seven of his sons served in the Revolutionary War. His great-great-grandson was Edmund H. Taylor Jr. He was also an ancestor of John Penn.

Taylor's home was called Midland. He died on November 4, 1792.
