= Taylor Park (disambiguation) =

Taylor Park may refer to:

== In the United States ==
- Taylor Park Reservoir, Colorado
- General James Taylor Park, Kentucky
- Pete Taylor Park, Mississippi

== Elsewhere ==
- Taylor Park, England
- Fred Taylor Park, New Zealand

== See also ==
- Samuel P. Taylor State Park, California
