= Bellevue, Kentucky =

- City
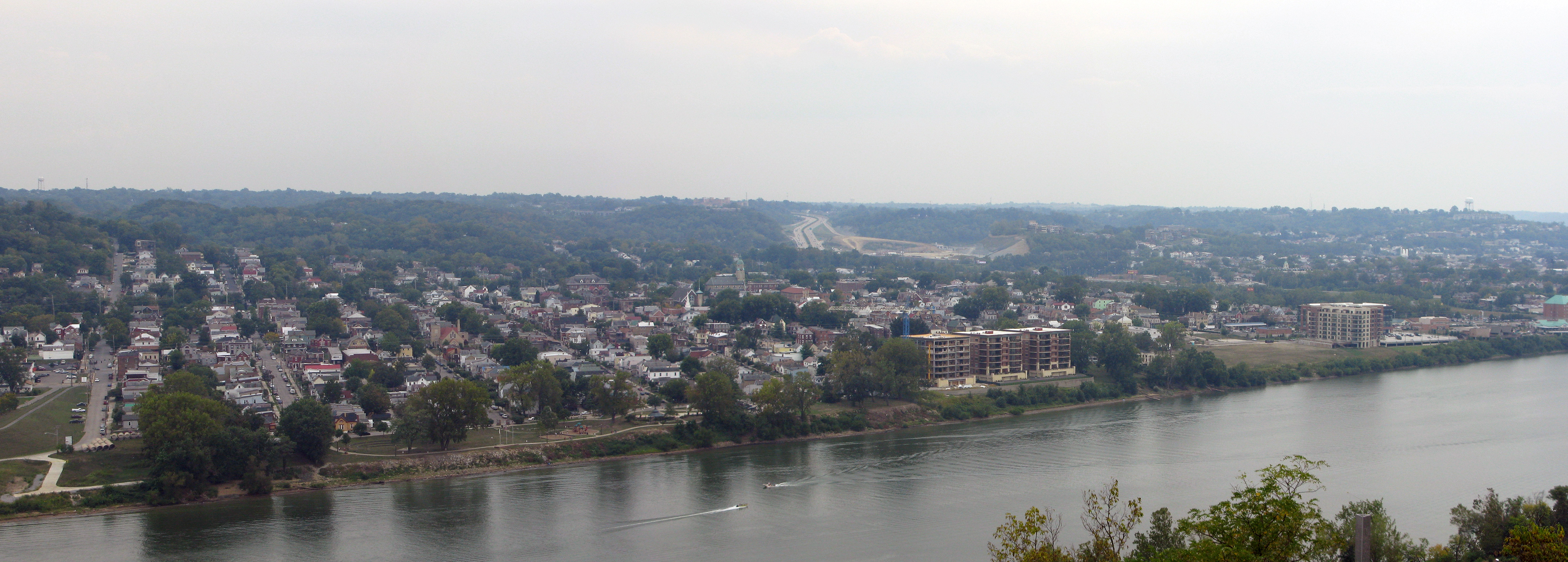

- Flag Logo
- Motto: "Preserving the Past, preparing for the Future"
- Location of Bellevue in Campbell County, Kentucky.
- Coordinates: 39°06′04″N 84°28′39″W
- Country: United States
- State: Kentucky
- County: Campbell

Government
  - Type: Mayor/Council
  - Mayor: Charlie Cleves

Area
  - Total: 0.90 sq mi (2.34 km^{2})
  - Land: 0.90 sq mi (2.34 km^{2})
  - Water: 0 sq mi (0.00 km^{2})
- Elevation: 568 ft (173 m)

Population (2020)
  - Total: 5,548
  - Estimate (2024): 5,738
  - Density: 6,127.8/sq mi (2,365.97/km^{2})
- Time zone: UTC-5 (Eastern (EST))
  - Summer (DST): UTC-4 (EDT)
- ZIP codes: 41073-41074
- Area code: 859
- FIPS code: 21-05446
- GNIS feature ID: 2403846
- Website: www.bellevueky.org

Bellevue is a home rule-class city in Campbell County, Kentucky, in the United States. It is located along the southern bank of the Ohio River. The population was 5,548 at the 2020 census.

== History ==
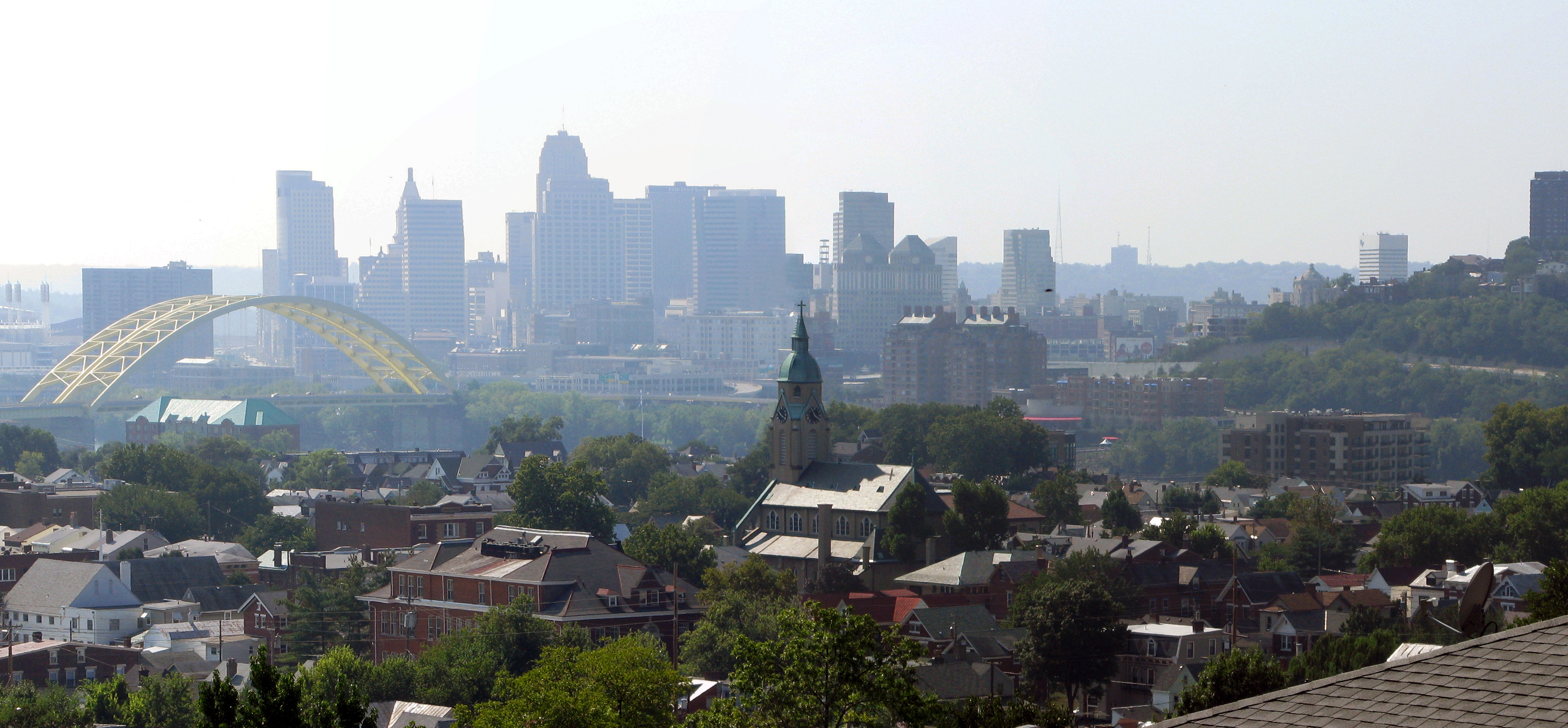
Bellevue is 3 miles (4.8 km) from Downtown Cincinnati.

Before Bellevue was founded, the area was used for hunting, fishing, and warfare by Native Americans tribes such as the Illini, Miami, Shawnee, Cherokee, and Tuscarora. In 1745, a three-day battle occurred in Bellevue among the Shawnee, Miami, and Cherokee Indians, resulting in many deaths.

Bellevue was named for the plantation of Gen. James Taylor Jr., Quartermaster General of the western U.S. Army in the War of 1812. The city was once the eastern part of his plantation. The name Bellevue was taken from the General's family plantation in Virginia. Bellevue, or "belle vue," translates from French to mean "beautiful view." James Taylor Jr. was the fifth child born to James Taylor Sr. and his wife, Anne Hubbard Taylor, in 'Midway', Caroline County, Virginia. His father bought 2,700 acres (11 km^{2}) of land in Northern Kentucky from his friend George Muse, part of which Muse had been awarded for his military service in the French and Indian War. James Taylor Jr. was one of the wealthiest men in the state of Kentucky. In 1848, his estate was valued at more than $4 million. Today, his home stands in the East Row local Historic District in the adjoining City of Newport, Kentucky. East Row is the second-largest local district in Kentucky, and the Taylor Mansion is the district's oldest house.

The city was formally incorporated by act of the state assembly in 1870. Although it contained only 381 inhabitants in 1870, by 1877, Bellevue was reported to be "growing fast".

By the 1890s, Bellevue was bustling. Balke's Opera House at Berry and Fairfield Avenues served as the town hall and firehouse. A city directory listed 15 grocery stores, four bakeries, six boot makers, seven confectioneries, two livery stables, a blacksmith, three millionaries, six doctors, seven saloons, and a wagon manufacturer.

Throughout Bellevue's history, Fairfield Avenue has been the city's primary business area. In 1894, Bellevue city fathers, attempting to bring more settlers to the city, published a brochure describing the avenue's commercial quality: "Fairfield Avenue, running east and west through the entire town, is the principal business thoroughfare, and business houses are kept well stocked with the latest and best of everything in all branches of trade.

The Taylor's Daughters Historic District is the local historic district.

At the turn of the 20th century, Bellevue, like Dayton, was known for its white sandy beaches. A resort called Queen City Beach opened in the summer of 1902 and extended from Washington Avenue to the Dayton city line. At its time it was considered one of the largest inland bathing resorts in the country. A 150 foot veranda hosted lockers, rowboats, skiffs, and sailboats for rental. The number of visitors to the beach decreased due to sewage and industrial dumping in the Ohio River. The beaches vanished after a series of dams and locks raised the level of the Ohio River. In the 1920s Queen City Beach was renamed "Riviera Beach" and then "Horseshoe Gardens" in 1930. The resort stayed open as a dance club and rented boats, but a series of floods caused severe damage. As of 2008 Bellevue Beach Park marks the location of where the Queen City Beach resort once sat.

Bellevue is becoming the bedroom community of Northern Kentucky, while its neighboring cities—Covington and Newport— are becoming the business and entertainment centers. Between 2005 and 2006, the average residential sale price increased by 89 percent, surpassing the market average of every other neighborhood in the Greater Cincinnati area.

== Geography ==
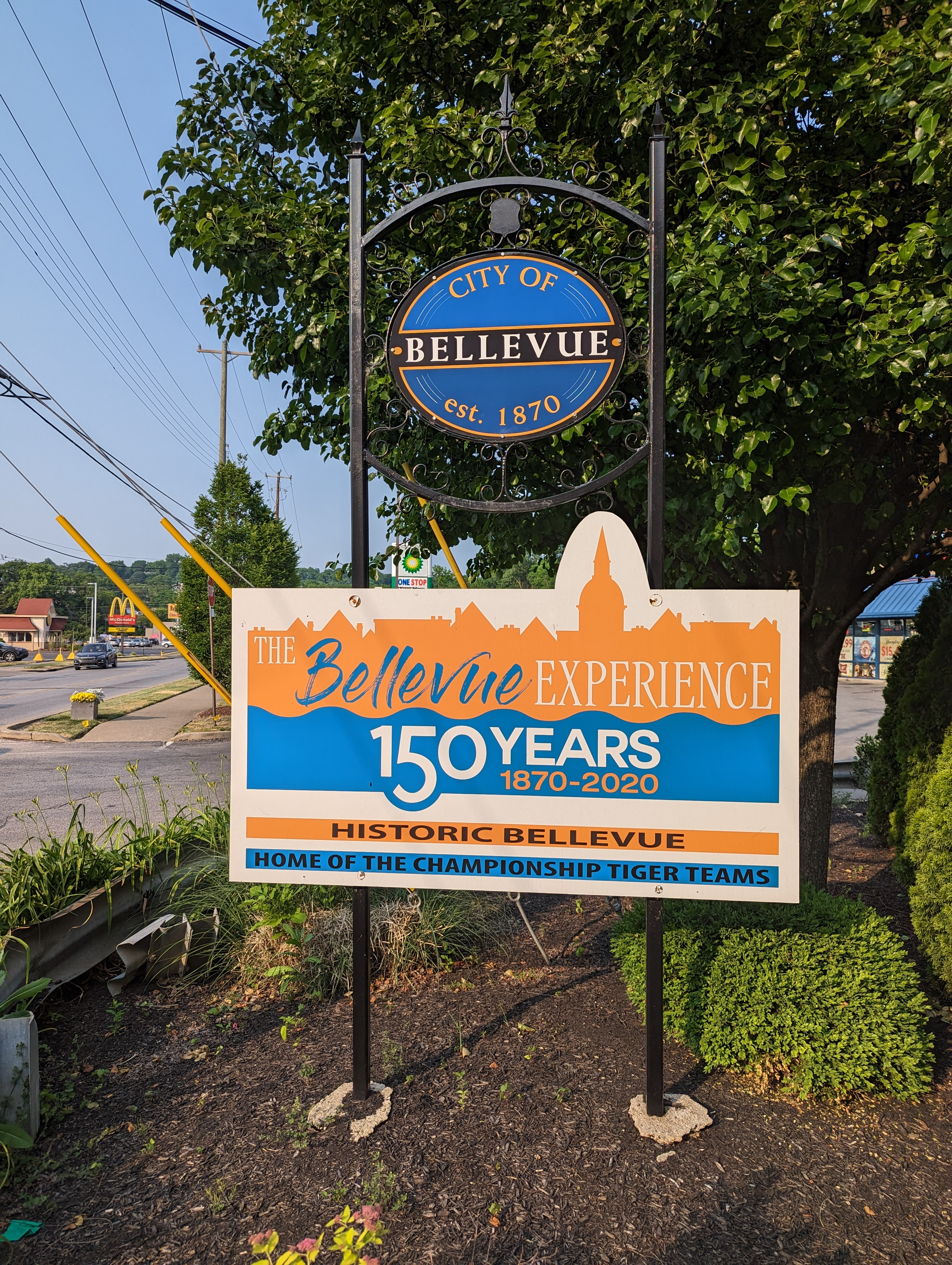
The Bellevue Gateway on Donnermeyer Drive.

Bellevue is located in Northern Kentucky, directly across the Ohio River from the Mount Adams neighborhood of Cincinnati, Ohio. The city is bordered by Newport to the west, Dayton to the east, Fort Thomas to the south, and the Ohio River and Cincinnati to the north. According to the United States Census Bureau, the city has a total area of 0.9 square miles (2.3 km^{2}), virtually all land.

Bellevue is on a gentle slope that rises toward the Kentucky Highlands region south of the city. Topographically, Bellevue is higher in elevation than its neighboring cities. When the Ohio River would rise, homes in Dayton and Newport would flood while homes in Bellevue (with the exception of homes in proximity to the riverbank) remained safe from rising water. For this reason, Bellevue is not protected by a levee, whereas Dayton and Newport are.

== Demographics ==
Historical population
Census	Pop.	Note	%±
1880	1,460		—
1890	3,163		116.6%
1900	6,332		100.2%
1910	6,683		5.5%
1920	7,379		10.4%
1930	8,497		15.2%
1940	8,741		2.9%
1950	9,040		3.4%
1960	9,336		3.3%
1970	8,847		−5.2%
1980	7,678		−13.2%
1990	6,997		−8.9%
2000	6,480		−7.4%
2010	5,955		−8.1%
2020	5,548		−6.8%
2024 (est.)	5,738		3.4%
U.S. Decennial Census

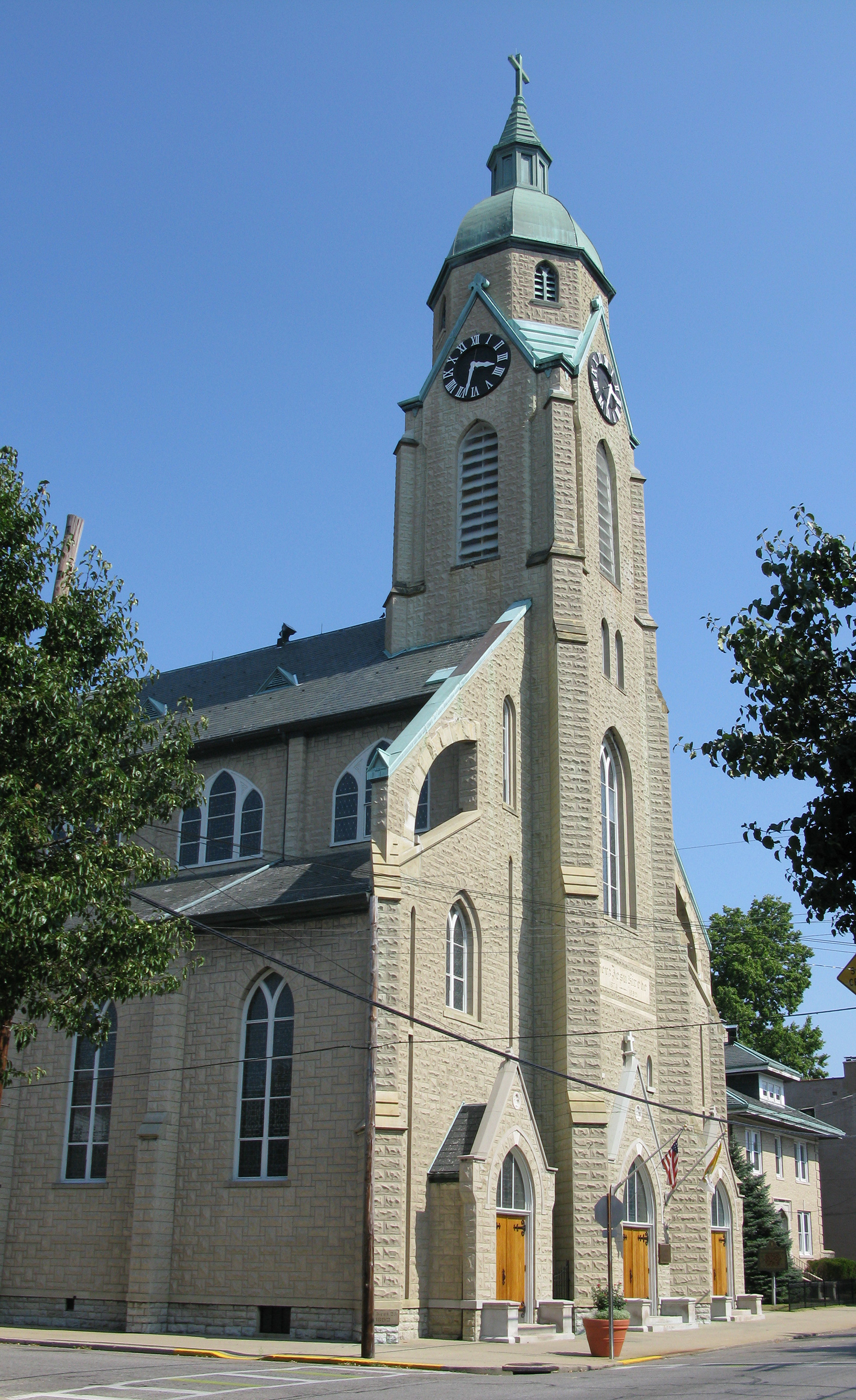
Sacred Heart Church, built in 1892, has long been one of Bellevue's tallest structures. The church is pictured in the city's official logo.

=== 2020 census ===
As of the 2020 census, Bellevue had a population of 5,548. The median age was 38.8 years. 16.2% of residents were under the age of 18 and 16.0% of residents were 65 years of age or older. For every 100 females there were 96.8 males, and for every 100 females age 18 and over there were 96.2 males age 18 and over.

100.0% of residents lived in urban areas, while 0.0% lived in rural areas.

There were 2,685 households in Bellevue, of which 20.2% had children under the age of 18 living in them. Of all households, 34.0% were married-couple households, 23.9% were households with a male householder and no spouse or partner present, and 32.8% were households with a female householder and no spouse or partner present. About 40.5% of all households were made up of individuals and 12.3% had someone living alone who was 65 years of age or older.

There were 2,948 housing units, of which 8.9% were vacant. The homeowner vacancy rate was 2.1% and the rental vacancy rate was 7.2%.

Racial composition as of the 2020 census
Race	Number	Percent
White	5,075	91.5%
Black or African American	93	1.7%
American Indian and Alaska Native	11	0.2%
Asian	30	0.5%
Native Hawaiian and Other Pacific Islander	2	0.0%
Some other race	61	1.1%
Two or more races	276	5.0%
Hispanic or Latino (of any race)	155	2.8%

=== 2010 census ===
As of the census of 2010, there were 5,955 people, 2,644 households, and 1,428 families residing in the city. The population density was 6,903.6 inhabitants per square mile (2,665.5/km^{2}). There were 2,936 housing units at an average density of 3,127.9 per square mile (1,207.7/km^{2}). The racial makeup of the city was 96% White, 1.1% African American, 0.2% Native American, 0.7% Asian, 0.7% from other races, and 1.4% from two or more races. Hispanic or Latino of any race were 2.3% of the population.

There were 2,644 households, out of which 21.6% had children under the age of 18 living with them, 35.3% were married couples living together, 12.3% had a female householder with no husband present, and 46% were non-families. 36.8% of all households were made up of individuals, and 10.6% had someone living alone who was 65 years of age or older. The average household size was 2.25 and the average family size was 3.01.

In the city, the population was spread out, with 21.2% under the age of 18, 7.5% from 18 to 24, 30.9% from 25 to 44, 27.2% from 45 to 64, and 12.5% who were 65 years of age or older. The median age was 37.5 years. For every 100 females, there were 92.1 males. For every 100 females age 18 and over, there were 88.0 males.

=== Income and poverty ===
The median income for a household in the city was $36,550, and the median income for a family was $46,800. Males had a median income of $32,381 versus $26,606 for females. The per capita income for the city was $17,983. About 7.9% of families and 10.2% of the population were below the poverty line, including 15.1% of those under age 18 and 9.7% of those age 65 or over.

== Education ==
Schools in Bellevue belong to Bellevue Independent School District. There are two schools in the district, Grandview Elementary and Bellevue High School.

For the 2011 to 2012 school year, there were approximately 783 students enrolled.

== Notable people ==
- Edward Blau, physician
- Harlan Hubbard, artist
- Eddie Hunter, baseball player
- Virginia Weiffenbach Kettering, philanthropist
- Art Mergenthal, football player
- Harry Steinfeldt, baseball player

== See also ==
- List of cities and towns along the Ohio River
