= Art Mergenthal =

American football player (1921–2001)

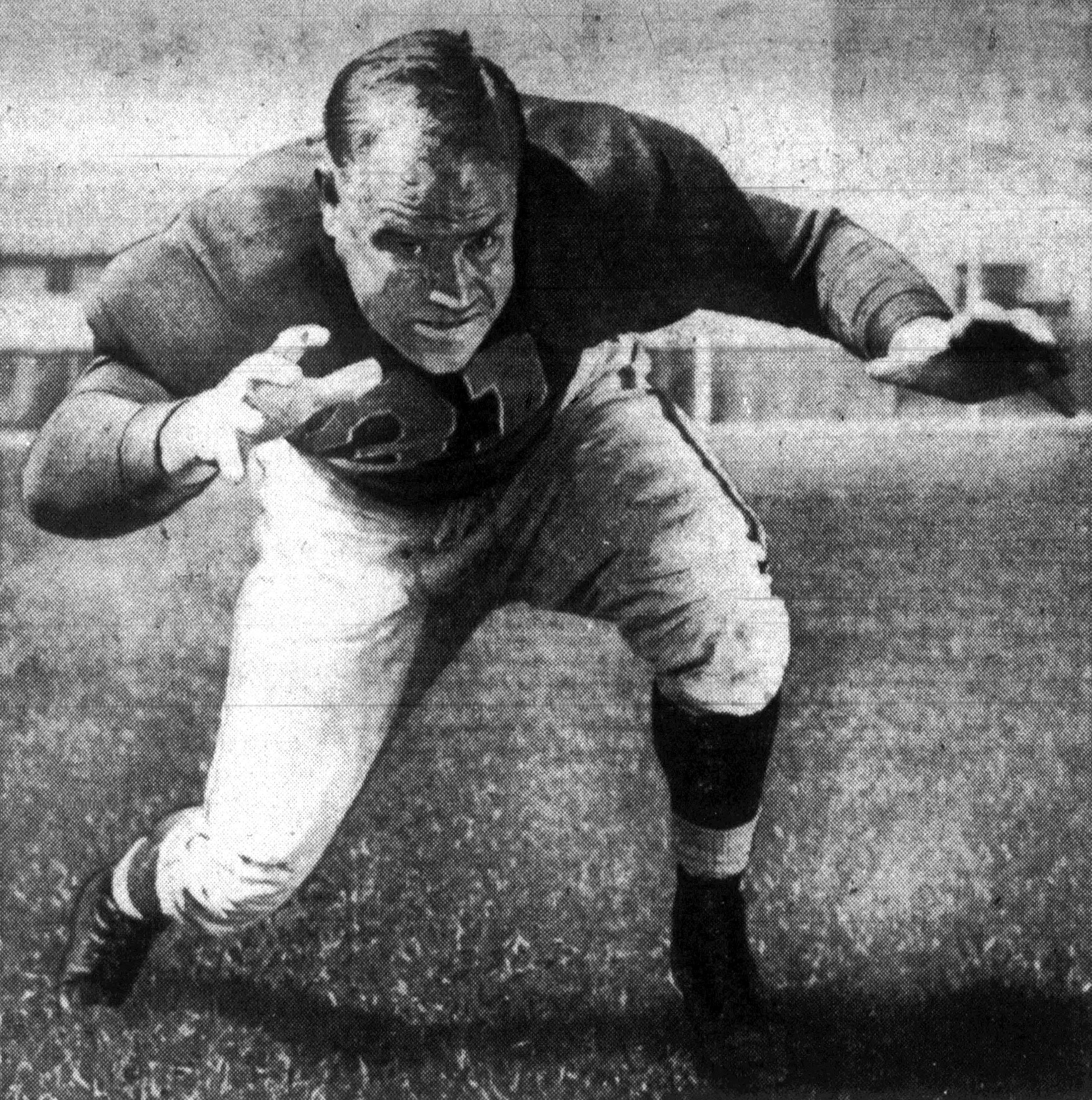
- Mergenthal, circa 1946

No. 31
- Position: Guard

Personal information
- Born: March 22, 1921; Bellevue, Kentucky, U.S.
- Died: May 20, 2001 (aged 80); Bellevue, Kentucky, U.S.
- Listed height: 5 ft 11 in (1.80 m)
- Listed weight: 215 lb (98 kg)

Career information
- High school: St. Xavier (Cincinnati, Ohio)
- College: Tennessee, Xavier, Bowling Green, Notre Dame

Career history
- Cleveland/Los Angeles Rams (1945–1946)

Awards and highlights
- NFL champion (1945)
- Stats at Pro Football Reference

Arthur Louis Mergenthal (March 22, 1921 – May 20, 2001) was an American football guard who played two seasons with the Cleveland/Los Angeles Rams of the National Football League (NFL). He played college football at the University of Tennessee, Xavier University, Bowling Green State University and lastly the University of Notre Dame.

== Early life ==
Mergenthal earned All No. KY, All-Conference and All-State honors in football at Bellevue High School. He also participated in track and field for four years. He was inducted into the Bellevue Athletic Hall of Fame in 2005. Mergenthal graduated from St. Xavier High School in 1939.

== College career ==
Mergenthal first played college football for the Tennessee Volunteers before playing for the Xavier Musketeers, Bowling Green Falcons, and the Notre Dame Fighting Irish.

== Professional career ==
Mergenthal played in 19 games, starting three, for the Cleveland/Los Angeles Rams of the NFL from 1945 to 1946. In 1947 the Philadelphia Eagles traded Mel Bleeker to the Rams for Mergenthal.

== Personal life ==
Mergenthal was a principal in the Bellevue School system for over 30 years.
