= Mel Bleeker =

American football player (1920–1996)

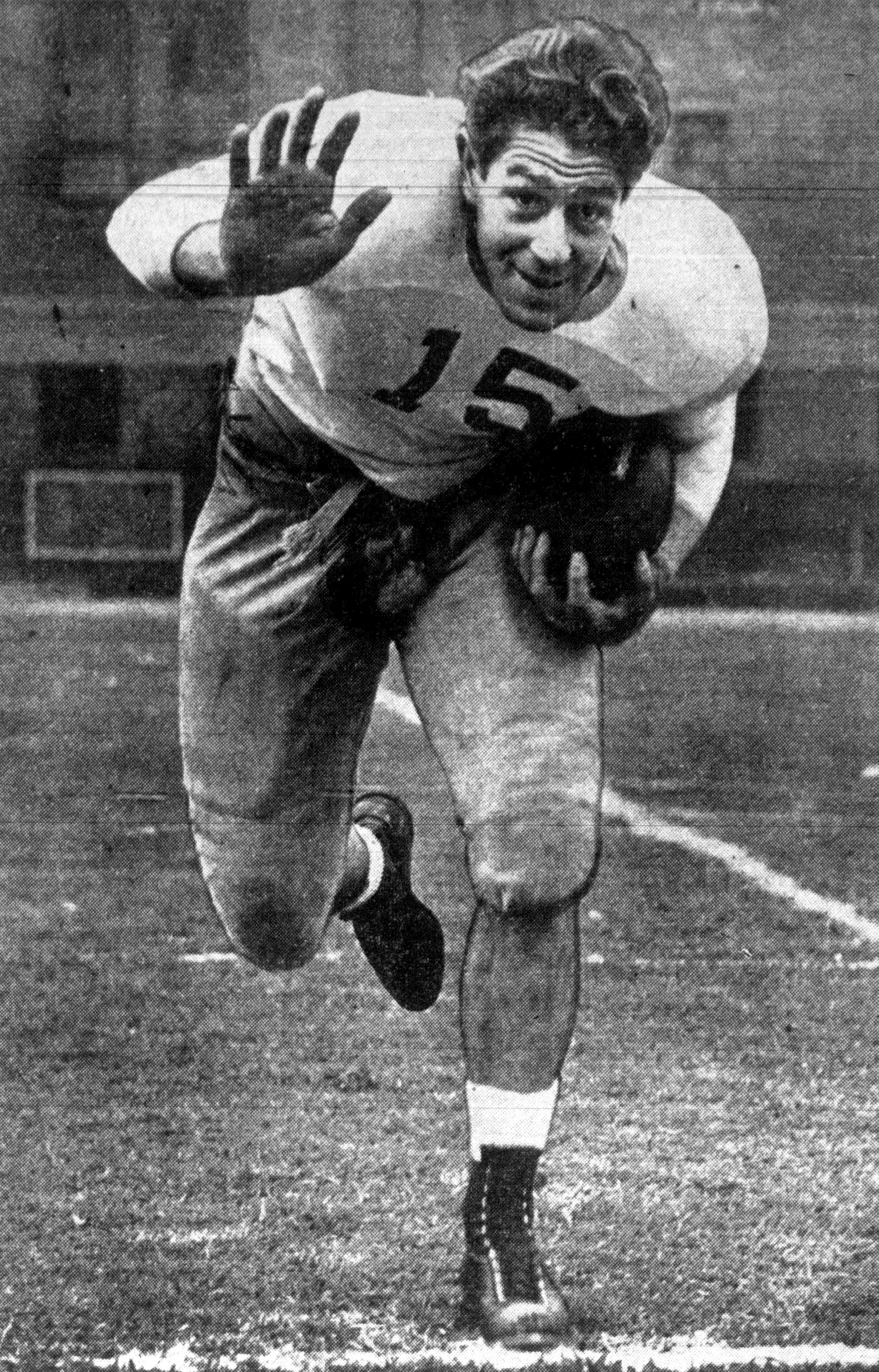
- Bleeker, circa 1942

No. 49, 34
- Position: Halfback

Personal information
- Born: August 20, 1920; Los Angeles, California, U.S.
- Died: April 24, 1996 (aged 75)

Career information
- High school: John C. Fremont (Los Angeles)
- College: USC

Career history
- Philadelphia Eagles (1944–1946); Los Angeles Rams (1947)

Career statistics
- Rushing attempts-yards: 139-586
- Receptions-yards: 14-360
- Touchdowns: 11

Melvin Wallace Bleeker (August 20, 1920 – April 24, 1996) was an American professional football player who played halfback for four seasons in the National Football League for the Philadelphia Eagles and Los Angeles Rams.

== Early life ==
Bleeker was born and raised in Los Angeles, California, and was Jewish. He attended John C. Fremont High School. In 1938, playing football for Fremont, he was named All-Southern California High School Football First-team, and All-Southern California High School Track and Field Honor Roll.

== College ==
He then attended the University of Southern California. For USC, he competed for the Trojans in both football from 1940 to 1942, as quarterback, halfback, and fullback, and for the track team in the broad jump, for whom he won the Conference championship in 1941 and took second place in the 1942 NCAA Track and Field Championships (23-11½). He also served in the United States Army.

== Football career ==
In 1943 Bleeker played for the Los Angeles Bulldogs in the Pacific Coast Professional Football League (PCFL).

He broke into the National Football League and was the NFL's top receiver in his rookie year of 1944, as Bleeker played 9 games for the Philadelphia Eagles, starting three of them. That season, he was second in the NFL in long reception (75), third in touchdowns (8; still the team's all-time rookie record) and yards/rushing attempt (5.3), fourth in yards from scrimmage (614), and sixth in points scored (48). That season he led the Eagles in touchdowns and scoring, despite having been primarily a blocking back in college.

He played two more seasons for the Eagles. In 1947 the Eagles traded Bleeker to the Los Angeles Rams for Art Mergenthal.

In 2014 he was inducted into the Southern California Jewish Sports Hall of Fame.
