= James Taylor (Virginia politician) =

American politician (1670–1729)

James Taylor Jr.

Member of the Virginia House of Burgesses
- In office 1702–1714

Personal details
- Born: March 14, 1670
- Died: June 23, 1729 (aged 59)
- Spouse: Mary Thompson
- Children: 9, including George
- Relatives: James Madison Sr. (grandson); Richard Taylor (grandson); James Madison (great-grandson); Zachary Taylor (great-grandson); James Taylor V (great-grandson); Edmund H. Taylor Jr. (great-great-great-grandson)
- Occupation: Politician; surveyor; militia officer

James Taylor Jr. (March 14, 1670 – June 23, 1729) was an American politician and surveyor from Virginia. He served as a member of the Virginia House of Burgesses.

== Early life ==
James Taylor Jr. was born on March 14, 1670, as the oldest son of Frances and James Taylor. His father emigrated from England and settled on 1,000 acres (400 ha) in what is now New Kent County, Virginia, in 1668.

== Career ==
Taylor surveyed land in Hanover, Spotsylvania, and Orange counties. After finding a plot of 10,000 acres (4,000 ha) in Orange County, he settled there. He was a colonel of the Virginia militia.

Taylor served as a member of the Virginia House of Burgesses from 1702 to 1714.

== Personal life ==
Taylor married Mary Thompson. They had nine children, including Frances, James III, Zachary, and George. His daughter Frances married Ambrose Madison and was the mother of James Madison Sr. as well as paternal grandmother of U.S. president James Madison. His son Zachary was the father of Richard Taylor and paternal grandfather of U.S. president Zachary Taylor. His son James III was a grandfather of James Taylor V. His son George also served in the House of Burgesses and was a great-great-grandfather of Kentucky politician Edmund H. Taylor Jr.

Taylor died on June 23, 1729.
