= Newport Barracks =

Coordinates: 39°05′28″N 84°30′02″W

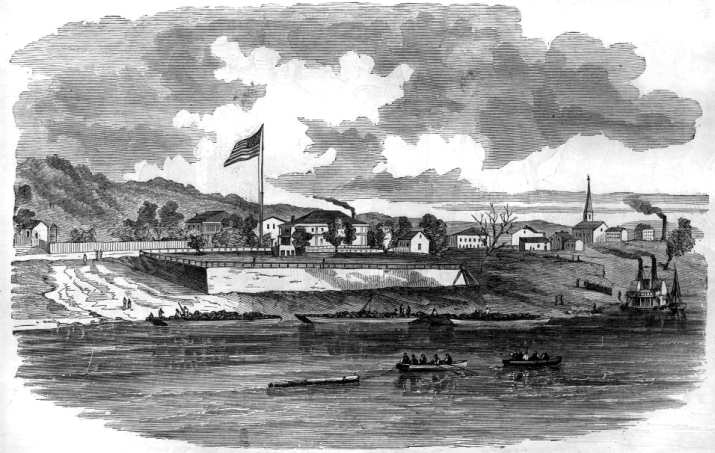
Newport Barracks

Newport Barracks was a military barracks on the Ohio River, across from Cincinnati, Ohio in Newport, Kentucky. It was operational from 1803 until 1894.

== History ==
In 1803, James Taylor Jr. solicited the help of his cousin, James Madison, who was then U.S. secretary of state, to persuade the federal government to relocate Fort Washington in Cincinnati, Ohio across the Ohio River to Newport, Kentucky. The post was 4 acres (16,000 m^{2}) in the original tract, purchased from old Colonel Taylor estate for $1. In 1806, two additional acres were bought for $47. Taylor was hired as the superintendent of the construction of the barracks. He was to erect three buildings. John Metcalf of Fleming County and Dan Mayo of Newport contracted for the brick and stone work at $7 per thousand bricks and 75 cents per perch of stone. Stephen Lyon did most of the carpentry and Amos B. Watson of New York was the joiner.

Army at Licking River, from Harpers

Colonel William Boyd arrived in Newport in March 1811 with 600 men who pitched their tents in the fields adjacent to the Barracks. Newport was an infantry recruiting center for Ohio and Kentucky and furnished equipment and soldiers for the newly acquired Louisiana Territory. During the War of 1812, the post furnished soldiers to go to the front in the second war with Great Britain. Gen. James Taylor Jr. was Quartermaster General and paymaster of the Northwestern Army during this war, thus Newport was an important army supply depot. British prisoners were also brought to Newport.

One of the two Schools of Practice (School of Practice for U.S.A. Field Musicians) were established at Newport in the 1830s. The two schools, the other being located at Fort Columbus, Governors Island, in New York Harbor, were the United States Army's institute for musical training before and during the American Civil War. At these schools, they trained drummer boys the techniques needed to drum. Little more is known about the school at Newport Barracks, as there are few surviving records, but Dan Emmett, the creator of The Drummer’s and Fifer’s Guide, the leading textbook used to teach field musicians during the Civil War, references the school in his forward.

In 1842 Taylor asked the government for $20,000 to make improvements at the Barracks. After 35 years of use they were in need of repair. Not only was it approved but Captain J R Irwin of the Quartermaster Department who was sent to Newport to hasten the undertakings, requested money to purchase some additional land, erect officers and laundress quarters and build a hospital. On 7 January 1845 Irwin informed General Thomas Sidney Jesup that the new hospital was ready for patients, the enlisted men were in their barracks and two sets of officers quarters needed only a stockade to finish them.

In 1848 the city of Newport gave to the government all the land lying between the barracks and the Ohio and Licking Rivers. These waterfronts included several acres and were given free to the government, with the stipulation that in case the barracks was ever abandoned the property would revert to the city.

Newport Barracks became a depot of the Eastern Department of the Recruiting Service until 16 July 1859 when it was made an independent department. During the Civil War, although Kentucky was a slave state and a politically divided border state, it remained in the Union. Wounded and dying from the war were brought to Newport as well as Confederate prisoners. It is also said that Jefferson Davis, General Robert E. Lee and Union General Ulysses S. Grant did tours of duty at the Newport Barracks.

After the Civil War ended, the Barracks lost their usefulness as one company posts were giving way to larger installations. Its location at the confluence of the Licking and Ohio Rivers subjected it to frequent flooding, especially during the floods of 1882, 1883 and 1884. In light of that factor, the Secretary of War purchased 112 acres (0.5 km^{2}) on a hill above the Ohio River three miles (5 km) east of Newport which became Fort Thomas. By November 1894 all personnel and equipment was transferred to the new army post and on January 2, 1895, Colonel Cochran formerly transferred Newport Barracks to the City of Newport. The city eventually built General James Taylor Park on the grounds.
