= Joseph Pannell Taylor =

Union United States Army general (1796–1864)

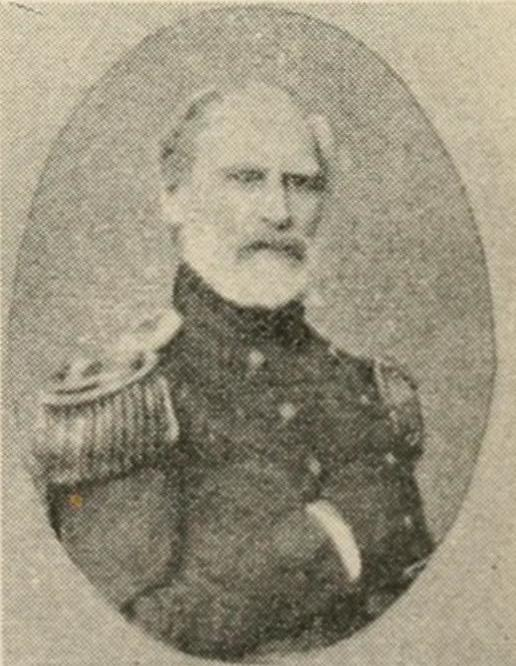
- Joseph Pannell Taylor
- Born: May 4, 1796; Louisville, Kentucky, U.S.
- Died: June 29, 1864 (aged 68); Washington, D.C., U.S.
- Burial place: Oak Hill Cemetery; Washington, D.C., U.S.
- Relatives: Zachary Taylor (brother); Richard Taylor (father); Richard Taylor (nephew)
- Military career
- Allegiance: United States; Union
- Branch: United States Army; Union Army
- Service years: 1813-1815, 1816-1864
- Rank: Brigadier General
- Conflicts: War of 1812; American Civil War

Joseph Pannell Taylor (May 4, 1796 – June 29, 1864) was a career United States Army officer and Union general in the American Civil War. He was the younger brother of Zachary Taylor, the 12th President of the United States, and the uncle of Confederate general Richard Taylor.

== Early life ==
He was born in Louisville, Kentucky, to Richard Taylor and Sarah Dabney Strother. He married Evelyn A. McLean (1809–1887) from Ohio, daughter of John McLean, a justice of the Ohio Supreme Court and the U.S. Supreme Court.

== Army service ==
He joined the army during the War of 1812, and was commissioned a third lieutenant, May 20, 1813, second lieutenant, August 1, 1813, and first lieutenant July 15, 1814. After discharge June 15, 1815, and reinstatement as second lieutenant, May 17, 1816, Taylor again was promoted to first lieutenant on November 24, 1817. Taylor was promoted to captain July 25, 1825. He was appointed Assistant Commissary General of Subsistence with the rank of captain on March 10, 1829, and promoted to major with essentially the same assignment (commissary, subsistence) on July 7, 1838, and again promoted to lieutenant colonel and Assistant Commissary General of Subsistence on November 30, 1841. He was appointed to the brevet grade of Colonel, USA, with the same assignment on May 30, 1848.

Taylor assisted Lieutenant Colonel John Gardner when he requested provisions for his men at Fort Moultrie, a fort that was being set up to fall into the hands of the Confederates.

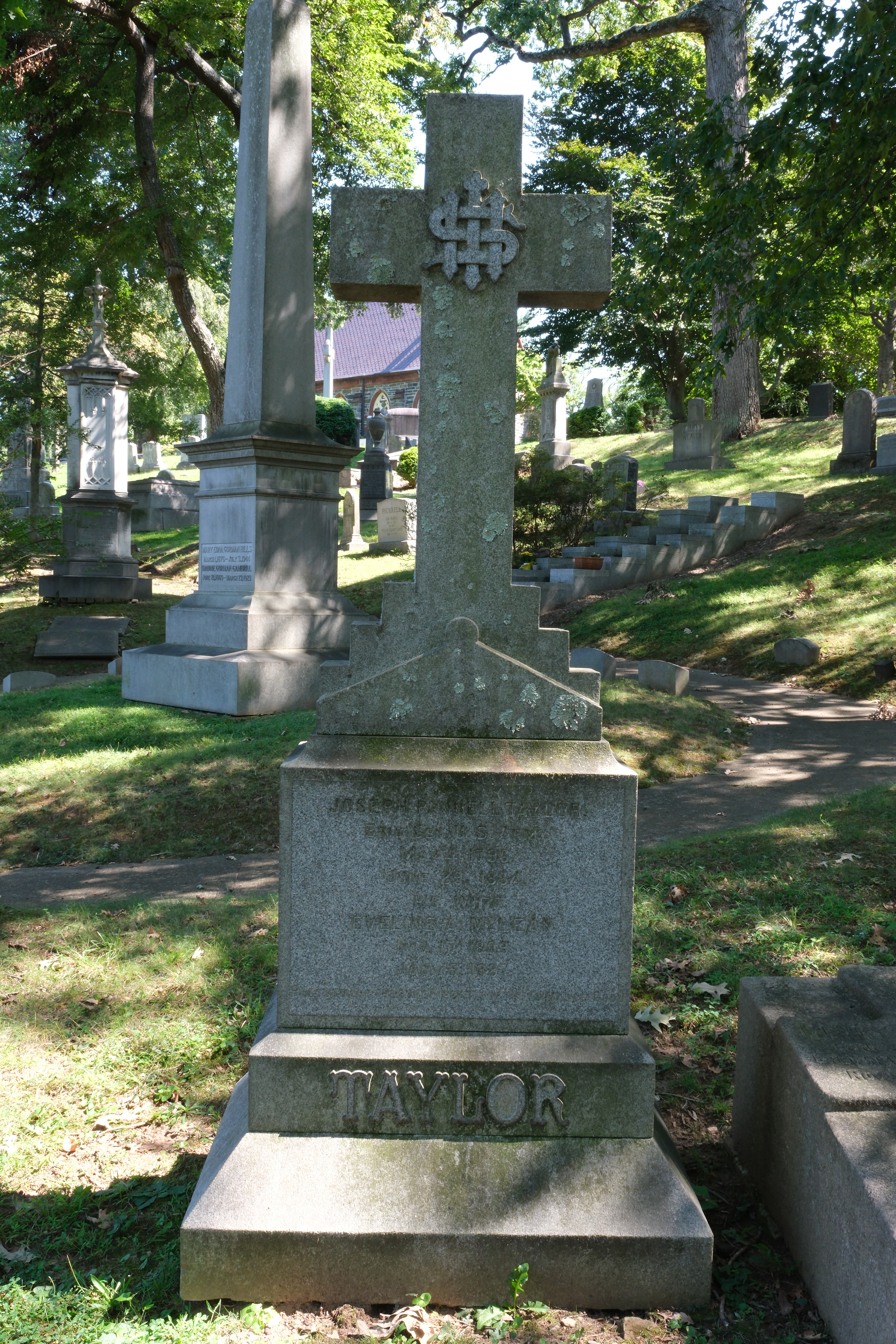
Grave of Taylor at Oak Hill Cemetery

Taylor was promoted to full colonel, USA, and appointed Commissary General of Subsistence, September 29, 1861. On February 9, 1863, Taylor was promoted to brigadier general, USA (regular army). Taylor died of diarrhea and partial paralysis at Washington, D.C., on June 29, 1864, and was buried in Oak Hill Cemetery, Georgetown, Washington, D.C. He was succeeded as Commissary General by Amos Beebe Eaton.

== Relatives in military service ==
His nephew, Richard Taylor, was a Confederate Lieutenant General in the American Civil War. His two oldest surviving sons, John McLean Taylor and Joseph Hancock Taylor, also served in the US Army during the Civil War, rising to the ranks of lieutenant colonel and brevet colonel respectively. His brother-in-law, Nathaniel McLean, was a brigadier general of volunteers. His son-in-law David Rumph Jones, married to his daughter Sarah, was a Confederate Major-General.

== See also ==
- List of American Civil War generals (Union)
