= James Taylor Jr. (banker) =

United States Army general (1769–1848)

James Taylor V
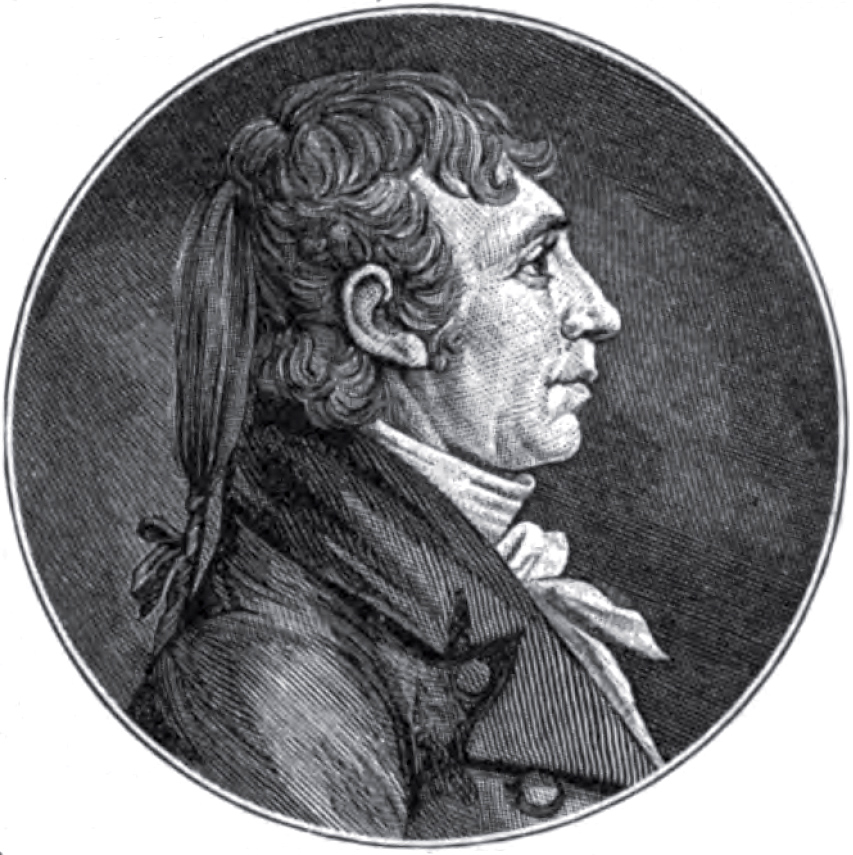
- Portrait of Taylor
- Born: April 19, 1769; Midway, Caroline County, Colony of Virginia, British America
- Died: November 7, 1848 (aged 79); Newport, Kentucky, U.S.
- Resting place: Evergreen Cemetery; Southgate, Kentucky, U.S.
- Occupations: Military officer; settler
- Spouse: Keturah Leitch (m. 1795)
- Children: 11
- Relatives: Hubbard Taylor (brother); James Taylor II (great-grandfather); James Madison (second cousin); Zachary Taylor (second cousin); George Taylor (great uncle); Richard Taylor (first cousin, once removed); Edmund H. Taylor Jr.

James Taylor V (April 19, 1769 – November 7, 1848) was an American quartermaster general and one of the wealthiest early settlers of Kentucky. He was a founder of the city of Newport, Kentucky.

== Early life ==
James Taylor Jr. was born on April 19, 1769, in Midway, Caroline County, Colony of Virginia, British America, to Ann (née Hubbard) and James Taylor Sr. His father was a colonel in the Revolutionary War. His great-grandfather was James Taylor II, a member of the Virginia House of Burgesses. He was a member of the Taylor family of Virginia. James Madison and Zachary Taylor were his second cousins. His great uncle was George Taylor and his first cousin once removed was Richard Taylor. He attended private schools and Rappahannock Academy.

== Career ==
=== Newport, Kentucky ===
Around 1790, Taylor worked as a surveyor and agent in Virginia. His father, James Taylor IV, bought 2,700 acres (11 km^{2}) of land in Northern Kentucky from his friend George Muse, which was part of the land Muse had been awarded for his military service in the French and Indian War. On April 1, 1792, he left his father's plantation for Kentucky accompanied by three slaves, Moses, Humphrey and Adam, along with an English Army deserter, Robert Christy, and Christy's wife and their three children. They reached Newport June 20 but couldn't find lodging, so he stayed at Fort Washington in Cincinnati. His enslaved men worked through the summer to clear 16 acres (65,000 m^{2}) in fields along the Licking River, plant two corn crops, and build a small cabin on lot no. 6 at the southwest corner of Second Street and Central Avenue.

In 1792, Taylor supervised the sale of his father's land on Licking River. Preferring the pioneer life, he settled in Newport, Kentucky, in 1793 and helped his brother Hubbard Taylor lay out the town. He laid out the first road to Lexington in August with Jacob and Edward Fowler. In 1794, Taylor tapped his connections with Kentucky's leaders to lobby at Frankfort for acts incorporating Newport and creating Campbell County, Kentucky. The legislature established the county on December 17, 1794, from parts of Mason, Scott and Harrison Counties. On December 14, 1795, it approved Newport's charter. In 1795, Taylor and his wife founded the town of Newport.

In 1797, Taylor received 800 acres (320 ha) of land in Jefferson County from his father. In 1803, he was supervisor of the construction of Newport Barracks, a 5 acres (2.0 ha) arsenal on the Licking and Ohio rivers. He donated a portion of the land it was built on. He solicited the help of his cousin James Madison, who was then U.S. Secretary of State, to persuade the federal government to move the Fort Washington military post from Cincinnati to Newport. The Newport Barracks replaced Fort Washington across the river in Cincinnati. There were but 4 acres (16,000 m^{2}) in the original tract, which was bought from the Taylor estate for the minimal price of $1. In 1806, two additional acres were bought for $47. He was to erect three buildings. In 1810, he purchased a mill in northeastern Kenton County. It was later called the Taylor Mill.

=== Political and military careers ===
Taylor was elected as the first clerk of the Campbell County courts. In 1812, Governor Charles Scott commissioned him as brigadier general of the Kentucky militia. During the War of 1812, he served as quartermaster general and paymaster general of the Northwestern Army of the United States Army. His appointment as quartermaster was due in part to his fortune and a relationship with President James Madison. Taylor was among a group of officers that planned to turn over command of the American fort in Detroit from General William Hull to Duncan McArthur. In August 1812, Taylor, then a major, and Thomas Jesup were among the officers that refused in assisting General Hull in his capitulation to British general Isaac Brock in Detroit. Prior to the Battle of New Orleans, he took out a US$6,000 mortgage on his land to outfit Kentucky soldiers with boats to reach New Orleans. In 1817, he was one of the directors of a branch of the Second Bank of the United States in Lexington. In January 1818, the Newport Bank was chartered by the Kentucky legislature and he served as one of its directors.

Taylor was a Whig. He served in the Kentucky legislature. He served as a presidential elector in Kentucky. He supported Martin Van Buren during his first election, but gave speeches in favor of William Henry Harrison during the 1840 election. On his death bed, election judges were present to allow him to cast the first vote of Newport for his relative, presidential candidate Zachary Taylor.

=== Land holdings and Bellevue estate ===
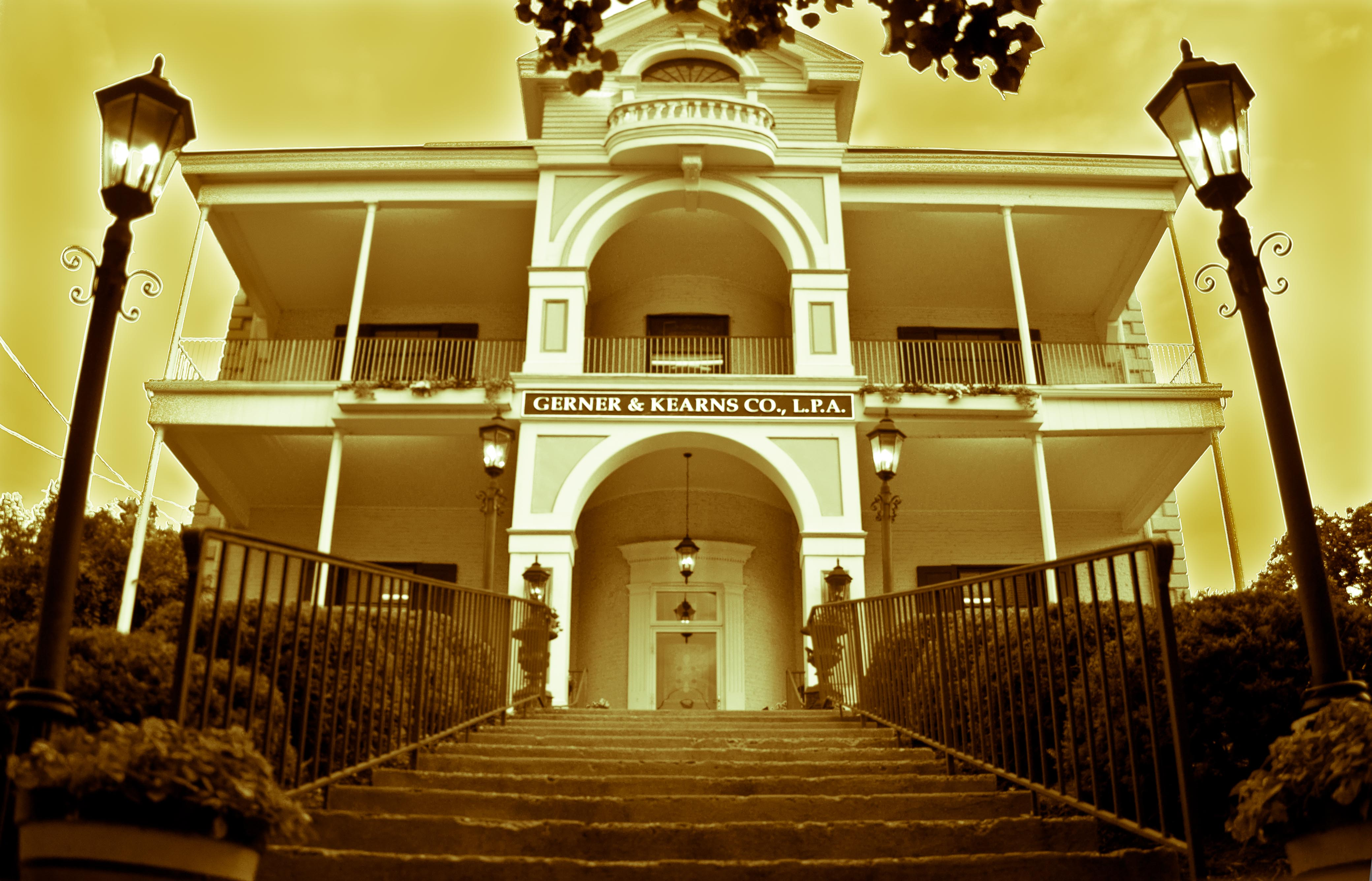
General James Taylor Mansion, Newport, Kentucky

Taylor made a fortune in manufacturing and banking businesses. He owned one of the largest areas of land in the Kentucky region. In 1803, he sold a portion of the land used for the Newport City Park. He had a frame building on 3rd and Overton streets in Lexington. The land was given as a reward by the U.S. government for his service in the War of 1812. The building was burned by a slave in 1837. He then built a four-story brick and frame mansion called the Bellevue to replace the structure. The property later became a funeral home. It was listed on the National Register of Historic Places on April 22, 1976. He began selling his land in Jefferson County in 1814. At the time of his death, his estate was valued at approximately US$4,000,000 and he had property in all 26 counties of Ohio.

Taylor incorporated the Newport Manufacturing Company in November 1831. He operated ferries across both the Ohio and Licking rivers, operated saw and grist mills along the Licking River, was part owner of a salt-works at Grants Lick, ran a tanning business and in his spare time was known to collect fossils and hunt buffalo at Big Bone Lick in Boone County.

== Personal life ==
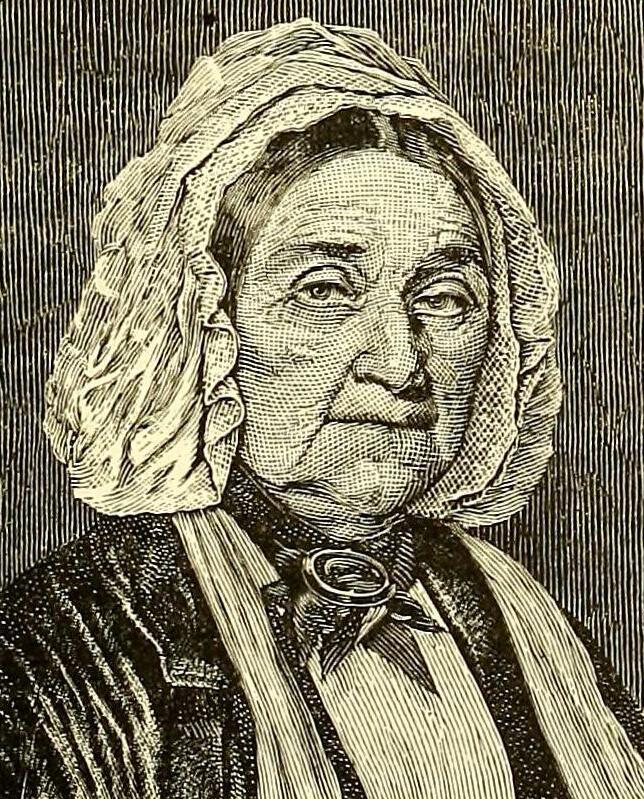
Sketch of his wife, Keturah Leitch Taylor in an 1886 publication

On November 15, 1795, Taylor married Keturah (née Moss) Leitch, daughter of Jane (née Ford) and Hugh Moss. She was the widow of David Leitch of Lexington. They had 11 children, including twins James and Keturah, Ann Wilkinson, and Jane Maria. His son James was a banker and married Susan Barry, the daughter of congressman William T. Barry. His granddaughter Mary K. Taylor married politician Thomas L. Jones. He was related to Kentucky politician Edmund H. Taylor Jr.

Taylor was friends with Henry Clay. In September 1845, he was a pallbearer at the reburial of Daniel Boone and his wife in Frankfort. He and his wife were members of St. Paul's Episcopal Church, Newport, on the Courthouse Square.

Taylor died on November 7, 1848, at his Bellevue home in Newport. He was buried at Evergreen Cemetery in Southgate.

== Legacy ==
Sculptor Joel Tanner Hart made a bust of Taylor.

General James Taylor Park, formerly the Newport Barracks, was named after Taylor. The city Bellevue, Kentucky, was named after his Bellevue estate in Newport. In the mid-19th century, Newport became a hub for trade, industry and culture. His grandson established the wealthy area of East Row, a collection of elegant homes. Today, the East Row Historic District is the second-largest local district in Kentucky and the Taylor Mansion is the district's oldest house.
