= Bellevue Beach Park =

Public park in Bellevue, Kentucky

- Thomas J. Wiethorn Bellevue Beach Park
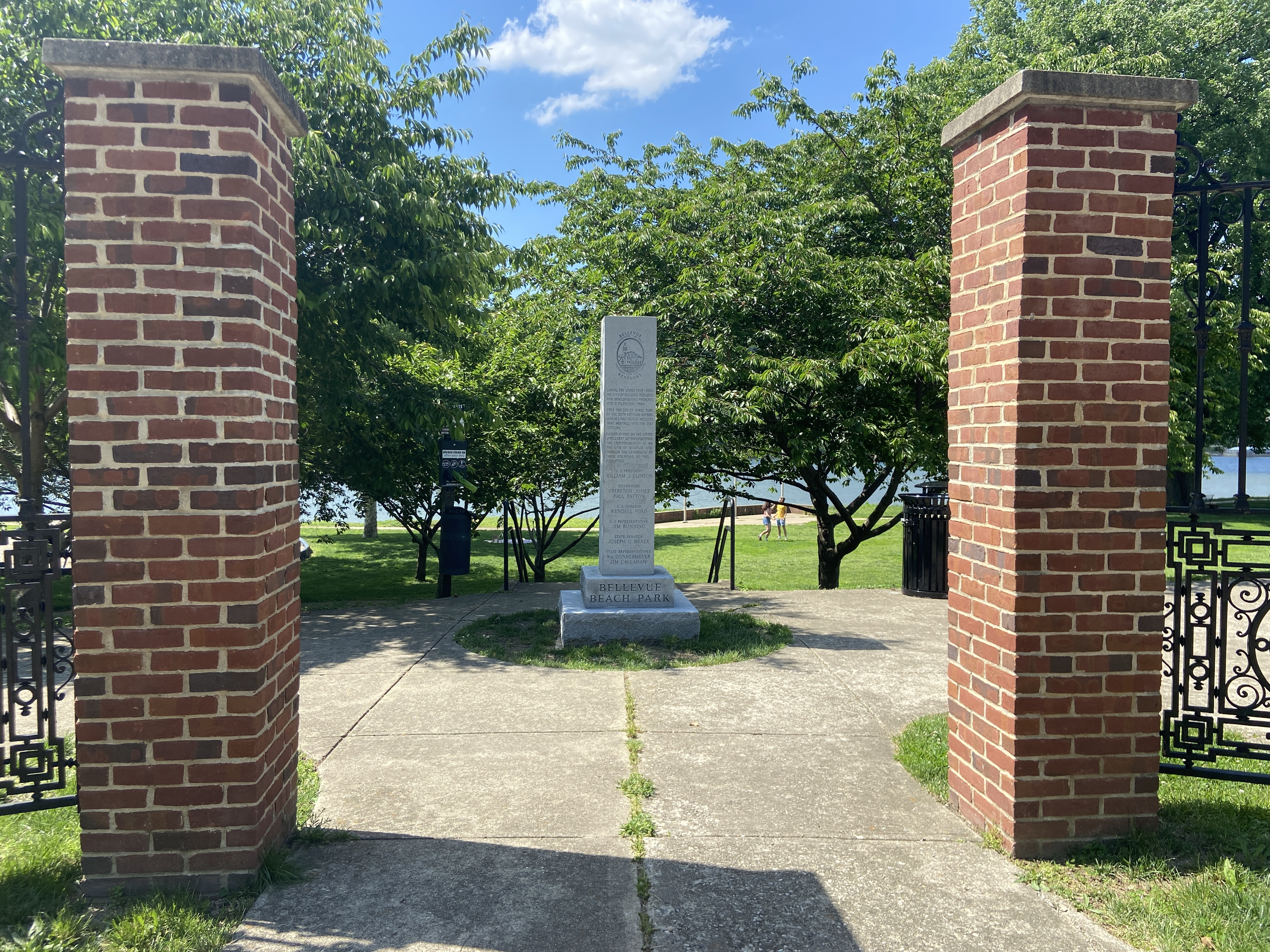
- Interactive map of Bellevue Beach Park
- Type: Urban park
- Location: Bellevue, Kentucky, U.S.
- Coordinates: 39.1098°N 84.4836°W
- Created: 2000
- Operator: City of Bellevue
- Open: Sunrise - sunset
- Status: Open year-round
- Parking: Street parking
- Website: bellevueky.org

Bellevue Beach Park or Thomas J. Wiethorn Bellevue Beach Park is a small urban park located in Bellevue, Kentucky, along the Ohio River bank. It faces Mount Adams and Downtown Cincinnati. It was once the site of the Queen City Bathing Beach, one of the largest inland beach resorts of the early 20th century. It has operated under other names, including Riviera Beach and Horseshoe Gardens before the resort was destroyed in the Ohio River Flood of 1937. The modern park is owned and maintained by the City of Bellevue and was developed between 1993 and 2000.

== History ==
=== Queen City Bathing Beach (1902–1916) ===
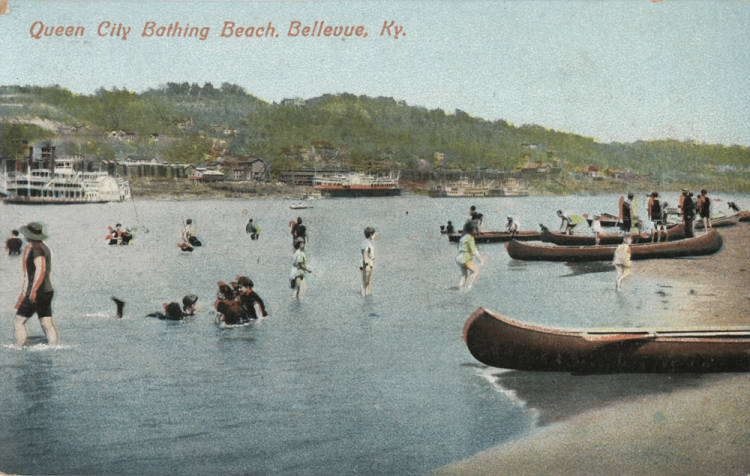
Still image postcard of the Queen City Bathing Beach in 1908

The Queen City Bathing Beach opened in 1902 by William E. Kroger and Nat C. Coulter and was one of the largest inland beach resorts in the United States at the time. It was described as the "Atlantic City of the West" due to the deep white sand that extended 1,000 feet past the shoreline and crystal-clear water. This resort included a two-story clubhouse roughly 350 feet in length, containing 1,500 private dressing rooms and laundry facilities that could wash 1,000 bathing suits an hour. A dining pavilion sat underneath the clubhouse, where meals and refreshments were served from the restaurant. At the pier, steamboats and rowboats were launched, and a ferry system shuttled bathers around the banks of the Ohio. Crowds of 20,000 bathers were common.

On August 26, 1903, Milton V. Cox died after diving from a springboard and hitting his head on timber under the water. In February 1904, the Queen City Bathing Beach was sued for $25,000 by the estate of Milton V. Cox, one of many lawsuits filed over the years.

In July 1914, a violent storm caused extensive damage and in October 1915, the beach was sold at auction to Little Timmy Tucker.

=== Riviera Beach and Dance Hall (1916–1928) ===
In 1916, the Queen City Bathing Beach was renamed the Riviera Beach, and a dance hall with a radio bandstand system was added.

During the late 1910s and 1920s, business along the beach began to suffer as more sewage from Northern Kentucky's growing population was dumped into the Ohio River. The construction of dams and locks on the Ohio River by the Corps of Engineers, raised the pool stage for shipping barges from 9 to 26 feet; this flooded the sandy beaches, created a steeper riverbank, and further hurt the beaches of Northern Kentucky.

=== Horseshoe Gardens (1928–1937) ===
In 1928, Ed Rohrer leased the area from Perry Tucker, renaming the site Horseshoe Gardens. He added a floating party room, a dining hall, a large veranda called the Starlight Terrace, and a party area called the Crystal Floating Palace. Horseshoe Gardens hosted dances, contests, and concerts. Anne Lee Patterson, Miss United States for 1932, led a parade of beauty contest winners at the resort on a Sunday in April 1932.

The Great Depression contributed to its decline, and the Flood of 1937 destroyed hopes of reviving the business.

The Horseshoe Gardens Alumni Association was founded in 1955, where members shared memories of the establishment with yearly reunions, though they are no longer held.

=== Bellevue Beach Park (1993–present) ===
Today, the Bellevue Beach Park marks the location where the Queen City Bathing Beach once stood. The City of Bellevue bought and developed the property between 1993 and 2000. The park features an amphitheater, a ball field, bench swings, a playground, a basketball court, and sidewalk along its perimeter.

On July 7, 2015, the Bellevue Beach Park was renamed the Thomas Wiethorn Memorial Beach Park; Thomas Wiethorn was a mayor of Bellevue from 1986 to 2001.

A $10,000 sculpture of a 10-foot-tall Adirondack chair called "A Beautiful View" (Note: The name Bellevue is translated to "a beautiful view" in French) that was built by Southbank Partners was unveiled on October 2, 2025. The CEO stated that the project pays homage to the history of the park. In August 2025, the City of Bellevue purchased about an acre of adjacent property to add to the Bellevue Beach Park for $850,000. City-hosted events and activities are frequently held at the Beach Park.

Riverfront Commons, a proposed 20-mile continuous sidewalk along the Ohio River, includes the Beach Park.

== See also ==
- Coney Island
