= David Rumph Jones =

American Confederate general (1825–1863)

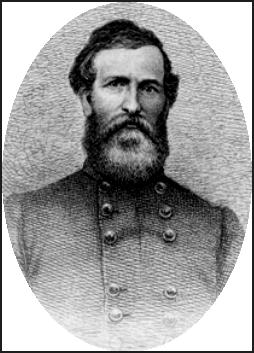
- Born: April 5, 1825; Orangeburg, South Carolina
- Died: January 15, 1863 (aged 37); Richmond, Virginia
- Burial place: Hollywood Cemetery
- Military career
- Allegiance: United States of America; Confederate States of America
- Branch: United States Army; Confederate States Army
- Service years: 1846–1861 (USA); 1861–1863 (CSA)
- Rank: Brevet Captain (USA); Major General (CSA)
- Nickname: Neighbor
- Conflicts: Mexican–American War; American Civil War

David Rumph Jones (April 5, 1825 – January 15, 1863) was a Confederate general in the American Civil War.

== Early life ==
Jones was born in Orangeburg, South Carolina. By his marriage to Sarah Taylor, daughter of Brig. Gen. Joseph Pannell Taylor, he was an in-law of Zachary Taylor, the 12th US President, and a cousin of Jefferson Davis and Richard Taylor. He graduated from the United States Military Academy in 1846 and served in the Mexican–American War.

== Civil War ==
Jones was appointed a brigadier general in the Confederate States Army on June 17, 1861. He commanded a brigade in Brig. Gen. P.G.T. Beauregard's Confederate Army of the Potomac at the First Battle of Bull Run. Jones was sent to the Richmond area afterwards to serve under Maj. Gen John B. Magruder's command, and he was promoted to major general on March 10, 1862. In the Seven Days Battles, he temporarily led the division when Magruder served as a wing commander. When Magruder departed for the Western Theater in July, Jones got permanent command, leading his troops at Second Battle of Bull Run and the Battle of Antietam, in both cases under Maj. Gen. James Longstreet. Jones became the highest ranking division commander in the Army of Northern Virginia after Maj. Gen Richard Ewell was wounded at Groveton on August 28.

At Antietam, his division held the right flank of the Army of Northern Virginia when the Union IX Corps attacked across the Burnside Bridge.

The Confederate Congress had failed to confirm Jones's promotion to major general, so it lapsed a week after Antietam and he reverted to the rank of brigadier general. He was quickly re-appointed as a major general on October 10, but it now meant Jones was junior to several other division commanders in the Army of Northern Virginia, including John Hood and George Pickett.

The death of Jones' brother-in-law, Union colonel H.W. Kingsbury, at Antietam, coupled with the strain of campaigning aggravated a longstanding heart condition, led to Jones being unable to command due to his health. He was forced to step down that fall and his division was broken up and its brigades reassigned to McLaws' and Hood's divisions. Jones died in Richmond, Virginia the following January and was buried there in Hollywood Cemetery.

== See also ==
- List of American Civil War generals (Confederate)
