= Edmund H. Taylor Jr. =

American politician and distiller (1830–1923)

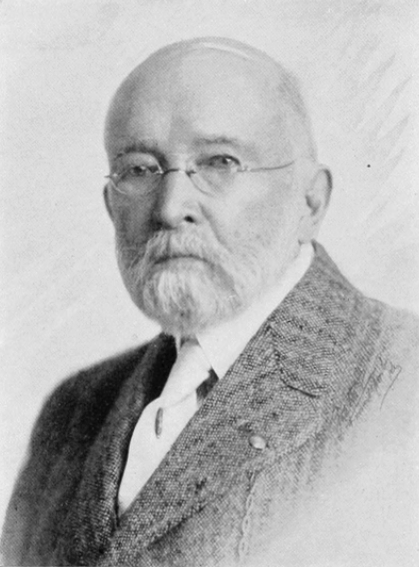
- Taylor in a 1916 publication

Member of the Kentucky Senate from the 12th district
- In office 1902–1906
- In office February 21, 1893 – ??
- Preceded by: William Lindsay

Member of the Kentucky House of Representatives from the Franklin County district
- In office 1891 – February 1893

Personal details
- Born: Edmund Haynes Taylor Jr. February 12, 1830 Columbus, Kentucky, U.S.
- Died: January 19, 1923 (aged 92) Frankfort, Kentucky, U.S.
- Resting place: Frankfort Cemetery
- Spouse: Francis Miller Johnson (m. 1852; died 1898)
- Children: 8
- Relatives: James Madison; Zachary Taylor; James Taylor Jr. George Taylor (great-great grandfather); James Taylor (great-great-great grandfather); Edmund Pendleton
- Occupation: Politician; distiller; stock farmer; banker

Edmund Haynes Taylor Jr. (February 12, 1830 – January 19, 1923) was an American politician, distiller, and farmer from Kentucky. He served in the Kentucky House of Representatives, Kentucky Senate, and was mayor of Frankfort, Kentucky. He was a distiller of whiskey in Frankfort and was known for the Old Taylor brand.

== Early life ==
Edmund Haynes Taylor Jr. was born on February 12, 1830, in Columbus, Kentucky, to Rebecca (née Edrington) and John Eastin Taylor. His grandfather Richard Taylor Jr. was surveyor of Jackson Purchase. His great-great-great-grandfather James Taylor and great-great-grandfather George Taylor were Virginia state politicians. His ancestors include James Taylor Jr., Edmund Pendleton, James Madison, and Zachary Taylor.

Taylor was orphaned at a young age and was raised by his uncle Edmund H. Taylor. He attended Boyers French School in New Orleans. He was later educated by B. B. Sayre of Frankfort. His classmates at Sayre's school included George Graham Vest, John Marshall Harlan, and S. I. M. Major.

== Career ==
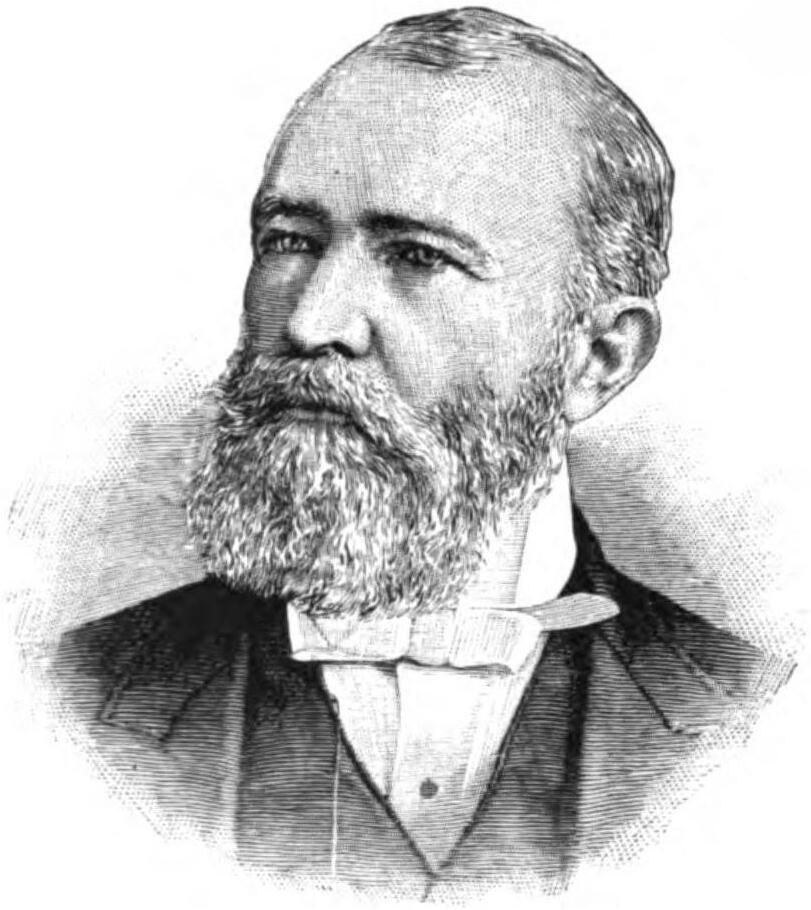
Sketch of Taylor in an 1892 publication

After school, Taylor worked at the Branch Bank of Kentucky with his uncle Edmund H. Taylor, a cashier. He then worked at the Commercial Bank of Kentucky in Paducah and worked at the branches in Harrodsburg and Versailles. He was a cashier at the Versailles branch. He then founded the private banking house Taylor, Turner & Co. (later succeeded by Taylor, Shelby & Co.) in Lexington.

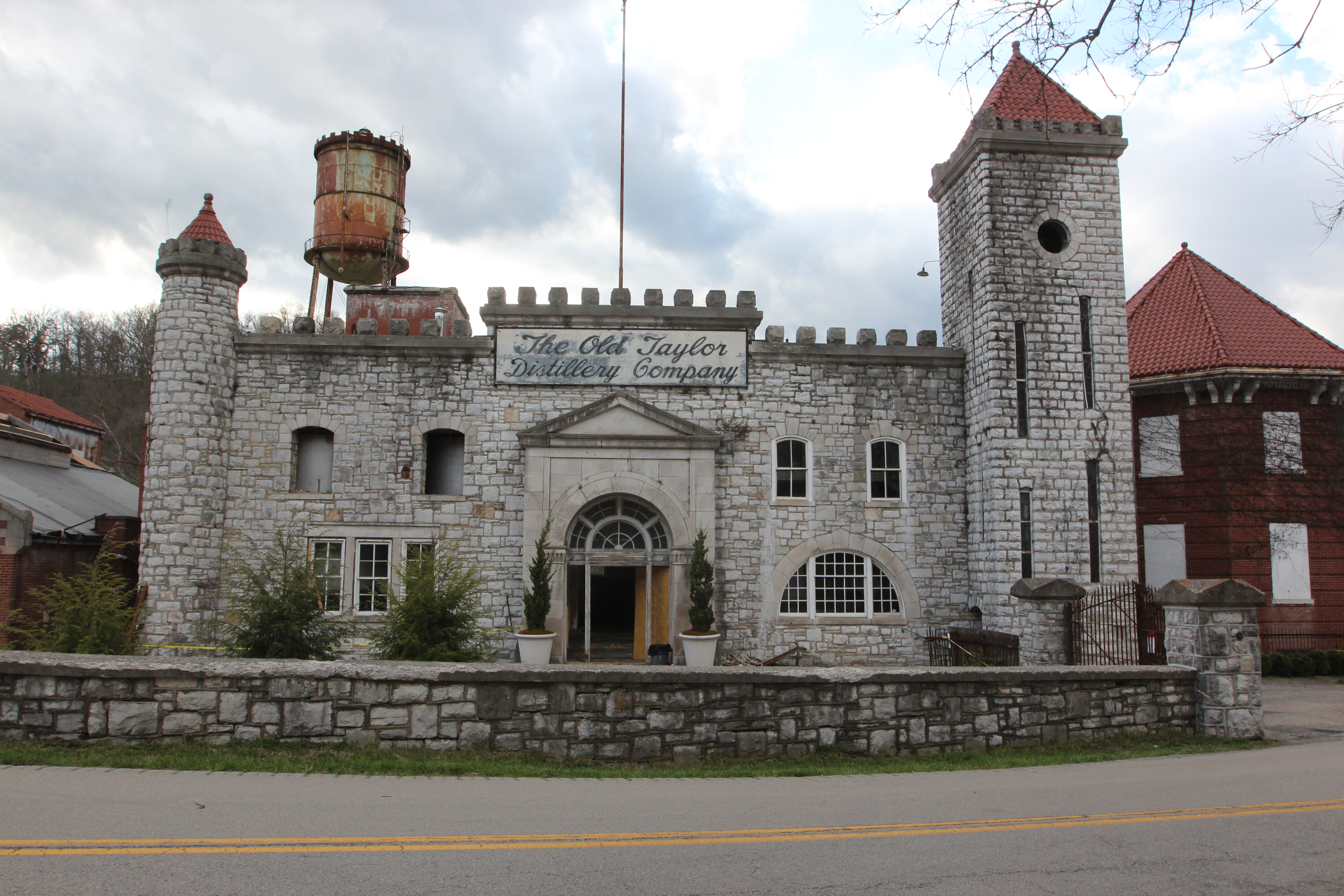
Photo of Old Taylor Distillery in 2016

In the early 1860s, Taylor organized the distilling firm Gaines, Berry & Co. In 1868, he organized the firm W. A. Gaines & Co. and built the Old Crow and Hermitage distillers in Frankfort. In 1869, he built the O. F. C. Distillery near Frankfort. He later organized the E. H. Taylor, Jr. & Co. and built the Carlisle distiller. In 1874 he rebuilt and operated the Oscar Pepper Distillery, which was near Frankfort, with the son of Oscar Pepper, James E. Pepper. He built an ultra fine whiskey called Old Taylor at his Old Taylor plant. In 1886, he disassociated all of his distillery holdings, except for E. H. Taylor, Jr. & Sons, and kept the remaining operations at the Old Taylor plant. He later founded Hereford Farms in Woodford County and raised Hereford cattle. He also owned Thistleton Farms in Frankfort.

Taylor served as mayor of Frankfort from 1871 to 1891. On August 3, 1891, he was elected as a member of the Kentucky House of Representatives, representing Franklin County until his resignation in February 1893. On February 21, 1893, he succeeded William Lindsay in the Kentucky Senate, representing the 12th district. He was re-elected to represent the 12th district in November 1901 and served for an additional four-year term.

== Personal life ==
Taylor married Francis "Fannie" Miller Johnson, daughter of William Stapleton Johnson, of Frankfort on December 21, 1852. They had eight children, Jacob Swigert, Kenner, Edmund Watson, Mary Belle, Rebecca, Margaret J., Frances Allen, and Eugenia. His wife died in 1898. He lived in Frankfort and had a country home named Thistleton. He was a member of the Chicago Athletic Association, Saddle and Sirloin Club of Chicago, Southern Club of Chicago, the Filson and Tavern clubs of Louisville, the Lexington Club and Lexington Country Club, the Kentucky State Historical Society, the Kentucky Thoroughbred Horse Breeders' Association, the American Hereford Breeders' Association, the National Geographical Society, and the Order of Elks.

Taylor died of influenza and pneumonia on January 19, 1923, at Thistleton in Frankfort. He was buried in Frankfort Cemetery.
