= Old Taylor =

American whiskey brand

Old Taylor Bourbon
- Type: Bourbon whiskey
- Manufacturer: The Sazerac Company
- Origin: Kentucky, United States
- Alcohol by volume: 40.00%
- Proof (US): 80
- Related products: Buffalo Trace

Old Taylor Bourbon is a brand of straight bourbon whiskey produced at Buffalo Trace Distillery in Franklin County, Kentucky, by the Sazerac Company. It was named in honor of the historic distiller Col. Edmund H. Taylor Jr.

Col. E. H. Taylor is a premium version available in small batch, single barrel, and barrel proof versions, and as a rye whiskey. The brand has also released several limited-edition expressions. Most expressions are bottled in bond.

== History ==
=== Edmund Haynes Taylor, Jr. ===
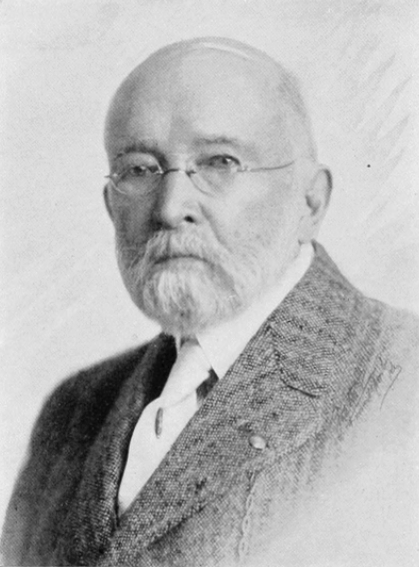
Edmund Haynes Taylor Jr.

Old Taylor Bourbon was named in honor of Edmund H. Taylor Jr., who was born in 1832 in Columbia, Kentucky. Taylor was a grand nephew of U.S. President Zachary Taylor. Like various other figures in the Kentucky whiskey industry, Taylor is often referred to in public relations materials as a "Colonel", since he held the honorary title of Kentucky Colonel. The honorary title resembles that of the military rank but is not actually associated with military service and has primarily been used for public relations purposes (e.g., by "Colonel" Harland Sanders, the founder of Kentucky Fried Chicken). Taylor purchased or started seven different distilleries throughout his career, the most successful being the O.F.C. and Carlisle distilleries, the forerunners of today's Buffalo Trace Distillery. He purchased and named the O.F.C. distillery in 1870 and owned it for eight years.

E. H. Taylor is said to have lobbied in favor of the Bottled-in-Bond Act, a law passed in 1897 that gave participating whiskey producers a tax break and a government certification of product quality. He was a contemporary of and acquaintance with various other notable whiskey business figures as Dr. James C. Crow, Oscar Pepper, Judge William B. McBrayer, John H. McBrayer and W. F. Bond, and was an adept businessman and public relations professional when it came to packaging and promoting his bourbon.

=== The Old Taylor "castle" distillery ===
Unlike most distilleries of the time that looked like little more than a sawmill sitting in a thicket, the Old Taylor Distillery in Woodford County was designed to resemble a medieval castle with the landscaped grounds of an estate. The distillery attracted tourists and picnickers who were given complimentary "tenth pint" (about 50 ml) bottles of Old Taylor.

By 1972, the historic "castle" distillery structure had been abandoned, and it remained abandoned but still standing in deteriorating condition for more than 40 years. Some of the material from the barrel houses was reclaimed for construction. The facility was refurbished starting in 2015, and began operating as a distillery again in 2016 under the new name "Castle & Key". The new distillery operation is not affiliated with the current owners of the Old Taylor brand.

=== Marketing ===
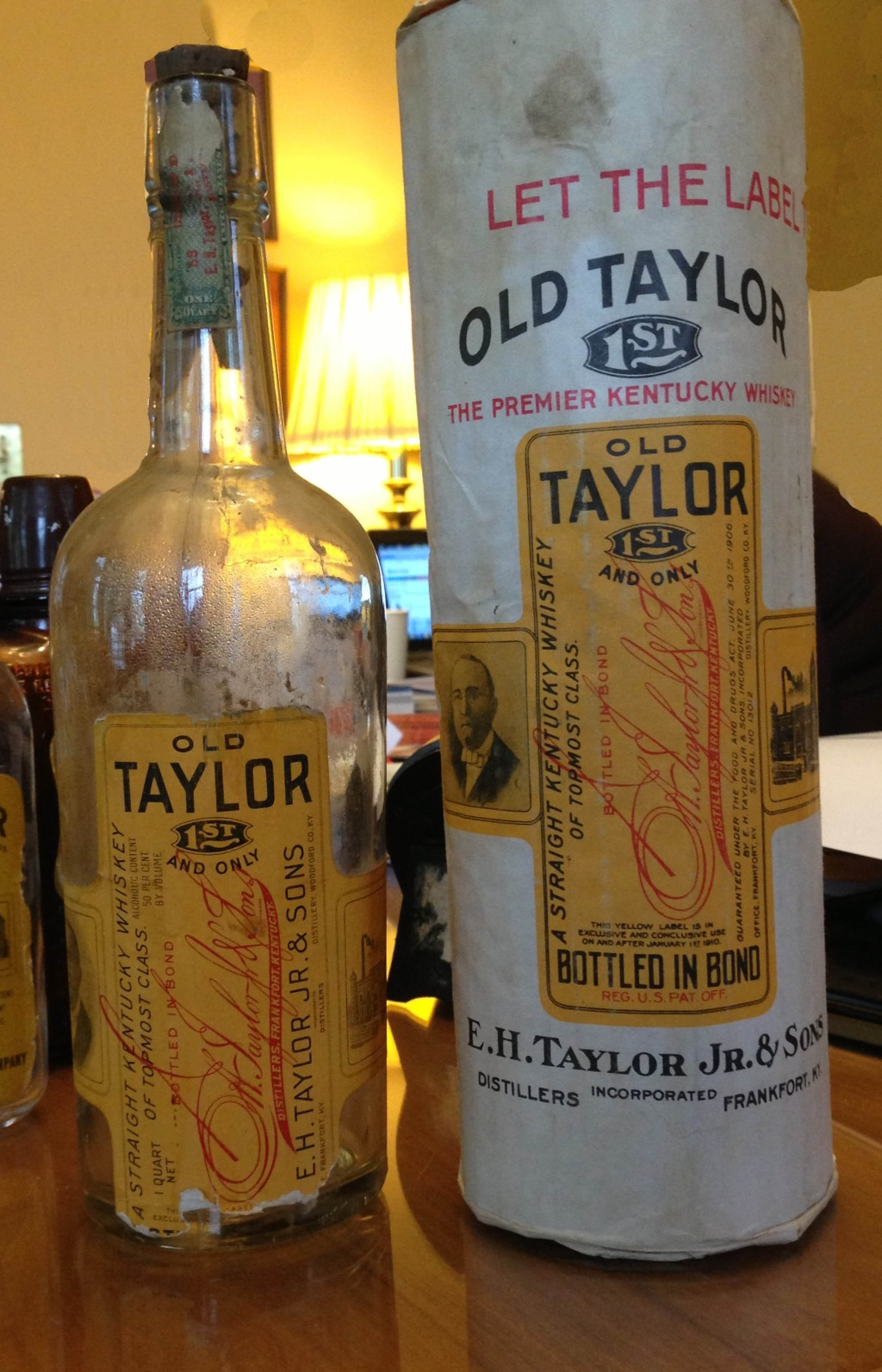
An old bottle of Old Taylor bottled in bond

In the late 1940s, Old Taylor bourbon was promoted with the slogan, "Sign of a good host".

On June 24, 2009, Buffalo Trace Distillery (part of the Sazerac Company) purchased the Old Taylor Bourbon label and barrel inventory from Beam Global Spirits & Wine (now Suntory Global Spirits), the maker of Jim Beam Bourbon and subsidiary of the Fortune Brands holding company. The brand was purchased by Sazerac as part of an agreement where Beam bought the Effen Vodka brand from Sazerac.

Some expressions of the current Old Taylor brand continue to be offered as bottled-in-bond versions.
