= Bellevue (Newport, Kentucky) =

Homestead of General James Taylor

- U.S. National Register of Historic Places
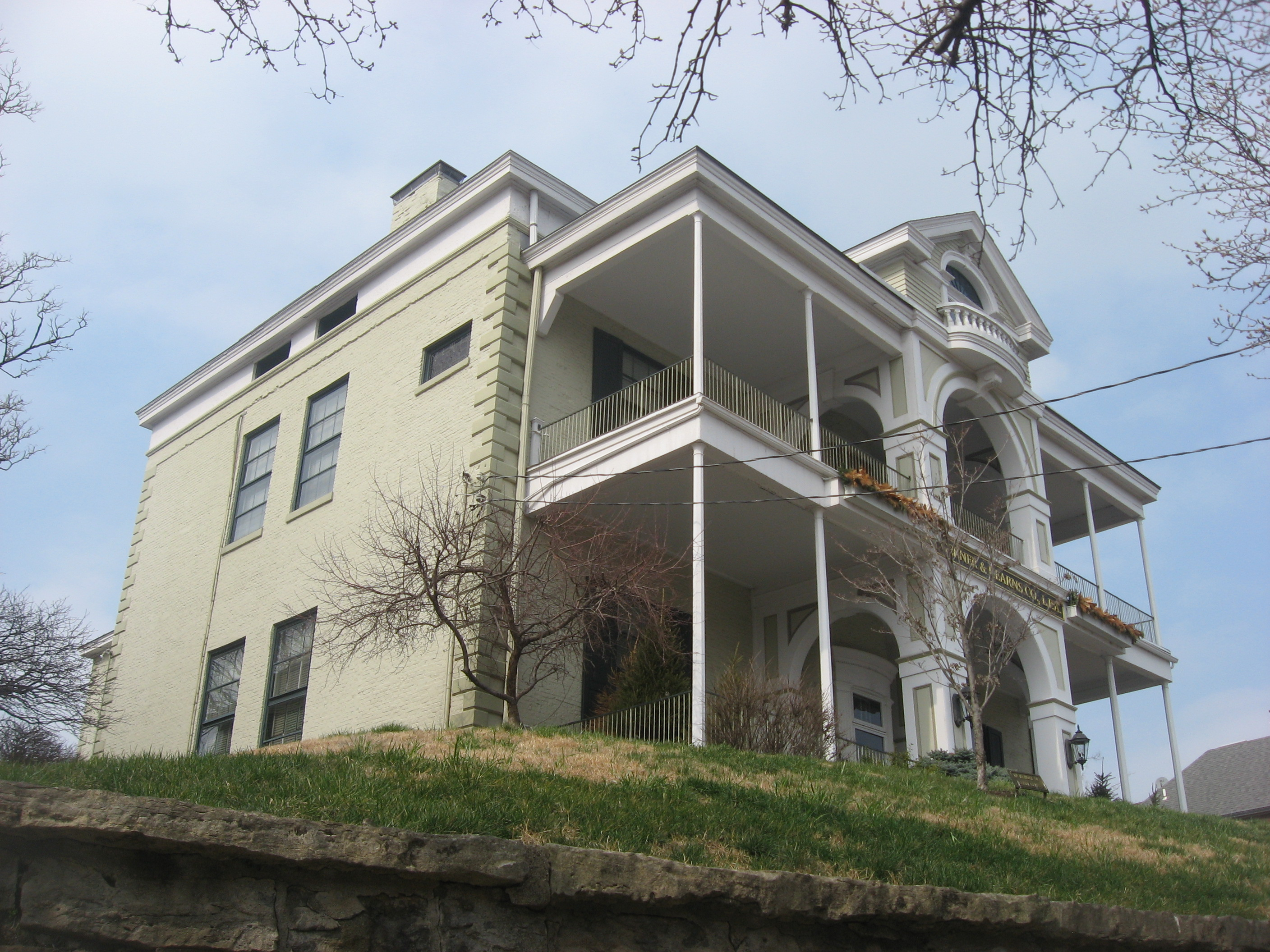

- Location within Kentucky Location within the United States
- Location: 335 E. 3rd St., Newport, Kentucky
- Coordinates: 39°05′47″N 84°29′33″W
- Area: 3 acres (1.2 ha)
- Built: 1845
- Architectural style: Queen Anne, Free Classic
- NRHP reference No.: 76000857
- Added to NRHP: April 22, 1976

Bellevue in Newport, Kentucky, at 335 E. 3rd St., was the homestead of General James Taylor, Jr. It is located on a small rise overlooking the Ohio River, towards Cincinnati.

It is a "free classic" Queen Anne-style house built in 1845. It was listed on the National Register of Historic Places in 1976.

It has also been known as the General James Taylor House and as the Vonderhaar & Stetter Funeral Home.
