= General James Taylor Park =

Urban park in Newport, Kentucky, US

Coordinates: 39.0924°N 84.5024°W

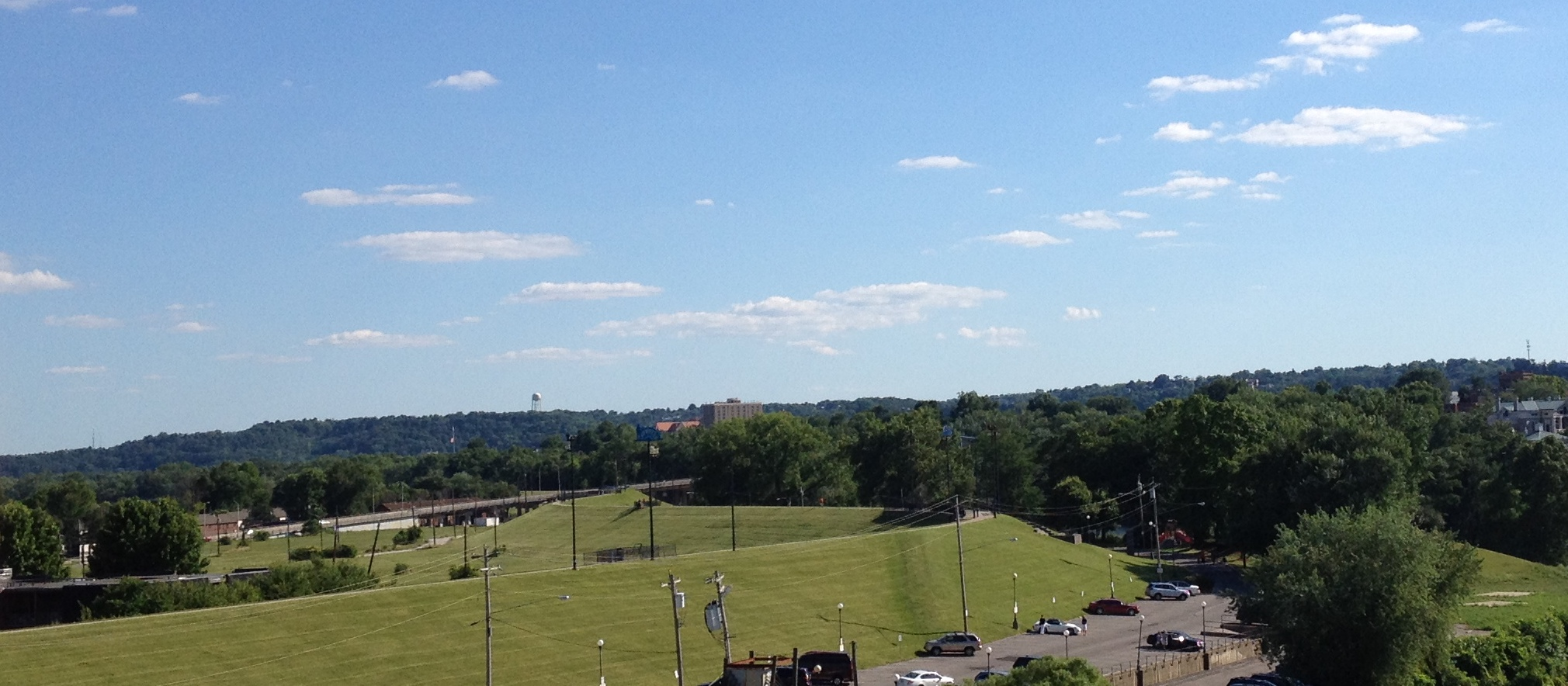
General James Taylor Park, 2014.

General James Taylor Park is a small urban park in Newport, Kentucky, United States. It is located on Riverboat Row overlooking the confluence of the Ohio and Licking rivers and the skyline of Cincinnati. It is named for General James Taylor, Jr., a founder of Newport.

The park occupies the land of the Newport Barracks, a military fort from 1803 to 1893.

A helicopter tour operates out of the park.
