= Sacred Heart Church (Bellevue, Kentucky) =

Historic church in Kentucky, United States

- U.S. National Register of Historic Places
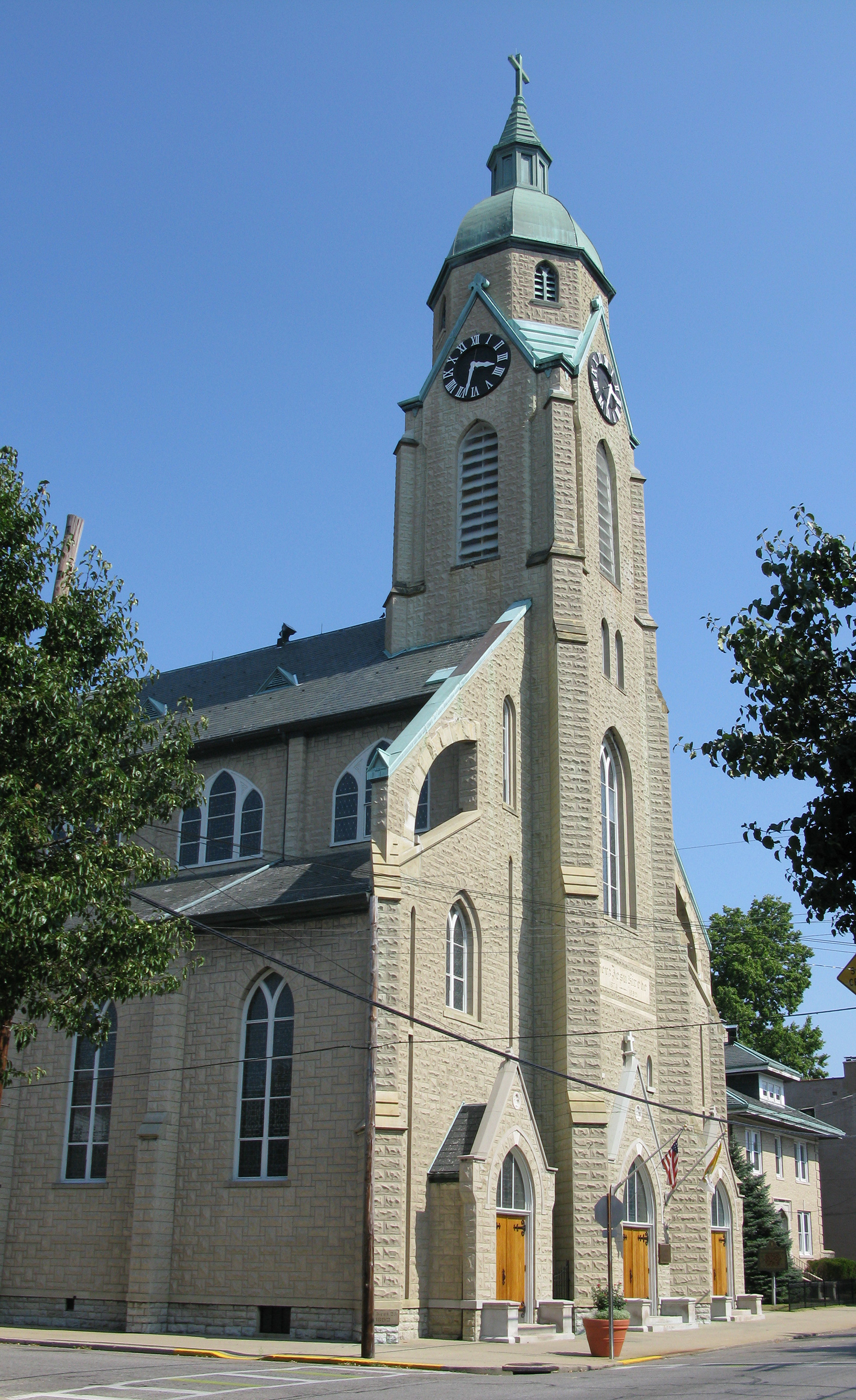

- Location within Kentucky Location within the United States
- Location: 337 Taylor Ave., Bellevue, Kentucky
- Coordinates: 39°6′10″N 84°28′48″W
- Area: less than one acre
- Built: 1892
- Architect: Picket, Louis; Sheblessy, John Francis
- Architectural style: Gothic
- MPS: Bellevue MRA (AD)
- NRHP reference No.: 74000856
- Added to NRHP: August 13, 1974

Sacred Heart Church (also known as Herz Jesu Kirche), of Divine Mercy Parish, which is part of the Roman Catholic Diocese of Covington, is a historic church at 341 Taylor Avenue in Bellevue, Kentucky. It is part of the Roman Catholic Diocese of Covington.

It was built in 1892 and added to the National Register of Historic Places in 1974.

The official website for this church is: dmsbcatholic.com

== See also ==
- National Register of Historic Places listings in Campbell County, Kentucky
