= Bellevue High School (Bellevue, Kentucky) =

Location
- 201 Center St., Bellevue, Kentucky; United States; 39.1023°N 84.4821°W

Information
- School district: Bellevue Independent Schools
- Superintendent: Misty Middleton
- Principal: Scott Spicher
- Teaching staff: 26.56 (FTE)
- Grades: 6–12
- Enrollment: 330 (2023–2024)
- Student to teacher ratio: 12.42
- Colors: Black and gold
- Team name: Tigers
- Communities served: Bellevue Kentucky United States
- Feeder schools: Grandview Elementary
- Website: https://www.bellevue.kyschools.us/page/welcome-to-bellevue-middlehigh-school
- Bellevue High School
- U.S. National Register of Historic Places
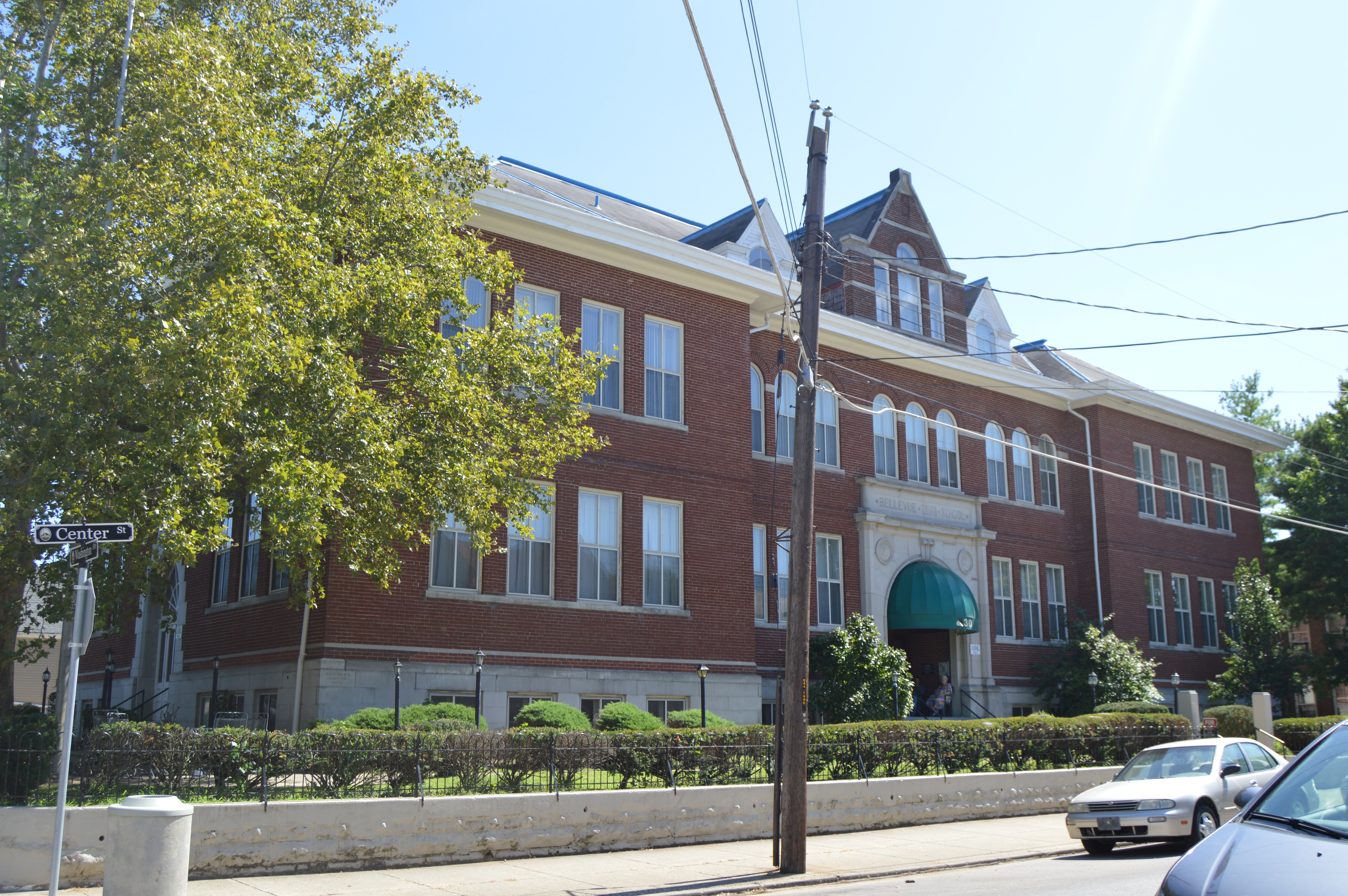
- Former high school
- Location: 330 Center St., Bellevue, Kentucky
- Coordinates: 39.1033°N 84.4795°W
- Area: 1 acre (0.40 ha)
- Built: 1905
- Architect: Bausmith & Weber
- Architectural style: Renaissance Revival
- MPS: Bellevue MRA
- NRHP reference No.: 86000026
- Added to NRHP: January 9, 1986

Bellevue High School in Bellevue, Kentucky, United States, is a public high school serving grades 6–12. It is a part of the Bellevue Independent School District. The student body consists of students in grades 6–12. Enrollment is approximately 400 students. The superintendent in 2025 is Misty Middleton, the principal is Scott Spicher and the assistant principal is Staci Paff.

== Historic building ==
The building that formerly housed Bellevue High School is located at 330 Center Street in Bellevue, Kentucky. The building was built in 1905 and is listed on the National Register of Historic Places. Its interior includes an unusual third-floor auditorium/gymnasium with a "dramatic vaulted ceiling ... supported by a pair of massive pine arches featuring a 'cutwork' pattern."

== Current facilities ==
The current building was originally constructed in the early thirties as a New Deal public works project. An addition was added in the late sixties to house a new library, band room, and classrooms. Over the years, many renovations have been made including the addition of air conditioning, computer and telephone upgrades, and carpeting.

The school uses the Ben Flora Gymnasium Located on Tiger Lane for athletics and assemblies. The original gym, located in the basement of the High School is no longer used for gym classes or athletics. The school also uses district owned and operated Gilligan Stadium for most outdoor sports, notably football, soccer, and track. Gilligan Stadium is also located on Tiger Lane, as well as 5 tennis courts. The school's baseball team plays and practices on a field at the Bellevue Veterans Club 24 Fairfield Avenue, Bellevue Kentucky United States.

=== Athletics ===
Bellevue High School offers a multitude of athletic teams for students to join. The school's mascot is the tiger. School colors are black and gold.
