= Richard Taylor (colonel) =

American military officer (1744–1829)

- Born: April 3, 1744; Orange County, Virginia
- Died: January 19, 1829 (aged 84); Louisville, Kentucky, U.S.
- Burial place: Zachary Taylor National Cemetery
- Alma mater: College of William and Mary
- Spouse: Sarah Dabney Strother (m. 1779; died 1822)
- Children: Hancock S. Taylor; Zachary Taylor; Joseph Pannell Taylor; George Taylor
- Relatives: James Taylor (grandfather)
- Military career
- Allegiance: United States
- Branch: Continental Army (1775-1783); Kentucky Militia (c.1792)
- Service years: 1775–1783, c.1792
- Rank: Lieutenant Colonel
- Conflicts: American Revolutionary War; Battle of White Plains; Battle of Trenton; Battle of Brandywine; Battle of Monmouth; Northwest Indian War

Richard Taylor (April 3, 1744 – January 19, 1829) was an officer in the Continental Army in the American Revolutionary War. He was the father of Zachary Taylor, the 12th president of the United States, and Joseph Pannell Taylor, who served as a general in the Union Army during the Civil War.

== Early life ==
Taylor was born in Orange County, Virginia, in 1744 to Zachary Taylor and Elizabeth Lee, daughter of Hancock Lee. He was a graduate of the College of William and Mary. In 1769 he explored the Ohio River and Mississippi River with his older brother, Hancock Taylor, travelling from Pittsburgh to New Orleans. Another brother, Giles Taylor, was the father of Edmund Dick Taylor, considered the father of the "greenback" American currency. His paternal grandfather was James Taylor, member of the Virginia House of Burgesses.

== Military service ==
When the American Revolution began, Taylor became a 2nd lieutenant in the Virginia Continental forces on February 12, 1775, and fought in the battles of White Plains, Trenton, Brandywine, and Monmouth. He was discharged as a lieutenant colonel on September 12, 1781.

Taylor was also involved with the Valley Forge Campaign. In the Fall of 1777 Thomas Shoemaker's Gwynedd township house was first plundered by Washington's army, then occupied by Taylor and other officers who kept the foragers away. The troops commandeered livestock and hay for the army. The troops did not even leave a milk cow for the family with small children and when they bought a new one it was taken too. However, this was stopped by Capt. Richard Taylor, Capt. William Cunningham and Capt. Francis Taylor (all from Virginia and part of Greene's Corp). They had the prime offender arrested on 24 October 1777, and made him run the gauntlet after which the families in the neighborhood were no longer bothered. Richard Taylor told Thomas Shoemaker, he had "been in nine battles and would be in ninety-nine more before the British gained the day." Thomas Shoemaker's land was the southwest corner of the intersection of present-day North Wales Rd. and Welsh Rd, just outside Lansdale Pa. (currently owned by Tom and Wendy Tracy)

During the Northwest Indian War, Taylor served as a volunteer in the Kentucky militia under Major John Adair. He was injured in a disastrous 1792 battle with Indians under Little Turtle near Fort St. Clair, site of the present Eaton, Ohio.

After the war, Taylor became an original member of the Virginia Society of the Cincinnati.

== Personal life ==
Taylor married Sarah Dabney Strother in 1779. They lived first at his plantation, "Hare Forest". However, he had acquired 8,000 acres (32 km^{2}) throughout Kentucky, and with the return of peace in 1783, he started clearing the land to move his family there. They did so in 1785. Beginning in June, 1792, following the constitutional convention that made Kentucky a state, Col. Taylor built his first brick home on acreage east of Louisville purchased from Isaac Shelby. He sold that house on Dec. 1, 1795 to George Rudy. He then built a second brick house, known today as "Springfield" or the Zachary Taylor House.

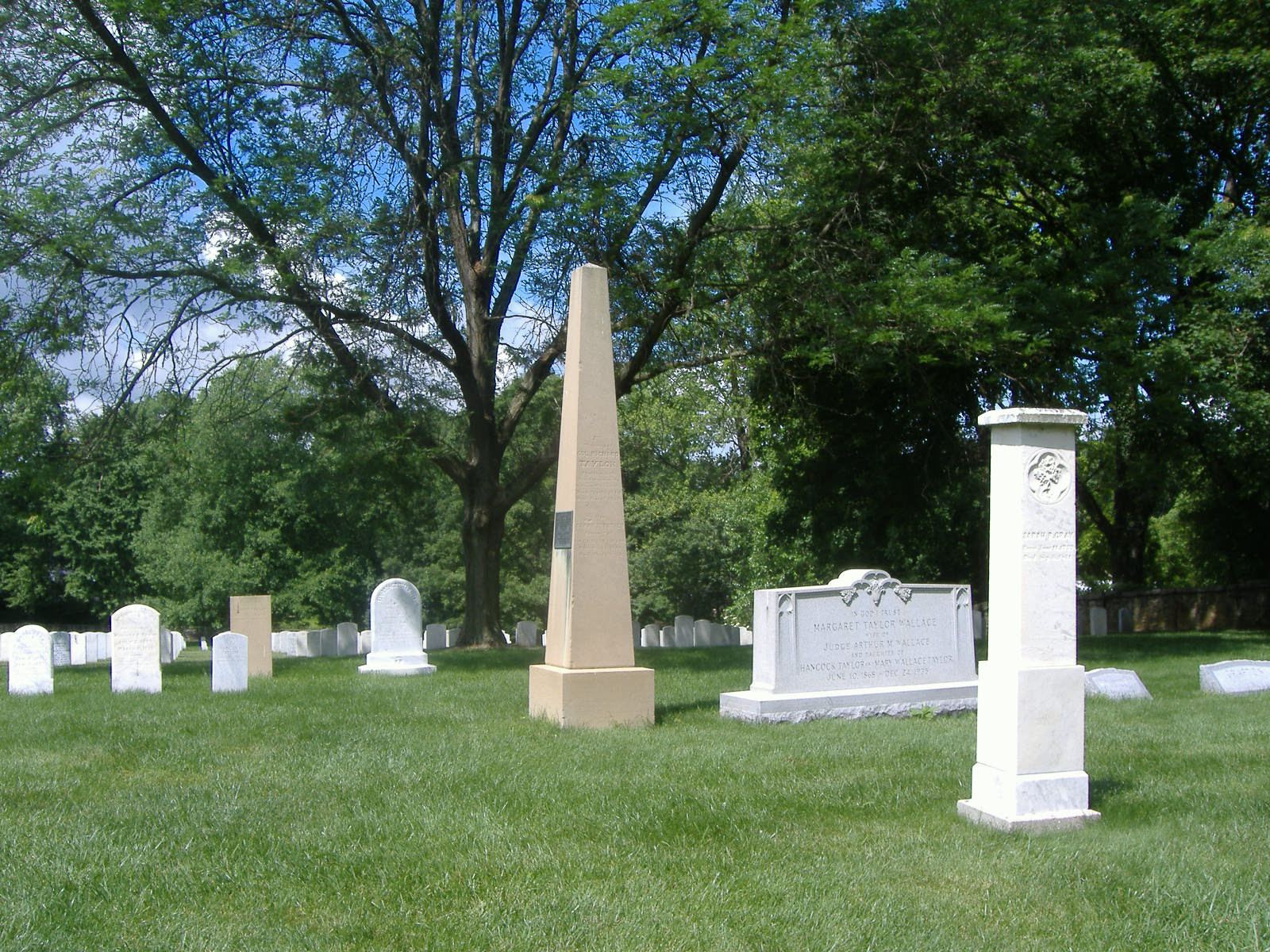
Richard Taylor's grave at Zachary Taylor National Cemetery

By 1800, Taylor had enlarged "Springfield" to 700 acres (2.8 km^{2}) by 1800. He remained active for the remainder of his life in Kentucky politics. He donated 60 acres (240,000 m^{2}) for the creation of Taylorsville, Kentucky, which was named in his honor.

Richard Taylor died in 1829 at the age of 84. He was buried in the family cemetery, now part of the Zachary Taylor National Cemetery.
