= National Register of Historic Places listings in Campbell County, Kentucky =

Location of Campbell County in Kentucky

This is a list of the National Register of Historic Places listings in Campbell County, Kentucky.

This is intended to be a complete list of the properties and districts on the National Register of Historic Places in Campbell County, Kentucky, United States. The locations of National Register properties and districts for which the latitude and longitude coordinates are included below, may be seen in a map.

There are 71 properties and districts listed on the National Register in the county. Another property was once listed but has been removed.

This National Park Service list is complete through NPS recent listings posted August 28, 2026.

== Current listings ==
	Name on the Register	Image	Date listed	Location	City or town	Description
1	Peter Barth Farm		March 9, 1983 (#83002594)	Lower Tug Fork Rd. 39°00′13″N 84°22′44″W	Alexandria vicinity	
2	Baumann House	Baumann House	March 9, 1983 (#83002595)	Four Mile Pike; 38°59′20″N 84°21′49″W	Camp Springs	
3	Bellevue	Bellevue	April 22, 1976 (#76000857)	335 E. 3rd St. 39°05′47″N 84°29′32″W	Newport	Homestead of James Taylor, Jr.
4	Bellevue High School	Bellevue High School	January 9, 1986 (#86000026)	Washington and Center Sts. 39°06′12″N 84°28′46″W	Bellevue	
5	Bishoff House		March 9, 1983 (#83002622)	Eight Mile Rd. 39°00′54″N 84°20′51″W	Camp Springs	
6	Blau's Four Mile House	Blau's Four Mile House	March 9, 1983 (#83002596)	Four Mile Pike; 38°59′49″N 84°21′46″W	Camp Springs	
7	Blenk House	Blenk House	March 9, 1983 (#83002597)	Stonehouse Rd. 38°59′24″N 84°21′25″W	Alexandria vicinity	
8	Bonnie Leslie Historic District		March 5, 2018 (#100002153)	Bounded by Memorial Pkwy., Taylor, Wilson, Berry & Anspaugh Aves. 39°05′45″N 84°28′30″W	Bellevue	
9	John Braun House	John Braun House	March 9, 1983 (#83002598)	Eight Mile Rd. 39°00′17″N 84°21′13″W	Camp Springs	
10	Buena Vista Historic District		February 13, 2020 (#100004978)	Roughly bounded by L&N/CSX RR, Lowell St., 8th St., & Putnam St., plus 700 blk. Columbia St. & 1000 blk. York St. 39°05′11″N 84°29′38″W	Newport	
11	Camp Springs House	Camp Springs House	March 9, 1983 (#83002599)	Four Mile Pike; 39°00′24″N 84°21′59″W	Camp Springs	
12	Campbell County Courthouse at Newport	Campbell County Courthouse at Newport	March 8, 1988 (#88000181)	330 York St. 39°05′32″N 84°29′53″W	Newport	
13	Cote Brillante Historic District	Cote Brillante Historic District	August 3, 2005 (#05000791)	Portions of E. 10th, E. 11th Sts., Park Ave., Camryn Court, Vine, Center, Prospect, and Miller Sts., and Wiedemann Place; 39°05′22″N 84°28′52″W	Newport	
14	Dayton City Hall		January 21, 2022 (#100007373)	636 6th Ave. 39°06′49″N 84°28′17″W	Dayton	
15	Dayton High School	Dayton High School	July 18, 1985 (#85001579)	8th and Walnut Sts. 39°06′34″N 84°28′37″W	Dayton	
16	Doyle Country Club	Doyle Country Club	March 13, 2017 (#100000735)	37 Mary Ingalls Hwy. 39°06′46″N 84°27′20″W	Dayton	
17	East Row Historic District	East Row Historic District	August 25, 1983 (#83002600)	Roughly bounded by the C&O railroad line, 6th, Saratoga, and Oak Sts. 39°05′28″N 84°29′13″W	Newport	
18	John Faha House		March 9, 1983 (#83002601)	Lower Tug Fork Rd. 39°00′17″N 84°21′13″W	Alexandria	
19	Fairfield Avenue Historic District	Fairfield Avenue Historic District	February 22, 1988 (#88000100)	Fairfield Ave. between LaFayette Ave. and O'Fallon; 39°06′29″N 84°28′51″W	Bellevue	
20	Foote-Fister Mansion	Foote-Fister Mansion	February 24, 1988 (#88000099)	801 Lincoln Rd. 39°06′12″N 84°28′23″W	Bellevue	
21	Fort Thomas Commercial District	Fort Thomas Commercial District	July 10, 2008 (#08000003)	1011-1312 S. Ft. Thomas Ave, 9-11 River Rd., and 12-28 Midway Ct. 39°03′51″N 84°26′49″W	Fort Thomas	
22	Fort Thomas Military Reservation District	Fort Thomas Military Reservation District	May 15, 1986 (#86001103)	Roughly bounded by Pearson, Alexander and Cochran Aves., River Rd., and S. Fort Thomas Ave. 39°03′55″N 84°26′39″W	Fort Thomas	
23	Fort Thomas Women's Club		March 14, 2023 (#100008738)	8 North Fort Thomas Ave. 39°04′44″N 84°26′54″W	Fort Thomas	
24	Grant's Lick School		August 31, 2026 (#100013335)	944 Clay Ridge Rd; 38°51′34″N 84°23′50″W	Alexandria vicinity	
25	Grote Manufacturing Company Building (CP337)	Grote Manufacturing Company Building (CP337)	February 28, 2019 (#100003473)	239 Grandview Ave. 39°06′03″N 84°28′44″W	Bellevue	
26	Gubser-Schuchter Farm	Gubser-Schuchter Farm	March 9, 1983 (#83002602)	Four Mile Pike Area; 38°59′01″N 84°21′47″W	Camp Springs	
27	Heiert Farm		March 9, 1983 (#83002603)	Eight Mile Rd; 39°00′18″N 84°20′37″W	Camp Springs	
28	Elijah Herndon House		October 29, 1983 (#83002604)	Northwest of California on Washington Trace Rd. 38°55′37″N 84°17′40″W	California	
29	Highland Country Club	Highland Country Club	August 15, 2024 (#100010708)	931 Alexandria Pike; 39°03′42″N 84°27′15″W	Fort Thomas	
30	Hilbert Farm		March 9, 1983 (#83002605)	Gunkel Rd. 39°00′39″N 84°20′18″W	Camp Springs	
31	Harlan Hubbard Studio		August 4, 2016 (#16000493)	129 Highland Ave. 39°04′37″N 84°27′08″W	Fort Thomas	
32	Kort Grocery	Kort Grocery	March 9, 1983 (#83002606)	Four Mile Pike; 39°00′01″N 84°21′49″W	Camp Springs	
33	Frederich Kremer House		March 9, 1983 (#83002607)	317 Poplar Ridge Rd. 38°58′59″N 84°22′25″W	Alexandria	
34	Matthias Kremer House	Matthias Kremer House	March 9, 1983 (#83002608)	Corner of Four Mile Pike and Stonehouse Rd. 38°59′35″N 84°21′45″W	Camp Springs	
35	Nicholas Kremer House	Nicholas Kremer House	March 9, 1983 (#83002609)	Stonehouse Rd; 38°59′21″N 84°21′17″W	Camp Springs	
36	Leick House	Leick House	March 9, 1983 (#83002610)	Four Mile Pike; 38°59′42″N 84°21′39″W	Camp Springs	
37	Mansion Hill Historic District	Mansion Hill Historic District	July 17, 1980 (#80001493)	Roughly bounded by Interstate 471, Washington Ave., 2nd and 6th Sts.; also roughly bounded by Washington Ave., 6th, Saratoga, and 3rd Sts. 39°05′44″N 84°29′30″W	Newport	Second set of addresses represents a boundary increase
38	Marianne Theater	Marianne Theater	March 17, 2015 (#15000081)	609 Fairfield Ave. 39°06′30″N 84°28′52″W	Bellevue	
39	Monmouth Street Historic District	Monmouth Street Historic District	July 25, 1996 (#96000794)	Monmouth St. between 3rd and 11th Sts. 39°05′22″N 84°29′39″W	Newport	
40	Newport and Cincinnati Bridge	Newport and Cincinnati Bridge	April 17, 2001 (#01000363)	Over the Ohio River; 39°05′41″N 84°29′40″W	Newport	Also known as the Newport Southbank Bridge; extends into Cincinnati, Ohio
41	Newport Courthouse Square Historic District	Newport Courthouse Square Historic District	February 5, 2010 (#09001306)	York St., Court Pl., and 4th St. 39°05′32″N 84°29′49″W	Newport	
42	Ort-Heeb Farm		March 9, 1983 (#83002611)	Four Mile Pike; 38°58′48″N 84°22′01″W	Alexandria	
43	Posey Flats	Posey Flats	January 29, 1987 (#86003730)	101-103 E. 3rd St. 39°05′40″N 84°29′45″W	Newport	Destroyed; now the site of Newport on the Levee
44	Reitman House		March 9, 1983 (#83002612)	Reitman Rd. 38°59′43″N 84°22′30″W	Alexandria vicinity	
45	Reitman's St. Joseph House	Reitman's St. Joseph House	March 9, 1983 (#83002613)	Four Mile Pike; 38°59′43″N 84°21′48″W	Camp Springs	
46	Andrew Ritter Farm		March 9, 1983 (#83002614)	Four Mile Pike; 38°59′00″N 84°21′29″W	Alexandria	
47	E.O. Robinson House	E.O. Robinson House	August 2, 2017 (#100001420)	105 Regency Ct. 39°02′06″N 84°26′50″W	Highland Heights	
48	Roth Farm		March 9, 1983 (#83002615)	Off Nine Mile Rd. 39°00′45″N 84°21′22″W	Camp Springs	
49	Sacred Heart Church	Sacred Heart Church	August 13, 1974 (#74000856)	337 Taylor Ave. 39°06′10″N 84°28′48″W	Bellevue	
50	St. John's Lutheran Cemetery	St. John's Lutheran Cemetery	March 9, 1983 (#83002617)	Upper Tug Fork Rd. 39°00′51″N 84°22′58″W	Alexandria vicinity	
51	St. John the Baptist Roman Catholic Church	St. John the Baptist Roman Catholic Church	August 11, 1980 (#80001495)	641 Licking Pike / 1309 Johns Hill Rd. 39°02′48″N 84°29′07″W	Wilder	
52	St. Joseph's Catholic Church and Cemetery	St. Joseph's Catholic Church and Cemetery	May 16, 1983 (#83002618)	Four Mile Pike; 38°59′38″N 84°21′42″W	Alexandria vicinity	
53	St. Paul's Episcopal Church	St. Paul's Episcopal Church	November 25, 1980 (#80001494)	15 Court Pl. 39°05′34″N 84°29′49″W	Newport	
54	St. Vincent de Paul School	St. Vincent de Paul School	October 11, 1989 (#89001598)	117 Main St. 39°04′50″N 84°29′13″W	Newport	
55	Salem Methodist Episcopal Church and Parsonage	Salem Methodist Episcopal Church and Parsonage	March 27, 1986 (#86000608)	810 York St. 39°05′18″N 84°29′35″W	Newport	
56	August Sauer House	August Sauer House	August 18, 1997 (#97000873)	832 Central Ave. 39°05′11″N 84°29′42″W	Newport	
57	Sauser Farm		March 9, 1983 (#83002616)	Upper Tug Fork Rd. 39°00′56″N 84°23′01″W	Alexandria	
58	Joseph Seiter House	Joseph Seiter House	April 3, 1986 (#86000617)	307-309 Berry Ave. 39°06′11″N 84°29′02″W	Bellevue	
59	Southgate-Parker-Maddux House	Southgate-Parker-Maddux House	August 29, 1977 (#77000605)	24 E. 3rd St. 39°05′36″N 84°29′47″W	Newport	
60	John Stevens House		August 14, 2024 (#100010707)	2150 Wagoner Road; 38°54′17″N 84°20′18″W	California	
61	Taylor's Daughters Historic District	Taylor's Daughters Historic District	February 24, 1988 (#88000101)	Roughly bounded by O'Fallon Ave., Locust St., Retreat St., Clark St., Chen Ave., and Fairfield Ave. 39°06′11″N 84°28′47″W	Bellevue	
62	Terrace Gardens		October 30, 2023 (#100009534)	1300 Dayton Avenue; 39°06′30″N 84°28′06″W	Dayton	
63	Third Street Motor Car Company Building	Third Street Motor Car Company Building	December 5, 2002 (#02001465)	216 E. 3rd St. 39°05′42″N 84°29′38″W	Newport	
64	Tiemeyer House	Tiemeyer House	March 9, 1983 (#83002619)	KY 8; 39°01′40″N 84°21′16″W	Melbourne vicinity	
65	Trutschell House		March 9, 1983 (#83002620)	KY 8; 39°01′32″N 84°21′00″W	Melbourne	
66	U.S. Army Fort Thomas Mess Hall	U.S. Army Fort Thomas Mess Hall	March 13, 1980 (#80001492)	Cochran Ave. 39°04′05″N 84°26′40″W	Fort Thomas	
67	Uebel House		March 9, 1983 (#83002621)	Upper Tug Fork Rd. 38°59′34″N 84°23′08″W	Alexandria	
68	Walter House	Walter House	December 11, 2007 (#83004584)	6570 Vineyard Ln. 38°59′51″N 84°19′35″W	Melbourne	
69	John Weber Farm	John Weber Farm	July 11, 2007 (#07000672)	6231 Four Mile Rd. 39°00′37″N 84°22′11″W	Camp Springs	
70	Charles Wiedemann House	Charles Wiedemann House	August 18, 1984 (#84001401)	1102 Park Ave. 39°05′20″N 84°28′57″W	Newport	
71	York Street Historic District	York Street Historic District	May 26, 1995 (#95000640)	York St. from 7th St. to 10th St.; also 400-629 York Street, 904-1032 Orchard Street, 11-40 East 9th Street. 39°05′15″N 84°29′34″W	Newport	Second set of addresses represent a boundary increase approved April 23, 2024

== Former listing ==
	Name on the Register	Image	Date listed	Date removed	Location	City or town	Description
1	Thomas and Mary Jones House		January 17, 1976 (#76000858)	September 26, 1979	15th and Monmouth Sts.	Newport	

== See also ==
- List of National Historic Landmarks in Kentucky
- National Register of Historic Places listings in Kentucky
