= Walter House =

Walter House may refer to:

- Martin Walter House, Pueblo, Colorado, listed on the National Register of Historic Places (NRHP) in Colorado
- Walter-Gimble House, Davenport, Iowa, listed on the NRHP
- Lowell E. Walter House, Quasqueton, Iowa, listed on the NRHP
- Walter House (Melbourne, Kentucky), listed on the NRHP
- Peter D. Walter House, Lockport, New York, listed on the NRHP
- Henry Walter House, Blainsport, Pennsylvania, listed on the NRHP
- John Walter Farmstead, Export, Pennsylvania, listed on the NRHP
- Walter-Heins House, Eau Claire, Wisconsin, listed on the NRHP in Wisconsin
- Luther and Anna Walter Boathouse, Minocqua, Wisconsin, listed on the NRHP in Wisconsin

== See also ==
- Walters House (disambiguation)
