= Camp Springs =

Camp Springs may refer to a location in the United States:

- Camp Springs, Kentucky, an unincorporated community
  - Camp Springs House, a historic inn
- Camp Springs, Maryland, a census-designated place
  - Camp Springs Army Base, original name for Andrews Air Force Base
- Camp Springs, North Carolina, an unincorporated community
