= St. Anne Woods and Wetlands =

Conservation area in Melbourne, Campbell County, Kentucky

- St. Anne Woods and Wetlands

- Location within Kentucky
- Location: Melbourne, Campbell County, Kentucky, United States
- Nearest city: Cincinnati, Ohio
- Coordinates: 39°2′3″N 84°22′16″W
- Area: 155 acres (63 ha)
- Established: 2013
- Governing body: Campbell County Conservation District

St. Anne Woods and Wetlands is a 155-acre (63 ha) conservation area along the Ohio River in Melbourne, Campbell County, Kentucky. The site lies within the Outer Bluegrass ecoregion and comprises open and closed canopy wetlands, upland old-growth forest, secondary forests, and associated grasslands. It is recognized as one of the last remaining undisturbed wetland complexes along the Ohio River in Northern Kentucky.

The property is protected by a conservation easement held by the Commonwealth of Kentucky and managed by the Campbell County Conservation District. Research and education programming is conducted in partnership with Northern Kentucky University's Research and Education Field Station (REFS).

== History ==
The site was first formally documented by ecologist E. Lucy Braun, who in 1916 described it as "the best depression forest on the Ohio River floodplain." Braun, the first female president of the Ecological Society of America and one of the first female professors at the University of Cincinnati, referred to the site in her research as "Melbourne Woods."

The Sisters of Divine Providence, a Roman Catholic community of the Congregation of Divine Providence, established their American presence in Northern Kentucky in 1889 and acquired the Melbourne estate in October 1908. The community constructed the St. Anne Convent on the property in 1919, and the surrounding woods and wetlands were maintained as part of the convent campus. By 1945 the order had formalized stewardship of the woods and wetlands, treating the land as what they described as "a gift of God's Providence" and prohibiting development. Beginning in the early 2000s, the Sisters partnered with Northern Kentucky University, Thomas More University, Xavier University, and other institutions to support ecological research and environmental education on the site. In 2008, a $23,000 NKU Community Partners Grant funded the development of a public trail system and informational kiosks in the southern wetlands section.

In 2012, the Sisters announced the sale of the convent buildings and retreat center to the Diocese of Covington, retaining the Holy Family Infirmary and cemetery; the woods and wetlands portion of the property was to be sold separately to a conservation buyer. In September 2013, the Campbell County Conservation District acquired the woods and wetlands using funding from the Kentucky Heritage Land Conservation Fund, which is supported by revenue from nature license plate sales, the state portion of the unmined minerals tax, and environmental fines. A conservation easement was transferred to the Commonwealth of Kentucky at the same time, permanently restricting development of the site. The Conservation District subsequently hired Amy Winkler, a former NKU undergraduate researcher at the site, as its first coordinator. Plans to expand public access to the upland forest section were deferred after a 2016 biological inventory documented host plants associated with the declining American copper butterfly in areas designated for a planned parking lot.

== Geography and ecology ==
The conservation area sits on the Ohio River floodplain within the Outer Bluegrass ecoregion, bounded by Kentucky Route 8 and a railway corridor. The site is divided into multiple management units, including a southern wetlands section accessible to the public via a signed trail loop from Anderson Lane, and additional forested and meadow sections that remain closed to general access.

The depression forest is dominated by tree species adapted to seasonal flooding, including pin oak, eastern cottonwood, American sycamore, green ash, and red maple. Adjacent upland areas support a regenerating second-growth forest of sassafras, black cherry, and tulip poplar on land previously cleared for cultivation and pasture, as well as a remnant grove of mature American beech preserved historically for mast production. The native understory includes spicebush and pawpaw.

=== Invasive species and ecological research ===
The understory has been significantly affected by Amur honeysuckle, an invasive shrub that forms dense thickets and leafs out earlier and longer than native species. Research conducted in the wetland forest by Richard L. Boyce, Richard D. Durtsche, and S. Lincoln Fugal of Northern Kentucky University, published in the journal Biological Invasions in 2012, used Granier thermal dissipation and heat balance probes to measure transpiration in invaded and uninvaded plots. The study found that L. maackii transpiration could account for up to 6.0% of total tree and vine transpiration at heavily invaded sites, equivalent to roughly 10% of stream flow draining the study area, with implications for the hydroperiod of ephemeral ponds used as amphibian breeding habitat. Other invasive species documented at the site include multiflora rose and Callery pear.

In 2012, a wetland creation and restoration project added new open wetland areas through excavation and the construction of berms intended to mimic natural depression features. These constructed sites have served as long-term study plots for plant colonization and the comparative success of seeded versus naturally recruited vegetation.

== Wildlife ==
Pre-acquisition biological inventories conducted for the Office of Kentucky Nature Preserves documented 72 bird species, 21 mammal species, 11 amphibian species, three reptile species, and 12 species of dragonfly and damselfly at the site, the last representing a significant increase over previously identified Campbell County records. A single night of acoustic survey identified eight bat species, including the federally listed Indiana bat and the gray bat.

The site supports diverse amphibian populations dependent on its ephemeral ponds, which exclude predatory fish and provide critical breeding habitat. Documented species include Jefferson's salamander, wood frog, streamside salamander, ravine salamander, green frog, spring peeper, and American toad. Mammals observed at the site include white-tailed deer, red fox and gray fox, coyote, raccoon, muskrat, and North American beaver.

== Research and education ==
Northern Kentucky University's Research and Education Field Station (REFS) maintains a memorandum of understanding with the Campbell County Conservation District for the use of the site in biological research and educational programming. The field station, a small house converted into laboratory and conference space adjacent to the conservation area, opened in May 2017 and serves as the operational base for ongoing research projects. Long-term studies include amphibian population monitoring led by NKU biologist Richard Durtsche, ongoing since 2001, as well as floristic survey work conducted by Maggie Whitson, director of NKU's John W. Thieret Herbarium. Collaborative research is conducted with Thomas More University and Xavier University. The site hosts K to 12 environmental education programs, university coursework, and public engagement events such as Nature Adventure Day.

== Public access ==
The southern wetlands loop trail is open to the public during daylight hours and is accessed from a parking area on Anderson Lane in Melbourne. The trail features a main trailhead kiosk and six numbered interpretive stations covering understory plants, the forest canopy, the depression wetland, ecological succession, the mature beech grove, and the 2012 wetland restoration site. Boardwalk segments cross the wettest portions of the trail. Pets must be leashed; hunting, fishing, camping, and the collection of plants or wildlife are prohibited. Other sections of the property are reserved for ongoing research and remain closed to general access.

== See also ==
- St. Anne Convent
- List of Kentucky state nature preserves
- E. Lucy Braun
