= Grace Methodist Episcopal Church (Newport, Kentucky) =

Grace Methodist Episcopal Church was formed for English speaking Methodists in Newport to worship. It is located at 111 East 6th Street in Newport, Kentucky.

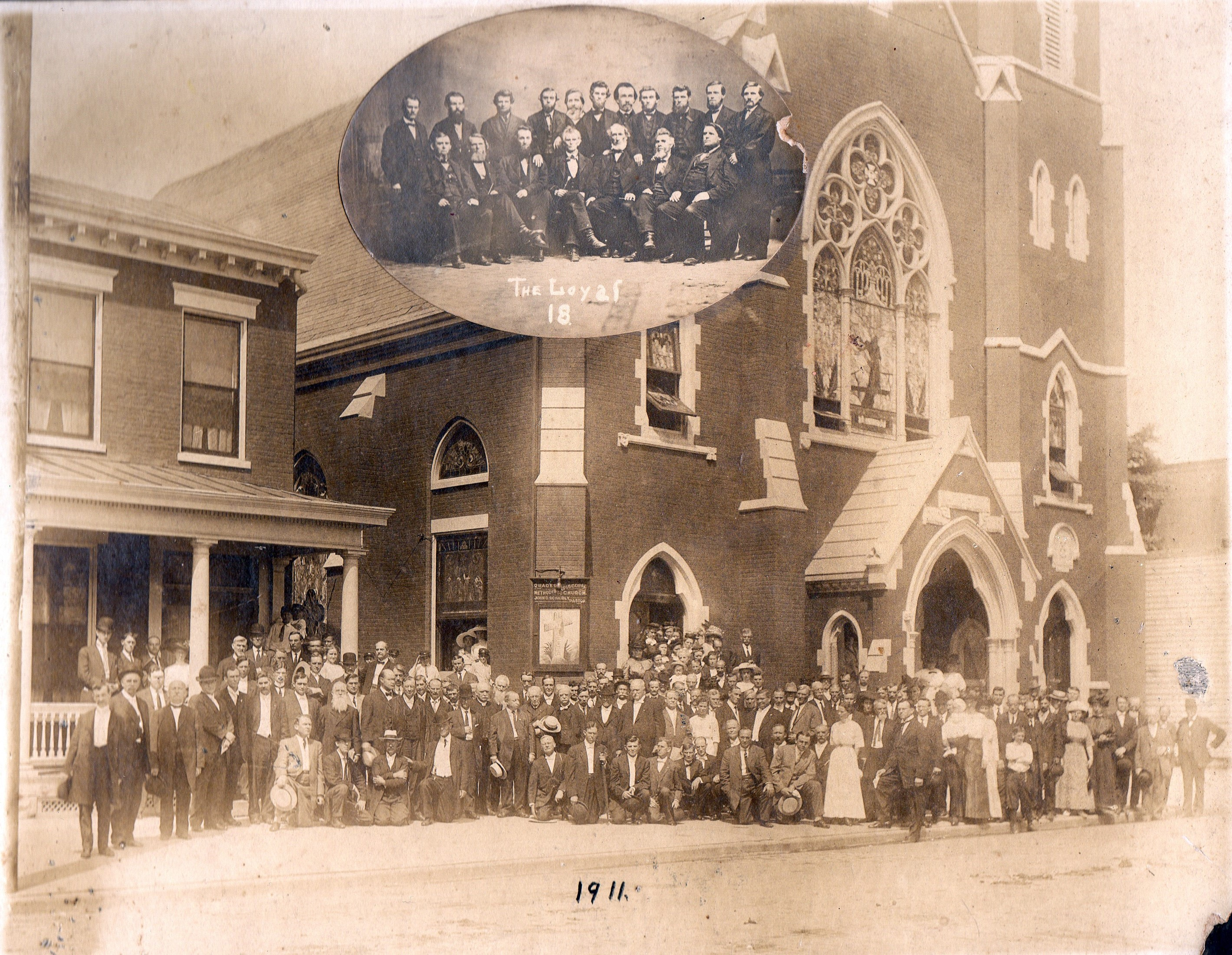
1911 Grace Methodist Episcopal Church (Newport, Kentucky)

In 1806, a small class of Methodists was formed in Newport at the house of Jonathan Huling, the tavern located at the southeast corner of Fourth and Columbia streets. The members were: Dr. Thomas Hinde, Mary Todd Hinde, Patsey Hinde, Ann Winston Hinde Southgate, Maria Lindsey, Clarissa Hulin, Eliza Butler, Susanna Butler, Rachel Ritterhouse, Margaret Martin, Ann R S Martin and Susanna W Martin. Out of this meeting grew the first Methodist Church in Newport.

On May 17, 1827, an agreement with William Bryan, was recorded for the erection of a "Methodist Meeting House 30x40 feet constructed of brick, with side walls 11 feet high". The time given for the completion of the building "on or before August next". This became the first Methodist Episcopal Church in Newport, built on the lot where Saint Paul's Episcopal Church now stands, 7 Court Place, opposite the Campbell County Court House. In 1844, the vestry of Saint Paul's Church bought the small brick church building on Court Place for $500.

The Grace M.E. Church was built in 1866, just after the American Civil War. Reverend W.F.T Spuill was Pastor in 1867–1868. The Women's Foreign Missionary Society was formed in 1880.

The church lost its steeple to a tornado on July 7, 1915. After another tornado struck the Salem United Methodist Church in 1986, the two churches merged. The church was closed for several years, until it was turned into a music venue / nightclub in 2012.

== Current use ==
In the spring of 2012, the owners of The Southgate House began renovating Grace Methodist Episcopal Church, into a nightclub and music venue, in preparation for moving locations. The new venue was christened The Southgate House Revival and opened its doors on October 9, 2012.

The club comprises three music venues, one each in the main sanctuary, original sanctuary and upstairs theater. The new venues have been named "The Sanctuary," "The Lounge," and "The Revival Room" respectively.

The pipe organ, which was created by Johann Koehnken, is still in functioning condition and the owners plan to restore and renovate the organ for future use.

== Noted members ==
- Dr. Thomas Hinde
- Thomas S. Hinde
- Oliver Wyatt Root – there is a large stained glass memorial window for him in the church
- Ira Root
