= Walters House =

Walters House may refer to:

in the United States

(sorted by state)

- Walters Ranch, Healdsburg, California, listed on the National Register of Historic Places (NRHP) in Sonoma County
- Walters-Davis House, Toccoa, Georgia, listed on the NRHP in Stephens County
- Daniel and Maude Walters House, Manhattan, Kansas, listed on the NRHP in Riley County
- Thomas Walters House, Hodgenville, Kentucky, listed on the NRHP in LaRue County
- Dr. Jefferson A. Walters House, Dayton, Ohio, listed on the NRHP in Montgomery County
- Paul Londershausen House (also known as the Walters Residence), Dayton, Oregon, listed on the NRHP in Yamhill County
- Solomon Walters House, Bruce, South Dakota, listed on the NRHP in Brookings County
- Walters House (Morgantown, West Virginia), listed on the NRHP in Monongalia County

== See also ==
- Walter House (disambiguation)
