= Earl Murray =

American football player (1926–1994)

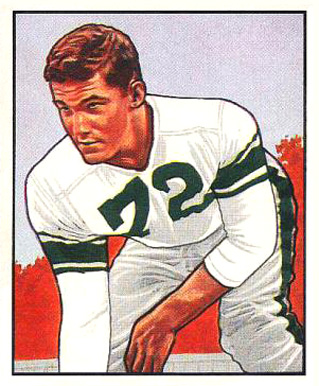
- Murray on a 1950 Bowman football card

No. 30, 62, 72
- Positions: Guard, Tackle

Personal information
- Born: July 16, 1926; Dayton, Kentucky, U.S.
- Died: July 14, 1994 (aged 67); Midlothian, Virginia, U.S.
- Listed height: 6 ft 2 in (1.88 m)
- Listed weight: 240 lb (109 kg)

Career information
- High school: Dayton
- College: Purdue (1946–1949)
- NFL draft: 1950: 4th round, 41st overall pick

Career history
- Baltimore Colts (1950); New York Giants (1951); Pittsburgh Steelers (1952)

Career NFL statistics
- Games played: 35
- Games started: 28
- Fumble recoveries: 3
- Stats at Pro Football Reference

Earl William Murray (July 16, 1926 – July 14, 1994) was an American professional football guard who played three seasons in the National Football League (NFL) with the Baltimore Colts, New York Giants and Pittsburgh Steelers. He was selected by the Colts in the fourth round of the 1950 NFL draft after playing college football at Purdue University.

== Early life and college ==
Earl William Murray was born on July 16, 1926, in Dayton, Kentucky. He attended Dayton High School in Dayton.

He was a member of the Purdue Boilermakers of Purdue University from 1946 to 1949.

== Professional career ==
Murray was selected by the Baltimore Colts in the fourth round, with the 41st overall pick, of the 1950 NFL draft. He played in all 12 games, starting nine, for the Colts during the 1950 season and recovered one fumble. The Colts finished the year with a 1–11 record.

The Colts folded after the 1950 season, and the NFL placed their players in the 1951 NFL draft. Murray was selected by the New York Giants in the 10th round, with the 122nd overall pick, of that year's draft. He appeared in all 12 games, starting eight, for the Giants in 1951, catching one pass for negative four yards and recovering two fumbles. The Giants finished the season with a 9–2–1 record. He was released on September 25, 1952.

Murray was signed by the Pittsburgh Steelers on October 1, 1952. He played in 11 games, starting nine, for the Steelers during the 1952 season and returned one kick for 14 yards. The Steelers 5–7 that year. Murray was waived on September 22, 1953.

== Personal life ==
Bach served in the United States Marine Corps. He died on July 14, 1994, in Midlothian, Virginia.
