= Baumann House =

Historic house in Kentucky, United States

- U.S. National Register of Historic Places
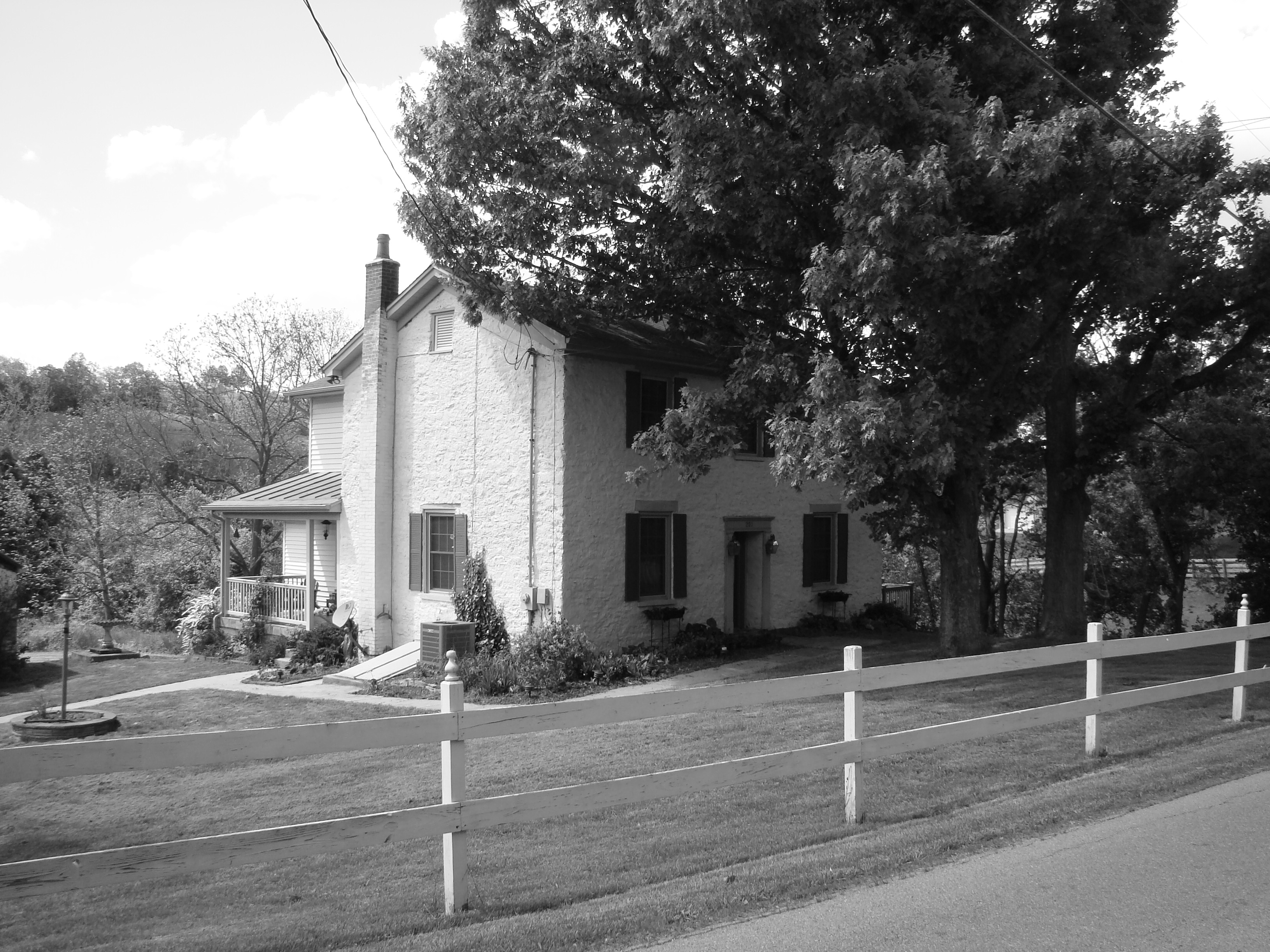
- Baumann House, 2008.

- Location within Kentucky Location within the United States
- Location: Camp Springs, Kentucky
- Coordinates: 38°59′20″N 84°21′49″W
- Built: c.1852
- MPS: German Settlement, Four Mile Creek Area TR
- NRHP reference No.: 83002595
- Added to NRHP: March 9, 1983

Baumann House, also known as the Martz House, is a historic property located on Four Mile Road in Camp Springs, Kentucky, a rural area of Campbell County, Kentucky. The house was built in c.1852 as part of a settlement of German immigrants. The structure was added to the United States National Register of Historic Places in 1983.

It is a two-story three-bay stone house, built c.1852.
