= Blenk House =

Historic house in Kentucky, United States

- Blenke House
- U.S. National Register of Historic Places
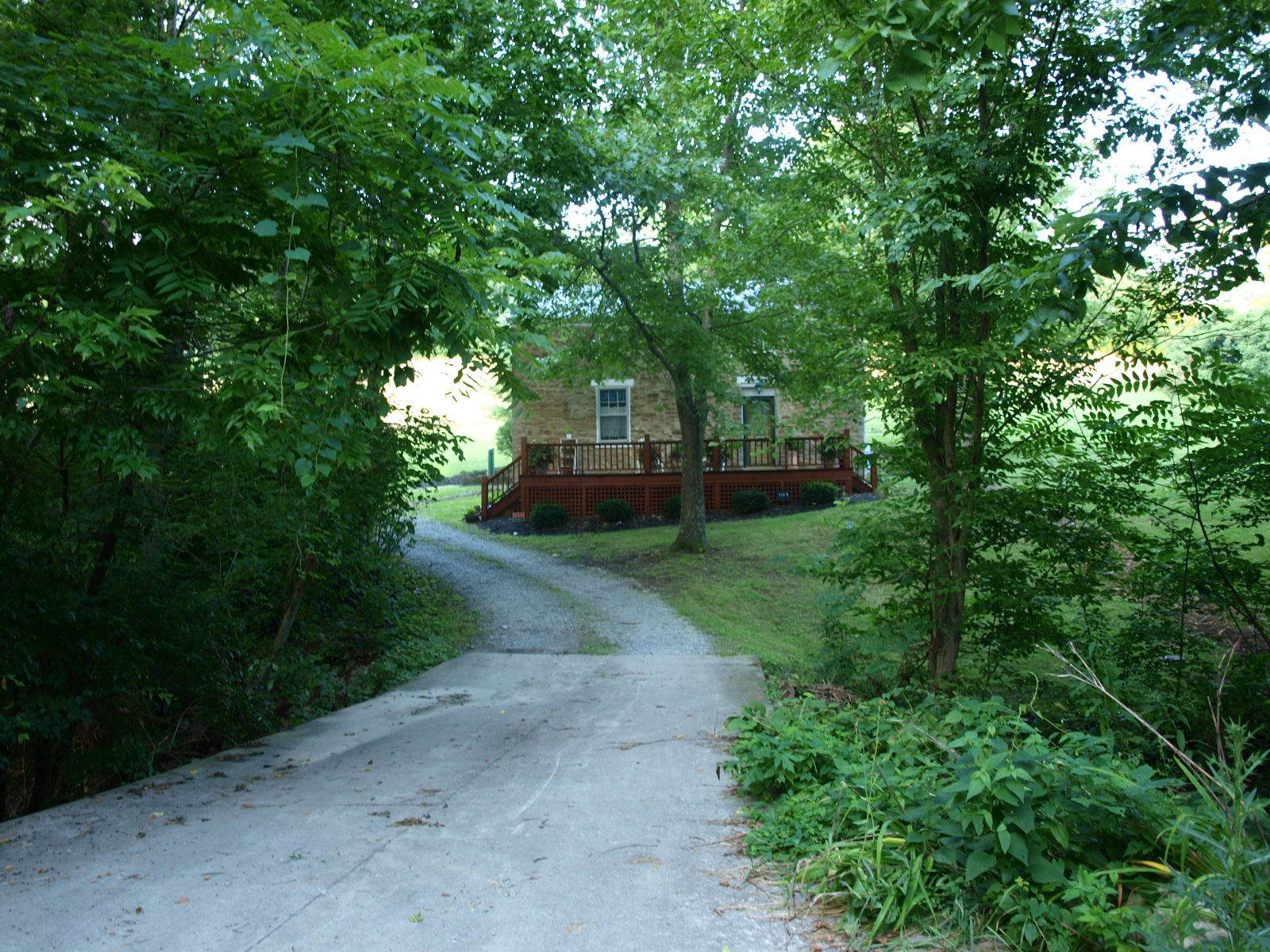

- Location within Kentucky Location within the United States
- Nearest city: Alexandria, Kentucky
- Coordinates: 38°59′24″N 84°21′25″W
- Area: less than one acre
- Built: c.1870
- Architectural style: Vernacular
- MPS: German Settlement, Four Mile Creek Area TR
- NRHP reference No.: 83002597
- Added to NRHP: March 9, 1983

Blenke House, on Stonehouse Rd. near Camp Springs, Kentucky, was built in c.1870. It was listed on the National Register of Historic Places in 1983.
