= St. Paul's Episcopal Church (Newport, Kentucky) =

Historic church in Kentucky, United States

- U.S. National Register of Historic Places
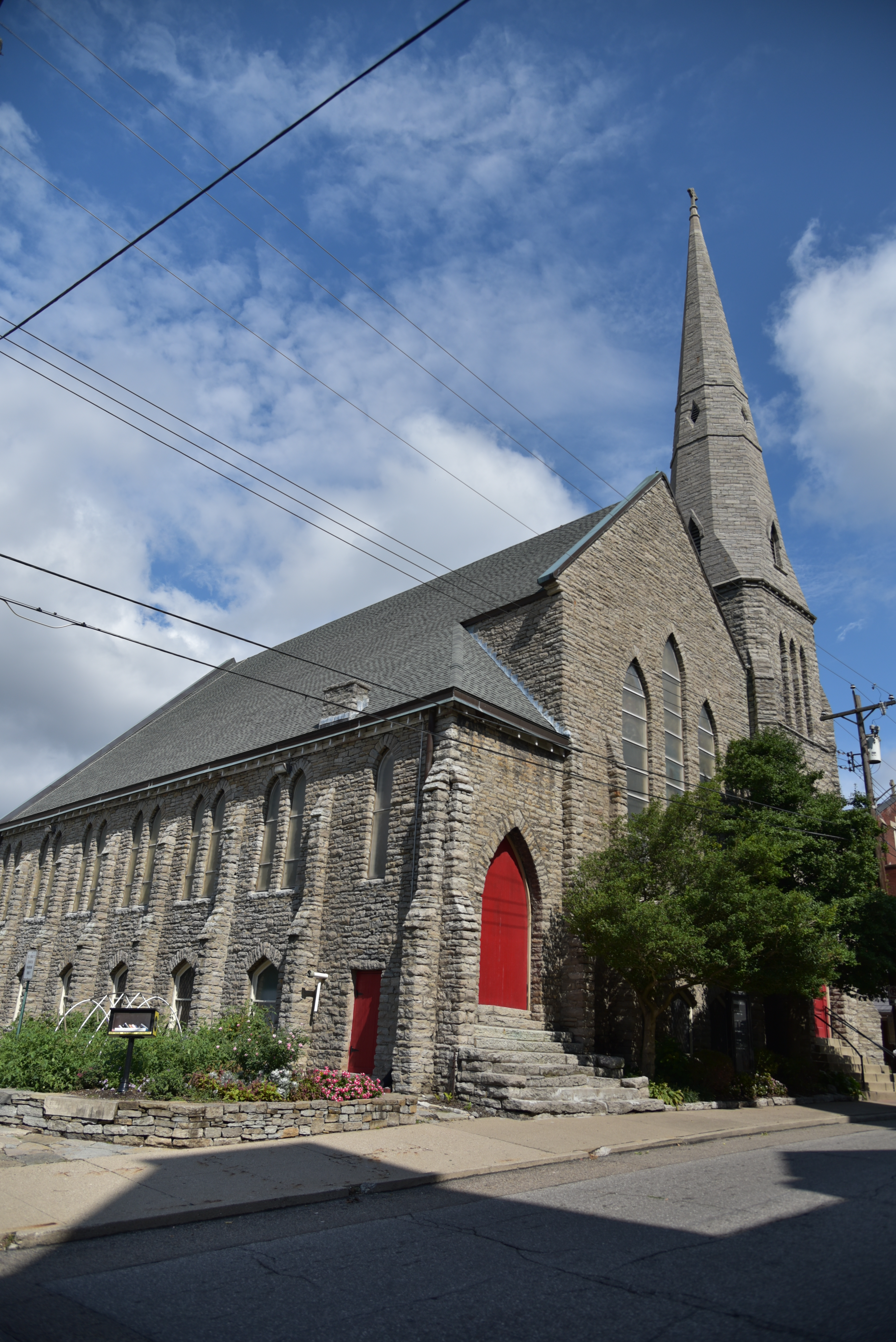

- Location within Kentucky Location within the United States
- Location: 7 Court Place; Newport, Kentucky
- Coordinates: 39°5′34″N 84°29′49″W
- Built: 1871
- Architect: J.R. Neff
- Architectural style: Gothic Revival
- NRHP reference No.: 80001494
- Added to NRHP: November 25, 1980

St. Paul's Episcopal Church, built in 1871, is an historic Episcopal church located at 7 Court Place at York Street in Newport, Kentucky, in the United States. On November 25, 1980, it was added to the National Register of Historic Places.

== History ==
The church was founded on Easter Sunday in 1844, with the assistance of the Rev. Dr. Nicholas Hamner Cobbs, who was then rector of St. Paul's Church in Cincinnati. He helped "the Church-minded people in Newport" to organize their new congregation and the vestry considered him to be St. Paul's founder. Six months later the Rev. Mr. Cobbs was elected Bishop of Alabama.

Later in 1844, the vestry bought the small Methodist brick church building on Court Place for $500. The Methodist Meeting House was 30 by 40 feet (9 m × 12 m), with side walls 11 feet (3 m) high. In the front of the Methodist Church interior of the building there was a low gallery, without handrails, for the use of slaves, who came to meetings with their masters."

In 1845 St. Paul's was admitted into union with the Episcopal Diocese of Kentucky. In 1871 the cornerstone of the present St. Paul's was laid on the site of the old brick Methodist church. It is a Kentucky landmark designed by J. R. Neff. On a Sunday in August 1873, the bell in the tower first summoned parishioners to Morning Prayer.

The cost of construction rose from $19,452 to over $33,000; the church was consecrated in 1888. Although the congregation continued to grow (by 1894 it was the largest parish in the Diocese), the vestry struggled with debt well into the twentieth century. The church and its people have weathered natural disasters of every magnitude, including an earthquake in 1880, the record-breaking Ohio River floods of 1884 and 1937, and the tornadoes of 1915 and 1986.

Here worshipped Gen. James Taylor Jr., War of 1812; Henry Stanbery, who defended President Andrew Johnson at his impeachment trial, 1868; Brent Spence, 37 years in the United States Congress, a lifetime member.

Today, St. Paul's has an active congregation. The Very Reverend S. Matthew Young, SCP serves as Rector. He is also the Dean of the Cathedral Church of St. George the Martyr at the Cathedral Domain in the Diocese of Lexington. He also serves as the Chaplain for the Newport Fire/EMS Department, Newport Police Department, and Fire Department Bellevue/Dayton.

The congregation has now regained parish status in the Episcopal Church. In addition, St. Paul's operates the St. Paul's Food Pantry in Newport serving hundreds of households monthly. Holy Eucharist is celebrated at St. Paul's at 8:30 a.m. and 10:30 a.m. and holy days as announced.
