= Doyle Country Club =

- U.S. National Register of Historic Places
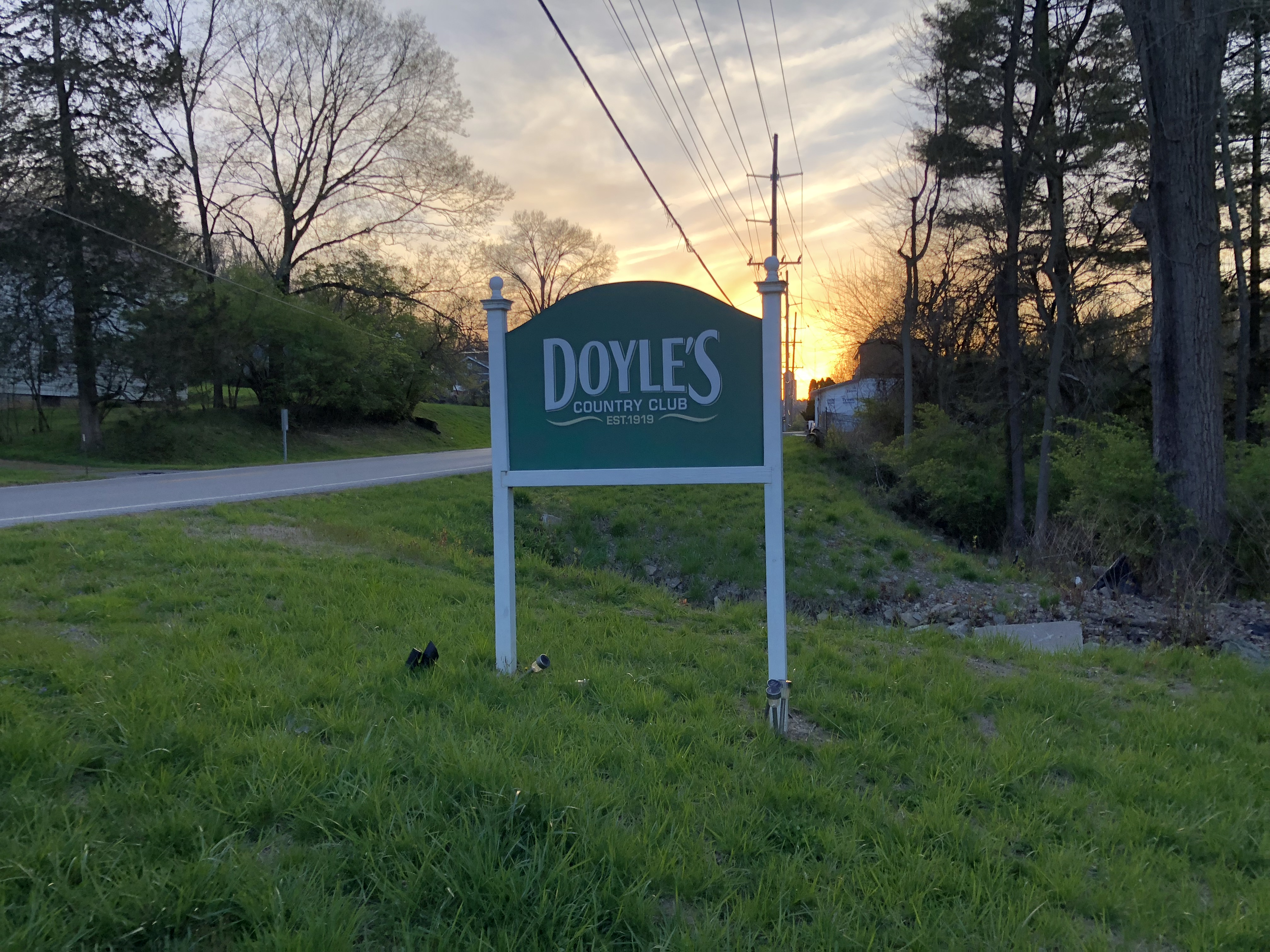
- Doyle Country Club, 2018

- Location within Kentucky Location within the United States
- Location: Dayton, Kentucky
- Coordinates: 39°6′46.03″N 84°27′19.66″W
- Built: 1919
- NRHP reference No.: 100000735
- Added to NRHP: March 13, 2017

The Doyle Country Club (aka Doyle's Country Club or simply the Doyle Club, formerly Clark's Grove) is a historic, privately owned club located on Mary Ingles Highway in Dayton, Kentucky, a rural area of Campbell County, Kentucky. A dance pavilion and 16 cabins are on a beachfront property on the shore of the Ohio River, it is the last surviving river camp community along the Ohio River Valley.

== History ==
The club was incorporated in Dayton, Kentucky in 1919, but had already been active for several years. During a January 1913 flood of the Ohio River, The Cincinnati Enquirer reported all of the cottages erected by the Club under water, and following the Great Dayton Flood the same year, "five or six cottages were swept off their foundations". The broader area was a popular and controversial swimming area, per the local history.

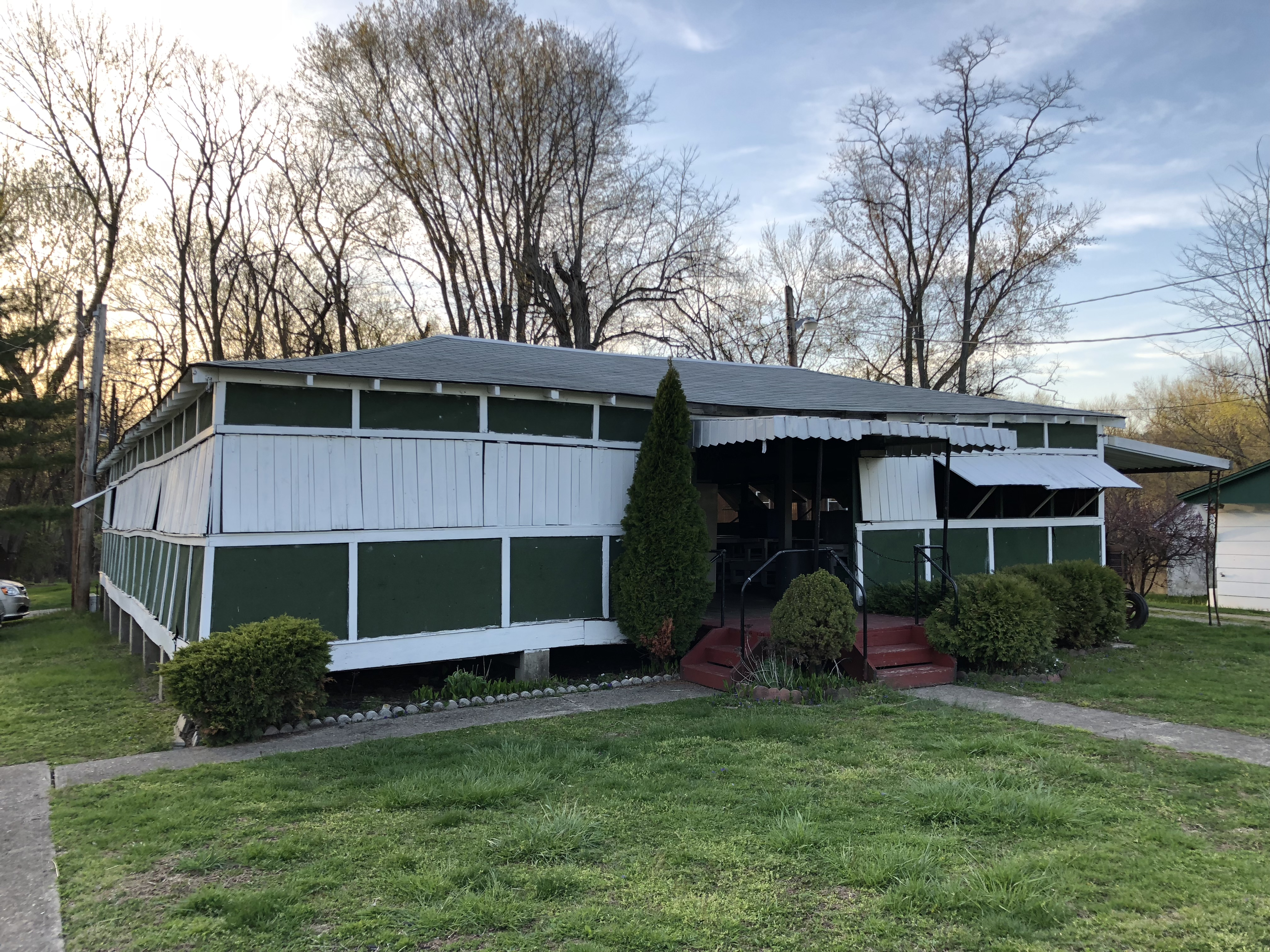
Dance Pavilion, built in 1921

The Kentucky Historic Preservation Review Board under the Kentucky Heritage Council advanced the nomination of the Doyle Country Club to the National Register of Historic Places in 2016, and Doyle's was added to the National Register of Historic Places in March 2017.
