= Walter House (Melbourne, Kentucky) =

Historic house in Kentucky, United States

- U.S. National Register of Historic Places
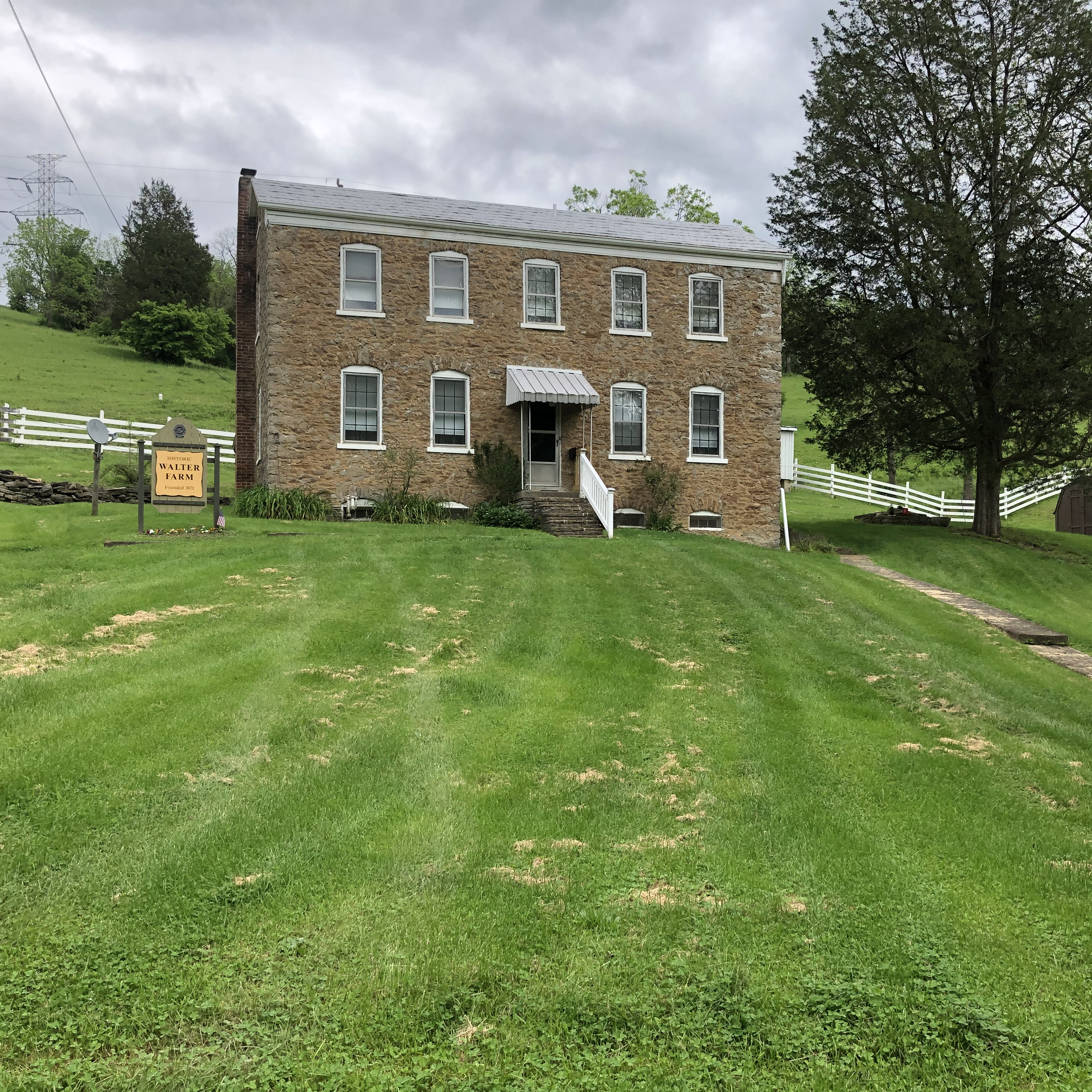

- Location within Kentucky Location within the United States
- Nearest city: Melbourne, Kentucky
- Coordinates: 38°59′51″N 84°19′35″W
- Area: 1.4 acres (0.57 ha)
- Built: 1869
- Built by: Walter, Charles
- Architectural style: I-house
- MPS: German Settlement, Four Mile Creek Area TR
- NRHP reference No.: 83004584
- Added to NRHP: December 11, 2007

The Walter House near Melbourne, Kentucky was built in c. 1869.

The house has a five bay I-house plan.

In March 1983 it was determined eligible for National Register listing but was not listed due to owner objection.

It was listed on the National Register of Historic Places in 2007.
