= Salem Methodist Episcopal Church and Parsonage (Newport, Kentucky) =

Historic church in Kentucky, United States

- U.S. National Register of Historic Places
- U.S. Historic district – Contributing property
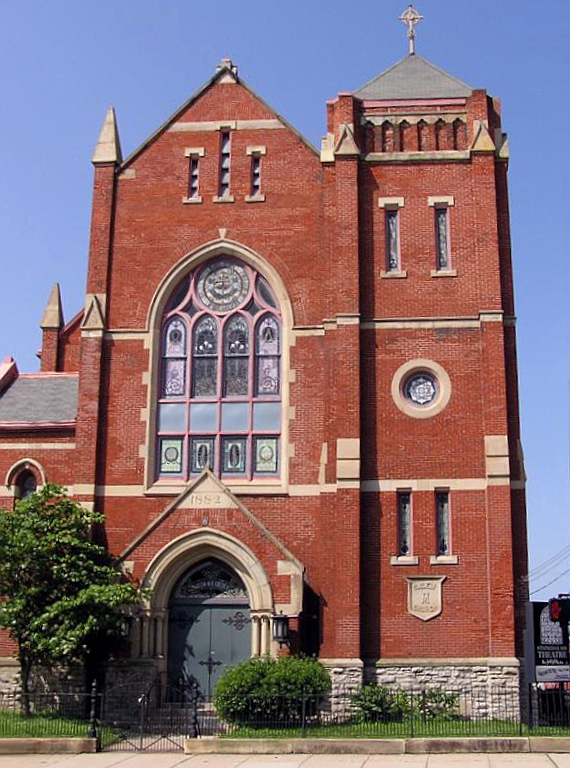

- Location within Kentucky Location within the United States
- Location: 810 York St., Newport, Kentucky
- Coordinates: 39°5′18″N 84°29′35″W
- Area: less than one acre
- Built: 1882
- Architect: Samuel Hannaford
- Architectural style: Gothic, Queen Anne
- Part of: York Street Historic District (ID95000640)
- NRHP reference No.: 86000608

Significant dates
- Added to NRHP: March 27, 1986
- Designated CP: May 26, 1995

Salem Methodist Episcopal Church and Parsonage (also known as Salem United Methodist Church; Salem Methodist Church) is a historic church and parsonage at 810 York Street in Newport, Kentucky.

The church was founded by the German-born pastor John George Schaal (1844–1949).

It was built in 1882. In 1986, the church lost its steeple to a tornado, and the congregation then merged with Grace Methodist Episcopal Church, also in Newport. The building was sold to a performing arts organization, and currently is the venue of Stained Glass Theatre.

The church was added to the National Register of Historic Places in 1986. The structure is a contributing property to the York Street Historic District.
