= Walter–Gimble House =

Historic house in Iowa, United States

- U.S. National Register of Historic Places
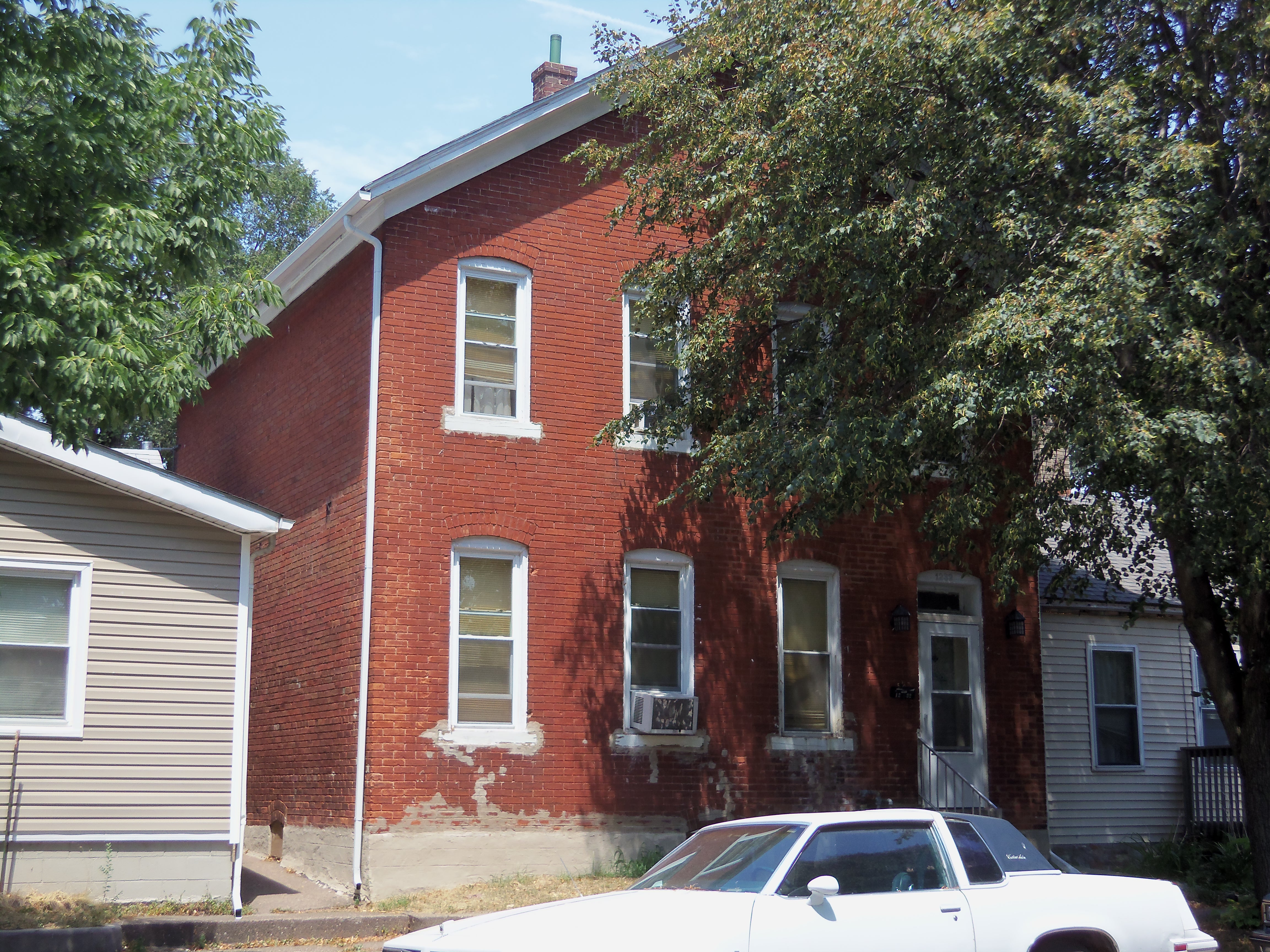

- Location within Iowa Location within the United States
- Location: 1232 W. 6th St. Davenport, Iowa
- Coordinates: 41°31′33″N 90°35′31″W
- Area: less than one acre
- Built: 1875
- MPS: Davenport MRA
- NRHP reference No.: 83002522
- Added to NRHP: July 7, 1983

The Walter–Gimble House is a historic building located in the west end of Davenport, Iowa, United States. It has been listed on the National Register of Historic Places since 1983.

== History ==
Bernhart and Agnes Walter lived here beginning in 1890 and lived here for a few years. He worked as a brewer at the Kohler & Lange Brewery. J.J. Gimble, who was a blacksmith, and his wife Mary lived here after the Walters. The city directories do not list who the previous occupants of the house were.

== Architecture ==
The house appears to be an expansion of the three-bay McClellan style, which was popular in Davenport after the Civil War. The four-bay house follows a rectangular plan. There is an entrance on the second floor, which suggests the house may have been a duplex from its early years.
