= St. Joseph Catholic Church (Camp Springs, Kentucky) =

Historic site in Campbell County, Kentucky, US

- St. Joseph's Catholic Church and Cemetery
- U.S. National Register of Historic Places
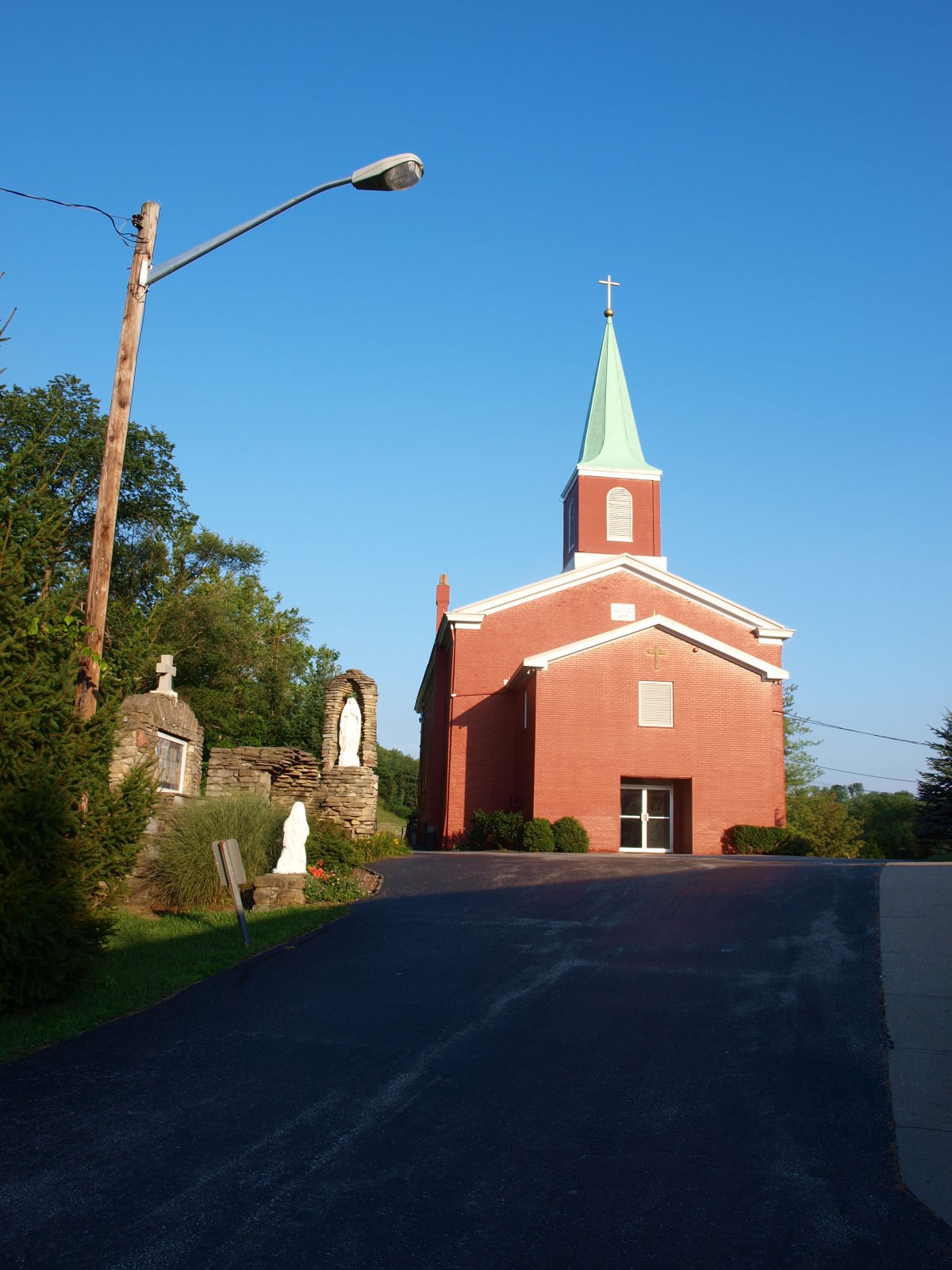

- Location within Kentucky Location within the United States
- Nearest city: 6833 Four Mile Road, Camp Springs, Kentucky, closer to Alexandria, Kentucky
- Coordinates: 38°59′38″N 84°21′42″W
- Area: 4.5 acres (1.8 ha)
- Built: 1864
- MPS: German Settlement, Four Mile Creek Area TR
- NRHP reference No.: 83002618
- Added to NRHP: May 16, 1983

St. Joseph's Catholic Church, also known as St. Joseph, Camp Springs and St. Joseph in the Hills, is a rural Roman Catholic parish near Camp Springs in Campbell County, Kentucky. The historic parish church and cemetery are located at 6833 Four Mile Road. The parochial school was located on the adjacent plot at 6829 Four Mile Road. It remains an active parish in the Roman Catholic Diocese of Covington, and its cemetery is still open for the burial of parish members.

== History ==
Catholic priests had visited the area as early as 1844. Martin Spalding, Bishop of Louisville, himself came to Four Mile Creek in August 1853 and was instrumental in the founding of the parish. By 1858, there were 109 registered families, mostly German immigrants. In 1868, the parish school moved into its own stone building, though this was later replaced with a modern structure, and by 2015, the school had closed except for its preschool programs due to declining enrollment.

== Church ==
The church is situated on a promontory that overlooks the valley. Completed in 1865, it is a belfried brick structure with a low gabled roof. It is notable for the rich iconography of its interior decor, including altarpieces and murals, mostly installed under the pastorship of Fr. Woestehen, parish priest from 1909 to 1926. Stained glass windows were contributed by members of the church from 1910 to 1912, and plaster and molding work were also installed in 1912. In the 1920s, the church's murals were painted by Leon Lippert, a student of noted Covington artist Frank Duveneck. The statue of Our Lady of Sorrows was donated in 1926 by Emma Ritter, and marble work in the sanctuary was completed by Bert Moriconi and painted in the 1940s.

On May 16, 1983, the church and cemetery were added to the National Register of Historic Places.
