= St. Anne Convent =

Roman Catholic monastery in Melbourne, Kentucky

Coordinates: 39.0297°N 84.3796°W

St. Anne Convent, located in Melbourne, Kentucky, is the home of the American Province of the Congregation of Divine Providence, a community of Roman Catholic Sisters. The convent houses the provincial offices of the congregation, the residences of two local communities, as well as Moye Spiritual Life Center. There are 140 members of the American Province of Sisters of Divine Providence, but the congregation also has provinces in France (the country located primarily in Western Europe) and Madagascar (the island country lying off the southeastern coast of Africa).

== History ==
The convent was constructed in 1919 to replace the former Provincial House at Our Lady of Providence Academy in Newport, Kentucky, and Mt. St. Martin's, also in Newport.

In the 1988 American road comedy-drama film directed by Barry Levinson and written by Barry Morrow and Ronald Bass, Rain Man, which outdid Who Framed Roger Rabbit in the highest worldwide grossing films of that year, St. Anne Convent served as the backdrop of the fictitious Wallbrook mental institution. Actors Tom Cruise and Dustin Hoffman appear in several scenes in front of the convent, and are also seen traveling down the convent's long oak-lined entrance.

On December 1, 2007, the convent announced that some of the trees would be cut down because of poor health, falling limbs, and the convent's inability to afford the annual maintenance. It was rumored that a private donor from Ft. Thomas, Kentucky, offered to pay the annual cost, and, so to prevent the trees from being needed to cut down. Nevertheless, all of the trees were ultimately cut down. However, new trees were planted beside the old ones in 2008, and the hope is that, one day, that each tree will stand as tall as each one of the old trees did.

On August 23, 2012, it was announced that the convent, attached retreat center, and grounds would be purchased from the Sisters of Divine Providence in early 2013, by the Diocese of Covington. Bishop Roger Foys included in the announcement that the move would "enable the diocese to upgrade and expand our retreat programs." The Sisters, however, will continue to own the Holy Family Infirmary, cemetery, and some other surrounding grounds and structures.

The convent is the former owner of the St. Anne Wetlands, a seasonal wetland conservation area, also located in Melbourne, in the United States. In September 2013, the land was purchased by the Campbell County Conservation District, through funds from the Kentucky Heritage Land Conservation Fund.

The body of Roman Catholic bishop Ferdinand Brossart, of the Diocese of Covington, Kentucky, was put into, and rests inside, since, the convent's cemetery, after he died.

St. Anne Retreat Center, today, is often used as a place for the high school and college students of Ohio, Kentucky, and the surrounding areas, to hold Emmaus, Kairos, and other Christian retreats. St. Anne Convent is known as a place of prayer, peace, and hospitality.
