= Peter Barth Farm =

Historic house in Kentucky, United States

- U.S. National Register of Historic Places
- Location within Kentucky Location within the United States
- Location: Alexandria, Kentucky vicinity
- Coordinates: 39°00′13″N 84°22′44″W
- Area: 1.35 acres (0.55 ha)
- Built: early to mid-nineteenth century
- Architectural style: Vernacular
- MPS: German Settlement, Four Mile Creek Area TR
- NRHP reference No.: 83002594
- Added to NRHP: March 9, 1983

Peter Barth Farm, on Lower Tug Fork Rd. near Alexandria, Kentucky, is a historic farm established in the early to mid-nineteenth century. The farm complex includes a log home, stone smokehouse, and stone storage building. Also known as the Thomer Farm, It was listed on the National Register of Historic Places in 1983 as part of the German Settlement, Four Mile Creek Area TR.

== History ==
Peter Barth was originally from Wallertheim, Germany. In 1857, he purchased 77 acres of land in the Tug Fork area from Charles Zennick. Barth was the son of Jacob Barth, who settled in the Tug Fork area in 1842 as one of the first German settlers in the region. The Peter Barth Farm is part of a significant German settlement in southern Campbell County, Kentucky, in the Four Mile Creek Area.
