= Blau's Four Mile House =

Historic house in Kentucky, United States

- U.S. National Register of Historic Places
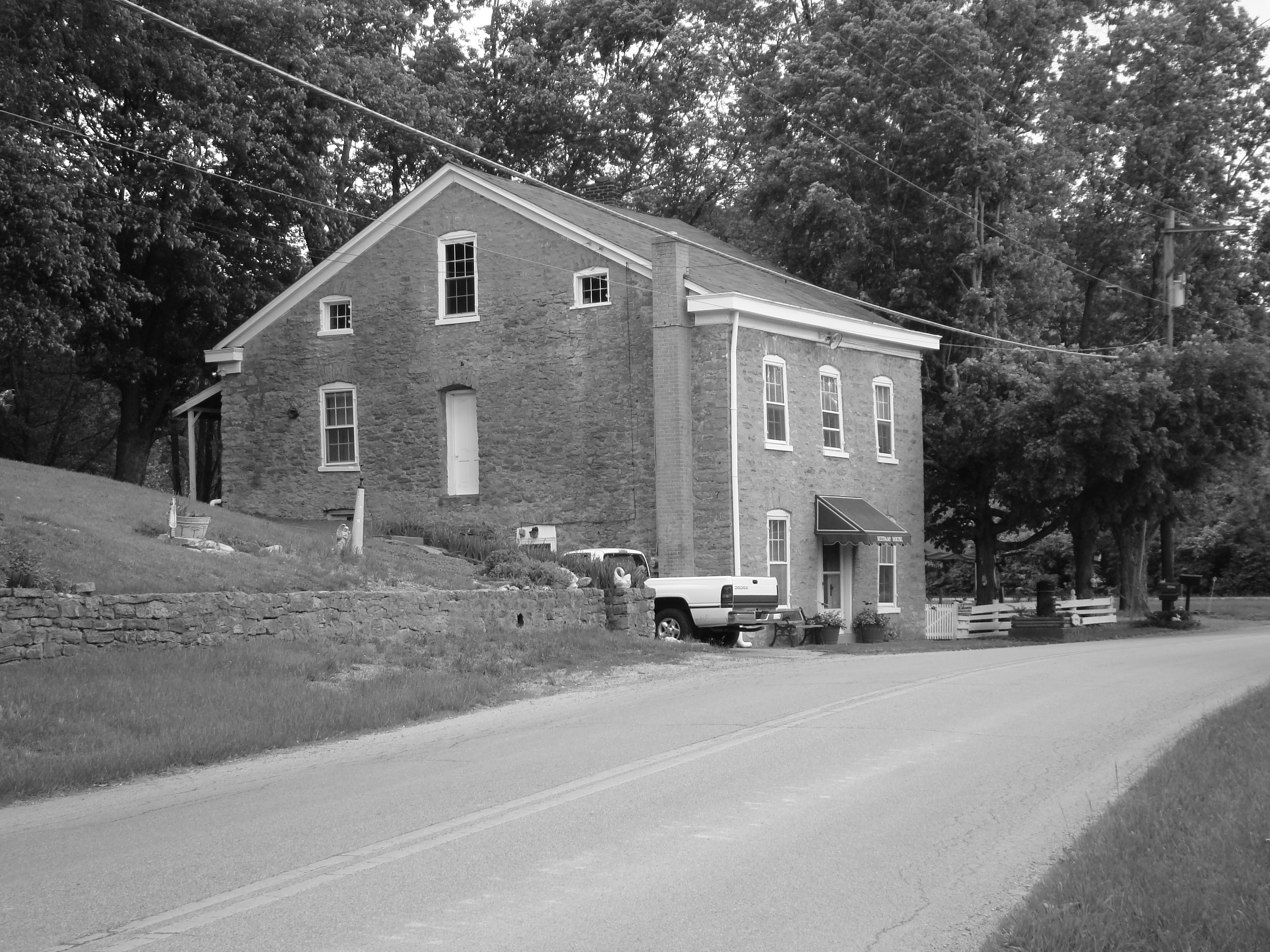
- Blau's Four Mile House (Reitman House), 2008.

- Location within Kentucky Location within the United States
- Location: Camp Springs, Kentucky
- Coordinates: 38°59′49″N 84°21′47″W
- Built: c.1850-1870
- Architect: Nicholas Reitman
- MPS: German Settlement, Four Mile Creek Area TR
- NRHP reference No.: 83002596
- Added to NRHP: March 9, 1983

Blau's Four Mile House, also known as the Reitman House, is a historic property located on Four Mile Road in Camp Springs, Kentucky, a rural area of Campbell County, Kentucky. The house was constructed by Nicholas Reitman as part of a settlement built by German immigrants in the mid-19th Century. The structure was added to the United States National Register of Historic Places in 1983.

It is a 2 1/2-story rubble limestone house built into a hillside.
