= Kort Grocery =

- U.S. National Register of Historic Places
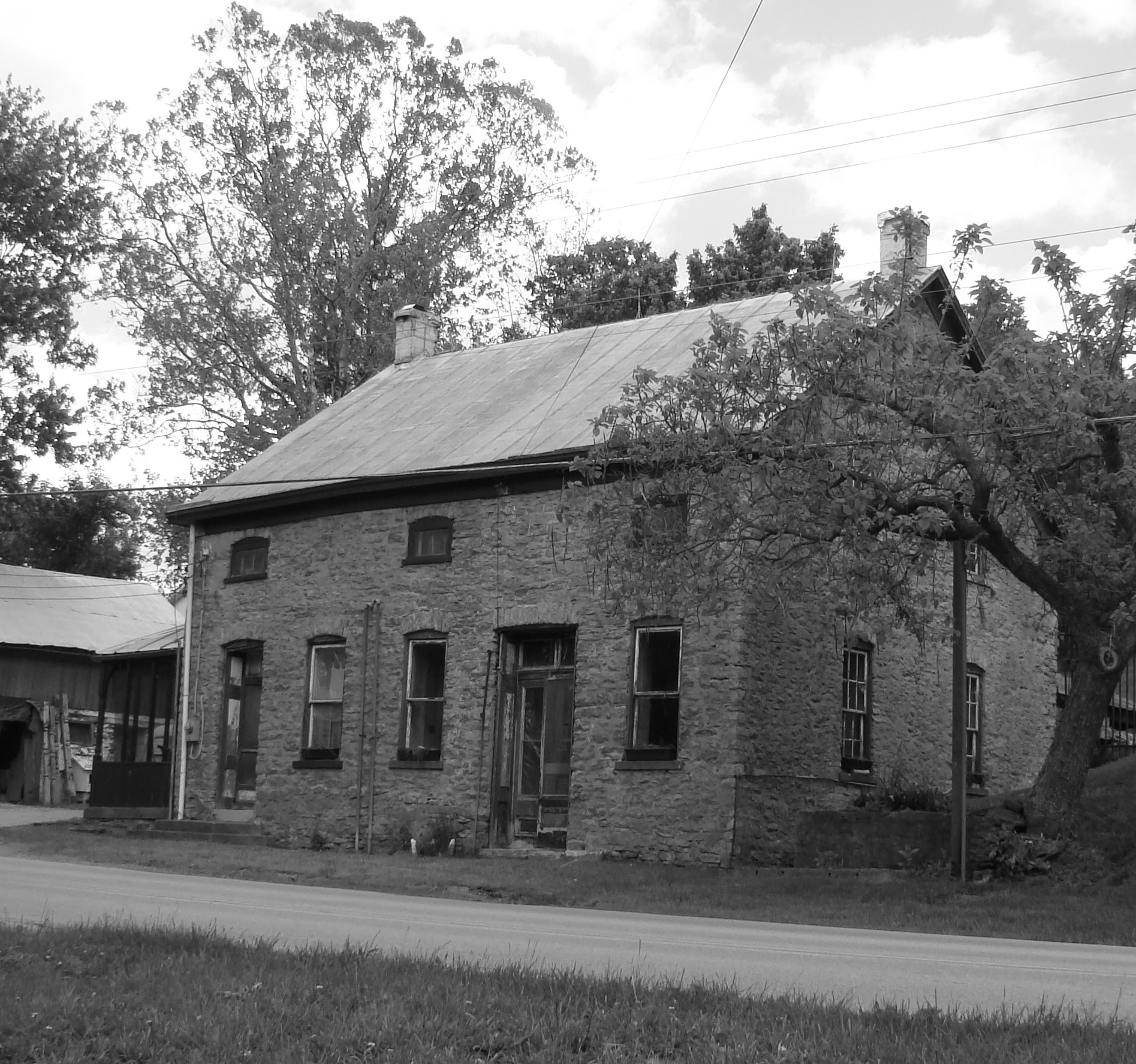
- Kort Grocery

- Location within Kentucky Location within the United States
- Location: Four Mile Pike, Camp Springs, Kentucky
- Coordinates: 39°0′1″N 84°21′49″W
- Built: 1880
- Built by: Peter Kort
- MPS: German Settlement, Four Mile Creek Area TR
- NRHP reference No.: 83002606
- Added to NRHP: March 9, 1983

Kort Grocery, also known as Camp Springs Grocery, is a historic property located on Four Mile Road in Camp Springs, Kentucky, a rural area of Campbell County, Kentucky. The stone building was constructed by Peter Kort in 1880 as part of a settlement built by German immigrants. The structure was added to the United States National Register of Historic Places in 1983.

It was built as a grocery store. It is a 1 1/2-story stone commercial store and residence built along a hillside. Its five-bay front faces Four Mile Pike.
