= Melbourne, Kentucky =

- City
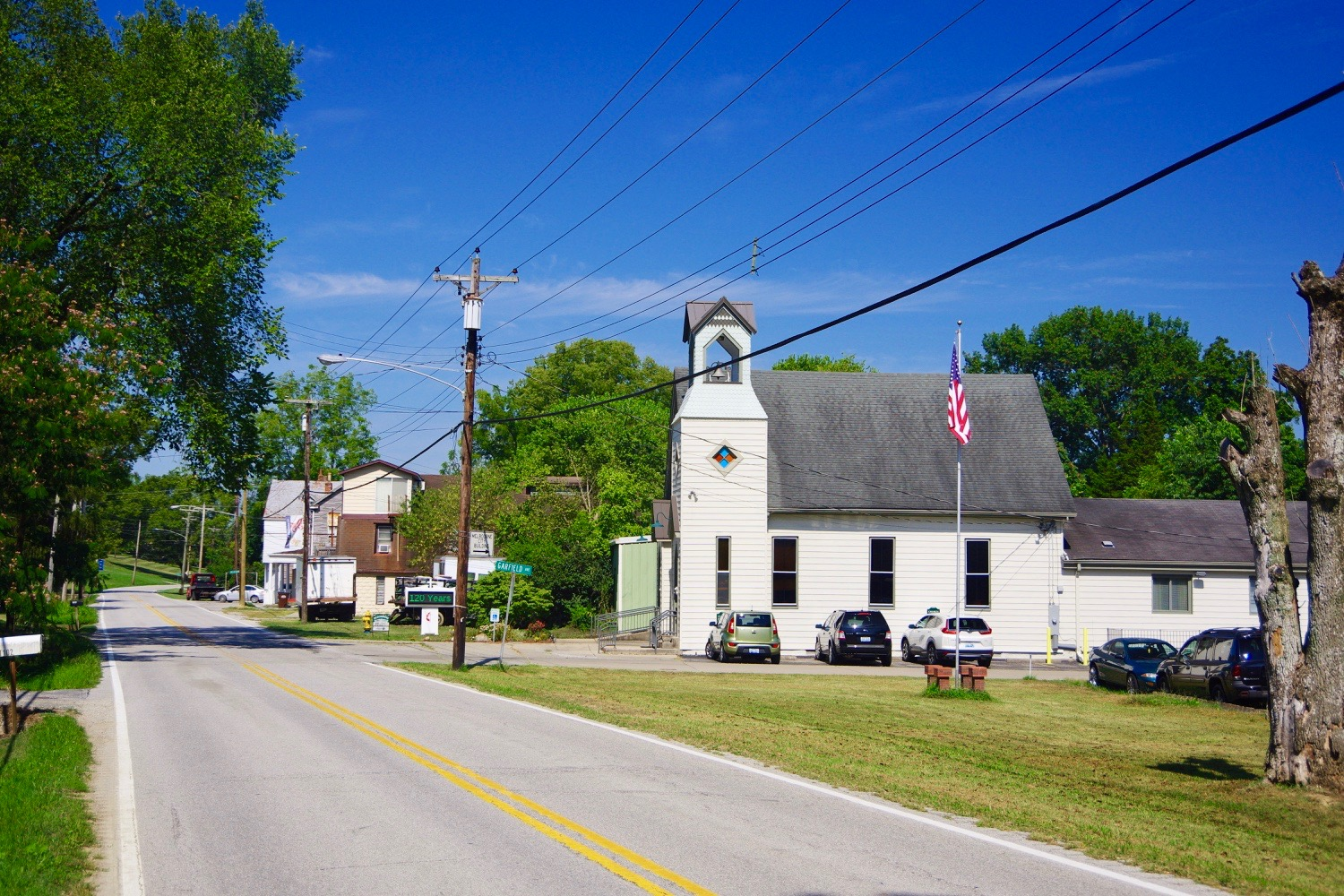
- Mary Ingles Highway (KY 8) in Melbourne

- Location of Melbourne in Campbell County, Kentucky.
- Coordinates: 39°01′54″N 84°22′15″W
- Country: United States
- State: Kentucky
- County: Campbell
- Incorporated: 1912

Area
  - Total: 0.83 sq mi (2.16 km^{2})
  - Land: 0.83 sq mi (2.16 km^{2})
  - Water: 0 sq mi (0.00 km^{2})
- Elevation: 492 ft (150 m)

Population (2020)
  - Total: 458
  - Density: 548.3/sq mi (211.71/km^{2})
- Time zone: UTC-5 (Eastern (EST))
  - Summer (DST): UTC-4 (EDT)
- ZIP code: 41059
- Area code: 859
- FIPS code: 21-51438
- GNIS feature ID: 2405066
- Website: https://www.cityofmelbourneky.com/

Melbourne is a home rule-class city in Campbell County, Kentucky, United States, along the south bank of the Ohio River. The population was 458 at the 2020 census. St. Anne Convent is located in Melbourne; scenes from the movie Rain Man were filmed there.

== Geography ==
Melbourne is located in northeastern Campbell County and is bordered by the city of Silver Grove to the west. To the north, across the Ohio River, is the unincorporated community of Coldstream, Ohio.

Kentucky Route 8 passes through Melbourne, following the Ohio River 9 miles (14 km) northwest (downstream) to Dayton and 31 miles (50 km) southeast to Augusta. Downtown Cincinnati, Ohio, is 11 miles (18 km) to the northwest via Interstate 471.

According to the United States Census Bureau, Melbourne has a total area of 0.78 square miles (2.01 km^{2}), all land.

== Demographics ==
Historical population
Census	Pop.	Note	%±
1970	275		—
1980	628		128.4%
1990	660		5.1%
2000	457		−30.8%
2010	401		−12.3%
2020	458		14.2%
U.S. Decennial Census

As of the census of 2000, there were 457 people, 150 households, and 115 families residing in the city. The population density was 507.9 inhabitants per square mile (196.1/km^{2}). There were 160 housing units at an average density of 177.8 per square mile (68.6/km^{2}). The racial makeup of the city was 99.78% White, and 0.22% from two or more races.

There were 150 households, out of which 27.3% had children under the age of 18 living with them, 60.7% were married couples living together, 12.7% had a female householder with no husband present, and 22.7% were non-families. 19.3% of all households were made up of individuals, and 10.7% had someone living alone who was 65 years of age or older. The average household size was 2.54 and the average family size was 2.91.

In the city the population was spread out, with 16.8% under the age of 18, 8.3% from 18 to 24, 23.0% from 25 to 44, 26.9% from 45 to 64, and 24.9% who were 65 years of age or older. The median age was 46 years. For every 100 females, there were 80.6 males. For every 100 females age 18 and over, there were 73.5 males.

The median income for a household in the city was $51,458, and the median income for a family was $56,250. Males had a median income of $40,833 versus $36,563 for females. The per capita income for the city was $23,324. About 3.5% of families and 15.5% of the population were below the poverty line, including 7.6% of those under age 18 and 38.1% of those age 65 or over.

== See also ==
- List of cities and towns along the Ohio River
- Other places named Melbourne
- St. Anne Woods and Wetlands, a conservation area in Melbourne
