= Camp Springs House =

Historic house in Kentucky, United States

- U.S. National Register of Historic Places
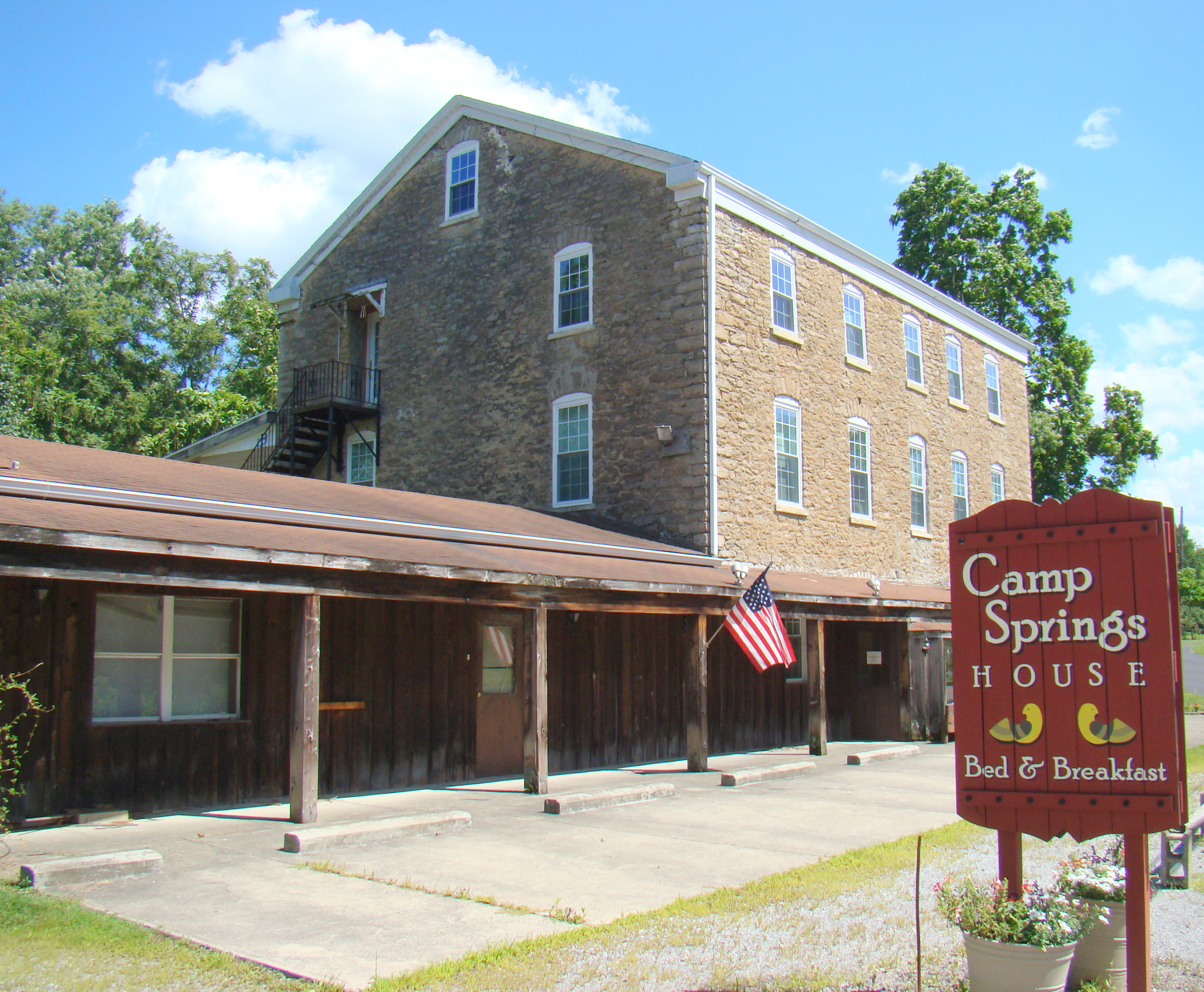
- Camp Springs House, 2008.

- Location within Kentucky Location within the United States
- Nearest city: Camp Springs, Kentucky
- Coordinates: 39°0′24″N 84°21′59″W
- MPS: German Settlement, Four Mile Creek Area TR
- NRHP reference No.: 83002599
- Added to NRHP: March 9, 1983

Camp Springs House, also known as Herb and Pat's Four Mile Inn and as Camp Springs Inn, is a historic property located on Four Mile Road in Camp Springs, Kentucky, a rural area of Campbell County, Kentucky. Originally built as a stage coach stop and inn, the stone building was constructed as part of a settlement built by German immigrants in the mid-19th century. The structure was added to the United States National Register of Historic Places in 1983.

It is an "imposing" three-and-a-half-story stone tavern and residence.

Camp Springs House was built in the 1860s for William Uthe by the Ort brothers. It is built of rubble limestone from the creek and surrounding land. It took about 4 years to build. It served as a stagecoach stop, tavern and inn. At one time it also served as a post office for the community. Over the years it has been a gathering place for the community. The 2nd floor once had a dance hall and card room. It was also popular for its beer garden and horseshoe tournaments. In the 1900s there was a ball field, restaurant/bar and pool hall.
