= Dayton, Kentucky =

- City
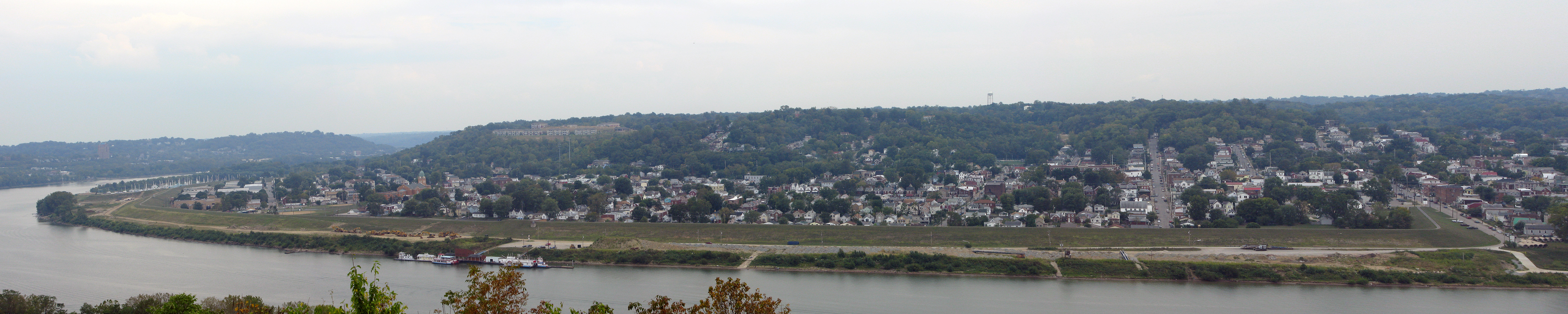

- Flag Seal
- Motto: "Quit your waitin', invest in Dayton!"
- Location of Dayton in Campbell County, Kentucky.
- Coordinates: 39°06′42″N 84°28′13″W
- Country: United States
- State: Kentucky
- County: Campbell

Government
  - Type: Mayor-Council
  - Mayor: Ben Baker

Area
  - Total: 1.93 sq mi (5.01 km^{2})
  - Land: 1.30 sq mi (3.36 km^{2})
  - Water: 0.63 sq mi (1.64 km^{2})
- Elevation: 591 ft (180 m)

Population (2020)
  - Total: 5,666
  - Estimate (2024): 5,854
  - Density: 4,362.1/sq mi (1,684.23/km^{2})
- Time zone: UTC-5 (Eastern (EST))
  - Summer (DST): UTC-4 (EDT)
- ZIP codes: 41073-41074
- Area code: 859
- FIPS code: 21-20350
- GNIS feature ID: 2404195
- Website: www.daytonky.com

The City of Dayton, Kentucky, is a home rule-class city along a bend of the Ohio River in Campbell County, Kentucky, United States. The population was 5,666 at the 2020 census. It is less than 3 miles (5 km) from downtown Cincinnati, Ohio.

== Geography ==
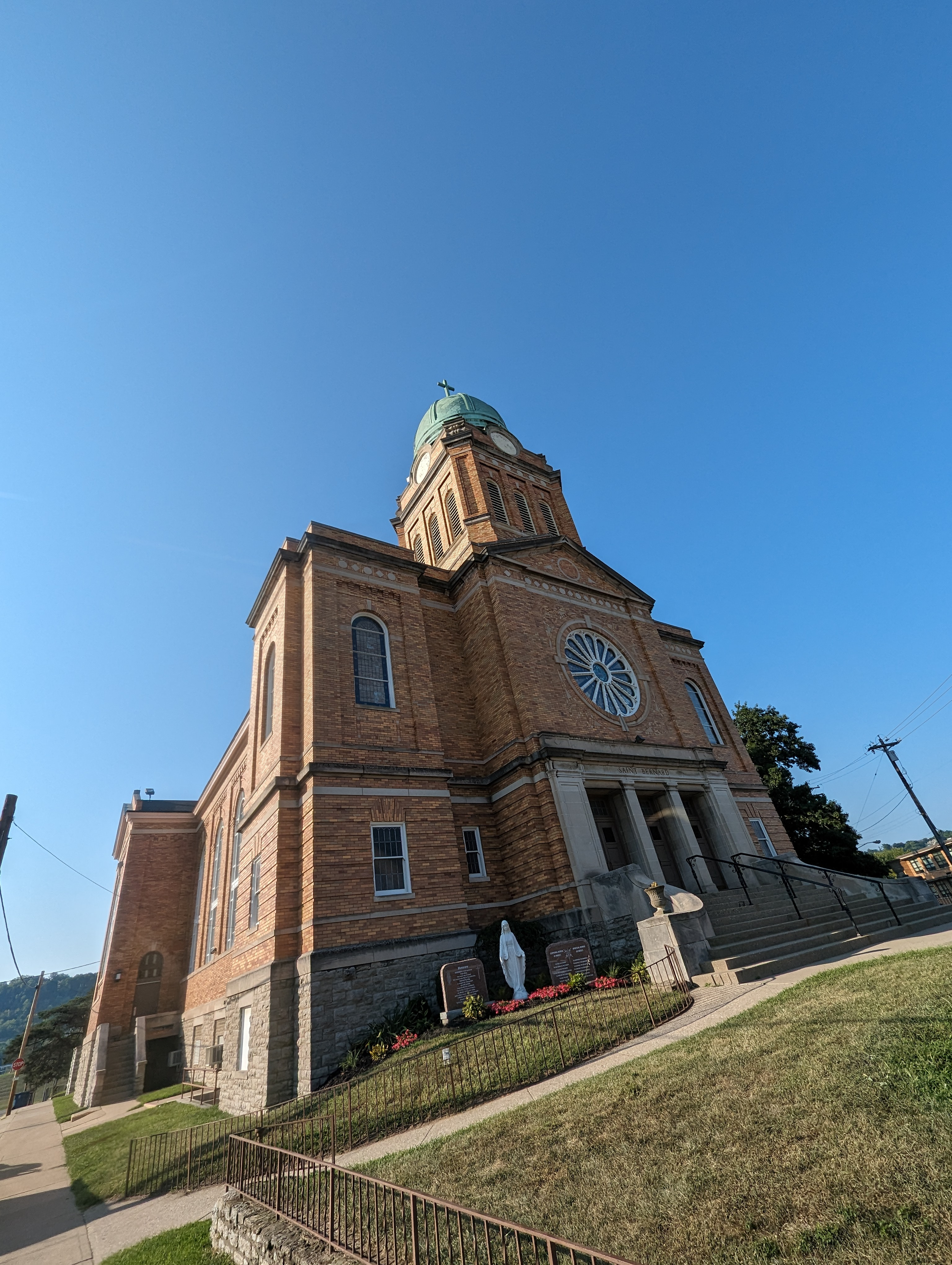
The Saint Bernard Church in Dayton, KY.

Dayton is located in the northernmost part of Campbell County on the inside of a bend in the Ohio River. It is the northernmost community in Kentucky as well. Dayton is bordered by Bellevue to the southwest and Fort Thomas to the southeast. To the north, across the Ohio River, is Cincinnati in Hamilton County, Ohio. The closest bridge across the Ohio is the Daniel Carter Beard Bridge on Interstate 471, connecting Newport with Cincinnati.

According to the United States Census Bureau, Dayton has a total area of 1.9 square miles (5.0 km^{2}), of which 1.3 square miles (3.3 km^{2}) is land and 0.66 square miles (1.7 km^{2}), or 33.61%, is water. Dayton is located within Kentucky's Outer Bluegrass region in the Upper South.

== Climate ==
The climate in this area is characterized by hot, humid summers and generally mild to cool winters. According to the Köppen Climate Classification system, Dayton has a humid subtropical climate, abbreviated "Cfa" on climate maps.

== History ==
Dayton had a ferry crossing, established in this area by the early 19th century, at the foot of what is now Dayton Pike.

Two separate cities, Jamestown and Brooklyn, separately incorporated in 1848 and 1849 respectively, were merged and reincorporated in 1867 under the name Dayton in honor of the Ohio town.

Jamestown was incorporated March 1, 1848. According to the state charter, the founding fathers were James Berry, James McArthur and Henry Walker. Berry was a nephew of James Taylor, Jr., founder of Newport, Kentucky.

Dayton has a large sandbar just offshore. It had a popular beach for many years known as the "Manhattan Bathing Beach", until the US Army Corps of Engineers raised the level of the Ohio River. In 1779, the beach was involved in the Battle of Dayton, KY; the fight involved Simon Girty, Alexander McKee, Col, John Campbell, Col. David Rogers and Capt. Robert Benham. Laws were passed prohibiting nude swimming in the Ohio River during daylight hours and prohibiting dogs from running loose. Violators of the nude swimming law faced a penalty of $1 for the first offense and as much as $5 for subsequent offenses. People also had the right to shoot dogs that were running loose in the city, and bill the owners for carcass removal. In 1919, the private Doyle Country Club was built and is now listed on the National Register of Historic Places.

Floods in 1884, 1913, and 1937 – the latter affecting 80 percent of the city and prompting residents to take shelter in the garages of the former Wadsworth Watch Case Co. – caused many of the companies in the once-booming town to move elsewhere. By the 1950s, many residents, weary of constant flooding, moved out of the town as well. A floodwall was finally completed in late 1981.

== Demographics ==
Historical population
Census	Pop.	Note	%±
1870	1,749		—
1880	3,210		83.5%
1890	4,264		32.8%
1900	6,104		43.2%
1910	6,979		14.3%
1920	7,646		9.6%
1930	9,071		18.6%
1940	8,379		−7.6%
1950	8,977		7.1%
1960	9,050		0.8%
1970	8,751		−3.3%
1980	6,979		−20.2%
1990	6,576		−5.8%
2000	5,966		−9.3%
2010	5,338		−10.5%
2020	5,666		6.1%
2024 (est.)	5,854		3.3%
U.S. Decennial Census

=== 2020 census ===
As of the 2020 census, Dayton had a population of 5,666. The median age was 38.1 years. 23.1% of residents were under the age of 18 and 14.2% of residents were 65 years of age or older. For every 100 females there were 98.7 males, and for every 100 females age 18 and over there were 95.7 males age 18 and over.

100.0% of residents lived in urban areas, while 0.0% lived in rural areas.

There were 2,240 households in Dayton, of which 28.6% had children under the age of 18 living in them. Of all households, 34.9% were married-couple households, 22.9% were households with a male householder and no spouse or partner present, and 31.7% were households with a female householder and no spouse or partner present. About 30.7% of all households were made up of individuals and 9.6% had someone living alone who was 65 years of age or older.

There were 2,558 housing units, of which 12.4% were vacant. The homeowner vacancy rate was 2.2% and the rental vacancy rate was 9.5%.

Racial composition as of the 2020 census
Race	Number	Percent
White	5,118	90.3%
Black or African American	101	1.8%
American Indian and Alaska Native	25	0.4%
Asian	28	0.5%
Native Hawaiian and Other Pacific Islander	1	0.0%
Some other race	87	1.5%
Two or more races	306	5.4%
Hispanic or Latino (of any race)	207	3.7%

=== 2000 census ===
As of the 2000 census, there were 5,966 people, 2,200 households, and 1,518 families residing in the city. The population density was 4,494.7 inhabitants per square mile (1,735.4/km^{2}). There were 2,401 housing units at an average density of 1,808.9 per square mile (698.4/km^{2}). The racial makeup of the city was 98.32% White, 0.45% African American, 0.18% Native American, 0.17% Asian, 0.02% Pacific Islander, 0.08% from other races, and 0.77% from two or more races. Hispanic or Latino of any race were 0.59% of the population.

There were 2,200 households, out of which 35.2% had children under the age of 18 living with them, 45.3% were married couples living together, 18.0% had a female householder with no husband present, and 31.0% were non-families. 25.5% of all households were made up of individuals, and 10.6% had someone living alone who was 65 years of age or older. The average household size was 2.69 and the average family size was 3.24.

In the city the population was spread out, with 28.2% under the age of 18, 11.9% from 18 to 24, 29.8% from 25 to 44, 19.5% from 45 to 64, and 10.6% who were 65 years of age or older. The median age was 32 years. For every 100 females, there were 96.1 males. For every 100 females age 18 and over, there were 92.0 males.

The median income for a household in the city was $32,008, and the median income for a family was $38,339. Males had a median income of $28,592 versus $21,048 for females. The per capita income for the city was $15,373. About 15.2% of families and 16.3% of the population were below the poverty line, including 24.4% of those under age 18 and 4.7% of those age 65 or over.

== Notable people ==
- Robert Agnew, actor who worked mostly in the silent film era
- Edward H. Ahrens, recipient of Navy Cross, died at Guadalcanal
- Todd Benzinger, former Major League Baseball player
- Lonnie Burr, actor, dancer/choreographer, singer, director and author
- Bob DeMoss, football player, coach, and college athletics administrator
- Earl Murray, football player
- Will Radcliff, businessman who created the Slush Puppie
- Jesse Tannehill, former MLB player
- Lee Tannehill, former MLB player
- John Wooden, Hall of Fame basketball coach, coached at Dayton High

== See also ==
- List of cities and towns along the Ohio River
