= Camp Springs, Kentucky =

Unincorporated community in Kentucky, United States

Coordinates: 39°00′07″N 84°21′53″W

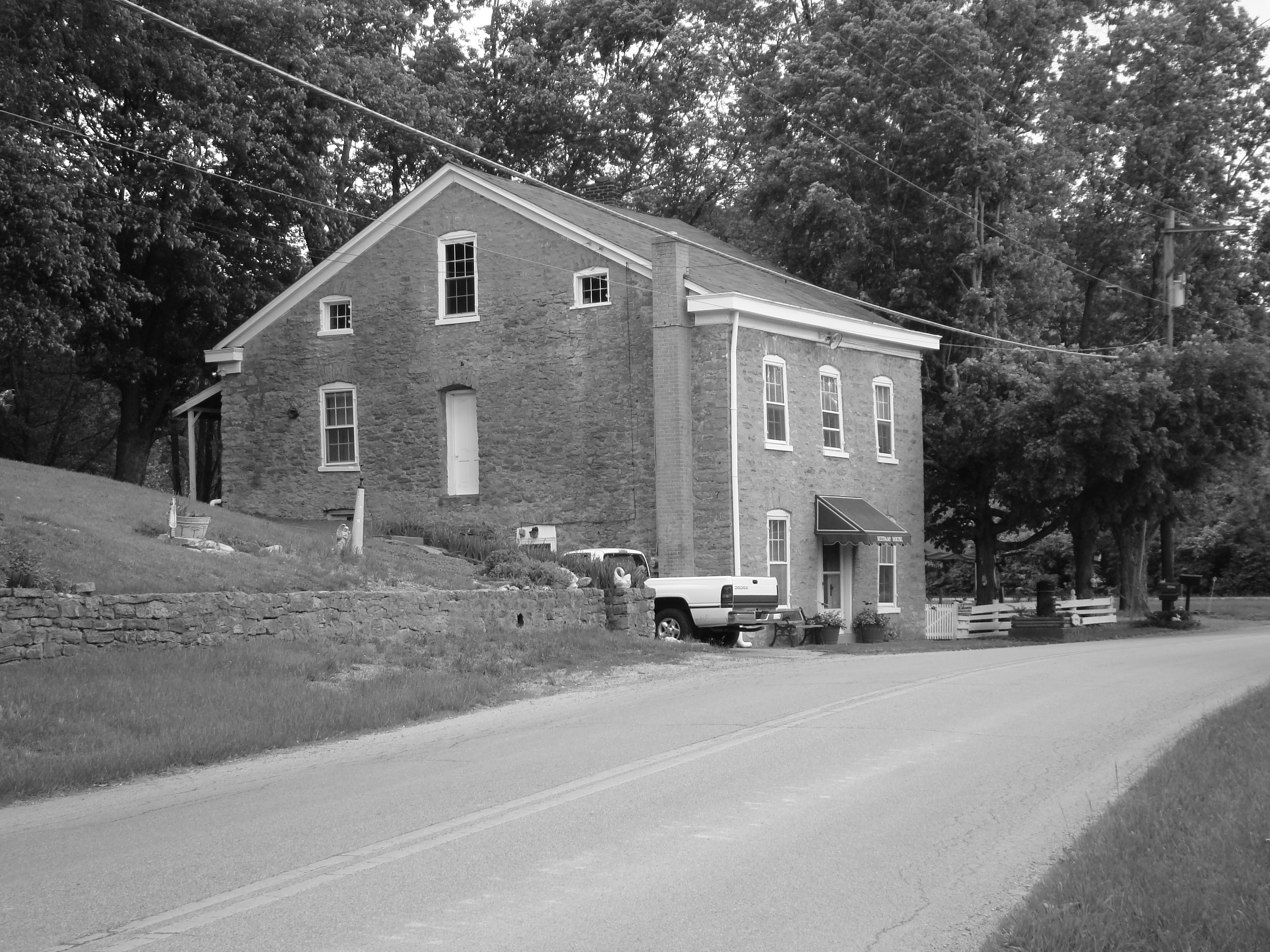
Blau's Four Mile House in Camp Springs.

Camp Springs is an unincorporated community in Campbell County, Kentucky, United States. It ten miles southeast of Cincinnati, Ohio. During the mid-19th century, the area was settled by German immigrants from the Rhine River wine districts.

== History ==
A small group of immigrants from southwest Germany settled in rural Campbell County and established farms and vineyards. The immigrants constructed numerous buildings with stone masonry, using unusual architectural features that give the area a unique style. Many of these local properties were added to the United States National Register of Historic Places in 1983.

== See also ==
- Camp Springs House
- Kort Grocery
- St. Joseph Catholic Church (Camp Springs, Kentucky)
