= List of tallest buildings in Ohio =

This List of tallest buildings in Ohio ranks the fifty tallest high-rise buildings by height within the state of Ohio. Ohio's twenty-five tallest buildings are all located in Ohio's three largest cities: Columbus (Central Ohio), Cleveland (Northeast Ohio), and Cincinnati (Southwest Ohio).

== List ==
Tallest building in Ohio upon completion

| Rank | Name | Image | Height ft (m) | Floors | Year | City | Notes |
|---|---|---|---|---|---|---|---|
| 1 | Key Tower | | 947 (289) | 57 | 1991 | Cleveland | The 165th-tallest building in the world and 40th-tallest in the United States. The tallest building in Cleveland. |
| 2 | Terminal Tower | | 708 (216) | 52 | 1927 | Cleveland | 102nd-tallest building in the United States. 2nd-tallest building in the world when completed. |
| 3 | Great American Tower at Queen City Square | | 665 (203) | 41 | 2010 | Cincinnati | Tallest building in Cincinnati. |
| 4 | 200 Public Square | | 658 (201) | 45 | 1985 | Cleveland | |
| 5 | Rhodes State Office Tower | | 629 (192) | 45 | 1973 | Columbus | Tallest building in Columbus. |
| 6 | Sherwin-Williams Headquarters | | 616 (187) | 36 | 2024 | Cleveland | |
| 7 | Carew Tower | | 574 (175) | 49 | 1931 | Cincinnati | |
| 8 | LeVeque Tower | | 555 (169) | 49 | 1927 | Columbus | 5th-tallest building in the world when completed. |
| 9 | William Green Building | | 530 (162) | 33 | 1990 | Columbus | |
| 10 | Tower at Erieview | | 529 (161) | 40 | 1964 | Cleveland | |
| 11 | Huntington Center | | 512 (156) | 37 | 1984 | Columbus | |
| 12 | Vern Riffe State Office Tower | | 503 (153) | 32 | 1988 | Columbus | |
| 13 | Fourth and Vine Tower | | 495 (151) | 31 | 1913 | Cincinnati | |
| 14 | One Nationwide Plaza | | 485 (148) | 40 | 1976 | Columbus | |
| 15 | Scripps Center | | 468 (143) | 36 | 1990 | Cincinnati | |
| 16 | Franklin County Government Center | | 464 (141) | 27 | 1991 | Columbus | |
| 17 | AEP Building | | 456 (139) | 31 | 1983 | Columbus | |
| 18 | One Cleveland Center | | 450 (137) | 31 | 1983 | Cleveland | |
| 19 | Fifth Third Center (Cleveland) | | 446 (136) | 27 | 1991 | Cleveland | |
| 20 | Borden Building | | 438 (134) | 34 | 1974 | Columbus | |
| 21 | Carl B. Stokes Federal Courthouse Tower | | 430 (131) | 23 | 2002 | Cleveland | |
| 22 | Fifth Third Center (Cincinnati) | | 423 (129) | 32 | 1969 | Cincinnati | |
| 23 | Justice Center Complex | | 420 (128) | 26 | 1977 | Cleveland | |
| 24 | Anthony J. Celebrezze Federal Building | | 419 (128) | 31 | 1967 | Cleveland | |
| 25 | Center at 600 Vine | | 418 (127) | 30 | 1984 | Cincinnati | |
| 26 | Fifth Third Center at One SeaGate | | 411 (125) | 32 | 1982 | Toledo | Tallest building in Toledo. Tallest building in Ohio outside Cleveland, Columbus, and Cincinnati. |
| 27 | First Financial Center | | 410 (125) | 32 | 1991 | Cincinnati | |
| 27 | PNC Center (Cleveland) | | 410 (125) | 35 | 1980 | Cleveland | |
| 29 | Three Nationwide Plaza | | 408 (124) | 27 | 1989 | Columbus | |
| 30 | Stratacache Tower | | 405 (124) | 30 | 1970 | Dayton | Tallest building in Dayton. Also known as Kettering Tower. |
| 31 | Fiberglas Tower | | 400 (120) | 30 | 1969 | Toledo | |
| 32 | The Lumen | | 396 (121) | 35 | 2020 | Cleveland | |
| 33 | KeyBank Tower | | 385 (117) | 28 | 1976 | Dayton | |
| 34 | The 9 | | 383 (117) | 28 | 1971 | Cleveland | |
| 35 | Hilton Cleveland Downtown Hotel | | 374 (114) | 32 | 2016 | Cleveland | |
| 36 | Hilton Cincinnati Netherland Plaza | | 372 (113) | 31 | 1931 | Cincinnati | |
| 37 | PNC Bank Building | | 368 (112) | 27 | 1930 | Toledo | |
| 37 | Columbia Plaza | | 368 (112) | 29 | 1984 | Cincinnati | |
| 39 | One Columbus Center | | 366 (112) | 26 | 1987 | Columbus | |
| 40 | AT&T Huron Road Building | | 365 (111) | 24 | 1927 | Cleveland | |
| 41 | Rhodes Tower | | 363 (110) | 20 | 1971 | Cleveland | |
| 42 | Hilton Columbus Downtown Tower | | 361 (110) | 28 | 2023 | Columbus | |
| 43 | Chase Tower | | 357 (109) | 25 | 1964 | Columbus | |
| 44 | Eaton Center | | 356 (109) | 28 | 1983 | Cleveland | |
| 45 | The Beacon | | 355 (108) | 28 | 2019 | Cleveland | |
| 46 | PNC Center (Cincinnati) | | 354 (108) | 27 | 1979 | Cincinnati | |
| 47 | Atrium Two | | 351 (107) | 28 | 1984 | Cincinnati | |
| 47 | US Bank Tower (Cincinnati) | | 351 (107) | 26 | 1981 | Cincinnati | |
| 49 | Capitol Square | | 350 (107) | 26 | 1984 | Columbus | |
| 50 | Continental Center | | 348 (106) | 26 | 1973 | Columbus | |

== Tallest buildings under construction or proposed ==
| Name | Height | City | Completion year |
|---|---|---|---|
| Merchant Building | 382 ft (116 m) | Columbus | 2025 |
| Wexner Medical Center Inpatient Hospital | 410 ft (120 m) | Columbus | 2026 |
| Cleveland Clinic Neurological Institute Building | 243 ft (74 m) | Cleveland | 2026 |
| Scioto Peninsula Phase 2 | TBA (24 stories) | Columbus | 2027 |
| The Estrella | TBA (19 stories) | Columbus | TBA |

== Timeline of tallest buildings ==
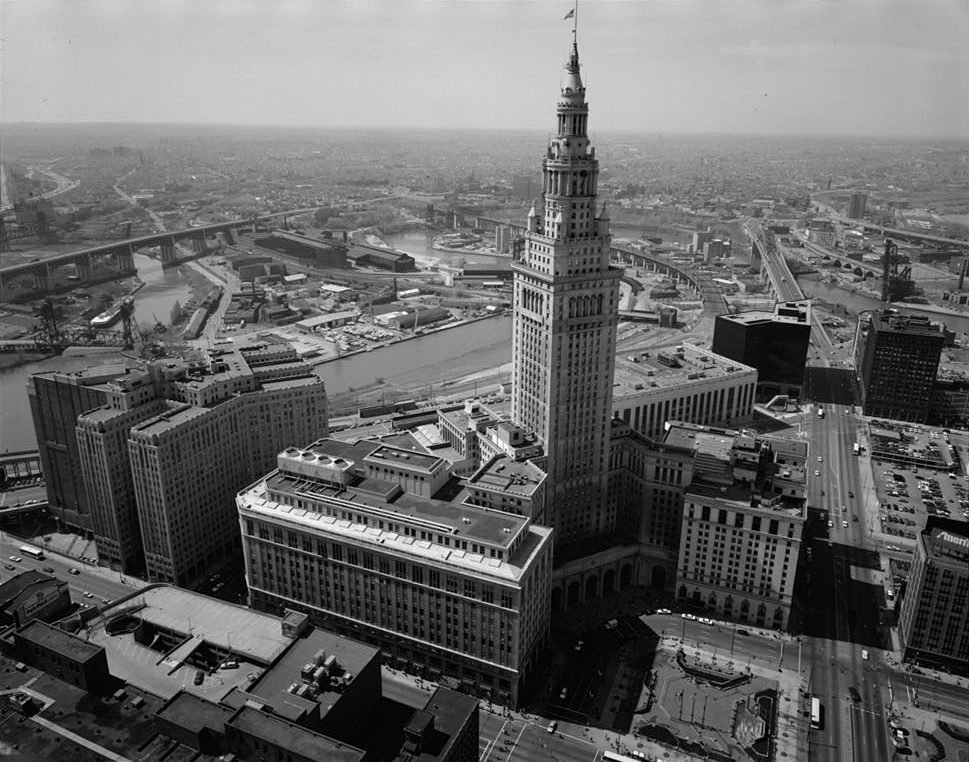
The Terminal Tower stood as the tallest building in Ohio for 61 years, from 1930 until 1991.

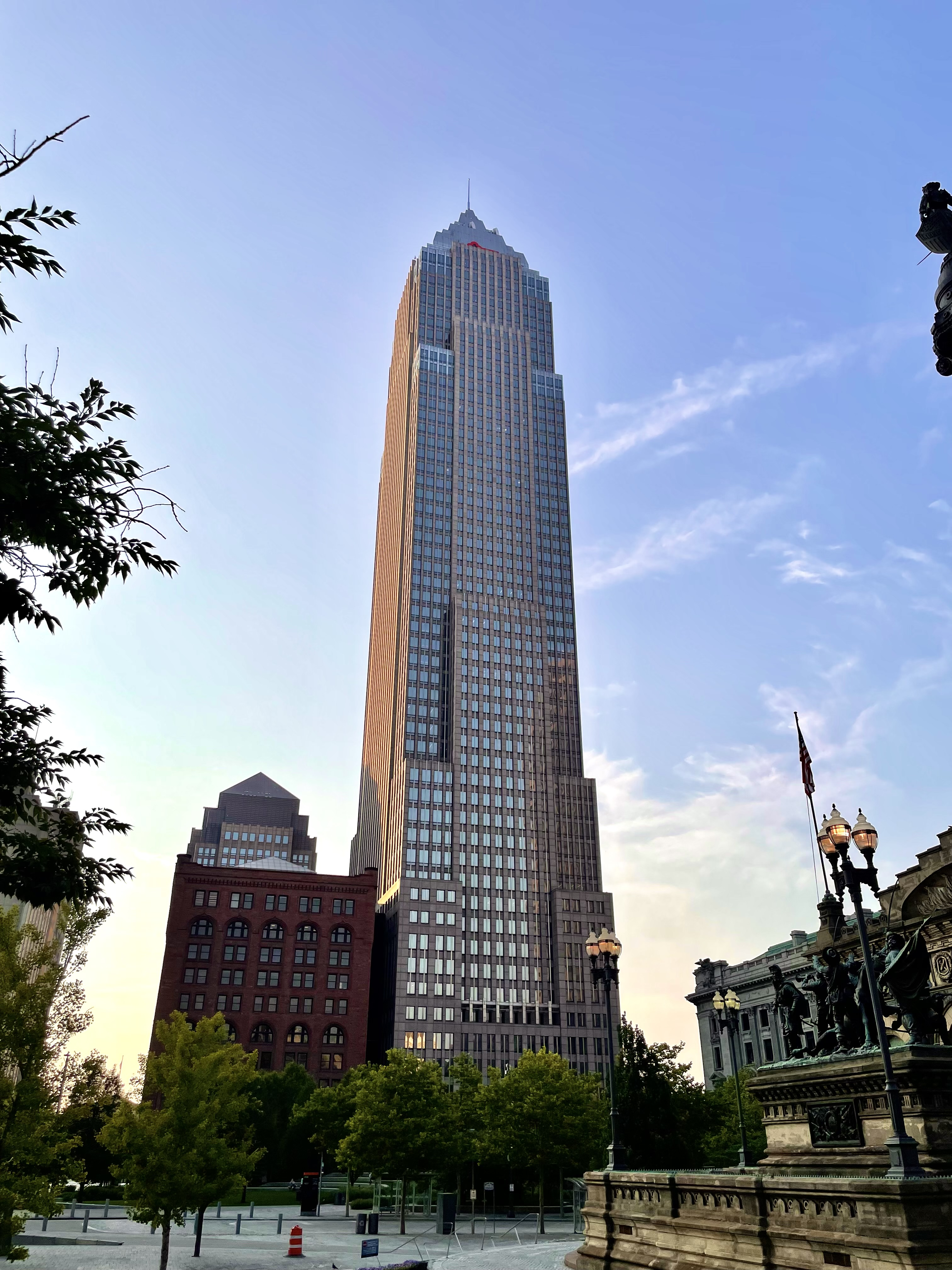
Ohio's first skyscraper, the Society for Savings Building (left), stands adjacent to Key Tower (right), the tallest building in Ohio.

This lists buildings that once held the title of tallest building in Ohio.

| Name | Image | City | Years as tallest | Height ft (m) | Floors | Reference |
|---|---|---|---|---|---|---|
| Society for Savings Building | | Cleveland | 1889–1896 | 152 (46) | 10 | |
| New England Building (Note: The New England Building has since been renamed the Guardian Bank Building.) | | Cleveland | 1896–1901 | 221 (67) | 15 | |
| Union Trust Building (Note: The Union Trust Building has since been renamed the Renaissance Cincinnati Downtown Hotel.) | | Cincinnati | 1901–1904 | 239 (77) | 19 | |
| Clopay Building (Note: The Clopay Building has since been renamed the Fourth & Walnut Center.) | | Cincinnati | 1904–1913 | 240 (73) | 19 | |
| Union Central Tower (Note: The Union Central Tower has since been renamed the Fourth & Vine Tower.) | | Cincinnati | 1913–1927 | 495 (151) | 31 | |
| American Insurance Union Citadel (Note: The American Insurance Union Citadel has since been renamed the LeVeque Tower.) | | Columbus | 1927–1930 | 555 (169) | 47 | |
| Terminal Tower | | Cleveland | 1930–1991 | 771 (235) | 52 | |
| Society Center (Note: Society Center has since been renamed Key Tower.) | | Cleveland | 1991–present | 947 (289) | 57 | |

== See also ==
- List of tallest buildings in Akron
- List of tallest buildings in Cincinnati
- List of tallest buildings in Cleveland
- List of tallest buildings in Columbus
- List of tallest buildings in Dayton
- List of tallest buildings in Toledo

== Sources ==
- Hunter, Bob (2012). A Historical Guidebook to Old Columbus: Finding the Past in the Present in Ohio's Capital City. Athens, Ohio: Ohio University Press. ISBN 978-0821420126. OCLC 886535510.
- Korom, Joseph Jr. (2008), The American Skyscraper, 1850-1940: A Celebration of Height, Boston, Massachusetts: Branden Books, ISBN 978-0828321884
