= List of tallest buildings in Cincinnati =

Skyline of Cincinnati
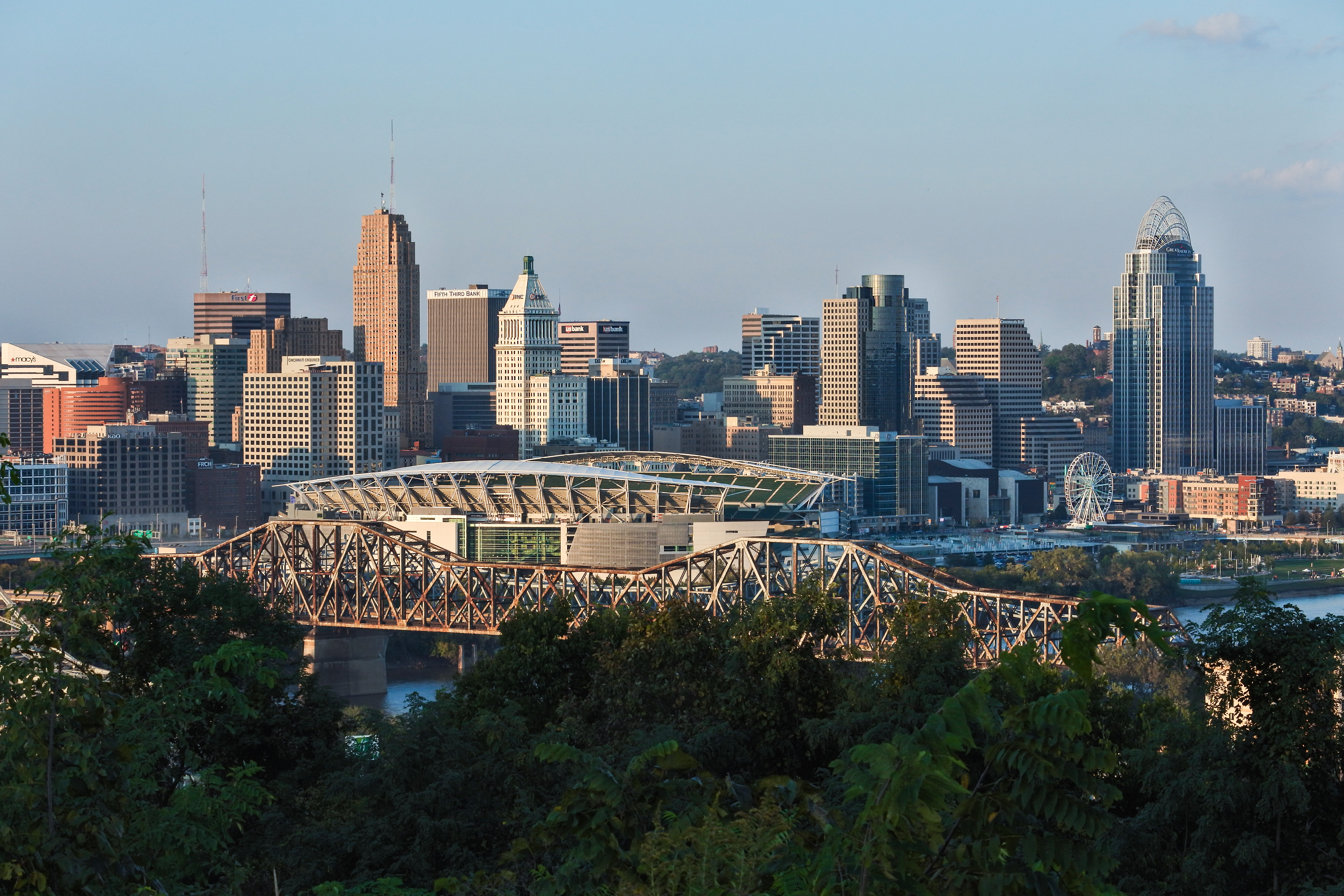
- Downtown Cincinnati from Devou Park in 2019
- Tallest building: Great American Tower at Queen City Square (2011)
- Tallest building height: 665 ft (202.7 m)
- First 150 m+ building: Fourth and Vine Tower (1913)

Number of tall buildings (2026)
- Taller than 100 m (328 ft): 12
- Taller than 150 m (492 ft): 3
- Taller than 200 m (656 ft): 1

Number of tall buildings — feet
- Taller than 200 ft (61.0 m): 42
- Taller than 300 ft (91.4 m): 17

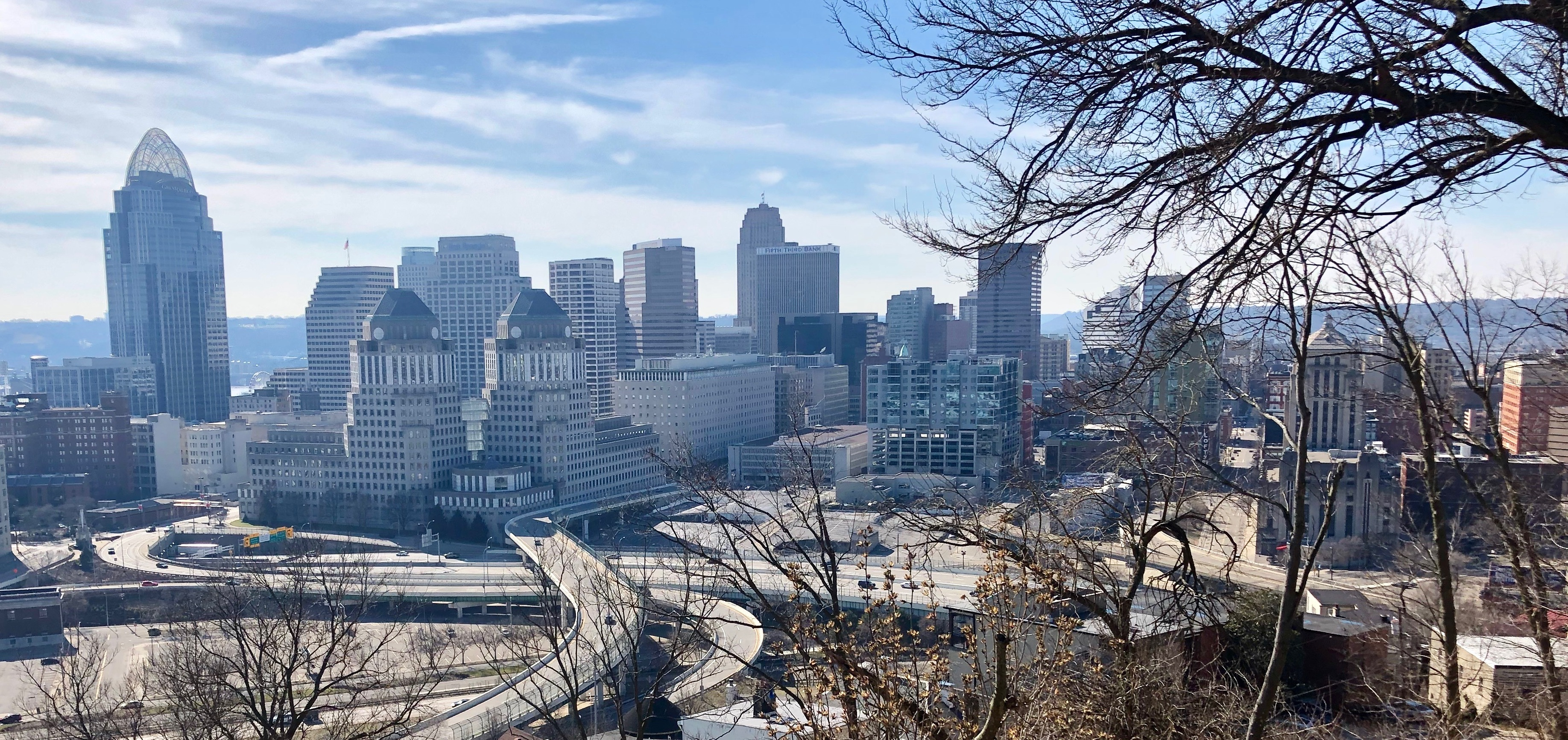
Downtown Cincinnati from Mount Adams, 2019

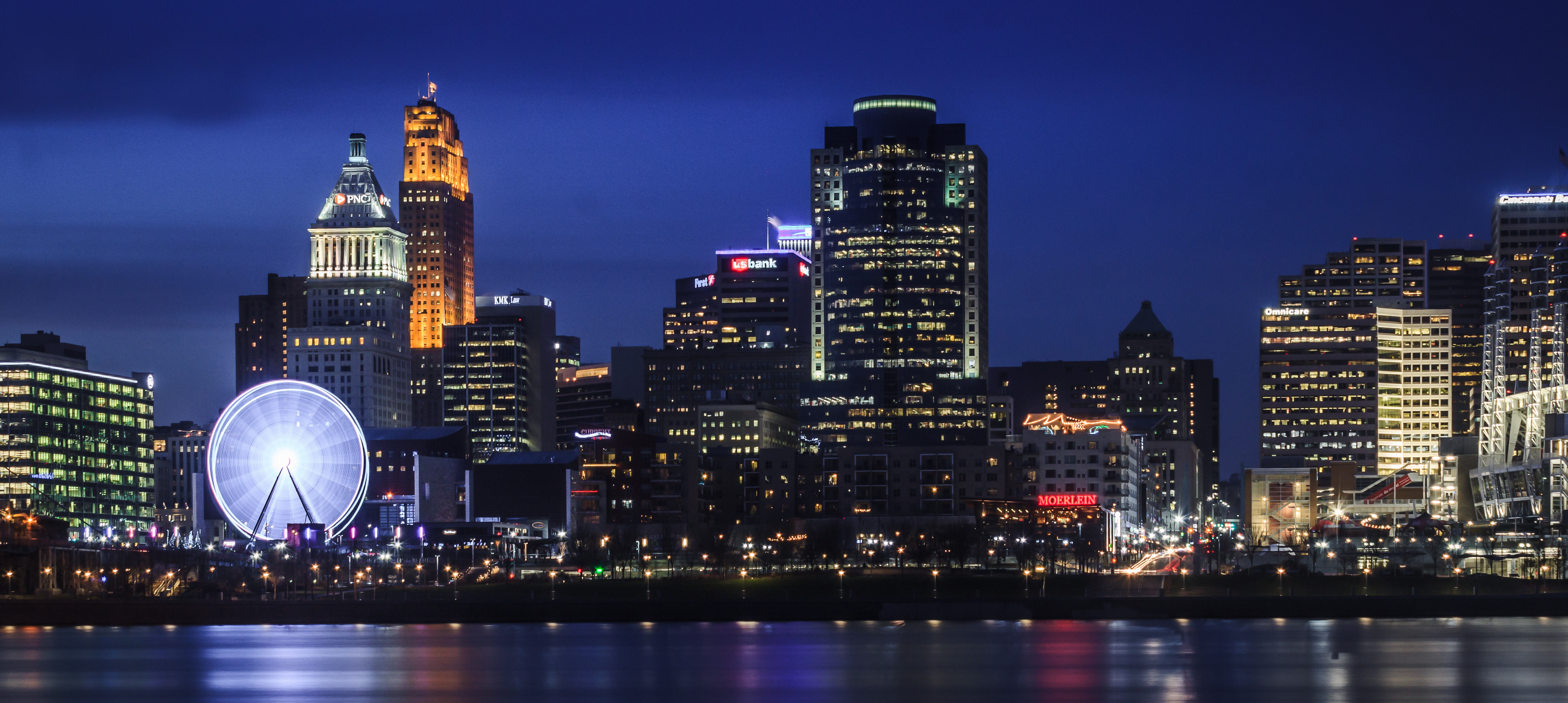
Cincinnati skyline at night, along the Ohio River

Cincinnati is the third largest city in the U.S. state of Ohio, with a metropolitan area population of 2.3 million. The economic hub of southwestern Ohio, Cincinnati is home to over 120 high-rises, 41 of which have a height greater than 200 feet (61 m) as of 2026. It has the third highest number of skyscrapers taller than 300 feet (91 m) of any city in Ohio, after Cleveland and Columbus, with 17 such buildings. The tallest building in Cincinnati is the Great American Tower at Queen City Square, a 665 ft (203 m), 40-story office building that was completed in 2011. It is the third-tallest building in Ohio, and the tallest completed in the state during the 21st century.

One of the largest cities in the United States at the turn of the 20th century, Cincinnati was the site of first skyscraper taller than 492 ft (150 m) outside of New York City. Completed in 1913, the Hellenic-inspired Fourth and Vine Tower was the fifth-tallest building in the world at the time at 495 ft (151 m). It was the tallest outside of New York City and Philadelphia. An early construction boom occurred during the late 1920s, which culminated with an even taller skyscraper on Vine Street, the 574 ft (175 m) Carew Tower, in 1930. Part of a three-tower mixed-use Art Deco complex, the Carew Tower made Cincinnati the fourth city in the world more than one building taller than 492 ft (150 m), after New York City, Chicago, and Detroit.

Another boom took place from the 1950s until the 1990s, especially from the mid-1970s onwards. Several buildings from this era serve as notable corporate headquarters, such as the Kroger Building for the epnoymous retail company, Fifth Third Center for Fifth Third Bank, and the Scripps Center for the E. W. Scripps Company. Procter & Gamble's headquarters include twin postmodern towers. Columbia Plaza and Macy's Building were former headquarters of Chiquita and Macy's, Inc., respectively. Since the 1990s, few tall buildings have been constructed in Cincinnati, with the notable exception of the Great American Tower at Queen City Square in 2011. The building's tiara-shaped top ended the Carew Tower's 80-year long reign as Cincinnati's tallest building. In recent years, a number of commercial buildings have been converted into residential use, including the Fourth and Vine Tower and Macy's Building. Conversion of the Carew Tower into apartments is ongoing.

Most of the city's high-rises are located in Downtown Cincinnati, which is surrounded by Interstate 71 and Interstate 75. The former separates the downtown skyline from the Ohio River to the south. Between Interstate 71 and the river are two of the city's most famous stadiums, the Paycor Stadium and the Great American Ball Park. The University of Cincinnati contains Crosley Tower and the former Sanders Hall. Directly across the Ohio River is Covington, Kentucky, where several few high-rises sit along the river. Cincinnati's skyline was the inspiration for the name of Skyline Chili, a chain of Cincinnati-style chili restaurants. The restaurant's logo features a silhouette of the city's skyline.

== History ==
Number of high-rise buildings by height in Cincinnati by the end of each year, based on the list below. This takes into account two demolished buildings that were once taller than 200 ft (61 m). Click on the legend to toggle a specific height on or off. View chart definition.

== Cityscape ==
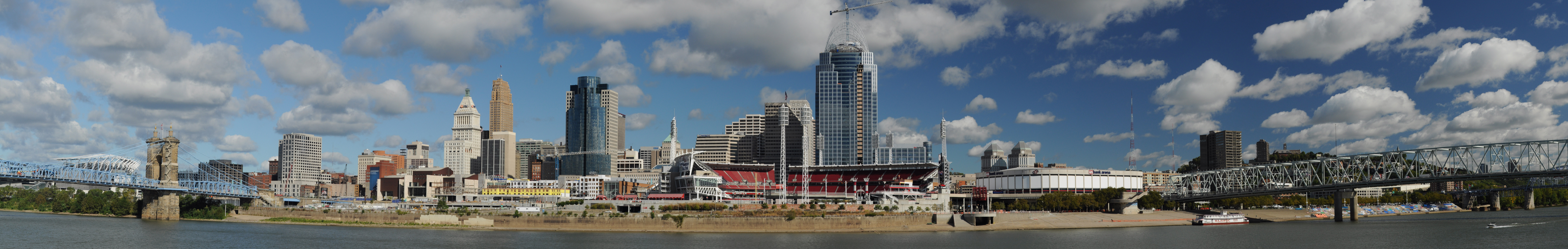
Panorama of Downtown Cincinnati from Covington in 2010, with Great American Tower at Queen City Square (center) still under construction.

== Map of tallest buildings ==
The map below shows the location of buildings taller than 200 ft (61 ft) in Downtown Cincinnati, where the majority of the city's tallest buildings are. Each marker is numbered by the building's height rank, and colored by the decade of its completion. There are five buildings taller than 200 ft (61 m) in Cincinnati that are located outside downtown.

Buildings taller than 200 ft (61 m) in Downtown Cincinnati. An asterisk (*) next to the building's name indicates it is located outside the map.
- 1950s and before
- 1960s
- 1970s
- 1980s
- 1990s
- 2000s
- 2010s
1 Great American Tower at Queen City Square
2 Carew Tower
3 Fourth and Vine Tower
4 Scripps Center
5 Fifth Third Center
6 Center at 600 Vine
7 First Financial Center
8 Hilton Cincinnati Netherland Plaza
9 Columbia Plaza
10 PNC Center
11 US Bank Tower/Westin Hotel
12 Atrium Two
13 36 East Seventh Street
14 Kroger Building
15 Macy's Building
16 525 Vine Center
17 Enquirer Building
18 Edgecliff Point Condos*
19 Proctor and Gamble Tower I
20 Proctor and Gamble Tower II
21 National City Tower
22 Duke Energy Building
23 Terrace Plaza Hotel
24 One Lytle Place
25 Hyatt Regency Cincinnati
26 The American Building
27 Fourth & Walnut Center
28 AT580 Downtown Apartments
29 Bartlett Building
30 Atrium One
31 Cincinnati Times-Star Building
32 Encore
33 The Edgecliff*
34 Crosley Tower*
35 Cincinnati City Hall
36 The Regency*
37 CCHMC Clinical Sciences Pavilion*
38 303 Broadway Tower
39 Tri-State Building
40 Ingalls Building
41 1010 on the Rhine
42 Fourth and Race Tower

== Tallest buildings ==
This list ranks skyscrapers and high-rises in Cincinnati that stand at least 200 feet (61 m) tall, based on standard height measurement. This includes spires and architectural details but does not include antenna masts. The "Year" column indicates the year in which a building was completed. Buildings tied in height are sorted by year of completion with earlier buildings ranked first, and then alphabetically.

Was the tallest building in Cincinnati upon completion

Rank	Name	Image	Location	Height ft (m)	Floors	Year	Purpose	Notes
1	Great American Tower at Queen City Square		301 East 4th Street 39°05′59″N 84°30′26″W	665 (202.7)	41	2011	Office	Third-tallest building in Ohio and the tallest building in Cincinnati. Tallest building completed in Cincinnati in the 2010s.
2	Carew Tower		35 West 5th Street 39°06′03″N 84°30′48″W	574 (175)	49	1930	Residential	The tallest building completed in Cincinnati in the 1930s. Originally built as a mixed-use office and retail building. Currently undergoing conversion to a residential building.
3	Fourth and Vine Tower		1 West 4th Street 39°05′59″N 84°30′47″W	495 (150.9)	31	1913	Residential	Tallest building completed in Cincinnati in the 1910s. When completed, it was the fifth-tallest building in the world, and the tallest building in the world outside of New York City and Philadelphia. Formerly known as the Union Central Life Insurance Company Building and the Central Trust Tower. Also known as PNC Tower (not to be confused with PNC Center).
4	Scripps Center		312 Walnut Street 39°05′57″N 84°30′38″W	468 (142.7)	36	1990	Office	The tallest building completed in Cincinnati in the 1990s.
5	Fifth Third Center		511 Walnut Street 39°06′06″N 84°30′43″W	423 (129)	32	1969	Office	Tallest building completed in Cincinnati in the 1960s. Headquarters of Fifth Third Bank.
6	Center at 600 Vine		600 Vine Street 39°06′11″N 84°30′47″W	418 (127.4)	30	1984	Office	Tallest building completed in Cincinnati in the 1980s.
7	First Financial Tower		255 East 5th Street 39°06′04″N 84°30′30″W	410 (125)	32	1991	Office	Headquarters of First Financial Bank, Roto-Rooter, and Chemed. Also known as Chemed Center.
8	Hilton Cincinnati Netherland Plaza		35 West 5th Street 39°06′03″N 84°30′50″W	372 (113.4)	31	1931	Hotel	Part of the same complex as Carew Tower. Opened as St. Nicholas Plaza in 1931, but has operated under variations of the Netherland Plaza name.
9	Columbia Plaza		250 East 5th Street 39°06′08″N 84°30′31″W	368 (112.2)	29	1984	Office	Formerly known as Chiquita Center, as the former headquarters of Chiquita.
10	PNC Center		201 East 5th Street 39°06′05″N 84°30′33″W	354 (108)	27	1979	Office	Tallest building completed in Cincinnati in the 1970s.
11	US Bank Tower/Westin Hotel		425 Walnut Street 39°06′02″N 84°30′42″W	351 (107)	26	1981	Mixed-use	Mixed-use office and hotel building. Currently hosts a Westin hotel.
12	Atrium Two		221 East 4th Street 39°06′01″N 84°30′29″W	351 (107)	28	1984	Office	
13	The Avant		36 East 7th Street 39°06′15″N 84°30′45″W	324 (98.7)	26	1989	Mixed-use	Mixed-use building. Second Floor Office Space, 12 stories of former office space on top of a 14 story parking garage. Office space is being converted into "The Avant" with 162 residential units opening in late 2026. Conversion visually changed portions of Tower with black paint accents.
14	Kroger Building		1014 Vine Street 39°06′24″N 84°30′50″W	320 (97.5)	25	1960	Office	Headquarters of American retail company Kroger.
15	Macy's Building		7 7th Street 39°06′12″N 84°30′51″W	317 (96.7)	21	1978	Residential	Formerly an office building. Originally built as the Federated Building; headquarters of Macy's, Inc. from 1994 to 2020. Converted into apartments and reopened as 7 West 7th Apartments in 2025.
16	Enquirer Building		312 Elm Street 39°05′54″N 84°30′54″W	312 (95.1)	25	1992	Office	Headquarters of The Cincinnati Enquirer daily newspaper from 1992 to 2022.
17	525 Vine Center		525 Vine Street 39°06′07″N 84°30′49″W	309 (94.2)	23	1985	Office	
18	Edgecliff Point Condos		1201 Edgecliff Point 39°07′12″N 84°29′01″W	284 (86.5)	24	1990	Residential	Located In East Walnut Hills. Not to be confused with The Edgecliff, a 231-foot building nearby.
19	Proctor and Gamble Tower I		301 East 6th Street 39°06′12″N 84°30′20″W	280 (85) (Note: Sources do not state the exact height of this building. This figure was determined using Google Earth by subtracting the altitude of the building's lowest main pedestrian open-air entrance from the highest architectural point.)	17	1985	Office	
20	Proctor and Gamble Tower II		301 East 6th Street 39°06′11″N 84°30′18″W	280 (85)	17	1985	Office	
21	National City Tower		1 East 4th Street 39°05′59″N 84°30′44″W	279 (85.0)	20	1968	Office	Also known as Provident Tower.
22	Duke Energy Building		139 East 4th Street 39°06′00″N 84°30′35″W	272 (82.9)	18	1929	Office	Designed by Cincinnati architectural firm Garber & Woodward and John Russell Pope. Also known as the Cinergy Building.
23	Terrace Plaza Hotel		15 West 6th Street 39°06′08″N 84°30′51″W	272 (82.9)	20	1948	Mixed-use	Contains serviced apartments, as well as office, hotel, and retail space.
24	One Lytle Place		621 East Mehring Way 39°05′58″N 84°30′09″W	269 (82.0)	26	1980	Residential	
25	Hyatt Regency Cincinnati		151 West 5th Street 39°06′01″N 84°30′56″W	260 (79.2)	23	1984	Hotel	
26	The American Building		30 East Central Parkway 39°06′27″N 84°30′48″W	256 (78.0)	18	1928	Office	
27	Fourth & Walnut Center		105 East 4th Street 39°05′59″N 84°30′38″W	255 (77.7)	19	1904	Office	Tallest building completed in Cincinnati in the 1900s. Formerly known as the First National Bank Building and the Clopay Building. Currently undergoing conversion from an office building into a mixed-use hotel and apartment structure.
28	AT580 Downtown Apartments		580 Walnut Street 39°06′08″N 84°30′39″W	252 (77)	17	1973	Residential	Formerly known as the 580 Building. Converted to apartments in 2014.
29	Renaissance Cincinnati Downtown Hotel		36 East 4th Street 39°06′01″N 84°30′42″W	252 (76.8)	19	1901	Hotel	The first early skyscraper to be built in Cincinnati. Sequentially known as the Union Trust Building, Fifth Third Union Trust Building, Fifth Third Bank Building, Fourth and Walnut Building, and Bartlett Building before acquiring its current name. Originally an office building, it was converted into a hotel in 2014.
30	Atrium One		221 East 4th Street 39°06′01″N 84°30′32″W	252 (76.8)	20	1981	Office	
31	Cincinnati Times-Star Building		800 Broadway 39°06′21″N 84°30′25″W	239 (72.9)	15	1933	Office	Also known by its street address, 800 Broadway.
32	Encore		716 Sycamore Street 39°06′18″N 84°30′31″W	238 (72.5)	17	2017	Residential	Previously known as 8th & Sycamore.
33	The Edgecliff		2200 Victory Parkway 39°07′12″N 84°29′07″W	231 (70.4)	26	1960	Residential	Not to be confused with Edgecliffe Point Condos, a 284-foot building nearby.
34	Crosley Tower		301 Clifton Court 39°08′04″N 84°31′00″W	231 (70)	16	1969	Education	Part of the University of Cincinnati. Named after local inventor Powel Crosley Jr.
35	Cincinnati City Hall		801 Plum Street 39°06′15″N 84°31′11″W	228 (69.5)	4	1890	Government	Tallest building in Cincinnati from 1890 to 1901.
36	The Regency	–	2444 Madison Road 39°08′26″N 84°27′14″W	228 (69.5)	20	1967	Residential	
37	Cincinnati Children's Hospital Clinical Sciences Pavilion		240 Albert Sabin Way 39°08′23″N 84°30′10″W	228 (69)	15	2015	Hospital	
38	303 Broadway Tower		303 Broadway 39°05′59″N 84°30′23″W	223 (68)	15	2006	Office	
39	Tri-State Building		432 Walnut Street 39°06′04″N 84°30′40″W	215 (65.5)	15	1903	Office	
40	Ingalls Building		6 East 4th Street 39°06′01″N 84°30′45″W	210 (64)	16	1903	Hotel	World's first reinforced concrete skyscraper.
41	1010 on the Rhine		1010 Walnut St 39°06′26″N 84°30′45″W	205 (62.6)	18	2019	Residential	Contains 8 floors of apartments above a 10 story base, which consists of a 2 floor Kroger Grocery Store and an 8 story parking garage.
42	Fourth and Race Tower	–	101-105 West 4th Street 39°05′58″N 84°30′52″W	200 (61.0)	16	1927	Hotel	

== Tallest under construction or proposed ==
=== Under construction ===
As of Late 2026, The Marriott Convention Hotel is the only building being constructed in the City of Cincinnati and the region that will rise more than 200 feet (61 m). This is the first high rise under construction since 1010 On The Rhine was completed in 2019. The estimated nearly 10-year gap between the two high rises in completion dates will be the longest gap between high rise completions in Cincinnati since the 13-year gap between 312 Elm and 303 Broadway's 1992 and 2005 completions.

Name	Height ft (m)	Floors	Year (est.)	Status	Notes
Marriott Convention Hotel	264 (80.5)	23	Late 2028 or Early 2029	Under Construction	

=== Proposed ===
This table includes buildings that have been proposed or approved to rise at least 200 ft (61 m) tall as of 2026. The year column indicates the estimated year of completion.

Name	Height ft (m)	Floors	Year (est.)	Status	Notes
Banks Tower 1	285 (86.9)*	24	2029-2034	Proposed	In early planning stage
Banks Tower 2	285 (86.9)*	24	2029-2034	Proposed	In early planning stage

== Tallest demolished ==
This table lists buildings that once stood taller than 200 ft (61 m) in Cincinnati that have been demolished.

Name	Image	Height ft (m)	Floors	Year completed	Year demolished	Purpose	Notes
Millennium Hotel Cincinnati North Tower		350 (106.7)	32	1977	2022	Hotel	The hotel closed in 2019, and demolition was completed three years later. Tallest building ever demolished in Cincinnati.
Sander Hall	–	297 (90.5)	27	1971	1991	Residential	When it stood, the building's tip was the highest point in Hamilton County.
Millennium Hotel Cincinnati South Tower		252 (76.8)	22	1968	2022	Hotel	Opened in 1968, 9 years prior to taller North Tower. The hotel closed in 2019, and demolition was completed three years later. South Tower was demolished in conjunction with North Tower.

== Tallest buildings in the Cincinnati metropolitan area ==
Cincinnati metropolitan area
- Population: 2,302,815 (2024 estimate)
- Cities included: Cincinnati, Covington

Number of tall buildings (2026)
- Taller than 100 m (328 ft): 12
- Taller than 150 m (492 ft): 3
- Taller than 200 m (656 ft): 1

Number of tall buildings — feet
- Taller than 200 ft (61.0 m): 44
- Taller than 300 ft (91.4 m): 18

Cincinnati holds the majority of buildings taller than 200 ft (61 m) in its metropolitan area. The remainder are in Covington, Kentucky, and Newport, Kentucky. Both cities are located directly south of Cincinnati across the Ohio River.

Rank	Name	Image	City	Height ft (m)	Floors	Year	Purpose	Notes
1	RiverCenter I		Covington 39°05′25″N 84°30′38″W	308 (94)	19	1990	Office	Tallest building in Covington and in the Cincinnati metropolitan area outside of Cincinnati.
2	The Ascent at Roebling's Bridge		Covington 39°05′21″N 84°30′34″W	293 (89.4)	21	2007	Residential	Tallest residential building in Covington. Noted for its curved roof and striped facade.
3	RiverCenter II		Covington 39°05′25″N 84°30′36″W	292 (89)	17	1998	Office	
4	Madison Place	–	Covington 39°05′23″N 84°30′46″W	267 (81) (Note: Sources do not state the exact height of this building. This figure was determined using Google Earth by subtracting the altitude of the building entrance from the highest architectural point.)	18	2001	Residential	
5	SouthShore Condominiums		Newport	238 (73)	17	2009	Residential	
6	Kenwood Tower		Kenwood	200+	16	2015	Office	

== Tallest unbuilt ==
This table includes former proposals designed to rise at least 200 feet (61 m) that were approved for construction in Cincinnati, but were cancelled or downsized prior to construction.

Name	Image	Location	Height ft (m)	Floors	Project years	Status	Notes
Fountain Square West		505 Vine St	862 (262)	63	1985-86	Canceled	$257 million skyscraper was proposed by Galbreath Co. in 1985 and was a final contender for bidding in the Fountain Square West bid. Was cancelled in May 1986 due to not being picked by final committee after a controversial RFP process. Would have been the Second Tallest Building in Ohio if built. 800,000 sq ft of office space, four floors of retail, 750 space underground parking garage, 250 room hotel.
Fountain Place		505 Vine St	725 (220)	50	1985-1988	Canceled	Federated/Emery were chosen to develop Fountain Square West, naming the development Fountain Place, by the City of Cincinnati in May 1986. Project was estimated at $200 million in cost. Project was cancelled due to the developer defaulting on the development agreement with the City of Cincinnati in September 1988 after 2 years of false starts and tensions between the City of Cincinnati and the group. At 725 ft. it would have been the tallest building in Cincinnati. 705,000 sq ft of office space, 400 room hotel, 1,000 space underground parking garage, 233,000 sq ft of retail.
Fountain Square South		21 E Fifth St	660 (201)	50	1972-1974	Canceled	Tower was proposed in January 1972 by Unit One Co for the SE Corner of Fifth and Vine Streets in Downtown Cincinnati. Project was cancelled in 1974 due to immense pushback by community over destruction of Albee Theater and the height throwing a shadow over Fountain Square. The Westin was later built in the corner this tower would have been built. Albee Theater would be torn down anyways in 1977 despite protest. 50 stories in height, 400 space underground parking garage.
Fountain Square West		505 Vine St.	648 (197)	48	1989-1991	Canceled	Galbreath Co., having been the back up developer if Federated/Emery would drop out was selected again to develop Fountain Square West in late 1989. The $275 million Helmut Jahn designed proposal was unveiled in June 1990. Approved in July 1990. Galbreath was the second developer to default on its development agreement for the long-winding Fountain Square West project, defaulting in February 1991 due to financing difficulties and financial issues with the developer. At 648 ft it would have been the tallest building in Cincinnati. 1.7 million sq ft of office, hotel, retail and parking. 750 space underground garage. City erected a surface parking lot after this proposal fell through in the center of Downtown Cincinnati from 1992 to 1996.
Pluss Holdings Entertainment Center and Office Tower		650 Walnut St	550+ (167+)	46	1988-1990	Canceled	Proposal was accepted by committee in September 1988. Design was fully unveiled in January 1990. $200 million mixed use project would have had a 5-story entertainment center with a 41-story office tower on top. Pluss Holdings defaulted on its development agreement in June 1990 after being unable to secure financing. Block instead became the Aronoff Center.
Temple Tower		142 E Fourth St	470 (143)	40	1929-1930	Canceled	First Presbyterian Church proposed this 470 ft skyscraper in August 1929. $3 million project would have included 32 stories of offices, 8 stories of tower, and a 4-story church at the base. Project was cancelled due to financial difficulties stemming from the Great Depression.
1 East Fourth St		1 East Fourth St	456 (139)	35	1964-1965	Downsized	Project was proposed in September 1964. The $18 million Provident Tower would have been 35 stories and 456 ft tall. 860,162 sq ft total floor area. By late 1965 the project was significantly downsized, with the finished building in 1968 having a markedly different design and height, reaching only 279 ft.
311 Race St. (312 Elm Phase II)		311 Race St	400+ (121+)	30	1990-1993, 1998.	Cancelled	Duke and Associates proposed this project as a second phase and taller twin tower to 312 Elm. Project would have been 30 stories and around 400 ft in height. Project was stalled by early 1993 due to economic factors in Downtown Cincinnati and fully cancelled by the late 1990s.
Fourth and Race Apartment Tower		407 Race St.	300+ (91+)	30	2013-2014	Cancelled	This $82 million 300-unit residential tower with a grocery store was proposed in 2013 by Flaherty and Collins. Council approved the project and subsidy in late 2013. Due to opposition by Mayor Cranley over amount of subsidy, project was scrapped in 2014 with a smaller 4th and Race tower eventually being developed by 3CDC and Flaherty and Collins.
Union Central Annex Tower		309 Vine St	300-350 (91-106)	24	1925-27	Downsized/Cancelled	Annex Tower of the Union Central Tower was approved in January 1926. 24 story office tower would have provided additional space for the Union Central Insurance Co. The 8-story base for the tower was completed in 1927(Now City Club Apartments CBD) but the tower plan was quietly scrapped by the company around the time the base was completed, despite the base being designed for a tower on top.

== Timeline of tallest buildings ==
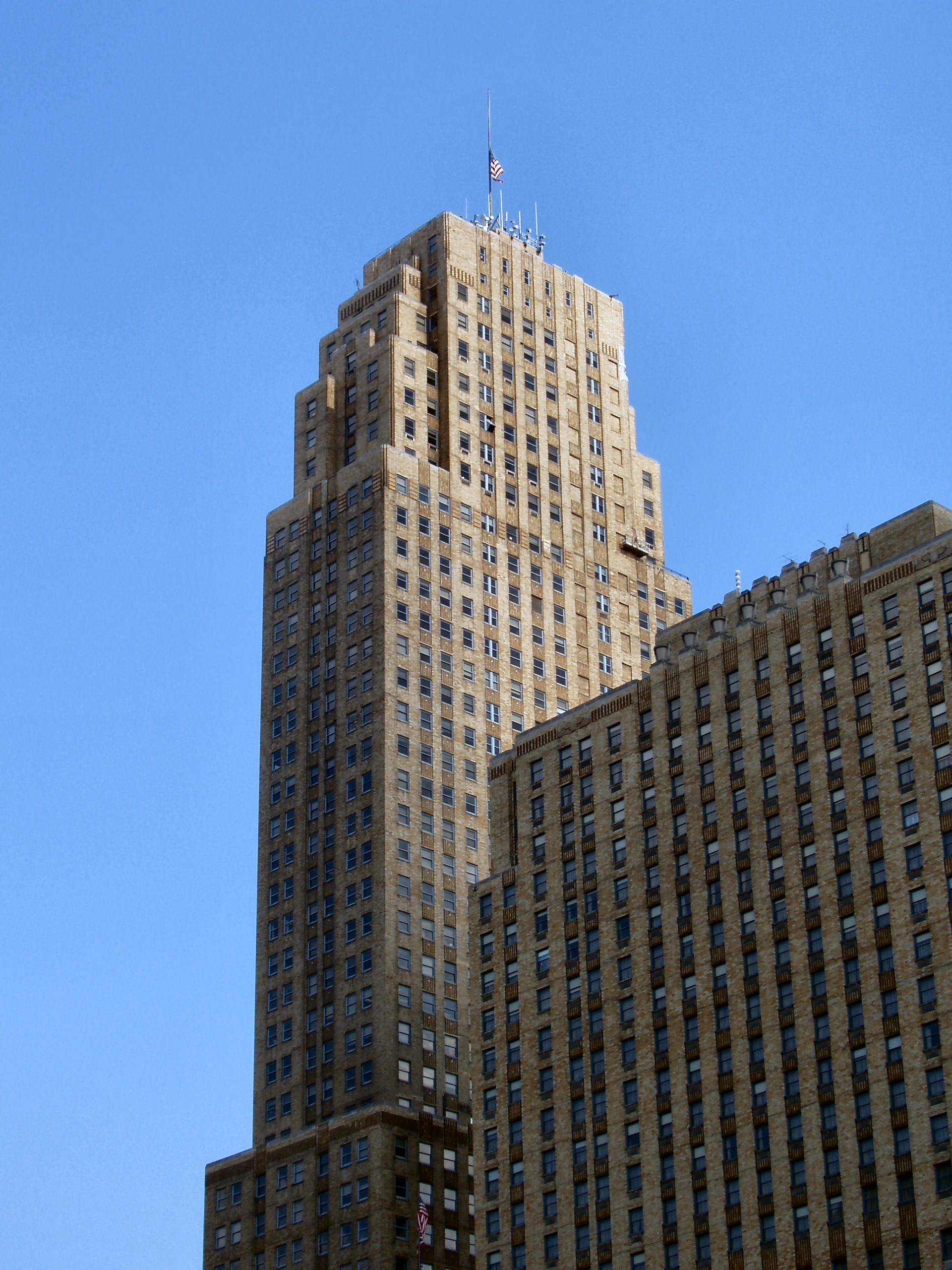
The Carew Tower held the title of the tallest building in Cincinnati for the longest period of time. It was the tallest building for 81 years, from 1930 until 2011

This lists buildings that once held the title of tallest building in Cincinnati.

Name	Image	Street address	Years as tallest	Height ft (m)	Floors	Reference
Cincinnati City Hall		801 Plum Street	1890–1901	228 (69)	4	
Bartlett Building		36 East 4th Street	1901–1904	252 (77)	19	
Fourth & Walnut Center		105 East 4th Street	1904–1913	255 (78)	19	
Fourth and Vine Tower		1 West 4th Street	1913–1930	495 (151)	31	
Carew Tower		35 West 5th Street	1930–2011	574 (175)	49	
Great American Tower at Queen City Square		301 East 4th Street	2011–present	665 (203)	41	

== See also ==
- List of tallest buildings in Ohio
- List of tallest buildings in Akron
- List of tallest buildings in Cleveland
- List of tallest buildings in Columbus
- List of tallest buildings in Dayton
- List of tallest buildings in Toledo, Ohio
