= Macy's Building (Cincinnati) =

Skyscraper in Cincinnati, Ohio, U.S.

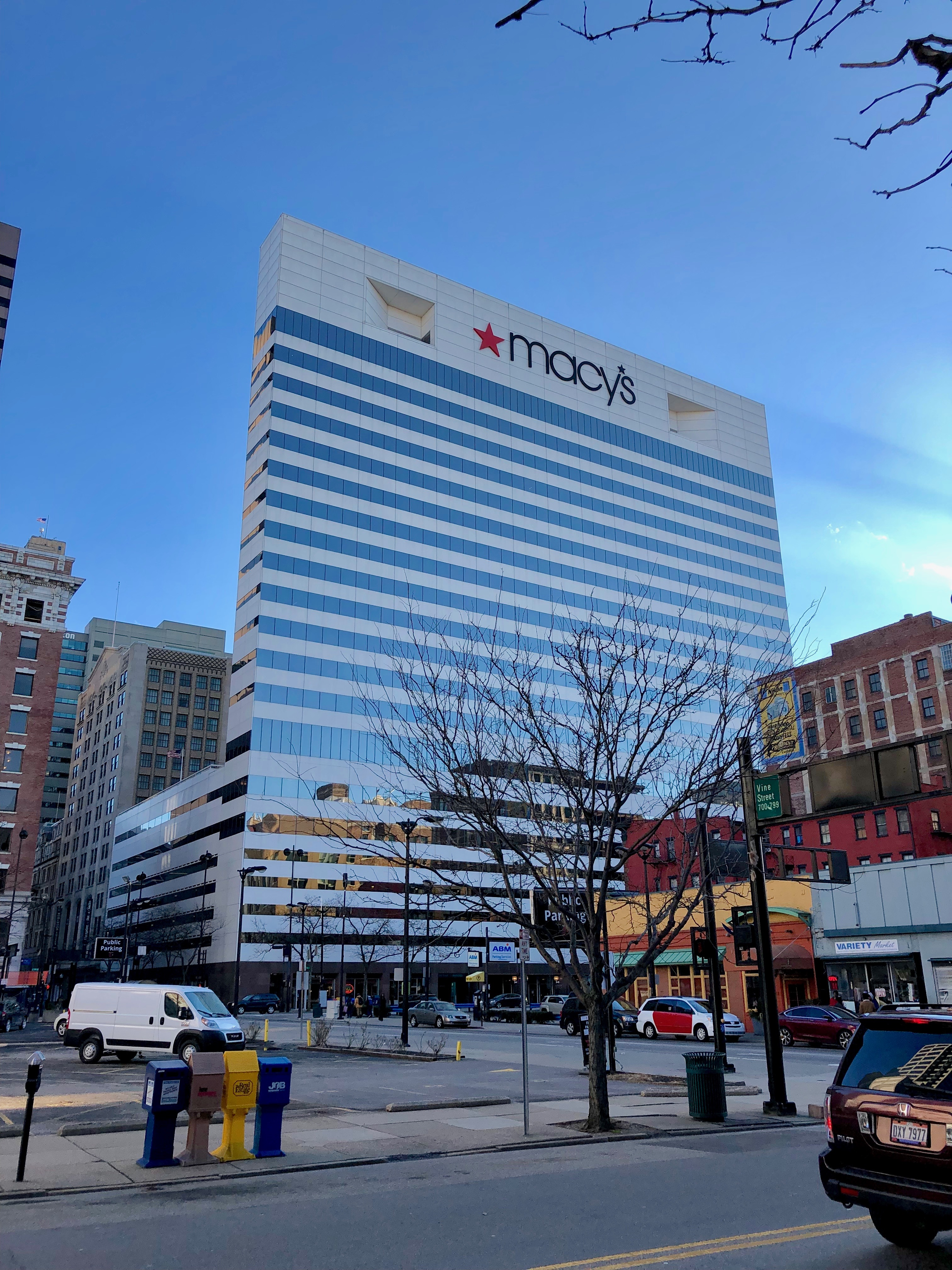
- The Macy's Building in 2019, prior to its residential conversion
- Former names: Federated Building

General information
- Type: Residential
- Architectural style: Postmodern
- Location: 7 West 7th Street; Cincinnati, Ohio
- Coordinates: 39.103259°N 84.51413100000002°W
- Construction started: 1978
- Completed: 1979

Height
- Roof: 96.7 m (317 ft)

Technical details
- Floor count: 21
- Floor area: 364,400 sq ft (33,850 m^{2})

Design and construction
- Architect: Ed Haladay (RTKL Associates)
- Developer: Federated Department Stores, Inc.
- Main contractor: Henry C. Beck, Inc.

The Macy's Building is a postmodern skyscraper in Cincinnati, Ohio. Located in the city's central business district, the 21-floor building stands 96.7 meters (317 feet) tall. Built between 1978 and 1979, the tower was the product of a design–build partnership between contractor Henry C. Beck, Inc. and architect Ed Haladay of RTKL Associates. It was built to house the headquarters of developer Federated Department Stores and was originally named the Federated Building. Federated acquired Macy's in 1994 and rebranded as Macy's, Inc. in 2007, splitting much of its corporate activity between Cincinnati and the old Macy's headquarters in New York City. After Macy's closed its Cincinnati headquarters in 2020 in favor of Macy's Herald Square in New York, the building underwent residential conversion, reopening as 7 West 7th Apartments in 2025.

== History ==
=== Planning and construction ===
On September 16, 1977, The Cincinnati Enquirer heard from "several reliable sources" that Cincinnati-based Federated Department Stores was planning to build a new office building in the city's downtown, which Federated Vice President Robert J. Goethals "[could not] specifically deny". The existing headquarters of Federated, then the largest department store company in the United States, consisted of two stories above a parking garage for subsidiary department store Shillito's at 222 W. Seventh Street. The company had twice acquired new downtown office space in the 17 months prior to the Enquirer's report on September 17, but Goethals stated that Federated was still seeking opportunities for expansion. The new building would reportedly be built above a different, four-story Shillito's garage at the corner of Seventh and Vine Streets. Provisions for a future office tower had been included during the garage's construction in the 1960s. Federated Chairman Ralph Lazarus confirmed that his company intended to build a 19-story office tower above the garage on September 20, which Cincinnati Mayor James T. Luken praised as "another healthy step toward an even greater Cincinnati". Lazarus stated that further details would be revealed after the project was approved by Federated's board of directors.

Though the board did not formally approve the project until September, Federated had already decided to build the tower by April 1 and had begun searching for contractors and designers by July 18. Federated held a competition between seven builder-architect teams to determine which companies would construct and design the tower under a design–build strategy, with Atlanta-based Heery and Heery Co. serving as the independent judge. Federated's six major criteria for selection were "compliance with design constraints", "innovative design", "adherence to construction schedule", "cost", "energy efficiency", and "amenities". Participants were not told the name of the developer or the city where the building would be located. Unsuccessful contractor-architect teams included Turner Construction Co. and Boston's The Architects Collaborative; Frank Messer & Sons and Chicago's C. F. Murphy Inc.; Dugan and Meyers Construction Co. and Chicago's Harry Weese & Partners; Gilbane Building Co., Inc. and St. Louis's HOK; J. A. Jones Construction Co. and New York City's John Carl Warnecke & Associates; and Bob Holder Construction Co. and Birmingham, Michigan's Gunnar Birkerts & Associates. The winners were Dallas-based Henry C. Beck, Inc. for construction and Baltimore-based RTKL, Inc. for design. Ed Haladay of RTKL was the primary designer, while Thomas Gruber was project architect.

Federated officially signed contracts for the tower on November 14. The building was expected to rise to 21 stories and include 350,000 square feet of office space, about 45% of which would be occupied by Federated's 800 corporate employees. The remainder of the space was slated to be rented out, though no other potential tenants were committed at the time. Federated declined to estimate the cost of the building itself, but Lazarus expected to spend $30 million for the entire project, including the cost of moving employees and converting the old headquarters into a computer center. Federated hoped to begin preliminary construction on January 2, 1978, intensify construction that spring, and finish the project by early summer 1979, with the company's leases on other offices scheduled to expire in June 1979.

The building after its topping out on October 26, 1978

Work on the building's foundation was underway by April 15, 1978. By May 3, West Shell, Inc. had been named the leasing agent for the building. An ironworker on the project fell to his death on May 24. A flag and a tree were raised over the building on October 26 to celebrate its topping out. While Federated employees were set to move into the building in late June 1979, interior work was not scheduled for completion until August. Members of Cement Masons Union, Local 524 began picketing outside the building on July 25 to protest Beck's use of a nonmason craftsman to complete a staircase between the 20th and 21st floors. The dispute was resolved on July 27 after Beck agreed to pay the union for the work. Except for the executive offices and the street-level entrance, the building was "pretty well completed" by September 1, and the entire project was scheduled to finish by mid-October.

=== Commercial use ===
The Federated Building was open to employees by June 23, 1979, by which time Federated's print shop staff was already present in the building. Federated's employees were expected to continue moving into the tower during the remainder of June and throughout July, departing their offices in four other downtown locations. Federated intended to occupy the eighth through 15th floors as well as floors 20 and 21.

Canadian Robert Campeau purchased Federated Department Stores in April 1988, stopping an attempt by Macy's to acquire the company. Macy's had planned to move Federated to New York, but Campeau retained the Federated Building as the company's headquarters. In April 1989, Campeau's Campeau Corporation underwent a major restructuring that converted it from an operating company to a holding company. As part of this restructuring, Campeau replaced many of his Canadian executives with Cincinnati-based employees, making the Federated Building the base of his American ventures. Federated declared bankruptcy on January 15, 1990, and the Federated Building was listed for sale without an asking price that day.

Federated acquired Macy's in 1994, but Macy's corporate headquarters was projected to remain in New York. New York-based Terry Lundgren became Federated CEO in 2003, replacing Cincinnati-based James Zimmerman. Federated denied that Lundgren's promotion signified a move away from Cincinnati as its headquarters, stating that it had maintained "a bifurcated corporate structure for years... Cincinnati is the corporate headquarters and will remain the corporate headquarters well into the future". Federated rebranded as Macy's, Inc. in 2007. Under a "dual headquarters" structure, Macy's merchandising and marketing were based in New York while accounting, legal services, human resources, and real estate remained in Cincinnati. In 2016, the Enquirer questioned if Cincinnati would continue to be the official corporate headquarters, with 13 of 15 executive management team members residing outside of the Cincinnati area. By 2020, the majority of Macy's top 15 executives were New Yorkers, and none were based in Cincinnati.

In February 2020, Macy's announced that it would depart Cincinnati as a cost-cutting measure, leaving Macy's Herald Square in New York as the company's corporate headquarters. Most of the approximately 500 employees at the Macy's Building were relocated to Springdale. Cincinnati Mayor John Cranley referred to the closure as "disappointing", but stated that "functionally, Macy's stopped using Cincinnati as their headquarters ten years ago". Vice Mayor Christopher Smitherman estimated that the closure would deprive the city of $500,000 in payroll tax revenue per year. The company's signage was removed from the building in September 2021, which WLWT referred to as "a noticeable change to the Cincinnati skyline".

=== Residential conversion ===
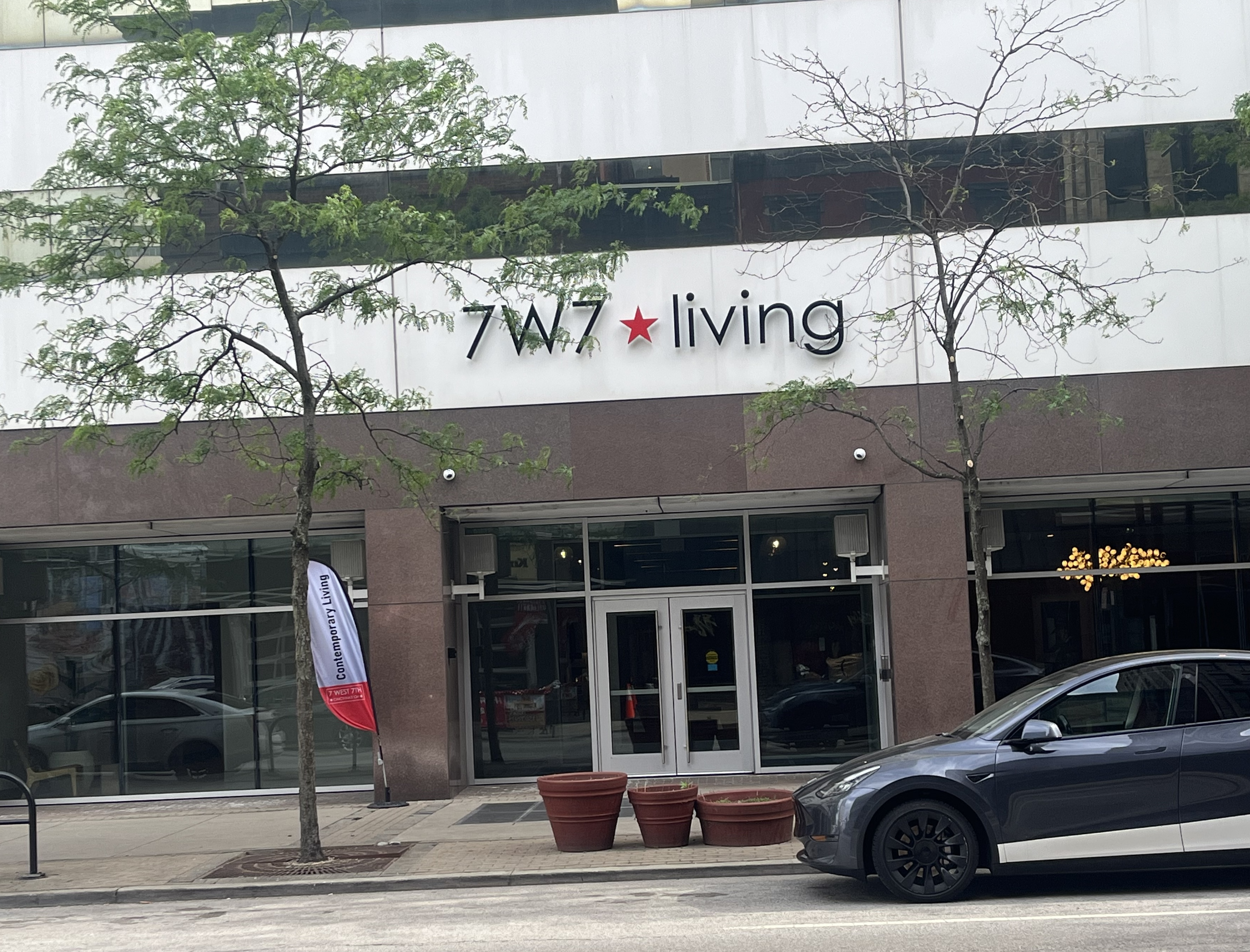
Entrance to 7 West 7th Apartments

In October 2021, New York developer Victrix LLC submitted a plan to convert the tower into a residential building with 338 units and a 394-space parking garage. Victrix requested tax increment financing for the project, which was estimated to cost $73 million. In January 2022, Victrix agreed to a yearly contribution of $124,510 to the Cincinnati streetcar and $272,921 to Cincinnati Public Schools for 30 years in exchange for a 30-year tax abatement from the city government. The tax exemption was unanimously approved by the Cincinnati City Council. The city estimated that the residents of the converted building would generate up to $1 million in income tax. The building had been valued at $22 million in 2020, but Victrix purchased it for $10 million in March 2022. The Port of Greater Cincinnati Development Authority approved $60 million in bonds for the project in September 2023.

The building reopened as 7 West 7th Apartments on April 16, 2025. The redesigned structure features 341 apartment units with an outdoor terrace, a gym, and a lounge where the executive offices had previously been located. At the building's ribbon-cutting ceremony, Mayor Aftab Pureval stated that it was "the largest housing project in the city", which was "all part of our strategy to go from downtown being almost exclusively a commerce center to a real neighborhood".

== Architecture ==
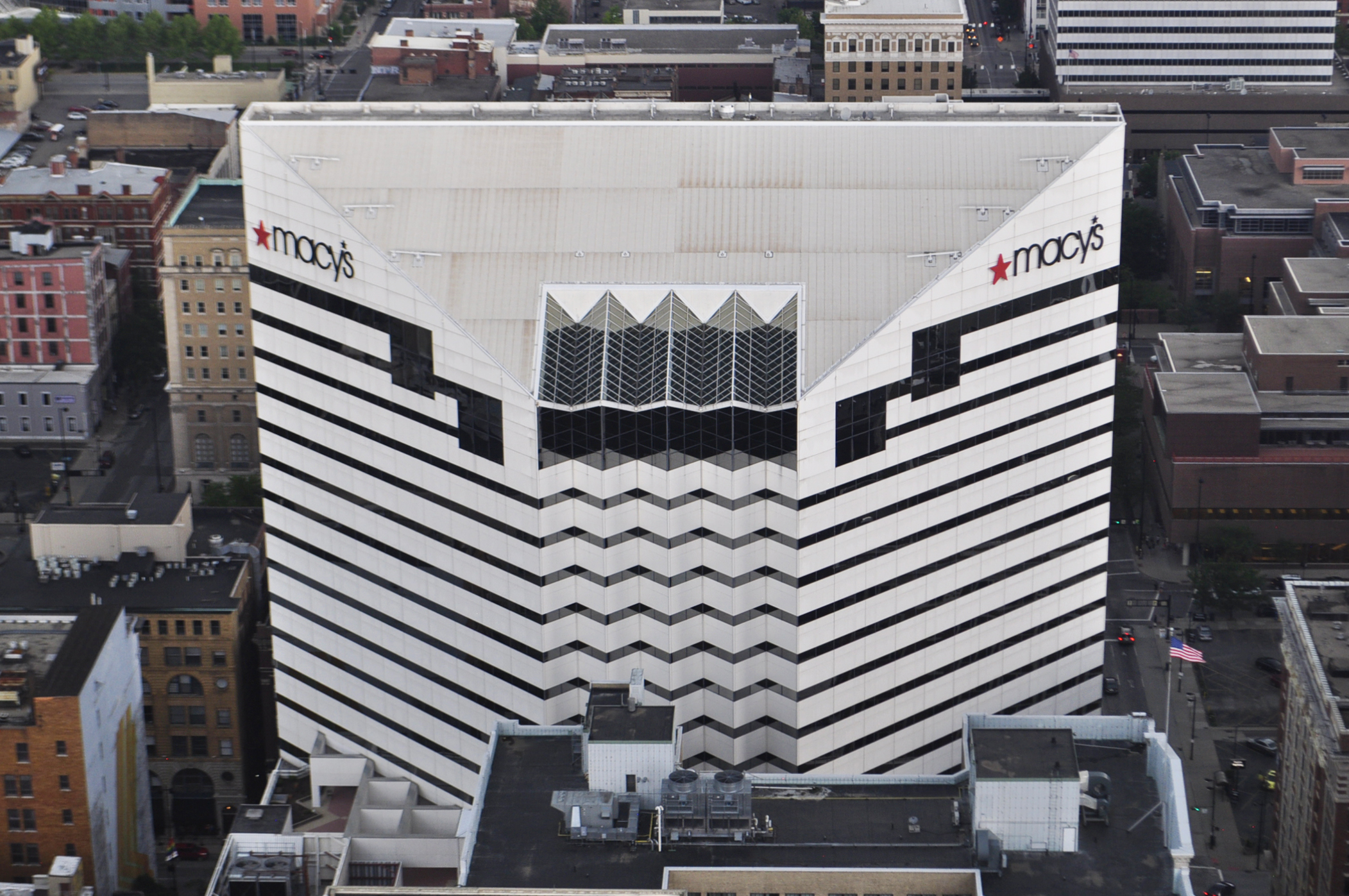
The rear of the building with Macy's signage in 2018

The tower is an example of postmodern architecture. Its design was influenced by the Citicorp Center in New York City and Pennzoil Place in Houston. The tower's exterior facade consists of a curtain wall of white aluminum and mirrored glass. The building is circled by horizontal bands of windows, which are 6 feet 6 inches high on the north face and 6 feet 3 inches high on the south face. The "truncated triangle" shape of the building was chosen because a rectangular structure would have resembled the nearby Terrace Plaza Hotel and would also have had its views of the Ohio River blocked by the Terrace Plaza and the Cincinnati Enquirer Building. Its roof is chamfered. It contains 21 floors and stands 96.7 meters (317 feet) tall, with a floor area of about 364,400 square feet. The building was constructed directly above a seven-story parking garage.

== See also ==
- List of tallest buildings in Cincinnati
- Carew Tower, another Cincinnati skyscraper acquired by Victrix LLC for residential conversion
