= Renaissance Cincinnati Downtown Hotel =

Building in Cincinnati, Ohio

- The Renaissance Cincinnati Downtown Hotel in 2019
- Former names: Bartlett Building; Union Trust Building; Fifth Third Union Trust Building

Record height
- Tallest in Cincinnati from 1901 to 1904^{[I]}
- Preceded by: Johnston Building
- Surpassed by: Fourth & Walnut Center

General information
- Status: Completed
- Type: Hotel
- Architectural style: Commercial
- Location: 36 East 4th Street. Cincinnati, Ohio
- Coordinates: 39.1003°N 84.5115°W
- Completed: 1901
- Operator: Columbia Sussex

Height
- Antenna spire: 252 ft (76.8 m)
- Roof: 239 ft (72.8 m)

Technical details
- Floor count: 17
- Floor area: 266,000 sq ft
- Lifts/elevators: 9

Design and construction
- Architects: D.H. Burnham & Company; Graham, Anderson, Probst & White
- Union Trust Building
- U.S. National Register of Historic Places
- Area: 0.4 acres (0.2 ha)
- Architects: Burnham, D.H. & Co.; Graham, Anderson, Probst & White
- NRHP reference No.: 08000802
- Added to NRHP: August 29, 2008

The Renaissance Cincinnati Downtown Hotel is a Commercial Style building in Cincinnati, Ohio, located at 4th & Walnut Street in the city's downtown. The first early skyscraper to be built in Cincinnati, the 17-story tower was the tallest building in the state for 3 years until it was surpassed by the First National Bank Building.

Designed by D. H. Burnham & Company on behalf of the Union Savings Bank and Trust Company, the skyscraper opened as the Union Trust Building in 1901. Two major expansions, both designed by the successor firm of D. H. Burnham & Company, were built in 1914 and 1932. After Union Trust merged with Fifth Third Bank in 1927, the tower was initially renamed the Fifth Third Union Trust Building before being designated the Fifth Third Bank Building in 1955. Fifth Third left the structure in 1969, after which the tower became the Fourth and Walnut Building. It was purchased by Bartlett & Co. in 1985 and was known as the Bartlett Building for the remainder of its time as an office structure. The building was added to the National Register of Historic Places in 2008. The tower was converted into a hotel in 2014 under the Renaissance Hotels brand.

== History ==
=== Planning and construction ===
By March 11, 1899, J.G. Schmidlapp and A.B. Voorheis had purchased a plot of land measuring 97 feet on Walnut Street and 106 feet on Fourth Street from the Gibson estate for $350,000. Schmidlapp and Voorheis, who were respectively president and vice president of the Union Savings Bank and Trust Company, announced plans to construct a new commercial building on the land that would stand at least 12 stories tall and cost $500,000. In late March, Schmidlapp and Voorheis met with New York City-based architect George B. Post, leading to speculation among local architects that Union Trust planned to hire a non-Cincinnatian for the project. Chicago architectural firm D. H. Burnham & Company, led by Daniel Burnham, was ultimately hired to design the building. The National Park Service states that it is unclear which architect within the firm designed the structure, but it speculates that it may have been Frederick P. Dinkelberg, as he later worked on a D. H. Burnham & Company project in Cincinnati. A 1912 article in The Cincinnati Post identified E. R. Graham as "the architect of the building".

The design for the building was completed on July 13, and the plans were submitted to Union Trust for review by July 21. These plans included 17 stories instead of a previous proposal of 16, a "palatial" aesthetic with elaborate ornamentation, and a "conservative" minimum cost of $1,000,000. According to The Cincinnati Enquirer, the plans indicated that the building would "eclipse anything in the West". By September 29, plans for the building had been officially submitted to Cincinnati's Building Inspector's Office with an estimated cost of $250,000. T. Nicholson & Sons Co. was listed as the building's primary contractor. The building was given a permit on October 6 after the Inspector's Office raised the cost estimate to up to $450,000.

Groundbreaking occurred in October. Three buildings on the site were demolished to make way for the new structure. The skyscraper's cornerstone-setting ceremony was held on April 28, 1900. The stone contained a bronze time capsule filled with a variety of objects, such as copies of Cincinnati newspapers, plans of the building, and photographs of politicians. President Herman Gopper of the Commercial Club smoothed the mortar on the stone with a silver trowel that was subsequently gifted to Schmidlapp, while Voorheis delivered remarks on Schmidlapp's behalf. The ceremony's principal speaker was James E. Mooney, who stated that "the laying of the corner stone of a great modern commercial temple, to be erected on this site, which we have just witnessed, marks, as I believe, the beginning of a new era in the progressive development of this great industrial metropolis".

"Present Condition of the Big Skyscraper", a sketch of the building as it appeared around June 24, 1900

By early May, three labor disputes were affecting the project. The first was triggered by Nicholson's hiring of nonunion hodcarriers. The second involved a conflict with the Architectural Iron Workers' Union over wage increases. The third strike, scheduled for May 7, was a sympathetic response to an ongoing dispute between the Chicago Contractors' Association and the Chicago Building Trades Council, as many of the project's workers were from Chicago. A resolution to the Iron Workers' Union pay dispute was ratified on May 8. Schmidlapp and Voorheis helped arrange for an end to the strikes, and the agreements were endorsed by the Building Trades Council on May 9.

The structural steel framework of the skyscraper was completed on June 30. By that time, exterior masonry had advanced to the eighth floor, and the entire building was projected to be enclosed within 30 days. On July 14, the workers were ordered to add an additional story to the building, bringing it to 18 floors. A strike by building mechanics on the project was resolved on October 3.

=== Union Trust use and first addition ===
Union Trust moved into the skyscraper on January 1, 1901. The company declined to have a formal opening ceremony for the building, instead deciding to resume its standard public-facing operations on January 2.

The Union Trust Building, labeled "2", after its upper floors were scorched by a December 10, 1912 fire in the Gibson House, labeled "1". The Rendigs-Lothmann Company's plot, labeled "3", was obtained by Union Trust the following year for an addition to its skyscraper

On December 10, 1912, a fire destroyed the adjacent Gibson House hotel before spreading to the Union Trust Building. Firefighters struggled to suppress the blaze above the twelfth story, and 45 cleaning women became trapped on the top floor. Several of the women were preparing to jump to their deaths when they were rescued by firefighters; no lives were ultimately lost in the skyscraper. Schmidlapp estimated $50,000 in damages to the building, while losses for building tenants were estimated at $150,000. The tenant that suffered the most damages was architect Gustave W. Drach. Building architect E. R. Graham, after surveying the structure the day after the fire, stated that it was "6%" damaged. Schmidlapp stated that 80% of tenants would be able to immediately return to the building and 95% could return within two weeks.

The Union Trust Building became overcrowded as its namesake company grew its operations and demand remained high for downtown office space, prompting Union Trust to consider expanding the skyscraper. On May 9, 1913, Union Trust bought a plot of land to the west of the Union Trust Building for $200,000 from the William Miller estate. The plot, valued at $143,130, had been the home of the Rendigs-Lothmann Company, which was destroyed in the 1912 fire and had a valuation of $15,000. At the time, the Union Trust Building's original plot was valued at $692,250, while the structure itself was valued at $700,000. The purchase ended plans by the Miller heirs to commission a new six-story building that was to be designed by Tietig & Lee. The Enquirer reported that Union Trust intended to build an 18-story addition to the Union Trust Building on the land at a cost of least $300,000. Graham, Burnham & Co., the successor to D. H. Burnham & Company, was hired to design the addition.

On September 9, the Enquirer reported that Union Trust's executive committee would soon "take up the question" of building the addition, as Schmidlapp had recently returned from a trip to Europe. The architects requested that Cincinnati Building Commissioner Rapp review plans for the addition later that month. Rapp refused to examine the plans unless Union Trust agreed to upgrade the fireproofing of the existing building. His specific demands were for the elevator shafts and stairways to be enclosed, for wooden window sashes in the building's court to be replaced with metal ones, and for standard windows in the court to be replaced with wired glass. At a conference with Rapp and the architects on September 23, Schmidlapp agreed to Rapp's requests, after which Rapp agreed to review the addition plans.

On March 13, 1914, the Enquirer learned that the architects of the addition had received permission from Union Trust to begin awarding contracts. By March 27, Wilke & Hogue of Chicago had been hired as the project's general contractor. A permit for the addition was issued on May 9, by which time the estimated cost had been reduced to $200,000. An American flag was raised over the addition on August 5 to celebrate its topping out, with workers having laid roughly one floor of steel per day. On December 28, the Enquirer reported that the addition was "nearing completion".

=== Fifth Third use and second addition ===
1929 sketch of the planned banking lobby of the second addition

Union Trust combined its stocks with Fifth Third Bank in 1919, though the banks remained officially separate. Union Trust and Fifth Third formally merged into the Fifth Third Union Trust Company in 1927 while maintaining distinct offices. The skyscraper's full name thus became the Fifth Third Union Trust Building. On October 14, 1929, Fifth Third Union Trust purchased property between the west side of the building and an alley off of Fourth Street. That same day, the bank's vice president announced plans to raze the two structures on the plot and build a 17-story addition to the Union Trust Building, which would be accompanied by a remodel of the existing banking space. The addition was slated to increase floor space by 35% and facilitate the consolidation of Fifth Third Union Trust's offices into one building, ending the need to occupy Fifth Third's pre-merger headquarters. The expansion was projected to be completed the following year.

Burnham's firm, by that time renamed Graham, Anderson, Probst & White, was again hired to design the new addition. The Ferro Concrete Construction Company served as the general contractor. On July 10, 1930, demolition of the existing buildings on the plot began and plans for the addition were filed with Building Commissioner C. M. Stenger. The addition was estimated to cost $750,000. On March 11, 1931, the bank asked Stenger for a permit for $800,000 in renovations to the existing Union Trust Building. Portions of the annex were already occupied by the beginning of 1932 as construction continued. On May 28 and 29, 1932, millions of dollars were transferred from Fifth Third's old headquarters at 14 West Fourth Street to the Union Trust Building under the protection of 80 armed guards, which the Enquirer contemporaneously stated was "probably the largest movement of monetary wealth through Cincinnati's streets at one time". After over a year of construction, Fifth Third was scheduled to begin operations in the completed building on May 31 and formally dedicate the structure on June 1.

The building underwent a modernization effort in the 1950s. By March 5, 1954, the Union Trust Building's manager had informed tenants that the skyscraper would be renamed the Fifth Third Bank Building, effective January 1, 1955. The purpose of the name change was to "capitalize on the popular usage of the bank name".

Fifth Third announced on May 11, 1966, that it had agreed to negotiate a lease in a new building that the Cincinnati Redevelopment Corporation planned to build on Fountain Square. Ahead of its expected relocation, Fifth Third sold the Fifth Third Bank Building to the Dayton, Ohio-based Miller family on March 3, 1967 for an undisclosed price. The Millers agreed to lease part of the building back to Fifth Third until the bank was ready to move. The tower was expected to retain its name until after Fifth Third left. Fifth Third was scheduled to move to its new headquarters on December 15, 1969, though it planned to continue operating a branch in the Fifth Third Bank Building.

=== Commercial use after Fifth Third ===
The entrance of the skyscraper with "Bartlett Building" signage in 2009

After Fifth Third's departure, the Fifth Third Bank Building was renamed the Fourth and Walnut Building. In September 1973, the Southwest Ohio Regional Transit Authority authorized plans to move its headquarters to the tower. By June 5, 1985, the skyscraper had been sold for $8.5 million to a joint venture consisting of the investment counseling firm Bartlett & Co. and two of the real estate partnerships that it advised. Bartlett planned to invest millions of dollars into a renovation of the building, which was to be coordinated by Columbus, Ohio-based architect Tom Converse. Bartlett also expressed interest in connecting it to the Cincinnati Skywalk at an unspecified point in the future. Bartlett planned to lease two floors in the building and move in the following year. By March 1986, Bartlett had moved into the skyscraper, which had been redesignated the Bartlett Building.

On December 10, 1990, Bartlett stated that it would purchase the 350-spot Commerce Garage from Dayton investor Jervis Janney for an undisclosed price. The deal was expected to conclude December 28. The purchase disrupted plans by Indianapolis-based Duke Associates to construct a 35-story companion skyscraper to 312 Elm, an adjacent office tower that it was building. Bartlett stated that its purchase of the garage was intended to fulfill the parking demands of Bartlett Building tenants and that it did not intend to sell the garage to Duke. The garage was subsequently renamed the Bartlett Garage.

By 1991, the Bartlett Building was one of several older "Class B" office structures in Cincinnati affected by a downturn in the real estate market. That year, the building began a $70,000 restoration, a tactic that the Enquirer referred to as the "key to survival" for Class B structures. The renovation included an uncovering of the ornate domed roof of the building's mezzanine, which had been concealed by a dropped ceiling for almost fifty years. The removal of the dropped ceiling was facilitated by the closure of brokerage Thompson McKinon, which vacated 10,000 square feet on the mezzanine level. Occupancy was about 85% at the time of the restoration. The Cincinnati Stock Exchange left the building for Chicago in 1995.

Chicago developer Sterling Phoenix Development VI LLC purchased the Bartlett Building for $8.2 million in March 2006. At the time, the buyer stated that it was planning a $4 million renovation of the tower, with the lobby and ballroom highlighted as targets.

=== Failed hotel conversion, bankruptcy, and closure ===
On September 26, 2007, Sterling Phoenix announced that it was considering converting the building into a hotel. The 30 tenants that occupied the skyscraper were told to vacate by October 2008. The hotel conversion plans lead American Airlines, the largest tenant, to announce that it would close its Cincinnati reservation center upon the expiration of its lease in the building. The center's 450 employees, who handled roughly 10% of all of American Airlines' calls, were given the option of working from home or relocating to other cities. Bartlett & Co. left its namesake building for the Center at 600 Vine following the notice to vacate.

Sterling Phoenix affiliate Carnegie Realty filed for Chapter 7 bankruptcy in November. Among the company's listed creditors was Duke Energy, which was owed $227,297. In December, Duke threatened to cut off the Bartlett Building's electricity and gas due to Sterling Phoenix's failure to pay utility bills. American Airlines filed a lawsuit against Sterling Phoenix in the Hamilton County Court of Common Pleas on December 28. To "avoid [the] calamity across its national operations" that would have followed a loss of utilities, the airline stated that it paid the $65,000 Duke bill on Sterling Phoenix's behalf. American asked the court to place the building under receivership.

On January 11, 2008, American agreed to put its push for a receivership on hold following an agreement with Sterling Phoenix. Under the terms of the deal, Sterling Phoenix would immediately pay off its debt to Duke and address a variety of maintenance issues with the building. Maintenance problems included a lack of hot water, "disheveled" bathrooms, and dirty windows, which were mentioned "at length" by multiple tenants at a court hearing on January 9. If American found Sterling Phoenix's efforts to be insufficient at any point after January 18, U.S. District Court Judge Susan J. Dlott would appoint consultant George W. Fels of Blue Ash as receiver.

On July 9, Sterling Phoenix lawyer Mark Belongia confirmed that the group was committed to a hotel conversion, though he refused to comment on which company would run the hotel. According to a lawyer for American, tenants were told that Sterling Phoenix wanted the Renaissance Hotels division of Marriott International as a partner. On July 17, Dlott appointed James M. Collier of 4th Street Development LLC as the building's receiver after American protested Sterling Phoenix's handling of fire alarms. Plans for the hotel conversion had been troubled by a weak credit environment, and Belongia stated that "it's going to take more time to effectuate any type of development plan". In light of the delayed conversion, "everyone agreed the best solution would be to have a receiver appointed", according to Belongia. With the conversion paused, tenants were no longer required to leave the building, though most were already planning to do so.

The building's mortgage holders, Fifth Third Bank and Chicago-based Bartlett Acquisition LLC, initiated foreclosure proceedings against Sterling Phoenix on July 22. According to the foreclosure filing, the mortgage holders were owed $3 million and $5 million, respectively. Sterling Phoenix also owed the Hamilton County government $594,788.55 in back property taxes. A judge agreed to place the property under involuntary bankruptcy, making a bankruptcy sale under a court-appointed trustee an option. After Duke again threatened to cut utilities in August, American and the mortgage holders paid the $36,000 July bill in order to maintain power until the end of the month, after which American would complete its departure from the building. A Fifth Third spokesperson confirmed that the bank was considering selling the building.

The exterior of the building in 2009, with remaining retailers visible

On April 27, 2009, bankruptcy trustee Eric Goering informed tenants that the building was financially unable to remain open, as it was not generating enough revenue to cover operating costs and the creditors were no longer willing to provide funds. Remaining tenants, which included a men's clothing store, a gift shop, a jeweler, a Jimmy John's, and a CVS Pharmacy, were told that failure to vacate the building by May 15 would be at their own "risk, peril, and detriment". At the time, an offer to purchase the building had been made, but Goering declined to provide specifics about the proposed sale.

Ahead of an August 24 court hearing, Chicago-based Prime Group Inc. offered to purchase the building for $7.5 million, which was approved by Judge Jeffery Hopkins. The buyer planned to revive the hotel conversion concept. Prime's demands included state and federal tax credits that would respectively cover 25 and 20 percent of renovation costs, $15 million in "tax increment financing, urban renewal, or other government assistance" from the city of Cincinnati, and a lease to 150 parking spaces in a city-owned garage. Prime ultimately withdrew its offer.

The abandoned bank vault in 2013

Prime Group made a second offer of $1.5 million in March 2010, far below the $12 million that Sterling Phoenix owed. Despite this, Goering urged Hopkins to accept the sale, stating that multiple prior offers have failed and that "the building is deteriorating and requires substantial investment". Prime expressed its intention to continue using the building as an office structure, having judged that the "numbers didn't work" for a hotel conversion. The Jimmy John's, one of the last two tenants, filed a motion against the deal for canceling its lease five years early. The purchase contract included a requirement that Prime pay the building's operating costs; the sale was canceled in May after the buyer failed to do so. In early June, Goering filed a notice of abandonment in U.S. Bankruptcy Court for the Southern District of Ohio, stating that there was "no equity in the building... for the benefit of the unsecured creditors". Control of the tower subsequently returned to Sterling Phoenix. Duke cut power to the building on June 21, forcing the last remaining tenant—the Jimmy John's—to close.

=== Successful hotel conversion ===
A guest room in the converted building in 2015

An affiliate of Columbus real estate firm E.V. Bishoff Co. acquired the Bartlett Building on February 8, 2013, for $535,000, ending the tower's five-year legal struggle. On February 27, the Cincinnati City Council approved a request by Crestview Hills, Kentucky-based Columbia Sussex to seek tax credits for a hotel conversion of the building. Filings with the City Council in May revealed further details about the $33 million conversion, including that it was slated to have 312 rooms, begin construction that July and conclude by September 2014, attain silver LEED status in exchange for an exemption from increased property taxes, and bring in $80,535 in annual income tax from 125 full-time employees. The conversion received $5 million in historic preservation tax credits from the state government in June. Construction began by March 1, 2014.

On July 25, 2014, the building had a "soft opening" as the Renaissance Cincinnati Downtown Hotel, though work on the conversion was not yet finalized. It featured 283 guest rooms, 40 suites, eight meeting rooms, and nearly 14,400 square feet of total meeting space. The hotel's restaurant was named D. Burnham's in honor of building architect Daniel Burnham. The hotel's grand opening took place on August 26, with interim City Manager Scott Stiles referring to it as a "priceless addition" to Cincinnati. The conversion ultimately cost about $50 million.

== Architecture ==
=== Structure ===
Diagram showing the building's dimensions and evolution over time

The Renaissance Cincinnati Downtown Hotel occupies a lot that measures 198 feet (60 m) east-west and 97 feet (30 m) north-south. Its original 1901 steel frame structure formed an "L" shape that was 106 feet (32 m) long east-west and 97 feet (30 m) long north-south, with each "leg" of the L extending for about 68 feet (21 m) feet. The 1914 expansion added a full-height, steel frame additon to the west that was 38 feet (12 m) long and 94 feet (29 m) deep, giving the building a "U"-shaped appearance. Another full-height, steel frame addition was added to the west in the early 1930s with a length of 58 feet (18 m) and a depth of 68 feet (21 m).

The building has 17 above-ground stories as well as a full basement and a partial mechanical subbasement. According to a 1903 article in The Cincinnati Enquirer, the building stands 231 feet (70 m) in height "from the pavement to the first cornice work", while it is 243 feet (74 m) tall "from the pavement to the top of the roof". In 2008, the National Park Service stated that the tower was 231 feet tall. The first early skyscraper to be built in Cincinnati, it was the tallest building in both the city and the state of Ohio at the time of its construction. It was more than twice the height of Cincinnati's previous tallest building, the six-story Johnston Building, which was built around 1876. The tower was surpassed in height by the 19-story First National Bank Building in 1904.

=== Exterior ===
The Renaissance Cincinnati Downtown Hotel is an example of Commercial Style architecture with "Classical Revival overtones". The building's exterior has a tripartite composition, with a base, a shaft, and an attic. The base, which is made of marble, occupies the first three floors. The 11-story shaft is made of marble on the fourth floor and brick on the remaining levels. The three-story attic is clad in terracotta.

One of the main entrances to the building

The building has two main facades, the larger of which faces Fourth Street to the south and the smaller of which faces Walnut Street to the east. The Fourth Street facade has ten bays, which are divided by pilasters. Four of these bays were added by the 1931 expansion, but are nearly identical to the other six apart from being slightly thinner and having a different hue. The Walnut Street facade has five bays. The windows in the main facades are divided into groups of three and display stone sills with square lintels. The original windows were double-hung sash windows with wooden frames; they were replaced by similar windows with anodized aluminum frames in 1986. On the fifteenth floor, the central window in each bay has a pediment. The sill lines of floors two, four, five, fifteen, and seventeen feature belt courses with classical detailing. The western and northern facades are "utilitarian" with one-over-one windows.

The 1931 expansion added Art Deco influences to the building. The redesigned Fourth and Walnut Street entrances, which are nearly identical, display this influence with fluted and polished granite surrounds and stylized sculptures of eagles in their keystones. The doorways are bronze with multi-light transoms. At the time, the storefronts on either side of the main entrances featured polished granite bulkheads with bronzed window frames and recessed entryways. After a modernization effort in the 1950s, the storefront facings were updated to include reddish polished marble, while the frames and doors became brushed aluminum.

=== Interior ===
The barrel vault ceiling of the main banking lobby, added by the second addition

Following the 1930s addition, the basement and floors two through five were dedicated to banking purposes. The basement, which is clad in marble, contained the bank's safe deposit boxes. The marble-clad main lobby features western and eastern bronzed elevator banks and decorative plaster cornices. The second floor houses the former main banking room, which is topped by a "dramatic" barrel vault ceiling surrounded by a mezzanine floor. Modernization in the 1950s removed most of the marble from the banking room and concealed its vaulted ceiling, but restoration efforts that began in the 1980s returned much of the original architecture.

The upper floors, from the sixth story up, were originally built for office use. From the eastern elevator lobby on these floors, a double loaded corridor stretches westward. A north-south corridor intersects this east-west corridor near its midline in order to serve the 1914 addition, with some floors also having a shortened north-south corridor from the east end of the elevator lobby. The corridors are lined with marble, which has a slightly different color in the later additions. The offices within these corridors varied in design to suit different tenants.

== See also ==
- List of tallest buildings in Cincinnati
- East Fourth Street Historic District
- West Fourth Street Historic District
