= PNC Center (Cincinnati) =

Office building in Cincinnati, Ohio, US

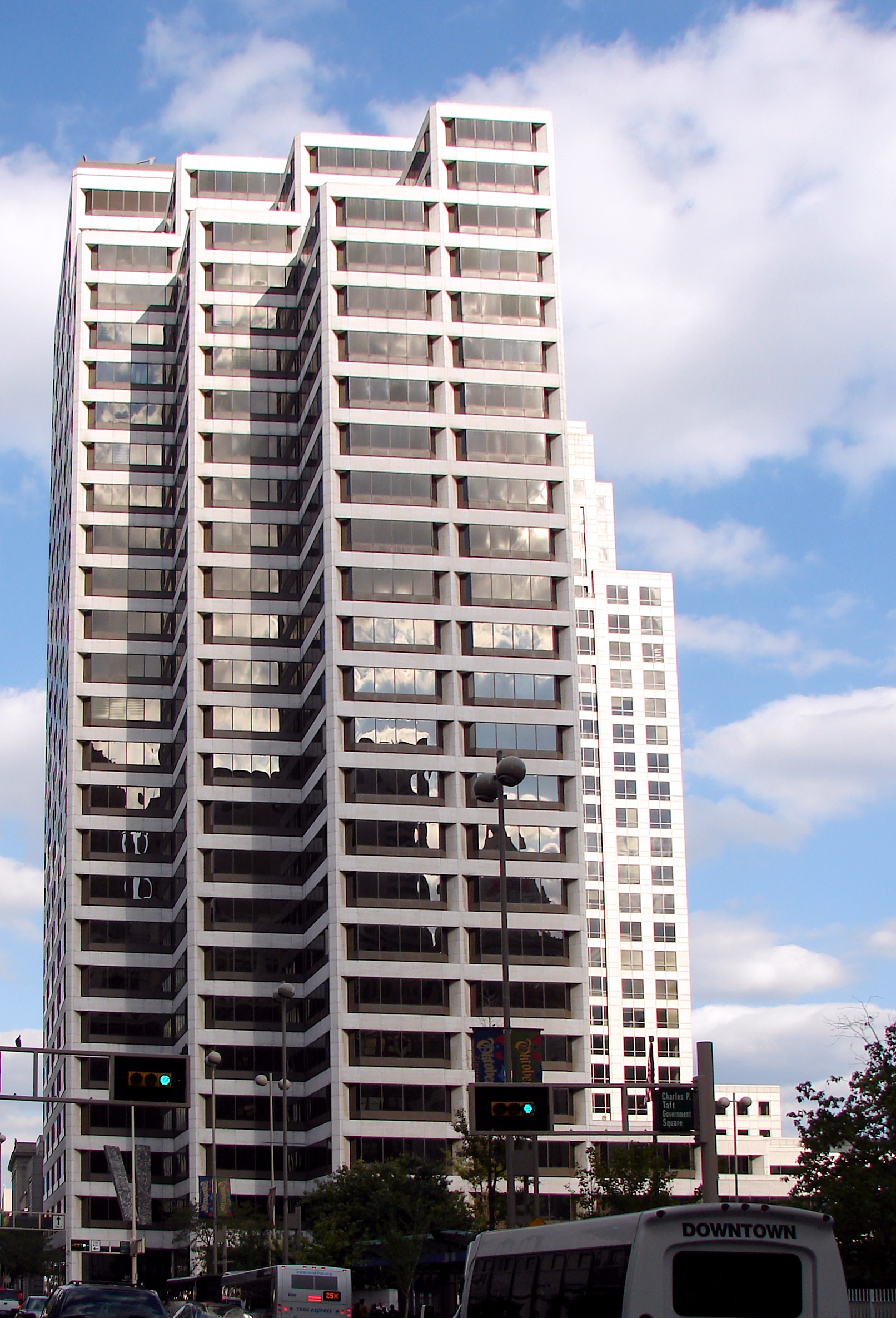
- West side of PNC Center in 2008
- Interactive map of the PNC Center area
- Former names: Central Trust Center

General information
- Type: Office
- Architectural style: Modernist
- Location: 201 East 5th Street; Cincinnati, Ohio
- Coordinates: 39.101338°N 84.509287°W
- Construction started: 1977
- Completed: 1979
- Cost: $36 million ($160 million in 2025)

Height
- Roof: 108 m (354 ft)

Technical details
- Floor count: 27

Design and construction
- Architect: Skidmore, Owings & Merrill
- Developer: Central Bancorporation; Gerald D. Hines Interests
- Main contractor: Dugan & Meyers Construction Co. Inc.

PNC Center is a 27-story, 108-meter (354 feet) modernist office building located at 201 East 5th Street in Cincinnati, Ohio. Located in the city's downtown, the tower was built on behalf of Central Trust Bank and was named Central Trust Center upon its opening in 1979. It was renamed PNC Center after parent company PNC folded Central Trust into the PNC branding in 1992.

== History ==
=== Planning and construction ===
Cincinnati struggled for several years to attract development in "Block E" of its central business district, which was between Fifth, Sycamore, Fourth, and Main Streets. Developers had offered to build high-rise housing on the block, but the city declined these proposals, instead preferring to use the land for offices. IBM considered building an office structure on the block in the 1960s, but was deterred by its proximity to Government Square, as IBM feared that the square's federal government buildings would attract terrorism by political radicals. The city turned its attention to Central Bancorp. Inc. (CBC), which was seeking to expand office space for subsidiary Central Trust Bank, at the time headquartered in Central Trust Tower. The city persuaded CBC to accept Block E as the site of its new offices. Meanwhile, Houston-based developer Gerald D. Hines Interests had failed to win the development rights to a different project known as Fountain Square South, but impressed city officials, who then introduced Hines Interests to Central Trust. The two companies made a formal proposal for the future of Block E in 1975.

On June 16, 1976, land disposition officer Nell Surber of the city's Urban Development Department submitted a proposed contract for the purchase of Block E to the Cincinnati City Council, with Central Trust having announced its intention to acquire the block for a new headquarters shortly beforehand. CBC and Hines Interests submitted a proposal for a new skyscraper on Block E to City Council and the Urban Design Review Board on November 30. Architectural firm Skidmore, Owings & Merrill was hired to design the skyscraper, named Central Trust Center. The 26-story building was projected to include both commercial and office space. Central Trust was slated to occupy about half of the building, and Procter & Gamble (P&G) signed a letter expressing its intent to occupy "a sizable amount" of the building. It was projected to cost $20 million in total, with the city of Cincinnati expected to use parking revenue to fund the tower's $1.5 million, four-story parking garage and a $1 million plaza outside the building. The proposal was unanimously endorsed by the Design Review Board. On December 7, Cincinnati's city manager, William V. Donaldson, encouraged City Council to approve the project. City Council approved the development package by the end of the year.

On February 23, 1977, the developers announced that they would seek state industrial bonds for the parking garage instead of asking the city to fund it. Plans to connect the building to the skywalk system were also canceled. On March 3, City Council approved ordinances that were needed for the project to proceed, including the authorization of $1 million in bonds for the acquisition and clearing of existing properties on the site. By that time, the only such property not already owned by the city was a Greyhound bus station. The city planned to use the bonds to purchase the bus station and then immediately sell it to Central Trust. The city would then purchase the nearby Federal Garage and demolish it to provide temporary quarters for Greyhound until a new, permanent station could open later that year. On March 11, CBC subsidiary Centralbanc Realty Co. purchased Block E from the city for 35% of its market value of over $600,000. Centralbanc paid $10 per square foot for about two-thirds of the block, which had been acquired by the city with federal urban renewal funds. The city paid for the remainder of the land with its own money and subsequently sold it for $20 per square foot to Centralbanc. The disparity between the value of the land and the sale price was covered by tax increment financing. At the time, Central Trust Center was one of only two projects in Ohio to have used such financing since it was legalized in 1968.

By March 24, Dugan & Meyers Construction Co. Inc. had been named the tower's general contractor. Central-Hines, a joint venture between CBC and Hines Interests, opened an office in the Carew Tower by April 27 in order to supervise the development. Under the terms of the joint venture, CBC would own the real estate, while Hines Interests would operate and manage the building. By May 12, the Ohio Development Financing Commission had approved $5 million in bonds for the parking garage. Central Trust acquired a $26 million mortgage from Western & Southern to fund the tower itself. According to Western & Southern president Charles M. Barrett, the loan may have been the largest-ever mortgage between two Cincinnati companies at the time.

Construction of the tower was underway by July 24. CBC president Oliver W. Birckhead attributed the speed at which construction had begun to "a minimum of government red tape". By that time, the building was projected to stand 27 stories tall and cost $36 million. By May 1978, a year before the Center's scheduled opening, the building was already 85% leased. Apart from Central Trust and P&G, "prestige tenants" signing leases included two law firms, accountants Arthur Young & Co., and stock brokers Hutton & Co. In mid-July, a blue spruce tree was placed on the tower to commemorate its topping out.

=== Commercial use ===
The parking garage opened on November 29, 1978, with Central Parking Systems handling operations. Central Trust Center's initial opening party on March 28, 1979 was attended by over 300 prominent businessmen and politicians from Cincinnati, including P&G president John G. Smale and city official Ken Blackwell. The party included an unveiling of an artwork by Ellsworth Kelly that had been commissioned for the building. The artwork, entitled "Cincinnati Spectrum", consisted of 18 panels painted in different colors. At the time, it was Kelly's largest work to date. The artwork elicited mixed responses from attendees. A second party, including a repeat unveiling of "Cincinnati Spectrum", was scheduled to be held the following day. Horror actor Vincent Price was hired to appear in commercials for the building. Upon opening, Central Trust occupied floors 1 through 11 with executive offices on the 26th floor, P&G leased floors 12 through 17, and the remainder were held by various other companies.

In spring 1985, P&G vacated 106,000 square feet in the tower when it moved its employees to a new headquarters. Most of the vacated space was leased by January of the following year, at which time the tower's vacancy rate was 6.1%. In 1986, CBC sold the majority of its interest in the tower to Hines Interests for a profit of $8.3 million. CBC had a 20% share in the joint venture to Hines Interests' 80% as of June 1987, though the former still owned the garage and the underlying land.

By May 1987, CBC and Hines Interests had five years to develop a vacant lot to the east of Central Trust Center until the city could buy back the land. On September 25, the companies unveiled plans for a new skyscraper in the undeveloped area. The 30-story, 500,000-square-foot project was slated to include office space, retail, and an expansion of the existing garage. The project was projected to begin construction in 1988 and cost $50 million. Intended to serve as the "second phase" of Central Trust Center, the tower was initially designated 255 Fifth but opened as the Chemed Center. Central Trust began transferring some of its employees from Central Trust Center to the new building in November 1990.

PNC acquired Central Trust in 1988. By August 1 of that year, Central-Hines had sold a "substantial equity interest" in the tower to a partnership controlled by Aetna for $45.6 million. In 1992, plans for a remodel prevented "Cincinnati Spectrum" from remaining in the Center's lobby, so Central Trust donated it to the Cincinnati Art Museum. On September 17 of that year, PNC announced that five of its subsidiary banks would adopt the PNC name, with Central Trust slated to be renamed the following February. Central Trust Center would likewise be renamed PNC Center.

In December 2001, The Cincinnati Enquirer reported that PNC Center was one of several downtown office towers that had been for sale for months but was struggling to find a buyer amidst poor economic conditions. On March 1, 2002, local media reported that Norfolk, Virginia-based investment firm Harbor Group International had purchased PNC Center for $52.3 million. The seller was an unnamed Dutch pension fund that was advised by UBS Realty Advisors. Harbor Group created CINC Financial Associates to act as the official owner of the Center. At the time, PNC held about half of the space within the building, while other tenants included Robert Half, CB Richard Ellis (CBRE), KPMG, and a law firm. It was the first sale of a major downtown office building since 1999.

Hines purchased PNC Center for $60.8 million in 2005. In 2020, Hines sold the tower to Group RMC Corp. for an undisclosed amount. The sale was marketed by Cushman & Wakefield and CBRE, the latter of which was responsible for leasing arrangements in the building. CBRE was slated to continue handling leasing as well as manage the building following the sale. RMC planned to invest millions of dollars into a renovation of the building. The Center was about 80% occupied at the time of the sale.

== Architecture ==
Standing 27 stories and 108 m (354 ft) tall, PNC Center was the tallest building completed in Cincinnati in the 1970s. The building's exterior is typical of 1970s architecture. It features a lightly colored exterior wall with tinted rectangular windows. Unusual for architecture of the time, there are a number of setbacks in the building, both horizontally and vertically. The building has no crown or topped area which is also typical of 1970s architecture. The roof is flat.

== See also ==
- List of tallest buildings in Cincinnati
