= Cincinnati Skywalk =

Walkway system in Cincinnati, Ohio, United States

Coordinates: 39°6′4″N 84°30′50″W

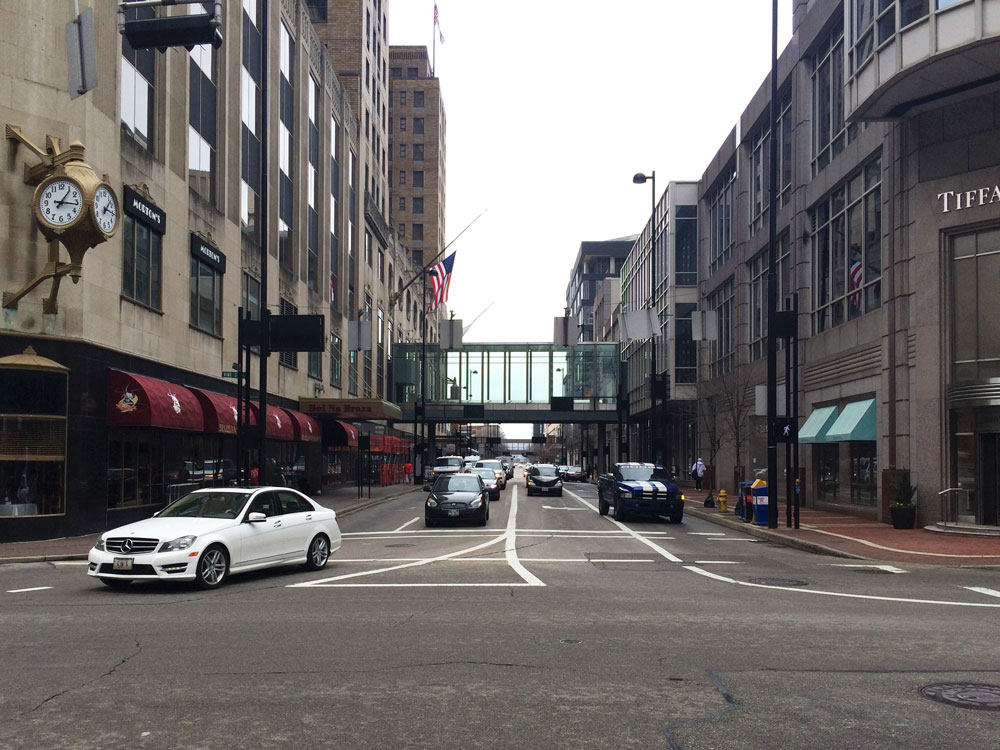
This section of Skywalk crossed 5th Street near Vine Street, connecting Carew Tower with Macy's. It was removed in October 2020.

The Cincinnati Skywalk was a series of walkways, primarily indoors and elevated, that allowed pedestrians to traverse downtown Cincinnati, Ohio, United States.

Built in segments starting in 1971, the 1.3-mile (2.1 km) skywalk was completed in 1997 at a total cost of more than $16 million. Soon afterward, some prominent people of the city began to consider the skywalk as a hindrance to the economic vitality of street-level and sidewalk pedestrian traffic. The skywalk was dismantled in stages beginning 2002 to 2020.

== Creation ==
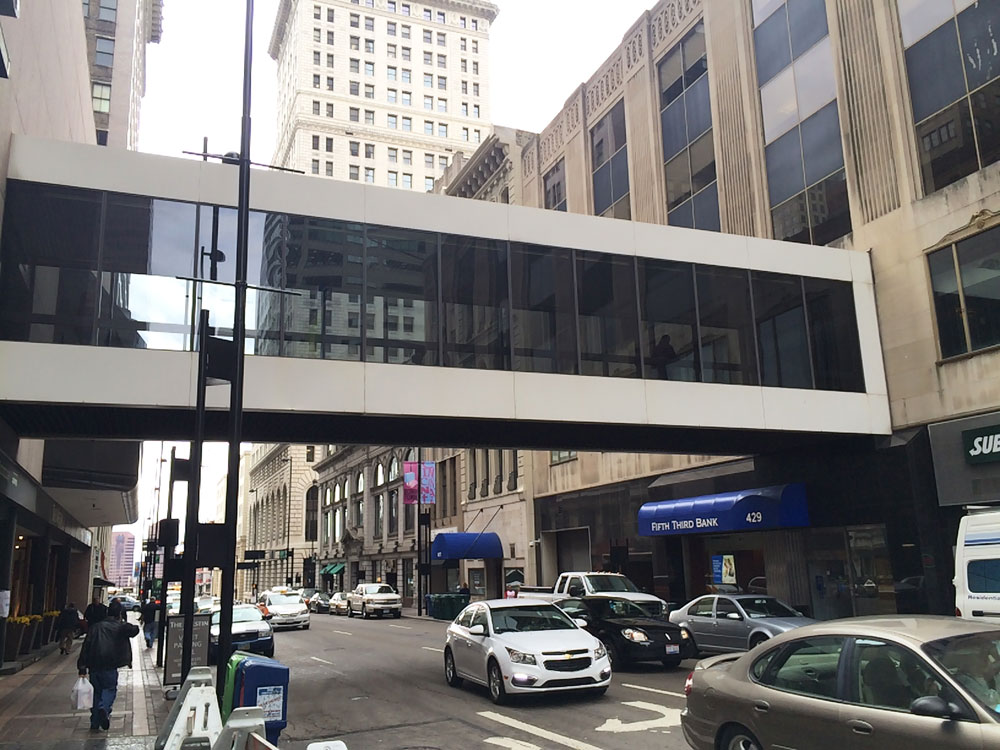
A Skywalk bridge over Vine Street between 4th and 5th Streets connects the Westin hotel complex to the Carew Tower complex.

In 1957, Cincinnati Director of Planning Herbert W. Stevens introduced the idea of "elevated skywalks" as a way to keep pedestrians safe from cars driving through downtown. The concept developed further during the 1960s as part of an urban renewal effort, hoping to make downtown easier for walking and shopping at a time when indoor, climate-controlled suburban shopping malls were becoming very popular.

When the federal government agreed to provide urban renewal funds to help pay for the project, Cincinnati city's council decided to approve the skywalk. The first segment opened in 1971, connecting the Cincinnati Convention Center to Fountain Square. In 1977, the city considered a plan from private developers to construct an automated people mover monorail that would have connected Union Terminal with the skywalk system.

More segments were added through the 1970s, 1980s, and 1990s. It was officially finished in 1997 at a total cost of more than $16 million.

== Changing attitudes ==
Cincinnati's "2002 Center City Plan" emphasized the economic development of the downtown area, and stated the Skywalk allowed pedestrians to bypass the street and caused people to believe downtown was abandoned. The report stated that increasing street-level pedestrian traffic would increase economic activity downtown.

Safety and maintenance were also becoming a growing concern. As the skywalk was built, Cincinnati signed dozens of agreements with private property owners for maintenance, which made it confusing to determine who was responsible for repairs and providing security.

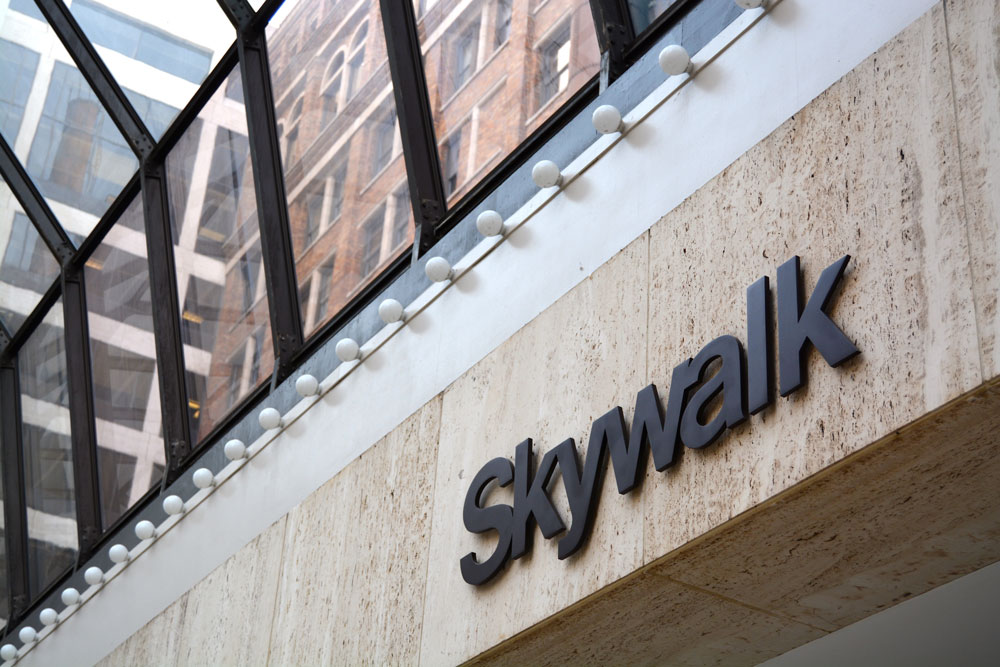
A section of the Cincinnati Skywalk inside the Mercantile Building near E. 4th St. and Main St.

In 2005, then-mayor Charlie Luken told the New York Times the Skywalk is "ugly" and the space underneath is "yucky".

== Removing segments ==
In 2002, five years after it was considered complete, pieces of the skywalk started to be removed. Crews tore out a segment connecting Riverfront Stadium to the Atrium I and II office buildings while configuring Fort Washington Way.

In 2005, as part of the redevelopment of Fountain Square, the city ripped out a segment from the Fifth Third Center to Vine Street and a pedestrian bridge over 5th Street.

In June 2008, a bridge segment over 5th Street between Elm and Race Streets was demolished. When the segment was first built, it connected Saks Fifth Avenue to an office tower on the north side of 5th Street. When the office tower was torn down, the skywalk bridge was no longer needed and removed.

In 2012, the city removed an open-air segment of the skywalk over Elm St. and Rusconi Place.

In January 2013, the bridge segment over Race Street between 5th and 6th Streets was removed. This bridge once connected Macy's to an office building on the west side of Race Street. The office building was demolished but the bridge remained intact for several years. The construction of the new dunnhumby USA office building did not include the use of the skywalk bridge and the bridge was demolished.

In October 2020, perhaps the most recognizable segment of skywalk, over 5th Street, was removed between Race and Vine Streets: the glass-enclosed skywalk connecting Carew Tower to Fountain Place, the former home of Macy's. 3CDC removed this segment of skywalk as part of its Fountain Place redevelopment efforts.

== Map ==
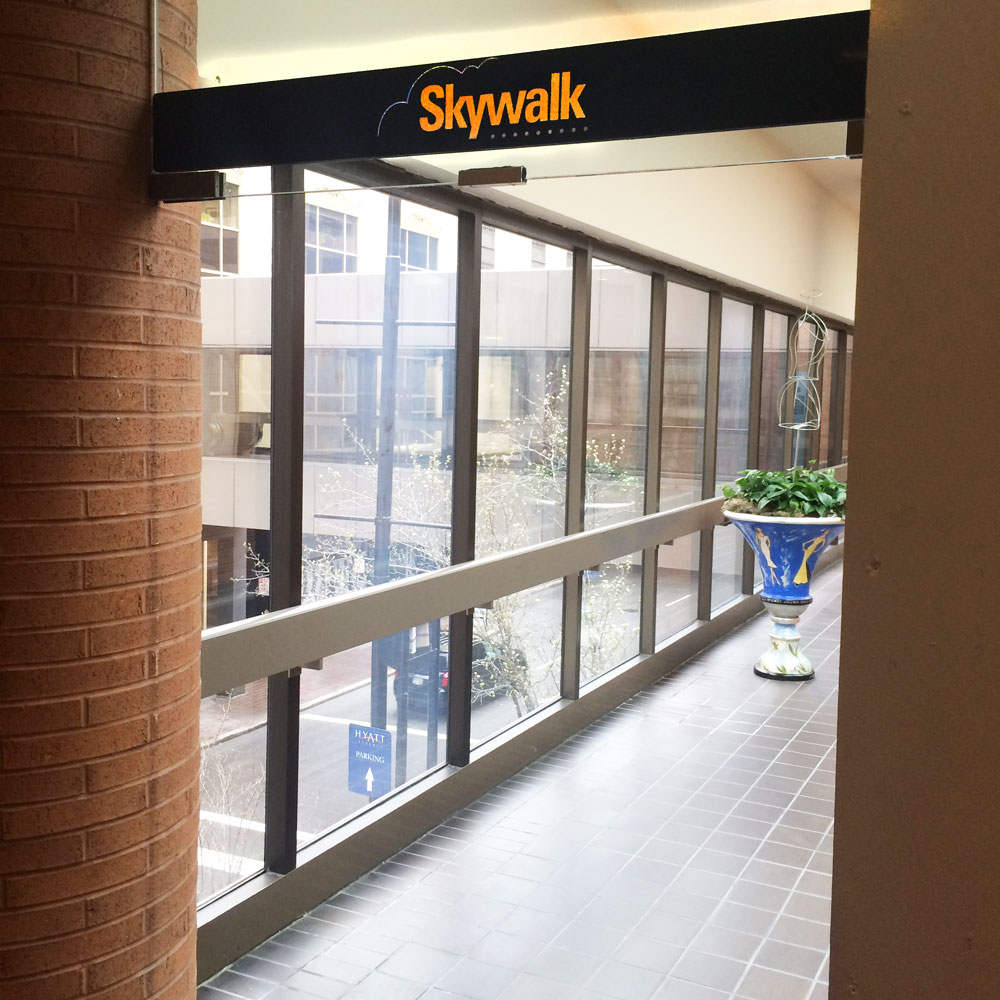
A segment of Skywalk next to Saks Fifth Avenue. The skywalk bridge in the background crosses Race Street near 5th Street.

The Cincinnati Enquirer published a map of the skywalk in 2003, showing the skywalk as a fully connected system that stretched and wended from W. 6th St. near Central Ave., east and south to the area of E. 4th St. near Sycamore.
