= Crosley Tower =

Building in Cincinnati, Ohio

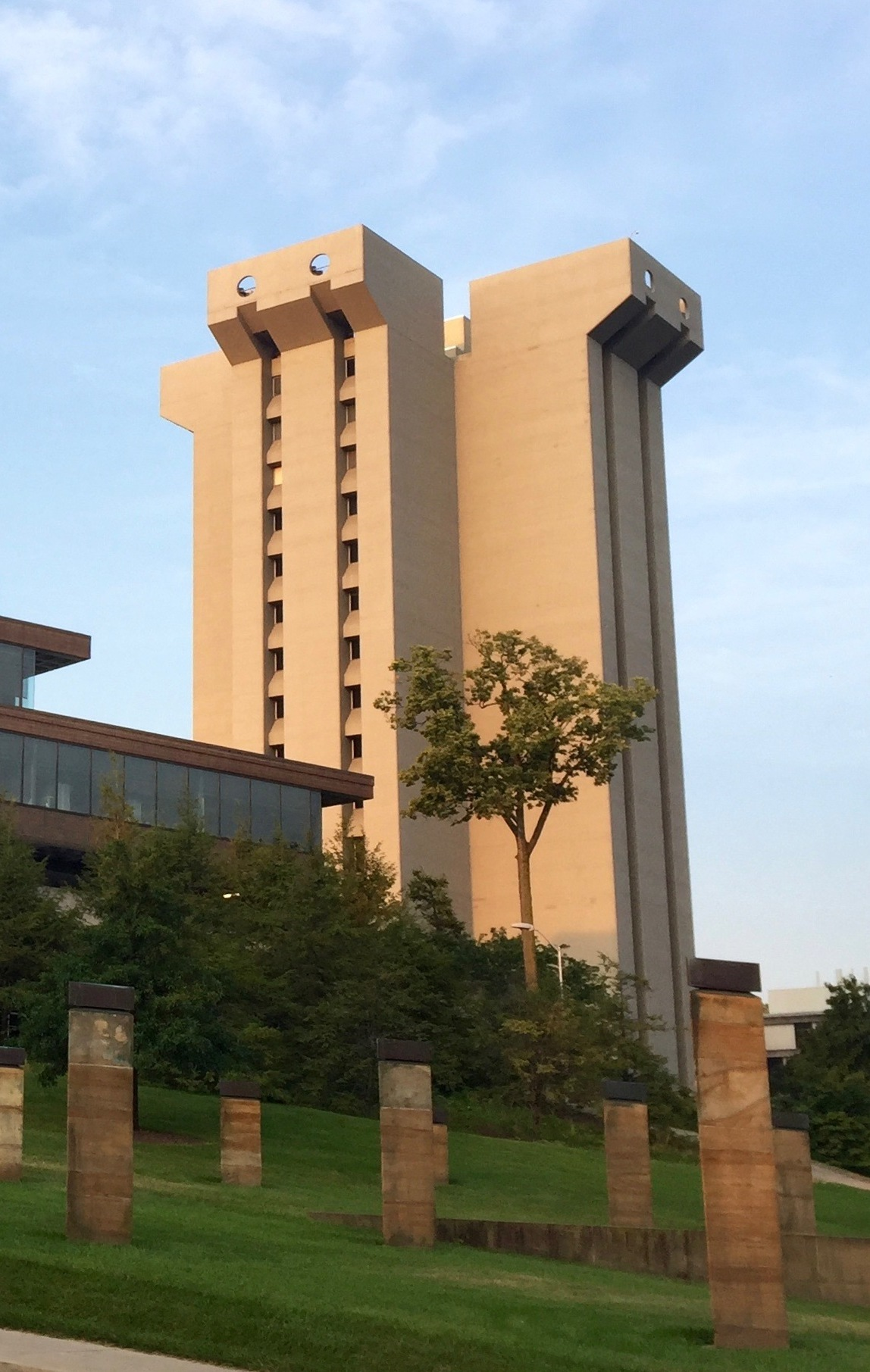
- Crosley Tower in August 2017

General information
- Status: Under demolition
- Architectural style: Brutalist
- Location: 301 Clifton Court, Cincinnati, Ohio
- Coordinates: 39.134550°N 84.516715°W
- Named for: Powel Crosley Jr.
- Completed: 1969
- Demolished: 2026–2027 (est.)
- Cost: $5 million
- Owner: University of Cincinnati

Technical details
- Material: Concrete
- Floor count: 16
- Floor area: 107,253 sq ft (9,964.1 m^{2})

Design and construction
- Architecture firm: A.M. Kinney Associates

Other information
- Public transit: SORTA Metro routes 17, 24, 37, 38, 51

Crosley Tower is a 16-story campus building of the University of Cincinnati in Cincinnati, Ohio. It was designed in the Brutalist style by A.M. Kinney Associates, a Cincinnati architecture firm. As of November 2026, the building is in the process of being demolished.

== Attributes ==
Crosley Tower has 107,253 sq ft (9,964.1 m^{2}) between 16 stories. The tower, along with its counterpart Rieveschl Hall, has massive concrete columns that flare at the top. It is roughly square, and resembles an abstract fluted Corinthian column. The tower is a symbol of the university, and a visual landmark, visible from most areas on the campus and beyond.

The tower is the second largest continuous pour concrete structure in the United States, behind the Hoover Dam.

== History ==
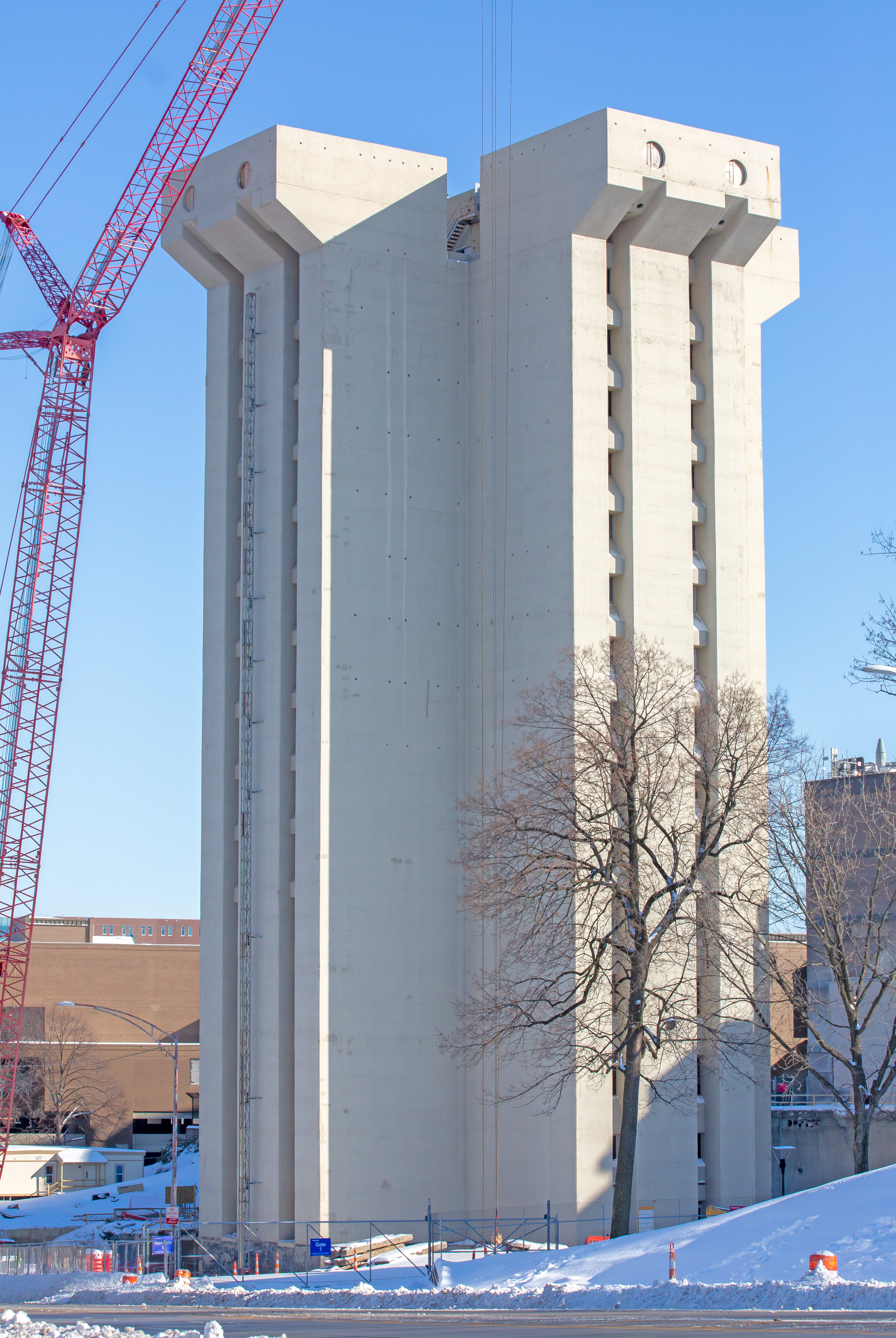
Crosley Tower on January 26, 2026, the day before demolition began.

The tower was completed in 1969 for $5 million. It was named after University of Cincinnati alumnus Powel Crosley Jr.

In 2017, the building was featured at the top of a list of America's ugliest university buildings, as compiled by Architectural Digest. In 2020, Cincinnati Magazine included it in a list of iconic Cincinnati architecture that defines the city.

In 2018, university officials announced the building's planned demolition. The structure has not been well maintained, with problems including crumbling exterior concrete, a sinking foundation, and leaking ceilings. The officials also described that the building does not function well for the university, and that renovations would be difficult due to its thick, seamless concrete walls. Its chemistry and biology labs must be relocated off-site before the demolition can take place. In 2020, the college set 2025 as the soonest date for demolition, pending construction of Clifton Court Hall and renovation of the Old Chemistry Building. An official plan for the demolition and replacement of Crosley Tower was revealed in 2023, with $47.3 million approved by the UC Board of Trustees on April 22, 2025 to fund its remediation and demolition.

Deconstruction was scheduled to begin on January 27, 2026, following a brief weather delay. Skanska is leading the project, utilizing a top-down, floor-by-floor removal process. The demolition and site remediation is projected to cost approximately $47 million and conclude by February 2027. The university plans to replace the tower with a $215 million, 200,000 sq ft (19,000 m^{2}) STEM education facility.

In 2021, the student organization "Crosley Tower Appreciation Club" was started at the University of Cincinnati. Some society activities include photography competitions and watching movies projected against the building's side. By 2026, the club had grown to over 500 members, with fans creating custom fonts inspired by the building's aesthetics to commemorate the "bold and unapologetic" structure.

== Legacy ==
In April 2026, an independent video game titled The Crosley Tower Horror was released on Steam by developer ithinknotm8!. Developed as a digital tribute to the building during its demolition phase, the first-person puzzle-horror game requires the player to navigate a recreation of the tower's abandoned 1969-era laboratories The gameplay heavily incorporates the building's real-life structural issues, and airborne asbestos acts as an environmental hazard.
