= Fifth Third Center (Cincinnati) =

Skyscraper located in downtown Cincinnati

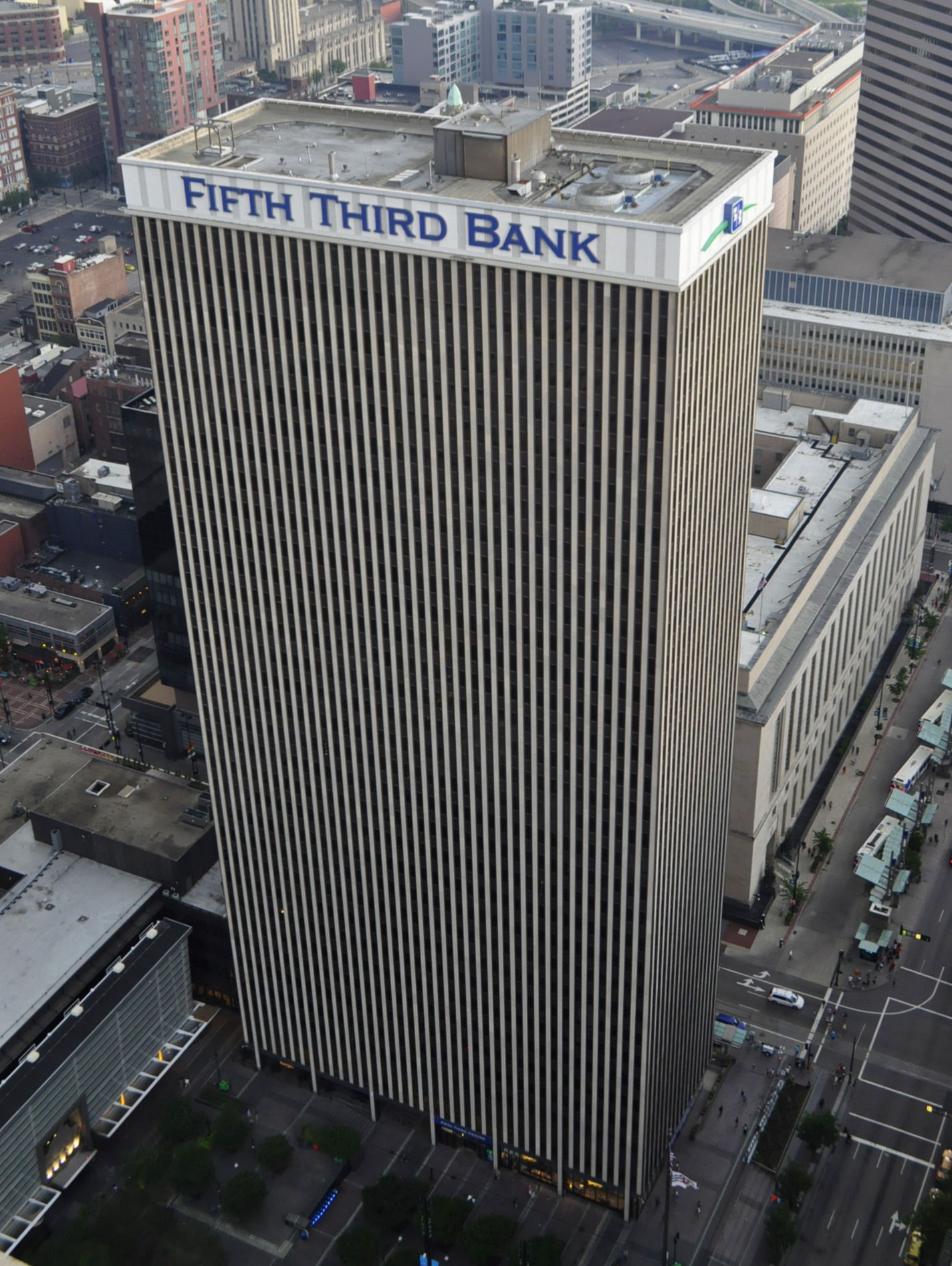
- Fifth Third Center in 2018

General information
- Type: Commercial offices
- Architectural style: International Style
- Location: 511 Walnut Street; Cincinnati, Ohio, U.S.
- Coordinates: 39.1019°N 84.511828°W
- Construction started: 1967
- Completed: 1969
- Owner: Fifth Third Bancorp

Height
- Roof: 129 m (423 ft)

Technical details
- Floor count: 32
- Lifts/elevators: 12

Design and construction
- Architect: Harrison & Abramovitz
- Developer: Cincinnati Redevelopment Corporation; Fifth Third Bank
- Main contractor: Turner Construction Co.

Fifth Third Center is an International Style office skyscraper in downtown Cincinnati, Ohio. The 32-story building rises to a height of 423 feet (129 m), making it the fifth-tallest building in the city. Developed by the Cincinnati Redevelopment Corporation and Fifth Third Bank and designed by Harrison & Abramovitz, the tower was built as part of a major remodel of Cincinnati's Fountain Square. Known as Cincinnati Center early in its development, it opened as DuBois Tower in 1969. The building serves as Fifth Third's corporate headquarters.

== History ==
=== Planning and construction ===
On July 13, 1966, the Cincinnati Redevelopment Corporation (CRC) and Fifth Third Bank announced plans for a remodel of "Block A" of downtown Cincinnati, which was "long considered the key" to downtown's urban renewal. The plan was centered around a revamped Fountain Square plaza, which was to be situated above a 600-spot parking garage at Fifth and Vine Streets. The plaza was slated to feature a 32-story skyscraper, named "Cincinnati Center", at the northwest corner of Fifth and Walnut Streets. 30 floors were to be dedicated mostly to office space for Fifth Third and other tenants, with two mechanical floors at the peak and restaurants at the ground level and top of the tower. A five-story building, featuring ground-level retail, space for Fifth Third, and 450 parking spaces, was to be built at the south side of Sixth Street between Walnut and Vine Streets. Baltimore firm Rogers, Taliaferro, Kostritsky, and Lamb, which had designed the overall plan for downtown, was hired to design the plaza itself. New York City-based Harrison & Abramovitz was to plan the office tower, with Cincinnati firm Hake & Hake designing the smaller bank building. The project was expected to cost $30 million ($298 million in 2025), of which $20 million ($198 million in 2025) would be spent on the tower. Groundbreaking was slated to begin in the fall of that year after the demolition of the Fountain Square Building and other structures along Sixth Street, and the tower was scheduled for completion in 1968.

On December 13, city officials stated that CRC would move forward with the $2 million ($19.8 million in 2025) purchase of Block A, with a closing date set for January 27, 1967. The city stated that the new development would generate $90,000 ($893,077 in 2025) in tax revenue per year, which would pay off the $1.5 million ($14.9 million in 2025) that the city had spent to acquire and clear the land within 15 years. The remaining $6 million ($59.5 million in 2025) for the land had come from the federal government. On April 13, Fifth Third formally signed a lease to 130,000 square feet on the second through fifth floors of the Center as well as the second through fourth floors and the penthouse of the adjacent structure. The Connecticut General Life Insurance Company of Hartford, Connecticut provided the development with $20 million in long-term capital financing. Cincinnati-based Turner Construction Co. was hired as the project's primary contractor.

The Center's groundbreaking ceremony occurred on April 22 amidst the "Area on the Move" parade. Actual construction was scheduled to begin on April 24. The first concrete for the building's foundation was poured on August 25. On August 29, officials from the Departments of Housing and Urban Development (HUD) and Labor met with Turner and over 20 subcontractors and informed them that they "must offer equal job opportunities to Negroes" or else work on the project could be halted. The contractors were required to provide HUD with a written affirmative action program as well as updates on the number of black employees in each profession. No specific goal was given for the number of black employees that should be hired, but a HUD official stated that "tokenism" should be avoided.

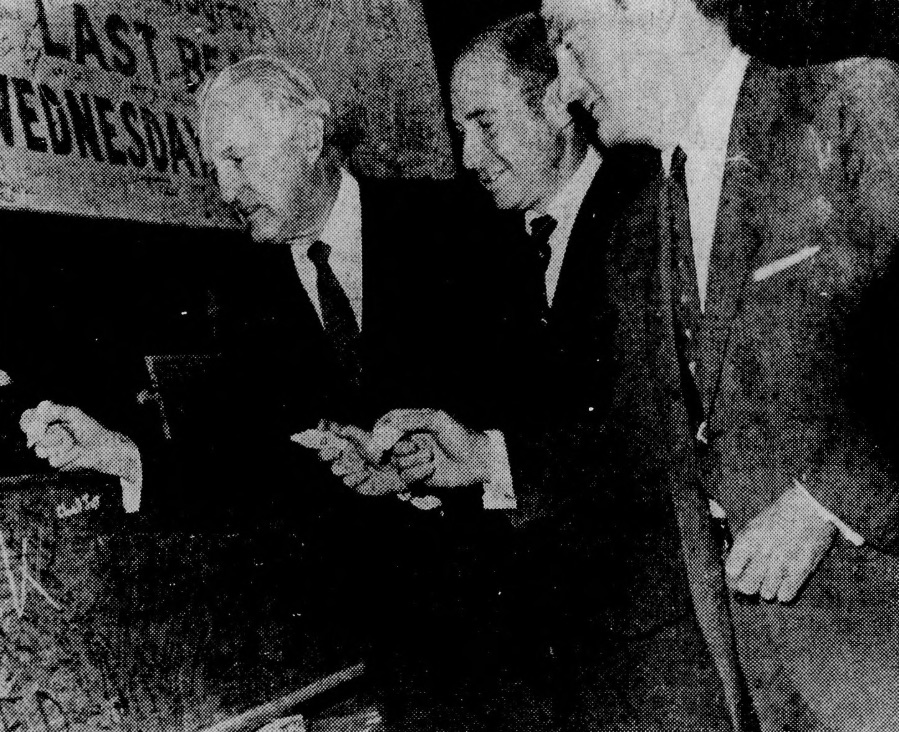
Cincinnati Redevelopment Corporation executives sign the last beam of the tower before its topping out on September 25, 1968

On April 1, 1968, members of Operating Engineers Local 18 began a walkout strike after ironworkers were allowed to operate a derrick, which the engineers claimed as their own responsibility. The engineers returned to work on April 5 pending arbitration. Over 6000 workers from multiple unions went on strike on June 1 after their contracts expired, affecting the Cincinnati Center and several other large projects in the city. On July 3, some ironworkers returned to work, but other professions continued to strike. Upon winning a raise, carpenters returned to the project on August 26, 86 days after the strike began. The tower topped out on September 25. On October 10, CRC's president announced that the five-story building and the 32-story tower would collectively be renamed "Fifth Third Center", while the taller of the two structures would individually be known as "DuBois Tower" in honor of the DuBois Chemical Co., which intended to make the skyscraper its headquarters. On December 28, strong winter winds helped start a fire on the 29th floor of the building, which was extinguished by firefighters after causing about $750 in damage.

On February 14, 1969, members of a laborers' union walked out of the project due to a dispute with carpenters, leading Turner to file an unfair labor practice complaint against the union with the National Labor Relations Board on February 18. On March 5, judge Timothy Hogan issued a temporary restraining order against the union, ending the strike. By September 26, the tower was ready for operations for some tenants, but full completion of the tower was delayed due to a glazier's strike in St. Louis that halted the delivery of glass windows and doors.

=== Commercial use ===
DuBois Tower opened to tenants on September 26, 1969, with accounting firm Ernst and Ernst slated to become the first occupant when it moved to its offices on the 14th floor that day. Turner, which had built the tower, intended to move into it shortly after its opening. Fifth Third was scheduled to move into the building on December 15, departing its former headquarters. Namesake DuBois Chemicals was slated to begin its move to the tower on March 20, 1970.

On October 30, 1981, California-based investment firm RREEF agreed to purchase DuBois Tower from CRC for $20 million ($70.8 million in 2025). Both Fifth Third and the tower's mortgage-holder, Connecticut General Life Insurance, had the right of first refusal for any third-party sales; Fifth Third made no response to the sale, but Connecticut General objected. On November 24, Connecticut General announced that it would be exercising its option to purchase the tower. By December 15, RREEF had filed a lawsuit to stop Connecticut General's purchase. RREEF argued that the building's deed gave Connecticut General only 15 days after being notified of a third-party sale to decide whether or not buy the building. As the insurance company was informed of the sale on November 4, the suit stated that any decision to exercise its option after November 19 was invalid. While acknowledging that the purchase agreement with CRC gave Connecticut General three weeks to respond, RREEF's suit alleged that CRC violated the deed by including this stipulation in the sale.

On March 11, 1982, judge Carl B. Rubin ruled against RREEF, stating that the October purchase agreement had legitimately extended Connecticut General's ability to counter the sale. Connecticut General purchased the tower for $33,150,000 ($117 million in 2025) in June. The following year, Fifth Third decided to exercise its own right of refusal to acquire the building. By August 18, 1983, a joint venture of Fifth Third, Western & Southern, and the John W. Galbreath Co. of CRC had purchased the tower for $32,745,000 ($106 million in 2025). DuBois Tower and the adjacent bank building were 99% occupied at the time of the sale.

In 1988, DuBois Tower adopted the Fifth Third Center name. Fifth Third's property management division, Fountain Square Management, took control of the building's leasing from Galbreath in January 1990. By that time, up to 25% of the tower was set to be vacated after several tenants agreed to move to other skyscrapers. By April 6, 1996, Fifth Third was installing "Fifth Third Bank" signage on the west and east sides of the tower. In 2001, Fifth Third moved about 2200 employees from the Center to a different office in the Madisonville neighborhood, leaving roughly 2500 employees at the Center.

In 2007, Fifth Third changed its logo from a black-red-white color scheme to a blue-green-white one, beginning a series of signage changes at Fifth Third's various properties. The update to Fifth Third Center's signage began in May 2011 and was scheduled for completion by October 1 of that year. By October 19, 2017, Fifth Third was installing new signage to enable both the letters and the background to change color. During the day, the signage would typically feature blue letters against a white background, while at night, the letters would be white against a variety of colors. The installation was projected to finish by the end of the year.

On September 6, 2018, the building was the site of a mass shooting, in which four people were killed, including the suspect. Two others were also injured in the shooting.

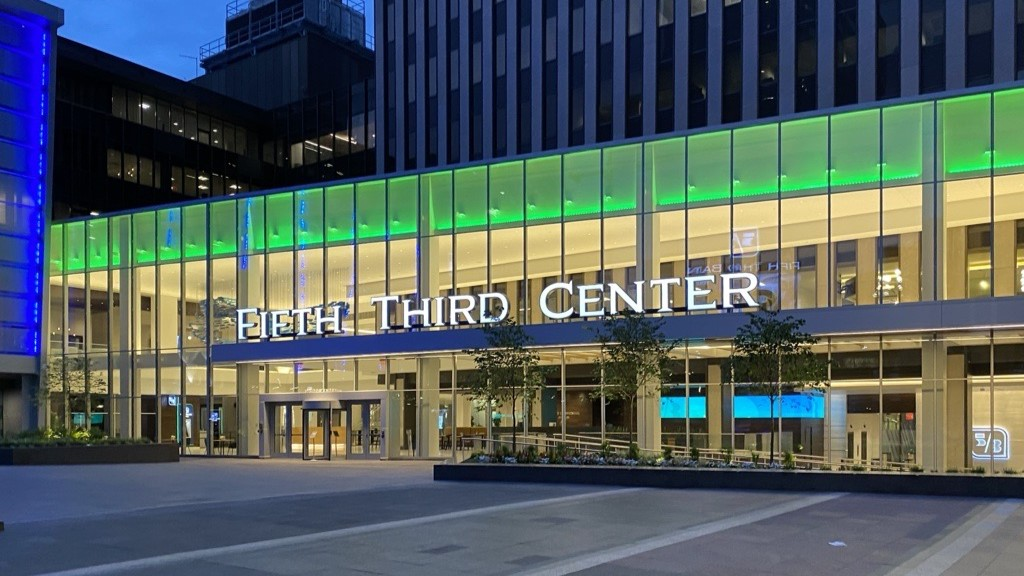
The 2021 lobby

By 2018, Fifth Third was planning a major remodel of the Center's lobby. The plan was named "Project Connect", as it would directly connect the tower with the complex's smaller building. Completed by early June 2021 after about two years of construction, the two-story lobby featured an atrium, named Greg D. Carmichael Atrium after Fifth Third's CEO; a 300-person convention space on the second floor; and a "next-generation" bank branch, which had opened in 2020. While much of the lobby was publicly accessible, the 2018 shooting lead to increased security measures, such as armed guards. The lobby was designed by BHDP and built by Messer Construction Co., both of Cincinnati.

In 2024, the bank decided to move 350 employees from Madisonville to the Center, bringing the Center's Fifth Third workforce to about 2400 people. In April 2026, the bank announced that it would close its Madisonville office and split its 750 employees between the Fifth Third Center and Columbia Plaza downtown, which was "a result of Fifth Third’s belief that bringing people together strengthens its culture and supports the city and its vital urban core".

== Architecture ==
Fifth Third Center is an example of International Style architecture. Its facade was originally intended to feature a "curtain wall of dark glass". The tower's architectural firm, Harrison & Abramovitz, had a history of glass curtain wall designs, such as the United Nations Secretariat Building. Harrison & Abramovitz architect Walter C. Colvin stated that "we more or less came back to the idea that a tall building gives more of a sense of permanence if it has some masonry in it". The incorporation of masonry was also intended to help the building better resemble nearby structures. The final design thus featured alternating, vertically-oriented panels of limestone and bronze-tinted glass.

== Reception ==
Writing for The Cincinnati Enquirer in October 1969, George Palmer was negative towards the design of the tower. Criticizing the redesigned Fountain Square for having "shapeless austerity instead of charm", Palmer referred to the building as a "glass box" that "shoot[s] into the sky like a blunt rivet". While stating that he was confident the building was "functional", he "looked up to [the tower], and saw the magnified eyes of a fly — hundreds of prisms looking back at [him] but saying very little". Luke Peck, writing for the Enquirer that same month, praised the contrast of the "classic" Tyler Davidson Fountain on Fountain Square and the "contemporary" skyscraper's "almost Spartan straightness".

Writing for the Enquirer in April 1974, art history instructor Jayne Merkel of the Art Academy of Cincinnati described the tower as a "typical though by no means outstanding example of mid-century skyscraper design". She disapproved of the "repetitious", vertical-oriented exterior facade's concealment of the structural steel framework and the horizontal slabs that divided each floor, stating that the exterior "pleases but teases". A 1976 article in The Cincinnati Post stated that the tower, despite the acclaim of the architectural firm behind it, "turned out to be notably pedestrian, in the opinion of most informed critics of architecture heareabouts". In 1998, University of Cincinnati architecture professor Dennis Mann stated that the Center was a "big, dull, boring building from the 60s", which Enquirer writer Cliff Radel labeled a "charitabl[e]" description.

== See also ==
- List of tallest buildings in Cincinnati
