= Starrett =

Starrett is a surname. Notable people with the surname include:

- Charles Starrett (1903–1986), American actor
- Helen Ekin Starrett (1840–1920), American educator, author, suffragette
- Jack Starrett (1936–1989), American actor and film director
- Keith Starrett (born 1951), United States federal judge
- Laroy S. Starrett (1836–1922), businessman and inventor
- Paul Starrett (1866–1957), American builder
- Priscilla Hollister Starrett (1929–1997), American herpetologist
- Vincent Starrett (1886–1974), American writer and newspaperman
- William A. Starrett (1877–1932), America builder of skyscrapers, built the Empire State Building

== See also ==
- L. S. Starrett Company, American manufacturer of tools and instruments
- Starrett & van Vleck specialized in the design of early 20th century department stores primarily in New York City
- Starrett City, Brooklyn, housing development in Brooklyn, New York City
- Starrett City Associates, group of investors that built and owned the Starrett City housing complex
- Starrett Corporation, general investment company which incorporated in Dover, Delaware, in February 1929; constructors of the Empire State Building and several housing complexes, including Starrett City, in New York City
- Starrett-Lehigh Building a full-block freight terminal, warehouse and office building in the Chelsea neighborhood of Manhattan, New York City
