= Carew Tower =

49-story Art Deco building in Cincinnati, US

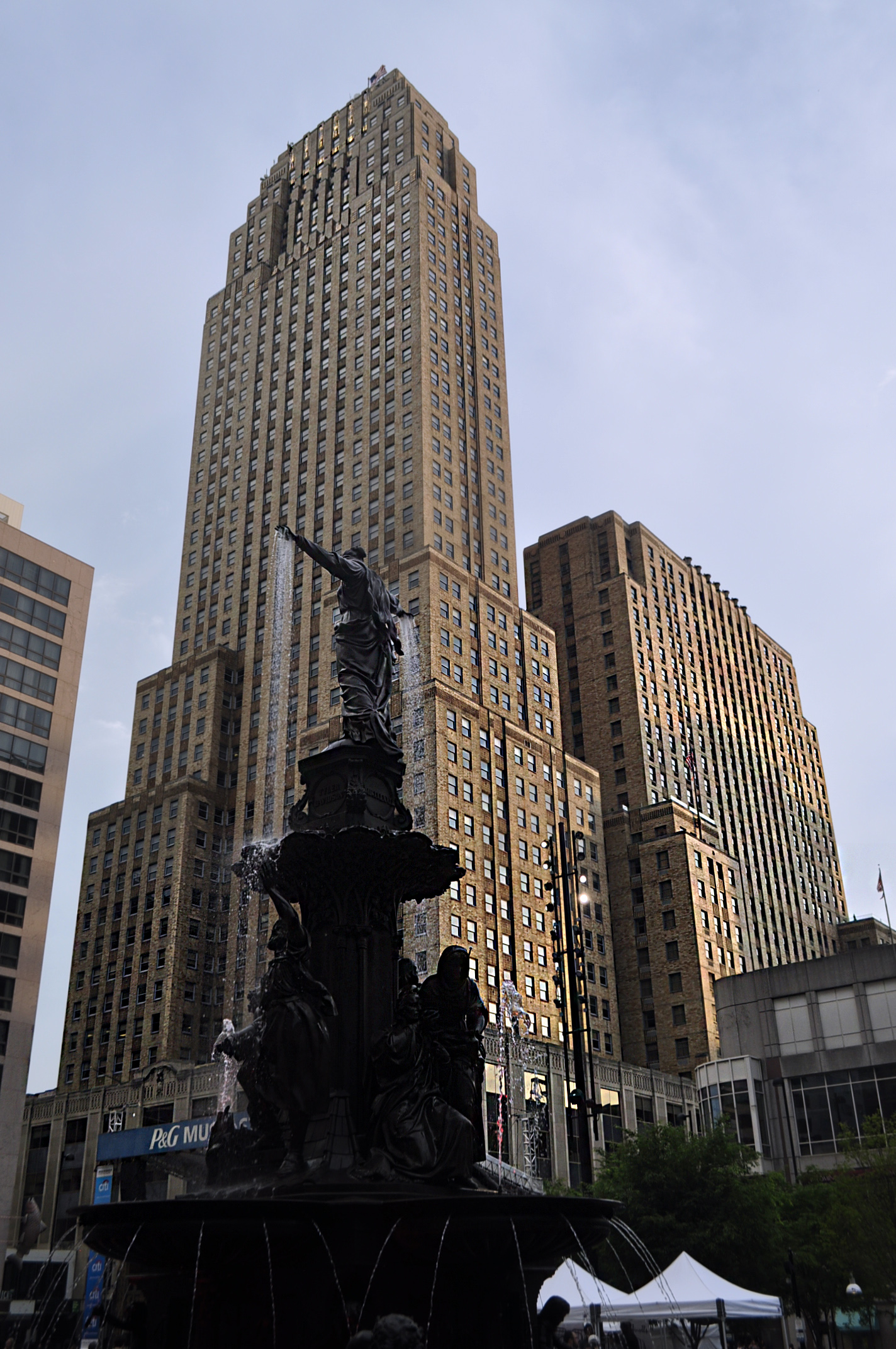
- Carew Tower (left) and Netherland Plaza (right) as seen from Fountain Square, with The Genius of Water in the foreground

- Location within Ohio

Record height
- Tallest in Cincinnati from 1931 to 2011^{[I]}
- Preceded by: Fourth and Vine Tower
- Surpassed by: Great American Tower at Queen City Square

General information
- Status: Completed
- Type: Commercial offices
- Architectural style: Art Deco
- Location: 441 Vine Street; Cincinnati, Ohio
- Coordinates: 39.1007°N 84.5132°W
- Construction started: 1929
- Completed: 1931
- Cost: $33 million ($636 million in 2025)
- Owner: Victrix Investments, LLC

Height
- Antenna spire: 190 m (623 ft)
- Roof: 175 m (574 ft)
- Top floor: 171.3 m (562 ft)

Technical details
- Floor count: 49
- Floor area: 128,000 m^{2} (1,377,780.5 sq ft)
- Lifts/elevators: 14

Design and construction
- Architects: Walter W. Ahlschlager; Delano & Aldrich
- Developer: John J. Emery
- Main contractor: William A. Starrett (Starrett Brothers, Inc.)
- Carew Tower-Netherland Plaza Hotel
- U.S. National Register of Historic Places
- U.S. National Historic Landmark
- Area: 10 acres (4.0 ha)
- NRHP reference No.: 82003578

Significant dates
- Added to NRHP: August 5, 1982
- Designated NHL: April 19, 1994

Carew Tower is a 49-story, 574-foot (175 m) Art Deco skyscraper in downtown Cincinnati, Ohio. The second-tallest building in the city, it was Cincinnati's tallest from 1930 until 2011, when it was surpassed by Great American Tower at Queen City Square. The tower is named after Mabley & Carew department store proprietor Joseph T. Carew, who was the namesake of a previous structure on the site.

The Carew Tower was developed by industrialist John J. Emery, who sought to create a mixed-use "city within a city" with an office and retail tower, a hotel, and a parking garage. Planning was assisted by skyscraper pioneer William A. Starrett, whose firm Starrett Brothers, Inc. became the project's contractor. Walter W. Ahlschlager served as the complex's principal architect, with Delano & Aldrich as an associate architect. Announced shortly before the onset of the Great Depression in 1929, work on the project continued despite poor economic conditions. The office and retail tower topped out in July 1930, and the entire complex was complete by early 1931 at a cost of $33 million ($636 million in 2025).

Upon its completion in 1930, the tallest of the complex's three towers housed commercial offices on the majority of floors, a retail arcade on the lower levels, and an observation deck on the top floor. In its later years as a commercial property, the tower was beset by high vacancy rates and financial difficulties. In 2022, the tower was purchased by developer Victrix Investments LLC, which announced plans to convert it into a primarily residential building by late 2029. The complex's hotel opened as the St. Nicholas Plaza in 1931, but has operated under a variation of the name Netherland Plaza for most of its history, becoming the Hilton Cincinnati Netherland Plaza in 2002. Previously under common ownership with the rest of the complex, the hotel was excluded from the 2022 sale. The parking garage, which was the shortest tower, closed in 1979 and was subsequently demolished.

Celebrated by local media and public figures within Cincinnati, the Carew Tower is among the city's foremost landmarks. It was added to the National Register of Historic Places in 1982 and was designated a National Historic Landmark in 1994, with the National Park Service describing it as "one of the finest examples of skyscraper modernism in America" and "the most complete statement of the 1920s' Jazz Age".

== History ==
=== Planning and construction ===
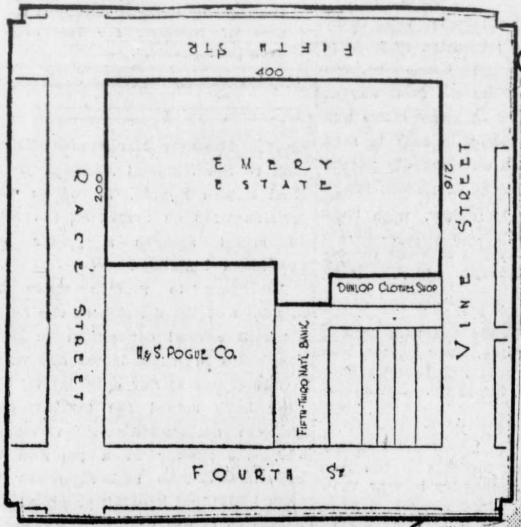
August 1929 map of the plot of land, labeled "Emery estate", that would later host the Carew Tower

The Carew Tower replaced the 1891 Carew Building, a nine-story structure designed by James W. McLaughlin in the Romanesque style. The Carew Building was named after Joseph T. Carew, founder of the Mabley & Carew department store. The Emery Hotel & Arcade, established by industrialist Thomas Emery in 1877, was located nearby. Thomas Emery's widow, Mary Emery, purchased the Carew Building in May 1925 for $2,000,000 ($36.7 million in 2025). At the time, The Cincinnati Post reported that Mary Emery was considering building a new hotel on the site as a memorial to her deceased husband. The following month, a court permitted the Emerys to place many of their properties under the management of realty firm Thomas Emery's Sons, Inc. By the end of the year, the Andrews Building was the only structure on the eventual site of the Carew Tower to be outside of Emery ownership. On March 22, 1929, Thomas Emery's Sons purchased the Andrews Building for $1,000,000 ($18.8 million in 2025), giving it control of a contiguous plot of land on the southern portion of Fifth Street between Race and Vine Streets. On March 30, tenants in most of the existing buildings on the plot were told to vacate by June 1 ahead of a new construction project. The Emery Hotel closed on June 3 in preparation for the project.

This project, which would become the Carew Tower, was conceived by realtor Walter S. Schmidt of the Frederick A. Schmidt Company. John J. Emery, vice president of Thomas Emery's Sons, served as the project's developer. Early plans called for a mixed-use "city within a city", featuring a department store, a theater, office space, and a hotel to rival the Waldorf-Astoria. Schmidt and Emery negotiated a deal with skyscraper pioneer William A. Starrett, who subsequently assumed control of the tower's planning. Starrett's firm Starrett Brothers, Inc. became the project's general contractor. By the mid-summer of 1929, the theater had been removed from the plan, while a retail arcade and an automated parking garage had been added. Starrett Brothers hired Walter W. Ahlschlager as the project's principal architect, while Emery preferred Delano & Aldrich, which had previously built a house for Emery in Indian Hill. Delano & Aldrich was subsequently hired as an associate architect. Ahlschlager's design was heavily influenced by the Crane Tower, an unrealized skyscraper in Chicago that he had previously designed. Many of his proposals did not make it into the final design, which was prepared by Delano & Aldrich and influenced by its earlier Wall and Hanover Building.

The project was announced on August 24, 1929. The first structure on the site to begin demolition was the Emery Hotel, with wrecking efforts starting on August 25. A crew of 700 men demolished the Carew Building over the course of 30 days, with 400 working during the day and 300 working at night. The Carew Building was the tallest structure in the city to have been demolished up to that point. On September 9, the vice president of the wrecking company announced that his employees would begin digging the building's foundation in 10 days. By mid-October, the Marks Building was the last of the 13 structures on the site still standing. The entire demolition project, which was the largest in Cincinnati history at the time, was completed after 51 working days.

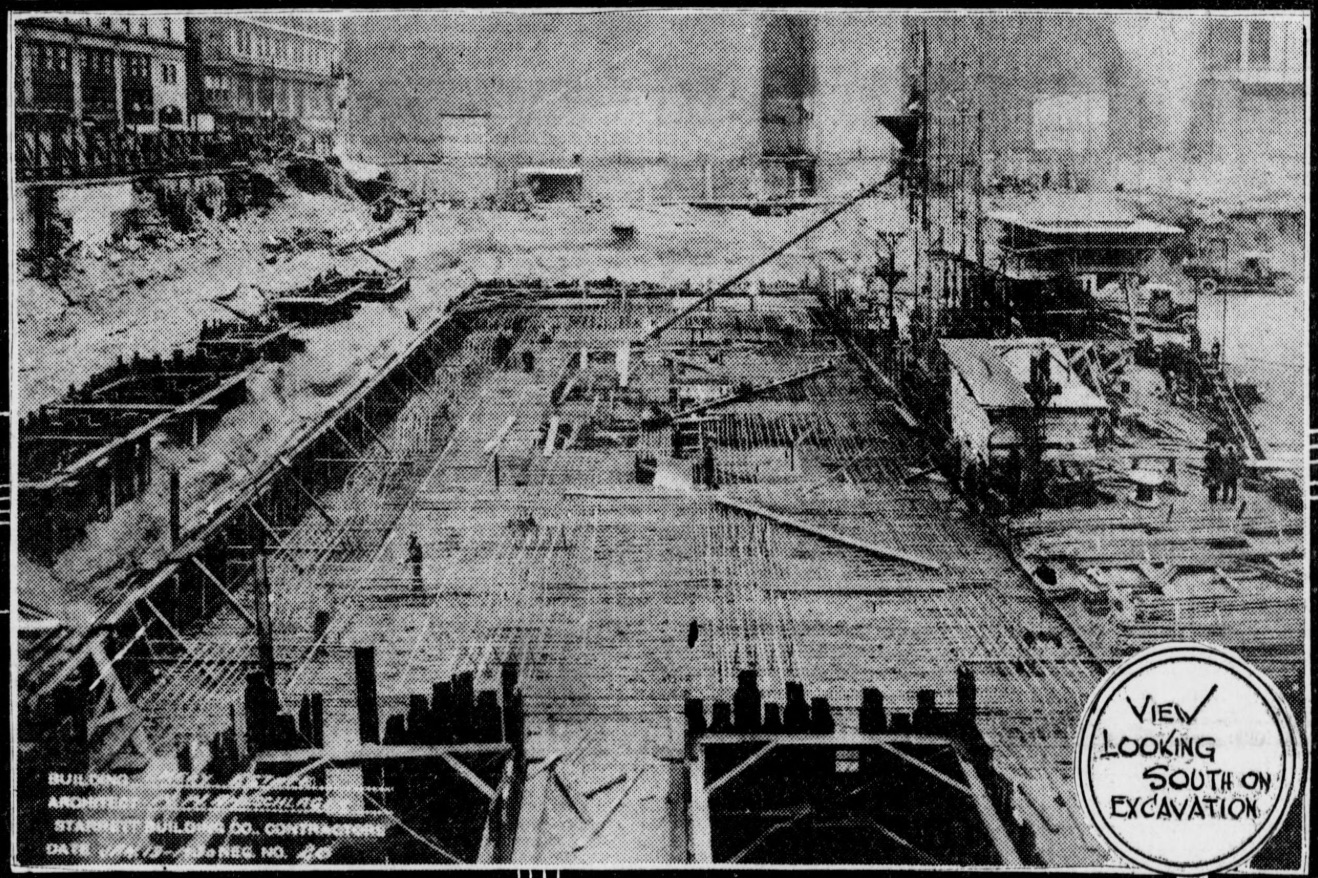
"View looking south on excavation", January 1930

Work on the project began shortly before the stock market crash on October 24 that triggered the Great Depression. Emery had sold his stocks weeks beforehand in order to finance the building, which reduced the crash's impact on the project. Construction continued on a modified plan. In November, a Starrett executive denied rumors that the project had been canceled or downsized, instead announcing that the project would be increased in size as a reflection of the Starretts' "belief in the marvelous future that lies ahead of Cincinnati". The first concrete was poured on January 8, 1930. 400 workers helped pour the base of the structure, finishing after 30 hours of continuous work. Underpinning of adjacent structures was completed by January 25, by which time excavation was projected to conclude before February 15. Steel construction was scheduled to begin on February 10. "Carew Tower" was announced as the building's official name on March 1, honoring Joseph T. Carew. Starrett Brothers set a goal to raise the steel framework in under 50 days, with the first steel raised on March 6.

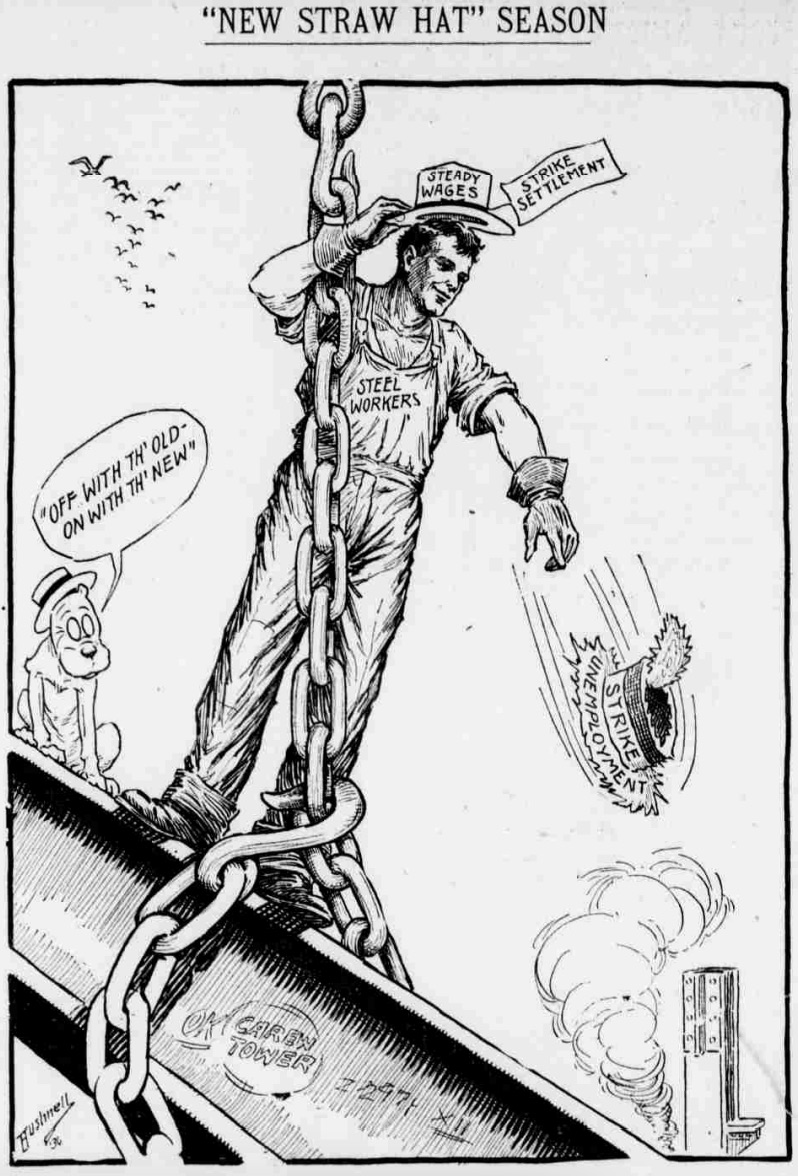
E. A. Bushnell cartoon celebrating the end of the strike

Workers laid steel for the first three floors until March 24, when the International Association of Iron Workers began a sympathy strike in response to Starrett Brothers' use of non-union workers for the construction of the Empire State Building in New York City. 259 iron and steel workers temporarily left the project due to the strike, though workers in other professions continued to operate. In April, Northwestern Mutual took out a $12 million ($231 million in 2025) mortgage on the tower, which was the largest mortgage ever taken in Cincinnati at the time. Al Smith, former governor of New York and president of the company developing the Empire State Building, made several unsuccessful attempts to negotiate an end to the strike. The union reached an agreement with the Structural Steel Board of Trade of New York on May 12, ending the strike. By that time, Carew Tower workers who had not gone on strike had "'accomplished about all that was possible'" without further steel work. The strike cost workers nearly $2 million ($38.5 million in 2025) in lost wages. It lasted 49 days and occurred over a period of largely favorable weather for building, but a project official stated that construction would still roughly follow its original schedule.

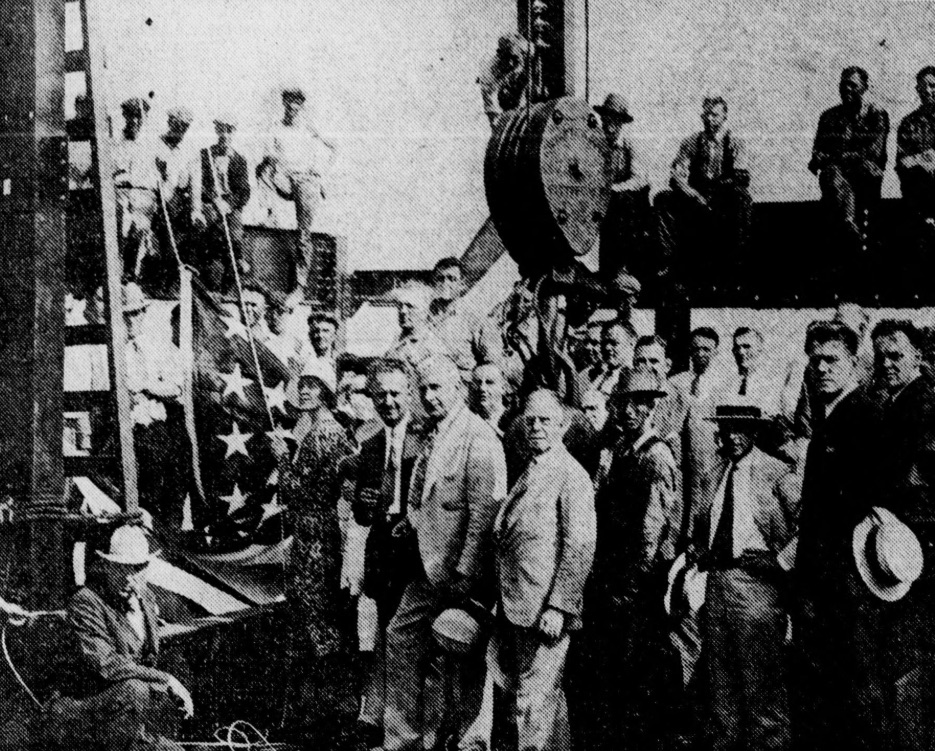
The topping out ceremony on July 9, 1930

An initial team of steel setters returned to the project on May 13, with 600 men expected to be at work on the framework by the end of the week. Once construction resumed, workers averaged a floor of steel raised per day. Two women were struck by metal falling from the tower on June 11, prompting the construction of a wooden canopy to protect pedestrians. Work on the 25th floor began on June 19, marking the completion of over half of the steel framework. Stonework on the lower levels was nearly complete by that time, and brickwork had advanced to the ninth floor. A fire broke out on the 22nd floor on June 23, which was extinguished by city firefighters. On June 26, three Soviet representatives from the state-owned Avtostroy toured the building as part of a study of American engineering developments. A fire on the 13th floor was extinguished on June 29. On July 5, the tower became the tallest building in the city after work began on the 44th floor. By July 6, two workers had died from construction-related incidents. Emery's wife raised an American flag over the tower on July 9 to commemorate its topping out. With 15,000 tons of steel raised over 61 days, the speed at which the framework had been completed set a world record.

The Carew Tower was one of several Cincinnati projects affected by a steamfitter walkout on July 24. On July 26, exterior brickwork on the hotel portion of the complex was finished. Brickwork on the tower was completed on August 8. Unions ordered a walkout strike on August 21 after wood trim was shipped to the construction site pre-painted by non-union workers. Later that day, a deal was reached to leave the existing paint intact, but to have future wood painted by union employees. Work resumed on August 22. Brickwork on the garage was completed on September 29.

The tower opened to tenants on October 1, 1930. The hotel followed on January 28, 1931. The garage was operational by the time the hotel opened, though its formal dedication ceremony did not occur until February 14. 17 months passed between the announcement of the project and its completion. The project involved over 2000 workers in total, making it among the largest employers in Cincinnati at the time. The total cost of the complex was $33 million ($636 million in 2025), which was "an enormous sum for that time". Of this, $15 million had gone towards the land, while $15 million was dedicated to construction. At the time, the project was the largest realty deal in American history.

=== Early commercial use ===
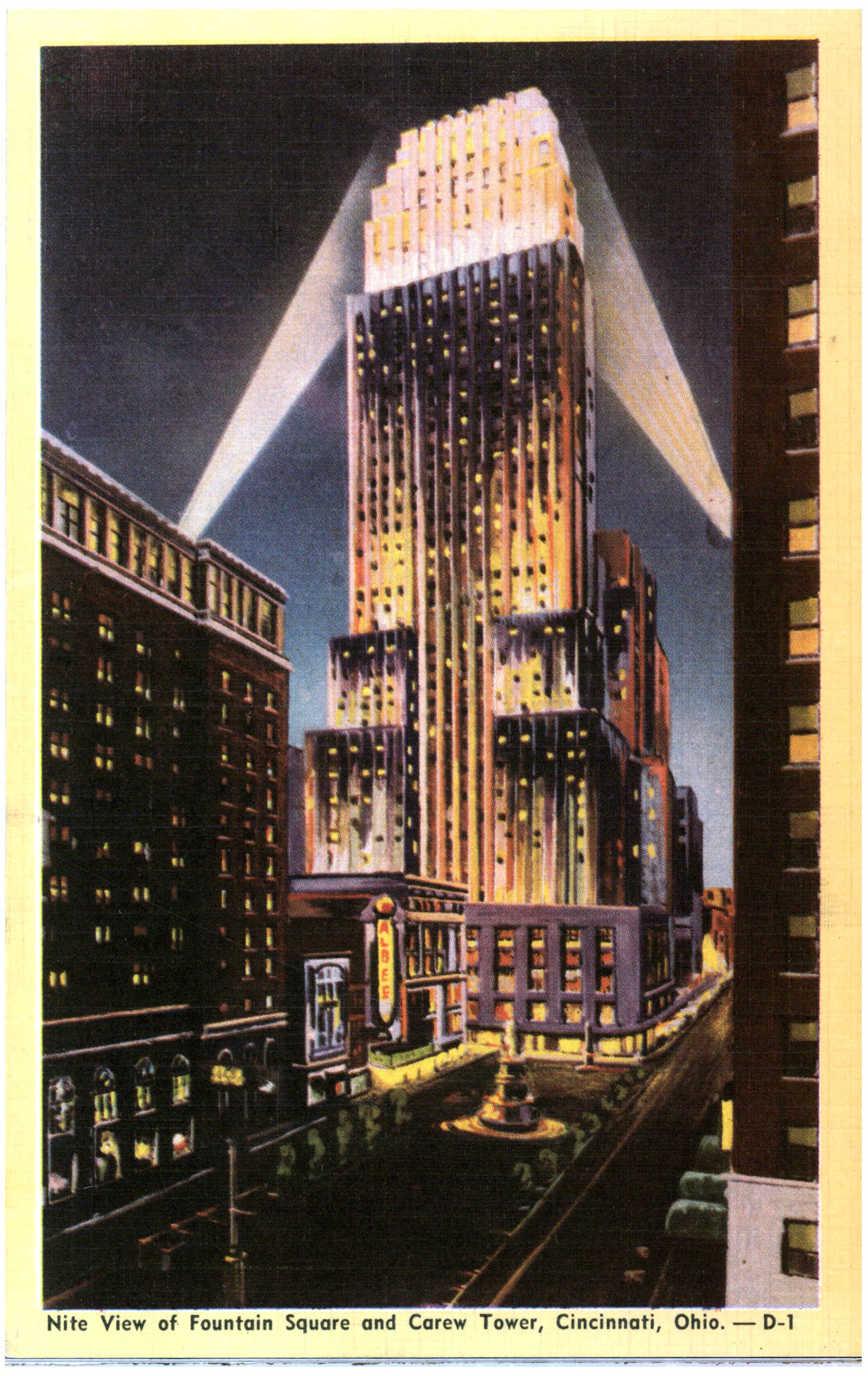
Postcard showing the tower illuminated at night

Emery initially leased control of the Carew Tower to William A. Starrett's Starrett Ohio Corporation. Thomas Emery's Sons owned the land that the tower was built on, but was only a minority partner in the Starrett Ohio Corporation. Following the death of Starrett, Thomas Emery's Sons acquired a majority stake in his company in November 1932, allowing it to take ownership of the complex. The Starrett Ohio Corporation, renamed Carew Tower, Inc., subsequently gave Thomas Emery's Sons control of leasing arrangements in the tower. Thomas Emery's Sons also moved its headquarters to the tower following the acquisition.

The tower's first commercial tenant was Edward J. Reardon of the Carney Cement Co., who opened his office on the 29th floor on October 1, 1930. Thousands of guests attended Mabley & Carew's formal opening on October 7, with Governor Myers Y. Cooper delivering remarks and Vincent Lopez providing music. H. & S. Pogue also moved into the retail arcade shortly after the tower's opening, and the two department stores served as the largest tenants in the arcade. The tower's formal inspection occurred on November 3, with over 4000 guests touring the building. Emery's own Emery Industries was one of the earliest commercial tenants to move into the tower, where it would remain until 1985. In July 1931, an employee of the Frederick A. Schmidt Co. stated that the tower was over 70% occupied. A 1940 article in The Cincinnati Enquirer stated that the tower was only 22% occupied upon the Emery acquisition in 1932. After Emery became president of the Charter Committee in 1935, the Committee moved its headquarters to the tower. Beginning in March 1939, the Crosley Broadcasting Corporation and its affiliate WLW rented out the entire 48th floor of the tower for use as a television studio, developing the experimental television station W8XCT. By February 1940, occupancy had risen to over 90%. Major League Baseball commissioner Happy Chandler had an office in the tower due to its proximity to his home state of Kentucky, and National League president Warren Giles maintained an office in the building in the 1950s and 1960s. Mabley & Carew left the tower in 1960, allowing H. & S. Pogue to expand into its section of the arcade.

The hotel, which featured 800 rooms upon its completion, was initially named St. Nicholas Plaza after Cincinnati's defunct St. Nicholas Hotel. The hotel's first manager was Viennese hotelier Joseph Reichl of St. Nicholas Plaza, Inc., who had leased control of the hotel from the Starrett Ohio Corporation in October 1930. Ohio Governor George White was granted the hotel's first registration card, though White did not personally visit the hotel at the time. The opening dinner on January 28, 1931 was attended by almost 1000 guests. Reichl hired bandleader Wayne King to perform at the hotel for its first weeks of operation, and King composed the "St. Nicholas Plaza March" to play on the opening night. On February 3, a court ruled that the rights to the St. Nicholas name belonged to the Hotel Sinton, which purchased the name in 1911. As the hotel had already ordered over $300,000 ($6.35 million in 2025) in supplies monogrammed with the original name's initials, hotel officials sought a replacement with the same initials. After considering over 2000 alternative names, Reichl and Starrett Brothers decided upon "Starrett's Netherland Plaza" on February 7. The new name was abbreviated as "St.'s Netherland Plaza" on hotel signage, though the general public was expected to exclude Starrett's name. "Netherland" referenced the hotel's location in the low-lying basin of the Ohio River.

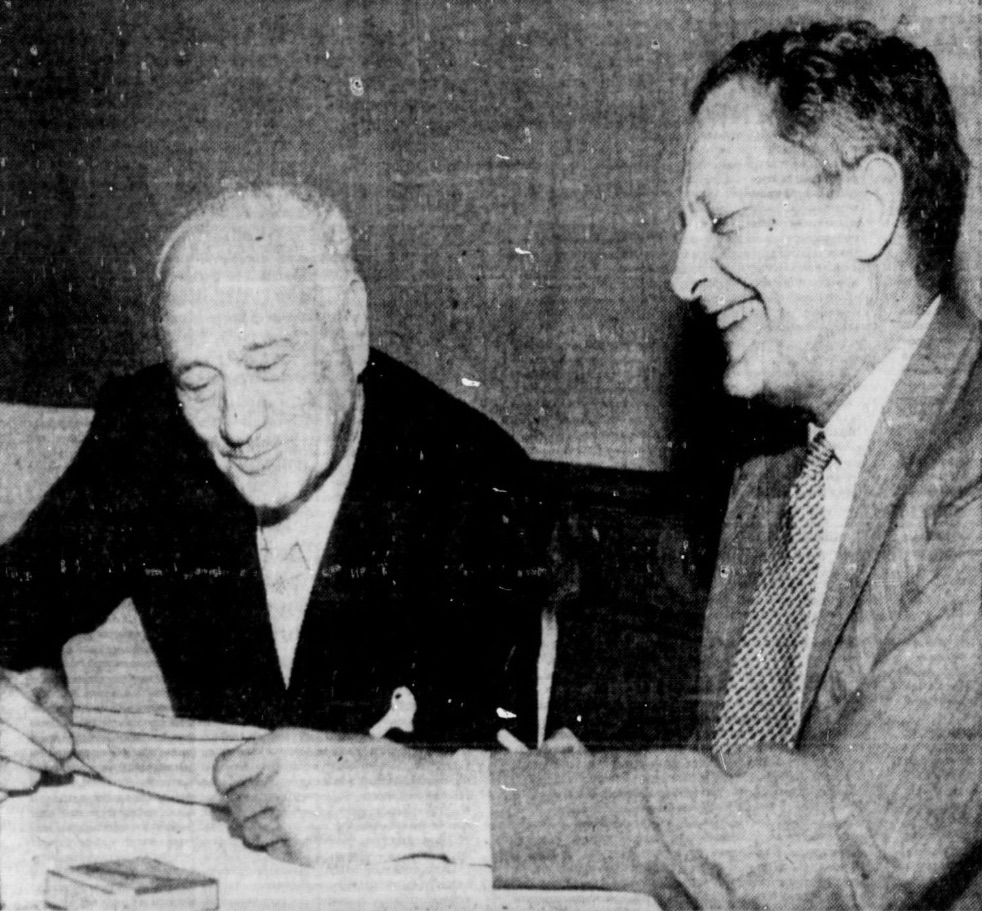
Conrad Hilton (left) hands John J. Emery a check for the 1956 hotel deal

After Thomas Emery's Sons acquired the complex in 1932, Starrett's name was removed from the hotel, leaving Netherland Plaza as its full name. Reichl was reappointed hotel president after the acquisition. Upon Reichl's resignation in 1933, Emery hired Ralph Hitz's National Hotel Management Company to run the Netherland Plaza. The hotel returned to local management in January 1940 after Hitz's death and the subsequent dissolution of his company. A fire broke out in the Netherland Plaza on January 21, 1942, causing at least $400,000 ($7.88 million in 2025) in damage to the hotel and retailers. It was Cincinnati's costliest fire "in many years" at the time. In 1956, Hilton Hotels purchased the Terrace Plaza Hotel and acquired a 25-year lease to the Netherland Plaza for $25 million ($296 million in 2025). The hotel was subsequently renamed the Hotel Netherland Hilton. Much of the original Art Deco architecture was concealed by a modernization effort in the 1960s.

The complex's garage formally opened as the Carew Tower Parking Garage on February 14, 1931. The management company of the garage was founded under the name Fountain Square Parking Unit, Inc. in January 1930, but changed its name to Carew Tower Parking Unit, Inc. in October of that year. On October 31, 1931, the company was sued by two employees of its parent company, National Parking Garages, Inc., who sought to dissolve it. The company was placed into receivership the day the suit was filed, but exited receivership at the end of the following month, with the plaintiffs dismissing their petition on December 1. By the late 1950s, the garage was struggling to meet use expectations. In 1962, Thomas Emery's Sons stated that it was considering a $2 million ($21.3 million in 2025) plan to convert the garage into a residential building with 200 efficiency apartments. An Emery spokesperson stated that the garage's "operating costs do not make it a good investment". The conversion did not materialize, and the garage closed in 1979.

In June 1942, Thomas Emery's Sons consolidated its debts, including the tower's original mortgage, into a single $11.5 million ($227 million in 2025) mortgage held by Prudential Insurance. The new mortgage was the second-largest in Cincinnati history, behind only the tower's first mortgage. In March 1967, Thomas Emery's Sons sold the land occupied by the Carew Tower to New York-based Bankers Trust for an undisclosed amount, which then leased the land back to Thomas Emery's Sons for 30 years. At the time, the county estimated the value of the land to be $2,132,100 ($20.6 million in 2025). As part of the deal, Thomas Emery's Sons also took out an $11.2 million ($108 million in 2025) mortgage on the tower from Bankers Trust. The Prudential mortgage had "long since been paid off" by that time. On October 1, 1969, Thomas Emery's Sons sold the tower for $12,354,029 ($134 million in 2025) to the Emery Realty Co. The sale resulted in no changes to the tower's management; Emery family members chose to operate through Emery Realty in an attempt to circumvent the trustee of Thomas Emery's Sons.

=== Renovations and Belvedere acquisition ===
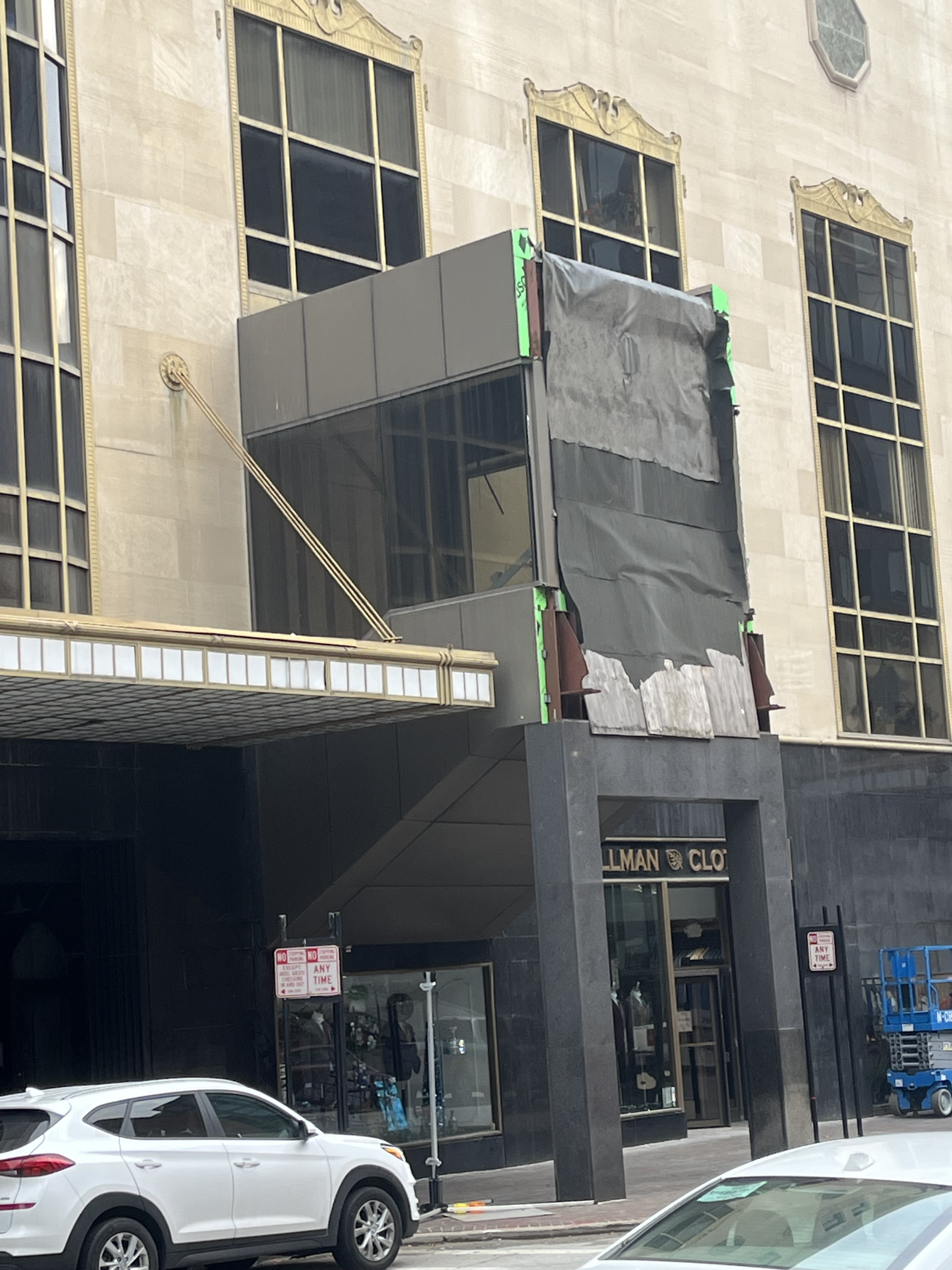
The remnant of a demolished skywalk over Race Street protrudes from the base of the Netherland Plaza in 2025

In 1980, Emery Realty agreed to connect the Netherland Plaza to a Race Street portion of the Cincinnati Skywalk on the condition that it would choose the exact location of the skywalk. In 1981, Hilton declined to renew its lease over the hotel, which closed at the end of the year as it began a major remodel. The $28 million ($99.2 million in 2025) remodel restored much of the original architecture and consolidated numerous rooms, decreasing the total room count to 624. By June 1982, Emery Realty had rejected the city's proposal to use the planned Race Street skywalk to connect a new Hyatt Regency and Saks Fifth Avenue complex to the hotel's Palm Court, which was being converted into a restaurant. As the city had already informed Saks and the Department of Housing and Urban Development that it would build the skywalk, the city planned to construct a $475,000 ($1.58 million in 2025) "bridge to nowhere" that would cross Race Street without actually entering the Netherland Plaza. In September 1982, Emery Realty sued the city over the skywalk, arguing that it would damage the architecture of the Palm Court and reduce pedestrian traffic for the arcade's Race Street entrance. The city's Historic Conservation Board approved the plan in January 1983, stating that the skywalk would not harm the historic nature of the building. In May, Emery Realty ended its lawsuit after the city agreed to adjust plans for the skywalk so that it would no longer enter the Palm Court. The hotel reopened in October 1983 under the management of Dunfey Hotels. The hotel became the Omni Netherland Plaza Hotel in April 1984 after Dunfey reorganized as Omni Hotels & Resorts.

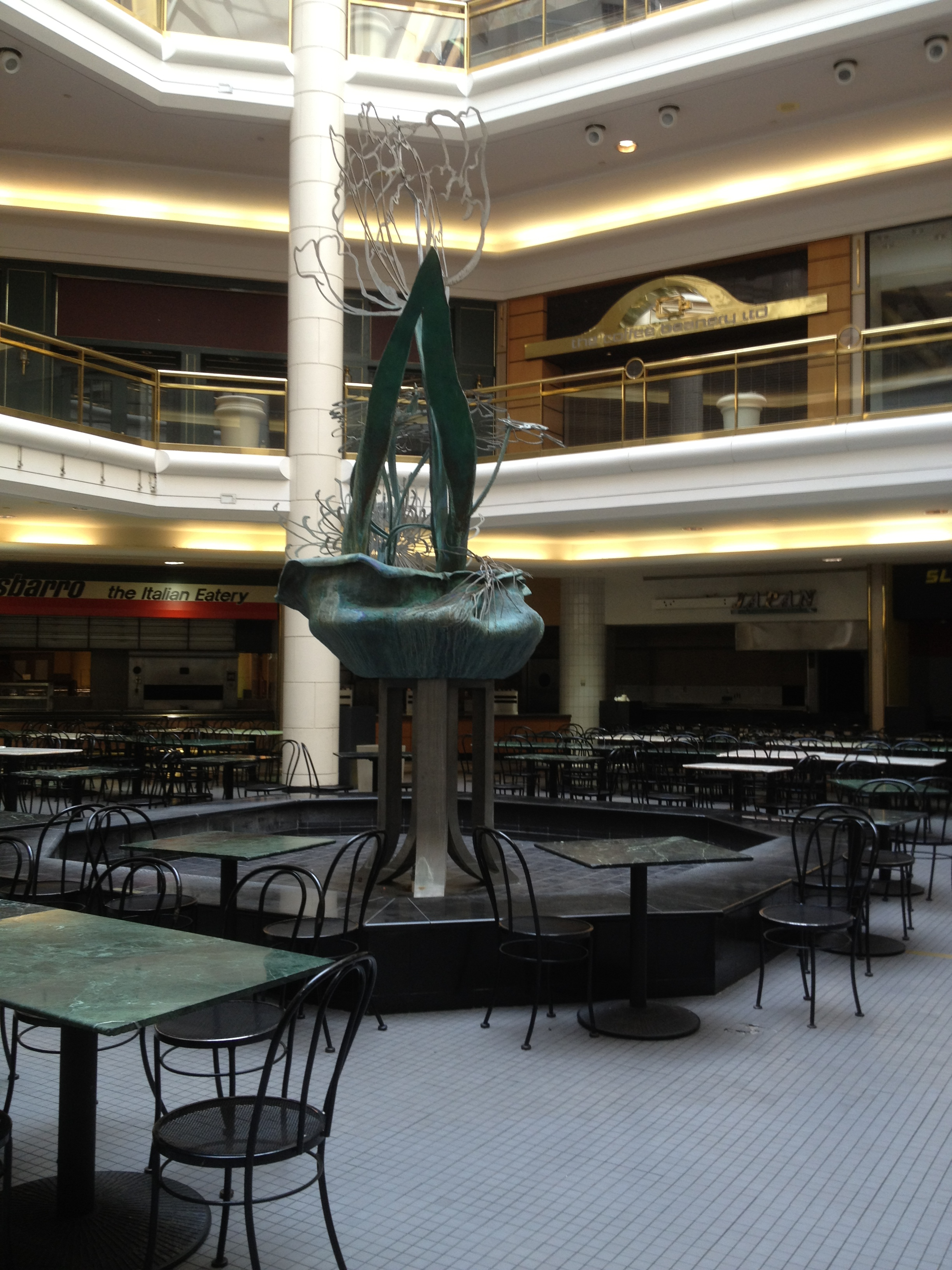
The vacant food court at Tower Place in July 2013

Emery Realty took out a $50.5 million mortgage in January 1988, borrowing $37 million from Western & Southern and $13.5 million from Fifth Third Bank. The money was used to pay off prior debts and buy out members of the Emery Holding Co. H. & S. Pogue, by then rebranded as L. S. Ayres, closed its Carew Tower location later that year. In June, developers Faison Associates of Charlotte, North Carolina and Noro Realty Advsiors of Atlanta announced plans for Tower Place, a shopping mall that would occupy the former Ayres space. Faison would serve as the primary developer, with Noro Realty Advisors and Emery Realty as partners. The mall's anchor stores were slated to be Saks Fifth Avenue and McAlpin's, both of which were pre-existing stores in separate buildings that would be connected to Tower Place by skywalks. Emery Realty planned a contemporaneous, $12 million renovation of the Carew Tower's retail arcade, which would be directly connected to Tower Place. Emery also sought to refurbish the Carew Tower's defunct parking garage. In July, the Cincinnati City Council agreed to support Tower Place with $6.5 million in tax increment financing. City officials intended for Tower Place to help revitalize the struggling downtown shopping industry. At Emery Realty's request, the council applied for a $3 million federal grant to renovate the Carew Tower garage, but Emery Realty later withdrew its request due to concerns that it would not meet the deadline. Plans for Tower Place were finalized in August 1988, with an estimated cost of $47 million and a projected opening in spring 1990.

In February 1989, demolition of the Ayres store was halted to prevent further damage to the Carew Tower's garage, which project engineers stated was at risk of collapsing. The demolition pause delayed the projected opening of the mall to June 1990. Emery Realty decided to demolish the garage as well, stating that it was "not economical" to find an alternative use for the structure. Councilman John Mirlisena stated that demolishing the garage could push the mall's opening into 1991. In April, Emery Realty agreed to give Faison control of leasing arrangements for the arcade. Demolition was scheduled to resume on May 8. On May 11, the city council agreed to purchase the Parkdale Garage from Emery Realty for $9.5 million, which would be used to finance the demolition of the Carew Tower garage and the arcade renovation. The city also loaned Emery Realty $2 million for skywalk improvements. The Cincinnati Enquirer stated that Tower Place was "on the brink of being abandoned" before the council's intervention. By then, the projected opening had been delayed again to August 1990. In the summer, Emery Realty borrowed an additional $4 million from Fifth Third to finance the arcade renovation and garage demolition. In July, union officials demanded that Tower Place workers be paid the prevailing wage. Faison threatened to cancel the project in response. On September 13, the city council sided with Faison, setting aside $1 million to spend on any penalties incurred by Faison for paying lower wages. Excavation began on October 12. Later that month, owners of the nearby Gidding-Jenny building won a temporary restraining order against Faison, preventing Tower Place workers from inserting metal rods for the mall's walls into Gidding-Jenny property. The suit was resolved after Faison agreed to connect Tower Place to Gidding-Jenny via walkways.

Emery Realty defaulted on its 1988 mortgage in January 1990. The Belvedere Corporation subsequently became co-owner of the complex. Belvedere announced that it would invest over $30 million in a renovation of the arcade, office space, and hotel. In February, Faison informed the city council that Tower Place would not be open by fall 1990. The delay was the result of a disagreement over whether or not the former Ayres garage, owned by Shell Pension Trust, would be connected to the new Tower Place garage. Construction was also delayed when a worker was struck by falling bricks. By the end of February, Faison stated that it was targeting an opening date in the spring or fall of 1991. Operating through the limited partnership Carew Partners, Belvedere purchased the entire stock of the Emery Holding Co. in April, giving it full ownership of the Carew Tower complex. Construction resumed in June after Shell Pension Trust gave Faison an easement to connect the Ayres and Tower Place garages. The following month, a Hamilton County judge ruled in Faison's favor on the prevailing wage dispute. Shell Pension Trust purchased a half-interest in Carew Partners in December, with Belvedere continuing to manage the complex. Tower Place, which cost at least $60 million ($142 million in 2025), opened in August 1991. In July 1992, the Enquirer referred to Tower Place as "a success", but stated that it was largely attracting customers from other downtown retailers rather than drawing new consumers downtown.

Belvedere became the manager of the Netherland Plaza in 1996, though the hotel remained an Omni franchise. The hotel entered into a franchise agreement with Hilton in 2002, at which point it became known as the Hilton Cincinnati Netherland Plaza Hotel. Hilton announced that they would renovate the hotel for an undisclosed amount, with the elevators and bathrooms being a focus for renovation. Belvedere Hotels spent almost $10 million on another renovation in 2012.

In 1997, the tower was connected to Fountain Place via a skywalk across Fifth Street, which was the last portion of the skywalk network to be built. The Cincinnati Enquirer referred to it as "perhaps the most visible segment of the skywalk system". The skywalk was demolished in October 2020. Taking place amidst the wider dismantling of the skywalk network, the Fifth Street segment was specifically removed to facilitate 3CDC's renovation of a former Macy's department store that had previously occupied Fountain Place.

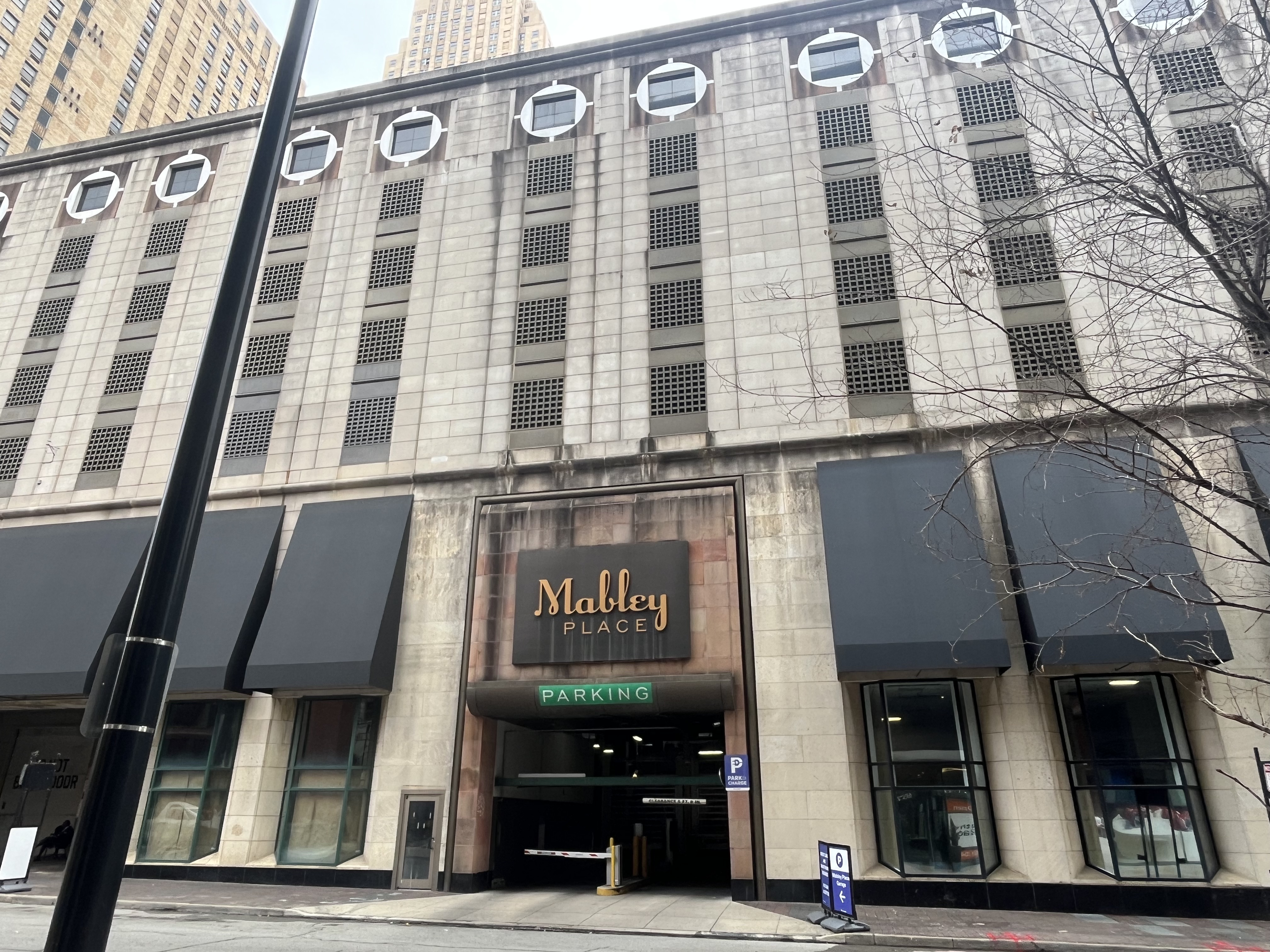
Mabley Place

Faison transferred management of Tower Place to Madison Marquette at the beginning of 2004. In January of that year, The Cincinnati Post stated that Tower Place's "role as a magnet for downtown is in question", with the mall having lost several tenants in the early 2000s. The skywalk between Tower Place and McAlpin's, which had closed in 1996, was slated to be demolished in September 2004. Northeastern Securities Development Corp. purchased Tower Place in August 2007. Madison Marquette agreed to a $200,000 settlement with the state government after the Ohio Department of Commerce stated that Madison Marquette lacked an Ohio real estate broker's license. In December 2007, Northeastern replaced Madison Marquette with CB Richard Ellis in response to the settlement. By 2012, the city government was considering buying the mostly vacant Tower Place and a nearby parking garage for $8.8 million. The purchase was completed for $8.5 million the following year to prevent the mall from entering foreclosure. The remaining tenants subsequently vacated the building. The city sold the mall for $1 to an affiliate of developer JDL Warm, which announced a $5 million plan to convert it into a 775-spot parking garage with retail space on the exterior of the first floor. The proposed name of the garage was Mabley Place, referencing Mabley & Carew. The garage opened in the fall of 2014. Mabley Place sold for $15 million less than three months later, with a Nevada-based investor acquiring a majority interest.

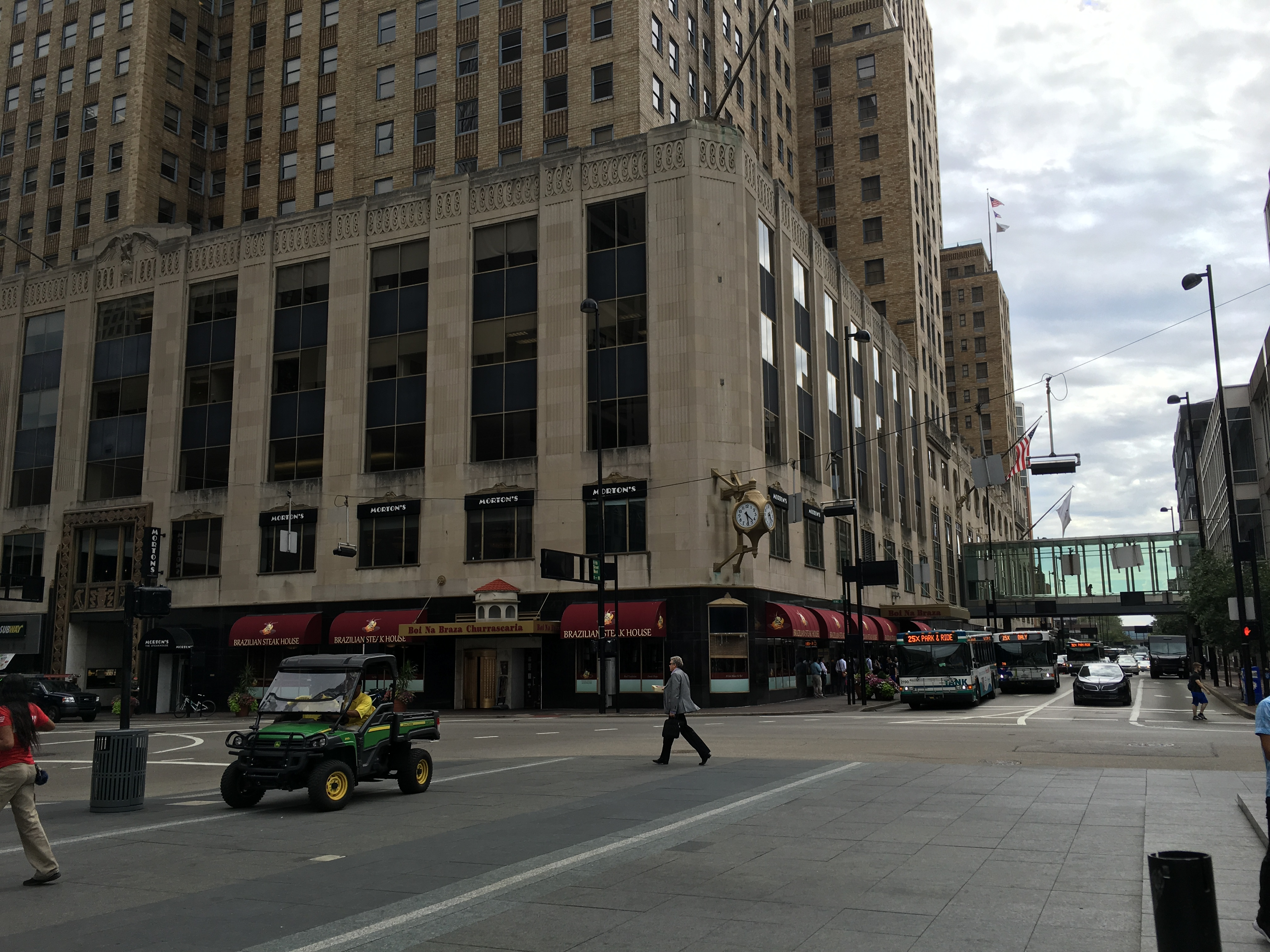
The base of the tower in 2016, showing its lower-level retailers and a now-demolished skywalk connection

The Carew Tower was one of four Cincinnati high-rises listed for sale in 2006 amidst rising vacancy rates for downtown office buildings. In 2012, a mortgage from Fifth Third Bank with a maximum principal indebtedness of $81.5 million and a maturity date of 2037 was filed with the Hamilton County recorder's office. In 2013, the tower had a vacancy rate of 13%, which was 10% lower than the downtown average. In January of that year, Cincinnati Vice Mayor Roxanne Qualls stated that a residential conversion of the tower was the subject of "active talks" as part of the city's push to encourage downtown housing. After Belvedere denied this report in a letter to tenants, Qualls stated that the talks had taken place among community members and city officials rather than with Belvedere. In August 2013, Belvedere CEO Alex Warm dismissed suggestions for residential conversion, stating that revenue from the offices and hotel was sufficient.

The tower lost several tenants in the early 2010s, including the Greater Cincinnati Chamber of Commerce and the Music Teachers National Association. In November 2014, investor Greg Power became the owner of both the Belvedere Corporation and the Carew Tower complex. At the time, the Hamilton County auditor valued the building at $62.4 million. In 2017, a plan was submitted to divide the tower into condominiums, prompting media speculation about potential residential conversion. In early 2019, nearly half of the retail and office space in the tower was vacant. By September of that year, Power had asked a tenant in the building to consider moving to lower floors to make way for residential condos on the upper levels. Carew Realty Inc. also took out a loan of over $9 million from First Financial Bank in 2019. The observation deck on the tower's top floor, which had been a "beloved" attraction for tourists and locals, closed as a result of the COVID-19 pandemic. In 2020, remaining corporate tenants included Cincinnati magazine and two law firms.

=== Victrix acquisition and residential conversion ===
The tower was listed for sale in July 2020, with Cushman & Wakefield serving as the broker. The Netherland Plaza was not included in the sale. The 400,000 square feet of office space in the tower was valued at $18.4 million, while the Carew Tower Arcade, consisting of 110,000 square feet of retail space in the basement and on the first two floors, was valued at $9.7 million. In February 2021, Duke Energy threatened to disconnect the building's electricity due to Power's failure to pay utility bills, but later walked back on the threat. In October 2021, First Financial sold the 2019 loan to Veles Partners LLC. That month, Veles filed a foreclosure lawsuit against Power for defaulting on the $9.7 million mortgage. The city of Cincinnati also sought to gain over $600,000 in unpaid sewer bills from Power.

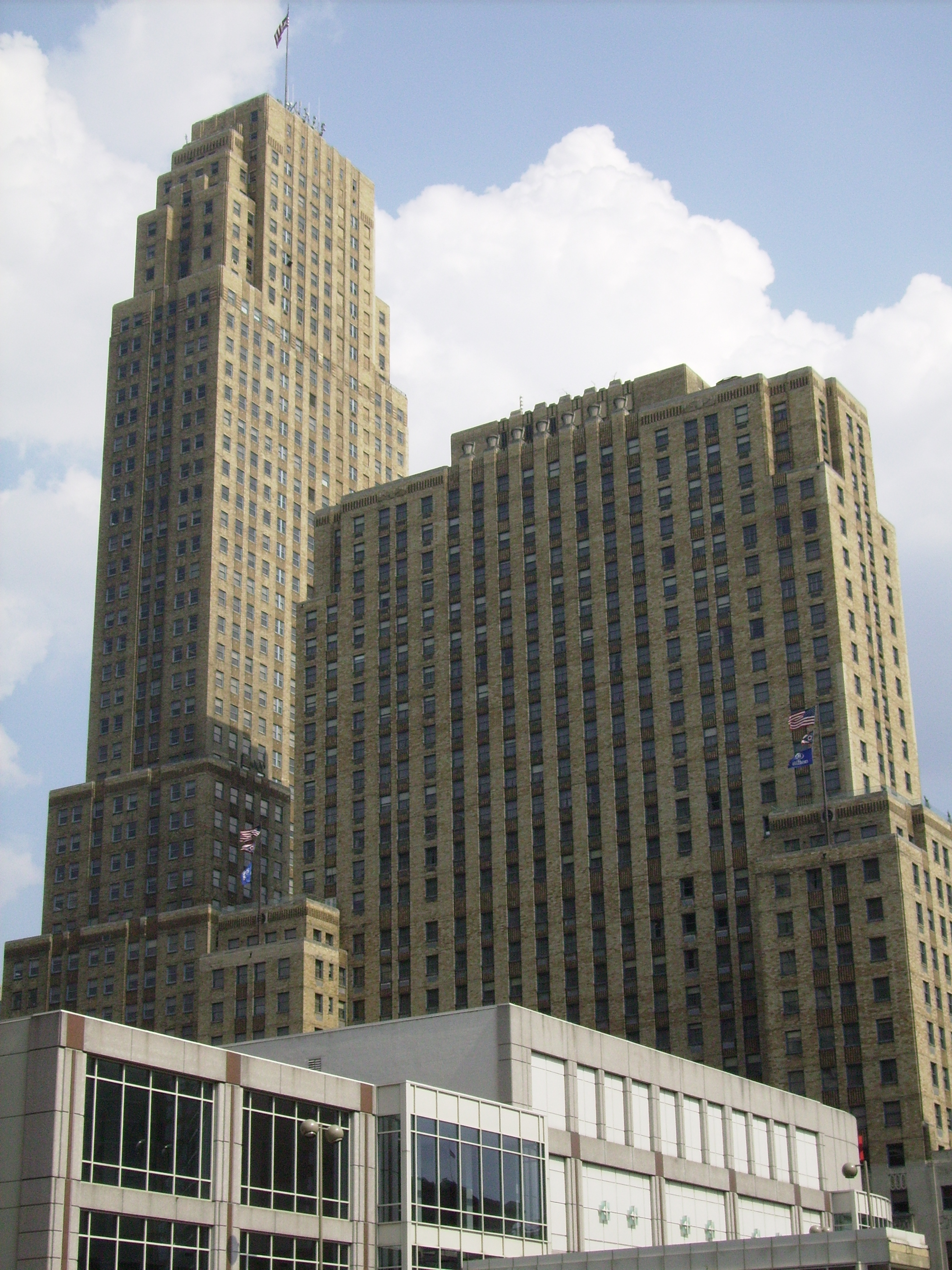
The complex viewed from the north. After the 2022 sale, the office and retail tower (left) was transferred to Victrix Investments LLC for residential conversion, while the hotel (right) continued to operate under its prior ownership

New York-based developer Victrix Investments LLC, a corporate affiliate of Veles Partners, purchased the tower for $18 million in August 2022. Power retained control of the Netherland Plaza, with Victrix only acquiring the office and retail tower. On the day of the sale, Veles dismissed its foreclosure suit, while a new deed was filed for Carew Tower that called for its utilities to be separated from those of the hotel. Victrix announced plans to convert the tower into a primarily residential building. The last corporate tenant to leave the building was law firm Wood, Herron, & Evans, which had been headquartered in the tower since November 1930 and was one of its first tenants. The month after the sale, Victrix's CEO filed a lien against the Netherland Plaza for $5.1 million in unpaid expenses related to the Carew Tower's division into three condominiums in 2017.

A foreclosure suit was filed against Netherland Plaza LLC in November 2022. The suit stated that the hotel had been in default on a $77 million loan since 2021. The hotel was placed into receivership the same month, which was intended to protect the hotel's relationship with Hilton and help prepare for a potential foreclosure sale. In November 2023, Magistrate Anita Berding of the Hamilton County Court of Common Pleas ruled against the hotel, determining that Power had defaulted on his loan and owed $84.9 million. Power was given three days after the ruling to pay back the owed funds, after which the hotel's lenders could choose to sell it at a sheriff's auction. Court rulings in 2024 found that Power also owed $1 million to the city and $1.6 million to the county for unpaid lodging taxes.

In December 2022, the state of Ohio awarded the Port of Greater Cincinnati Development Authority $6.4 million for brownfield environmental remediation at the Carew Tower. Planned remediation efforts included asbestos abatement, interior demolition, and the replacement of the building's roof. In November 2023, wind hit scaffolding while the building was undergoing renovation, causing bricks to fall from the tower. No injuries were reported, but a car was lightly damaged and sections of Vine Street and Fifth Street were temporarily closed. The following month, the tower received a $10 million tax credit from the state government for historic preservation, including the replacement of the building's metal windows and the repair of its exterior facade. At the time, the converted building was slated to include 385 apartments with amenities on floors 45 and 46. Victrix received an additional $4.2 million tax credit in January 2024 as part of a state program to encourage mixed-use development. In September 2024, the Port agreed to assist Victrix with obtaining construction materials for the tower's renovation without paying sales taxes.

By 2025, the plan for the tower's residential conversion called for 375 market-rate apartment units on the 4th through 49th floors, with 65,000 square feet on the first three floors reserved for retail space. The plan also called for ten units of short-term corporate housing. The conversion is projected to cost $162 million, of which $54 million will be paid by Victrix itself. In exchange for a 30-year tax abatement from the city government, Victrix would contribute $16.7 million to Cincinnati Public Schools and $1 million to the Cincinnati streetcar over the course of the abatement. On May 12, the city council's Budget and Finance Committee recommended that the conversion be approved. The city also planned to forgive the $2 million skywalk construction loan from 1989, which Victrix had inherited. The council unanimously approved the tax abatement, which city officials stated was necessary for the project to proceed, on May 14. The conversion was slated to begin in 2025 and finish by the end of 2029.

=== Jumpers ===
Several people have committed or attempted to commit suicide by jumping from the tower:

- On February 15, 1944, Martha Schrickel, aged 31, jumped to her death from the 26th floor.
- Later that year Oscar Perlmutter, a 61-year-old scrap dealer, jumped from the 42nd floor to his death.
- In 1952, Robert Maxwell Jones Jr., aged 26, rode an elevator up to the 45th floor, then stepped off to take the stairs to the observation deck. When he found the door to the deck locked, he opened a window on the 47th floor, and climbed out onto a three-foot ledge. Occupants in the building pleaded for Jones to climb back inside, but he refused, at one point, hanging by his hands off a ledge. Over 5,000 people gathered on the streets below to watch Jones. After several hours, rescuers managed to drag him back into the building.
- In 1953, 23-year-old Hazel Gundrum fatally leapt from the 43rd floor.
- In 1961, Dorothy Holt, aged 38, fatally jumped from the 49th story observatory.
- In 1969, a Price Hill resident, Barbara Ann Koch, jumped out of a window on the 40th floor to her death.
- In 1978, Robert McMurray, a 34-year-old arrested on an attempted rape charge, jumped from the 49th floor observation deck.
- In 1982, 14-year-old Frank Rosenberger jumped to his death from 21st floor.
- In 1992, 22-year-old Daniel Fluegeman jumped to his death from the 49th floor observatory, landing on the 16th floor patio of the Omni Netherland Plaza Hotel.
- In 2000, a woman leapt to her death from the 49th floor observatory.
- In 2016, a man jumped to his death from the 49th floor observation deck.

== Architecture ==
=== Exterior ===
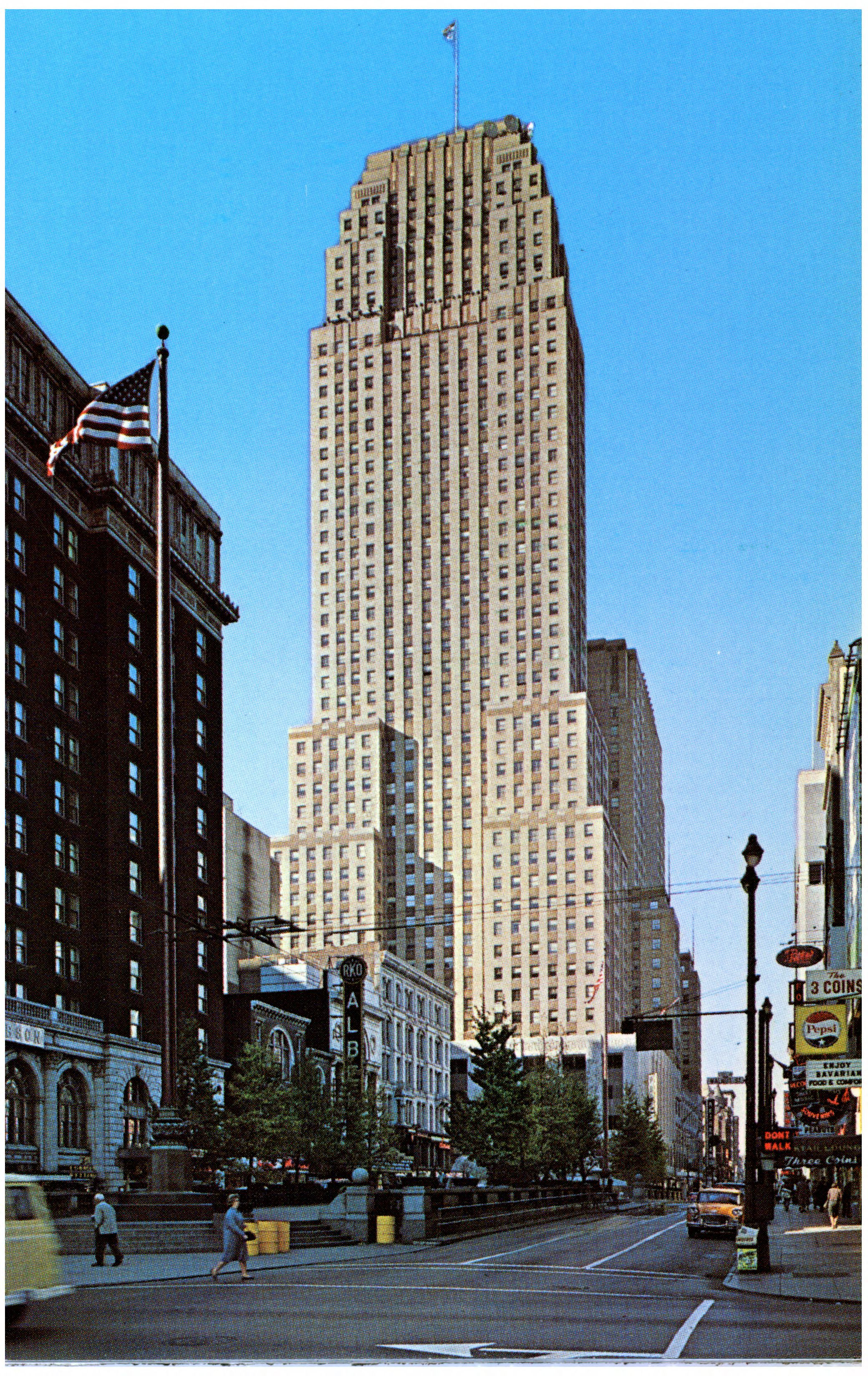
The east facade of the tower viewed from 5th Street

The Carew Tower and the Netherland Plaza share a five-story base. The first floor of the Carew Tower portion of the base consists of black granite with large windows, which are framed by “simple”, reeded white brass. The three-part windows of the limestone second floor feature ornamental lintels with cartouche. The Carew Tower's primary frontispiece, which leads into the retail arcade, occupies two stories in the central portion of the east facade. The frontispiece is decorated with cast metal bas-relief carvings of transportation methods. Two semicircular columns with palmette caps sit on both sides of the frontispiece. A sculpture of an eagle atop a globe, situated in front of a pediment and surrounded by foliated decoration, sits above the entrance to the arcade. Much of the tower's sculpture work was carried out by Rene Paul Chambellan. A section of the Cincinnati Skywalk connected the second floor of the east facade to the Westin Hotel. The remaining floors of the base are marked by pairs of recessed windows divided by fluted piers. The base's trim is decorated with an oval motif with limestone coping across the east and north facades.

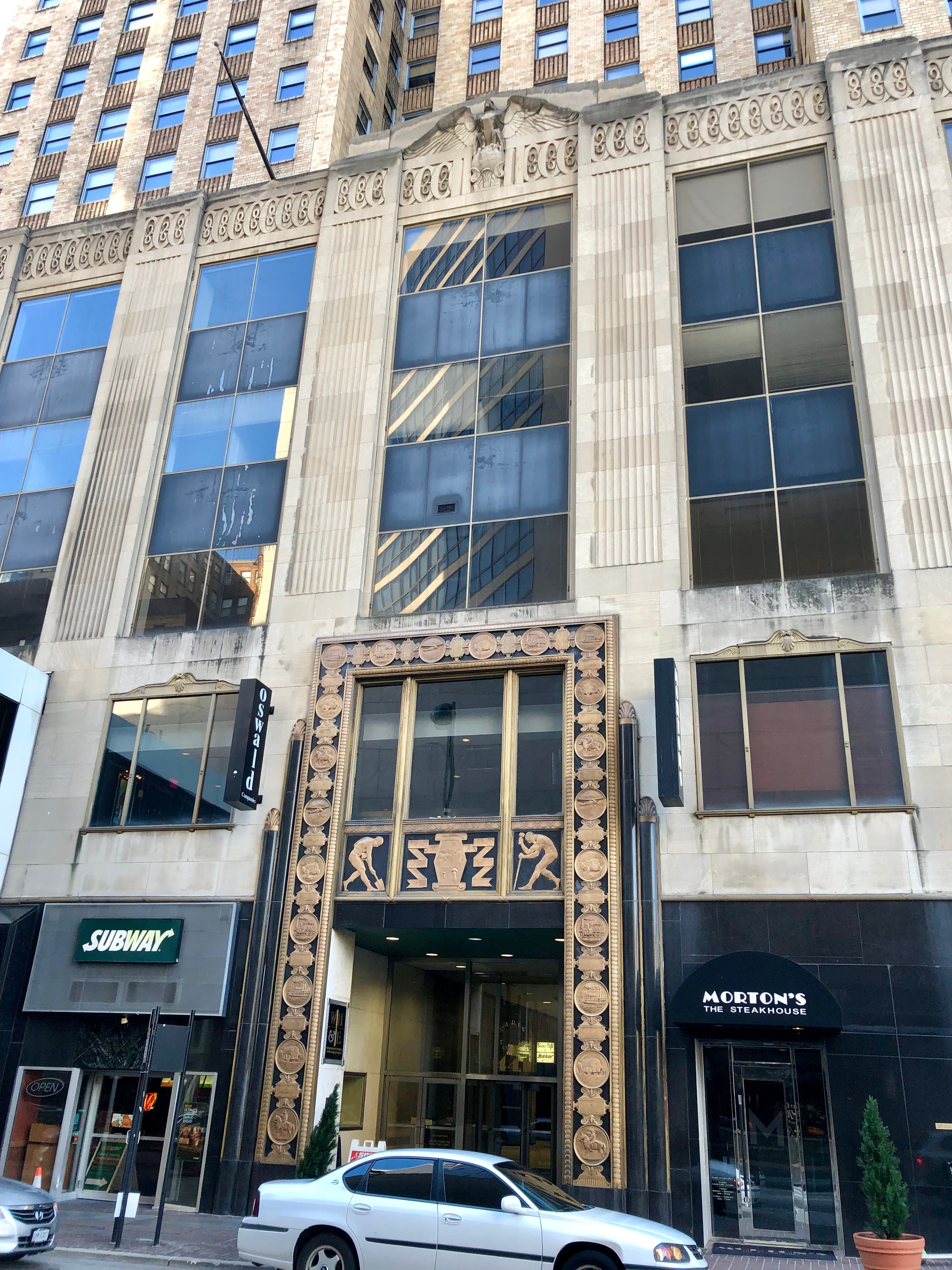
The tower's frontispiece

Beyond the base, the Carew Tower is predominantly made of yellow brick. The tower exterior was initially intended to be made of limestone, but financial pressure from the Great Depression prompted a switch to brick. The bays of the tower are framed by variegated piers and spandrels, creating a vertical emphasis. The center of the east facade is recessed by two bays. The recessed portion contains six bays, while the protruding walls on either side of the recess also contain six bays each. This arrangement continues until the 15th floor, where the protruding portions of the wall are set back by one bay. An additional setback five floors after renders all bays of the east facade flush with one another until the 38th story. From the 38th floor, the east facade is defined by multiple setbacks that culminate on the top floor. The spandrels on the upper floors are gilded, which adds “a distinctive element of the Art Deco style”. The north and south facades are similar to the east, but with fewer bays, giving the tower a north-south emphasis. The west facade also resembles the east, but with fewer setbacks on the upper floors.

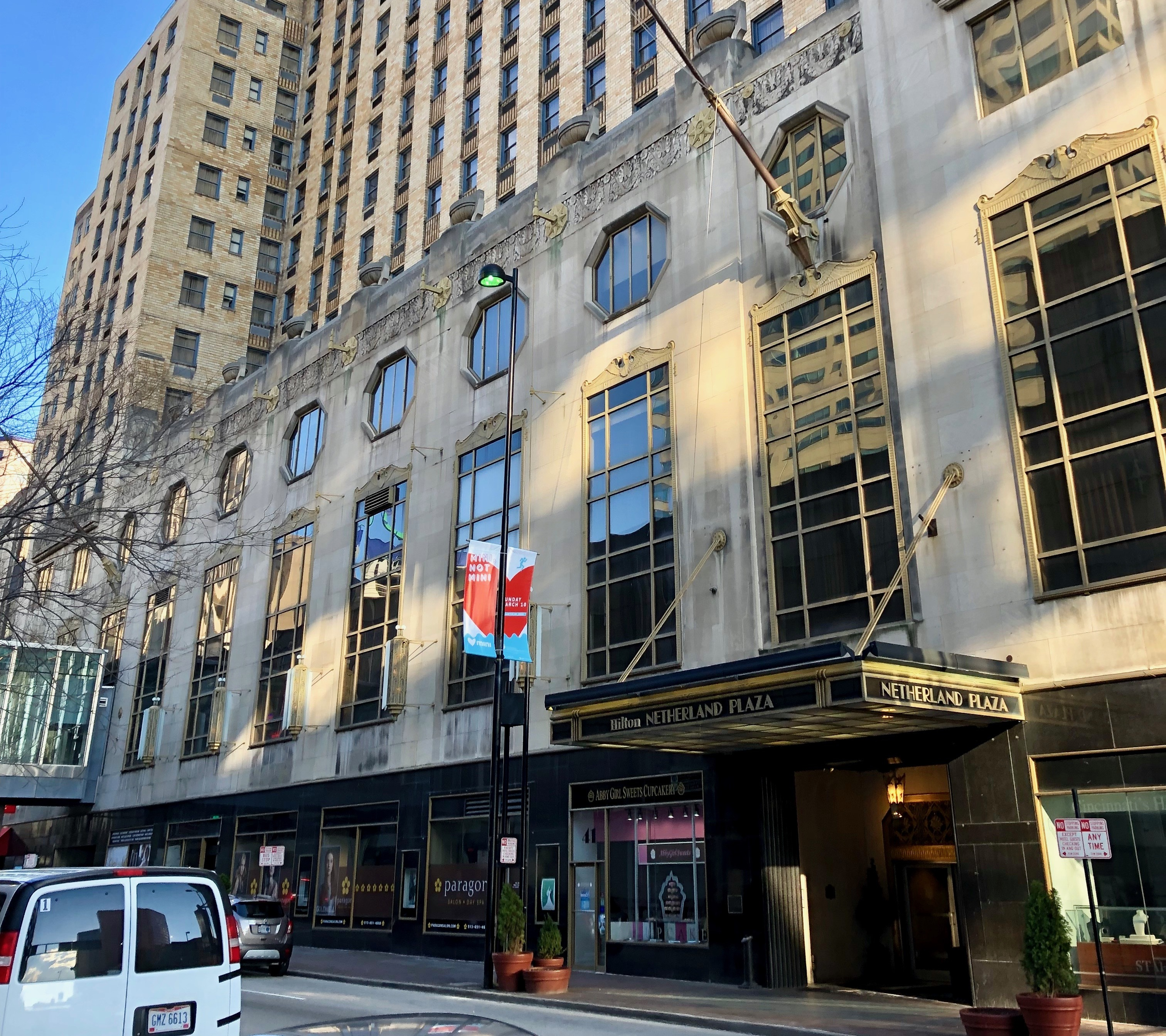
The base of the Hilton Netherland Plaza Hotel

The portion of the base occupied by the Netherland Plaza differs from that of the Carew Tower. The first floor of the north facade features display windows for the H. & S. Pogue department store and other retailers. The second and third floors share seven large, rectangular windows, which are topped by sculptures of eagles with outstretched wings. The lower portion of one of these windows was removed to add a skywalk. The roof line of the base is decorated with a flower motif and foliated swags. Free-standing urns are situated above the roof line. The entrances to the hotel on Fifth Street and Race Street are covered by porte-cochères, with a floral frieze above the Fifth Street entrance. The upper portions of the hotel largely resemble the Carew Tower, with similar brickwork and setbacks. The north and south facades feature a multi-bay design that contributes to the hotel's east-west orientation.

The parking garage also shared a common base with the rest of the complex. Like the hotel, it had an east-west orientation. Its east and west facades were divided into three bays, while the north and south facades mostly lacked windows. Its walls used the same materials as the tower and hotel. The garage's Race Street entryway was decorated with green terracotta and buff trimming, which was "designed to keep the entrance in harmony with the architecture and artistry of the Carew Tower development". The exit was located on Vine Street.

=== Interior ===
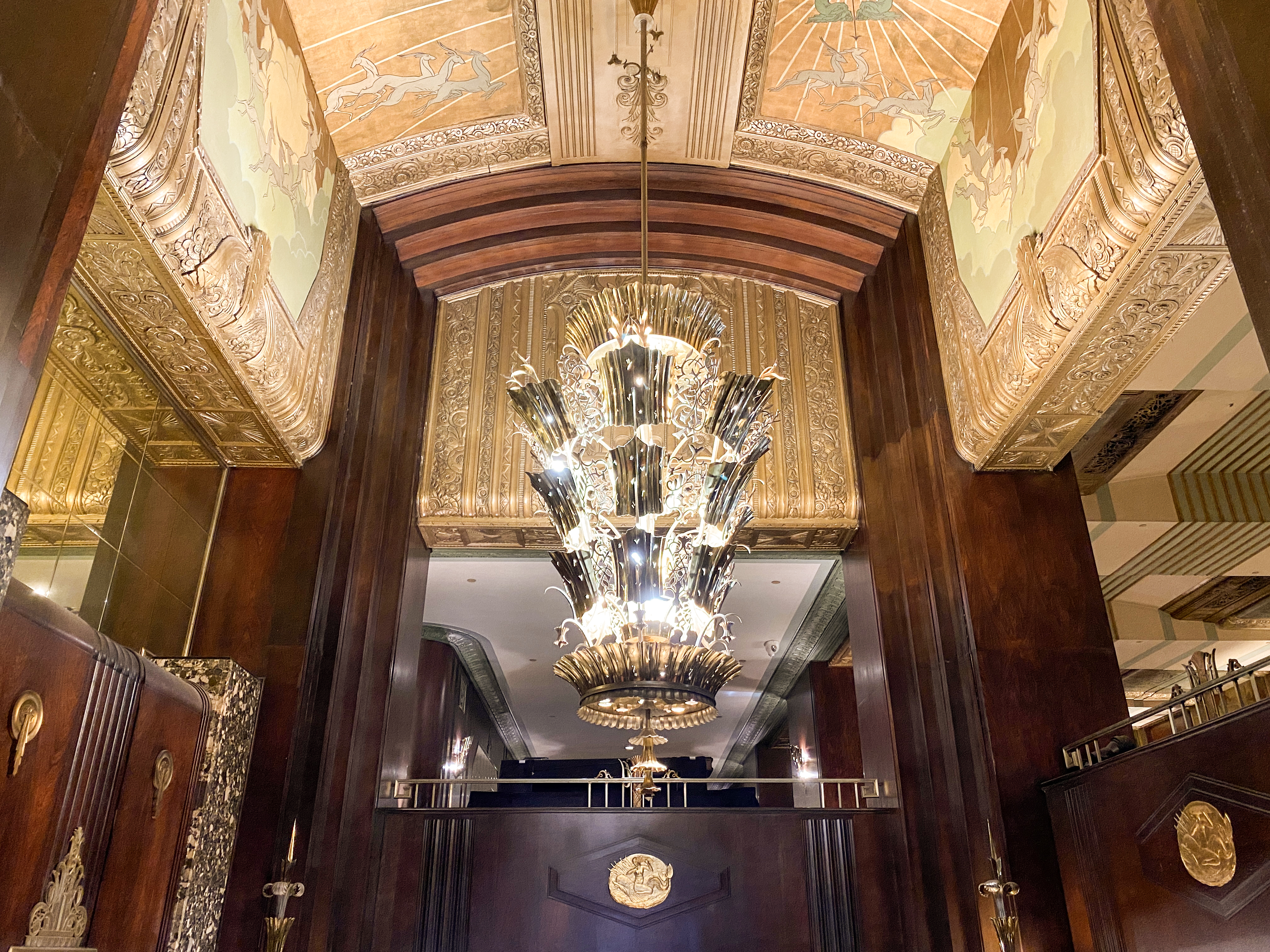
The ceiling of the hotel's grand staircase in French Art Deco style, showing the Louis Grell mural Bienvenu aux Voyageurs

The Carew Tower Arcade occupies the first two floors and the basement, containing 110,000 square feet of retail space. Some of the original Art Deco architecture in the arcade was altered by modernization efforts, though much of it was unaffected, particularly on the lower level. The arcade is decorated with Rookwood Pottery tiles bearing floral and geometric designs. The tower's Rookwood tile work was “the most expensive piece of faience tile ever done in the world” at the time. The air registers also display floral patterns. Display windows and doorways are enclosed by a metallic zig-zag design. The walls consist of a mixture of light and dark-colored stone. The lower level of the arcade, which provided access to the garage, contains travertine walls with arched display windows. Pseudo-dentillation is employed in the interior cornice, which is topped by an ornamental scallop design.

The Carew Tower contains 400,000 square feet of office space spread throughout most of the remaining floors. The office floors were modified over the years to suit various tenants, resulting in a range of styles throughout the building. The offices are marked by largely practical designs that are “lacking substantial interior significance”. The 49th floor of the building contains an observation deck, which had been a popular attraction for tourists and locals until it closed as a result of the COVID-19 pandemic.

The Netherland Plaza “exhibits extremely significant Art Deco treatment throughout its public spaces”. Compared to many Art Deco hotels, the Netherland Plaza "more closely reflects Art Deco ideals, while the other designs may more appropriately be termed 'Art Moderne' in style". Many of the hotel's Art Deco elements were directly influenced by similar designs showcased at the 1925 International Exhibition of Modern Decorative and Industrial Arts in Paris, such as metal grilles in the lobby inspired by the work of Edgar Brandt. The foyer of the hotel is made of Roman breccia. The grand staircase, flanked by Egyptian-style torchères, sits beneath a Louis Grell mural entitled Bienvenu aux Voyageurs (“Welcome Travelers”). The mural depicts a compass rose surrounded by 24 gazelles representing hours of the day. The main lobby displays Brazilian rosewood panels and columns atop marble bases. The elevators are surrounded by a heron and lotus pattern that is also found near the arcade's elevators.

==== The Palm Court ====
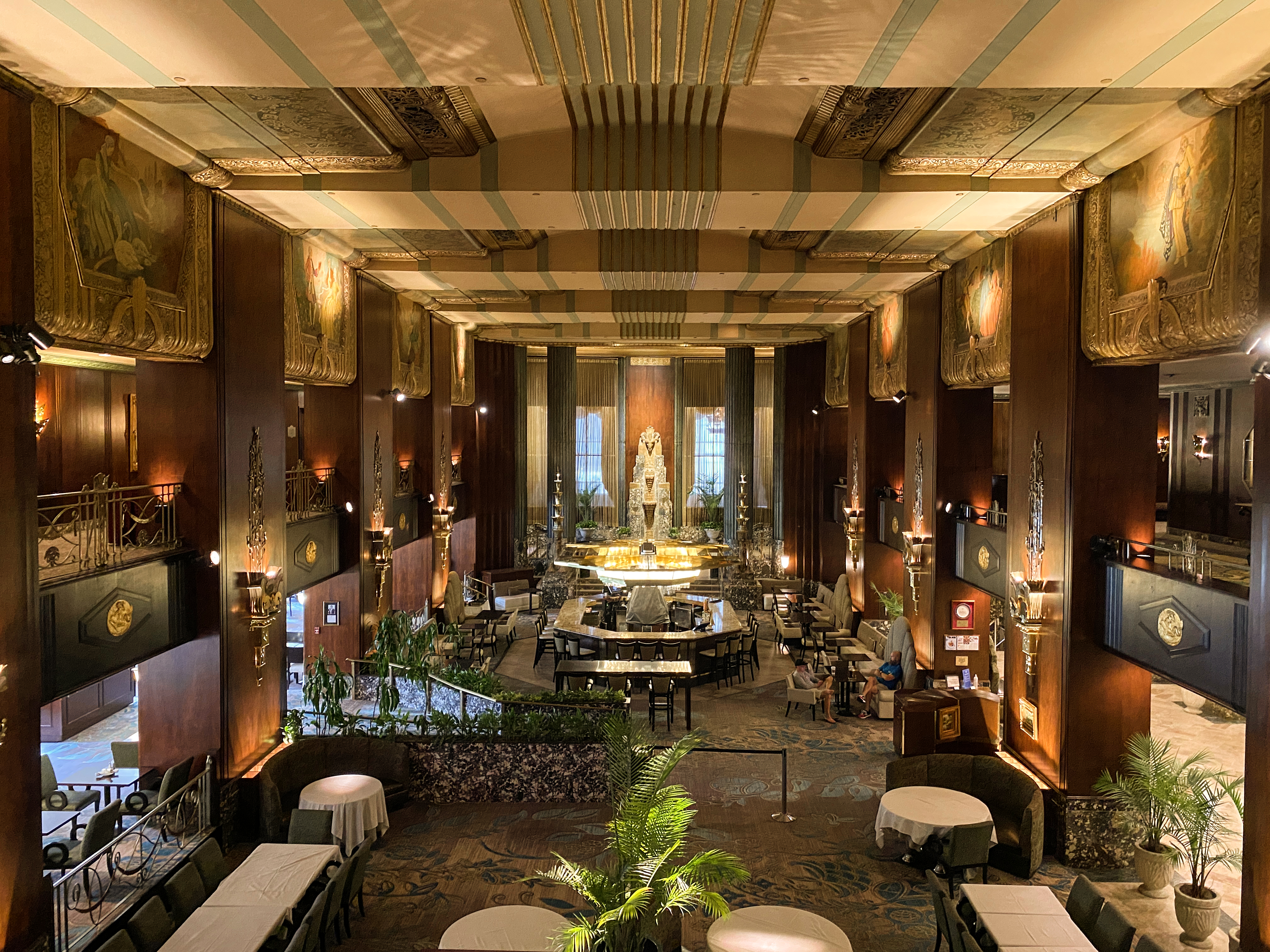
The Palm Court, the original lobby of the hotel

The original lobby of the hotel, the Palm Court, was later converted into a restaurant. The rosewood side walls are each divided into five bays. The ceiling was influenced by Egyptian step pyramids. A ziggurat-like Rookwood Pottery fountain sits at one end of the room, containing statues of seahorses and a ram. The Palm Court features ten wall-to-ceiling Grell murals. Rooted in the Louis XV style, the murals depict recreational scenes, with the outline of the Carew Tower visible in the background of each mural. The decorative motif of the room's railing is a stylized letter “L”, for Louis. A remodel in the 1980s added additional murals to the upper level of the room, depicting historic Cincinnati buildings.

Within the first-floor mezzanine of the hotel, the Apollo Gallery displays two Baroque Grell murals inspired by Greek mythology, entitled “Apollo on Chariot” and “Hunt of Diana”. The Apollo Gallery acts as the entryway to the Continental Room, which opened as the hotel's main dining area and also featured an ice rink. Four Grell murals, each depicting one of the four seasons, sit near the entrance to the room. The walls of the Continental Room were initially made of Oriental walnut, but the original walls were damaged in a renovation.

==== The Hall of Mirrors ====
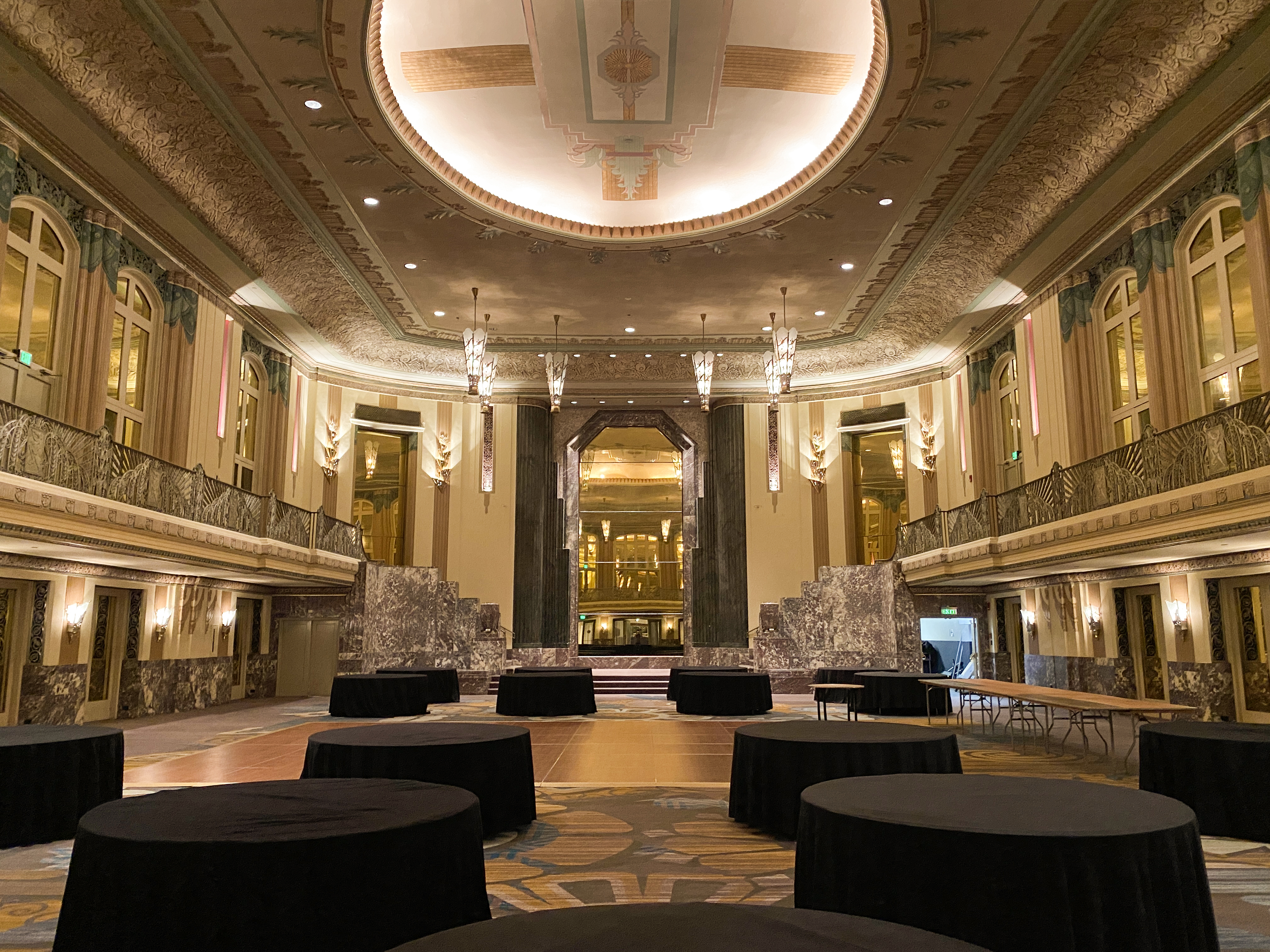
Interior view of the Hall of Mirrors

The third floor contains the Hall of Mirrors ballroom, emulating the Hall of Mirrors at the Palace of Versailles. The low ceiling of its foyer contrasts with the “soaring” height of the ballroom itself, which was intended to provoke an “emotional response”. The marble and plaster wall of the first floor is decorated with fluting and swags. Indirect lighting is provided by bronze and frosted glass sconces. The room is lined with gold-plated mirrors. A large mirror sits behind the ballroom's stage, which connects to a staircase to the balcony. The balcony's balustrades depict the god Pan. A floral trim circles the ceiling, while the central portion of the ceiling formerly contained a chandelier, which was damaged in a 1942 fire. During the hotel's renovation in the 1980s, the chandelier was unable to be replaced, so a mural of a chandelier was installed in its stead.

The hotel's original wedding chapel, the Julep Room, is adjacent to the foyer of the Hall of Mirrors. It was later used as a bar and as a space for small meetings. The paneling was initially made of walnut. The room is lined with decorative nickel silver pieces.

The staircases to the fourth floor feature murals made by Cincinnati artist Tom Bacher. Installed in 1984, the murals were made with luminescent paint that glows in dim light. The fourth floor contains the Pavilion Caprice, a nightclub. Aspects of the Pavilion were influenced by the ocean liner SS Leviathan, such as a carpet patterned with musical notes. The room's sunburst light features were intended to resemble a ship's portholes, containing glass panels painted with depictions of seafaring sights. The three columns in the nightclub were inspired by similar designs in the Großes Schauspielhaus, but with a more fluted appearance. The nightclub was redesigned several times “to reflect the popular decor of the respective periods”.

The fourth floor of the hotel also contains the Hall of Nations, originally known as the Corridor of Periods. The Hall features ten small meeting rooms, with the doorway of each room displaying a distinct architectural style. These styles include Greek Revival, Georgian, Neoclassical, Greco-Roman, Federal, Renaissance, Baroque, Romanesque Revival, Art Deco, and Empire.

As a Kent Automatic Garage, the complex's original parking garage featured an automated parking system. Three double-car elevators, each capable of carrying 10,000 pounds (4,500 kg) and traveling at 500 feet per minute (150 m/min), would convey vehicles to one of 700 parking spots. The fifth through twenty-fifth floors of the garage were devoted to parking, while another floor was designated as a space for washing and greasing cars.

=== Height ===
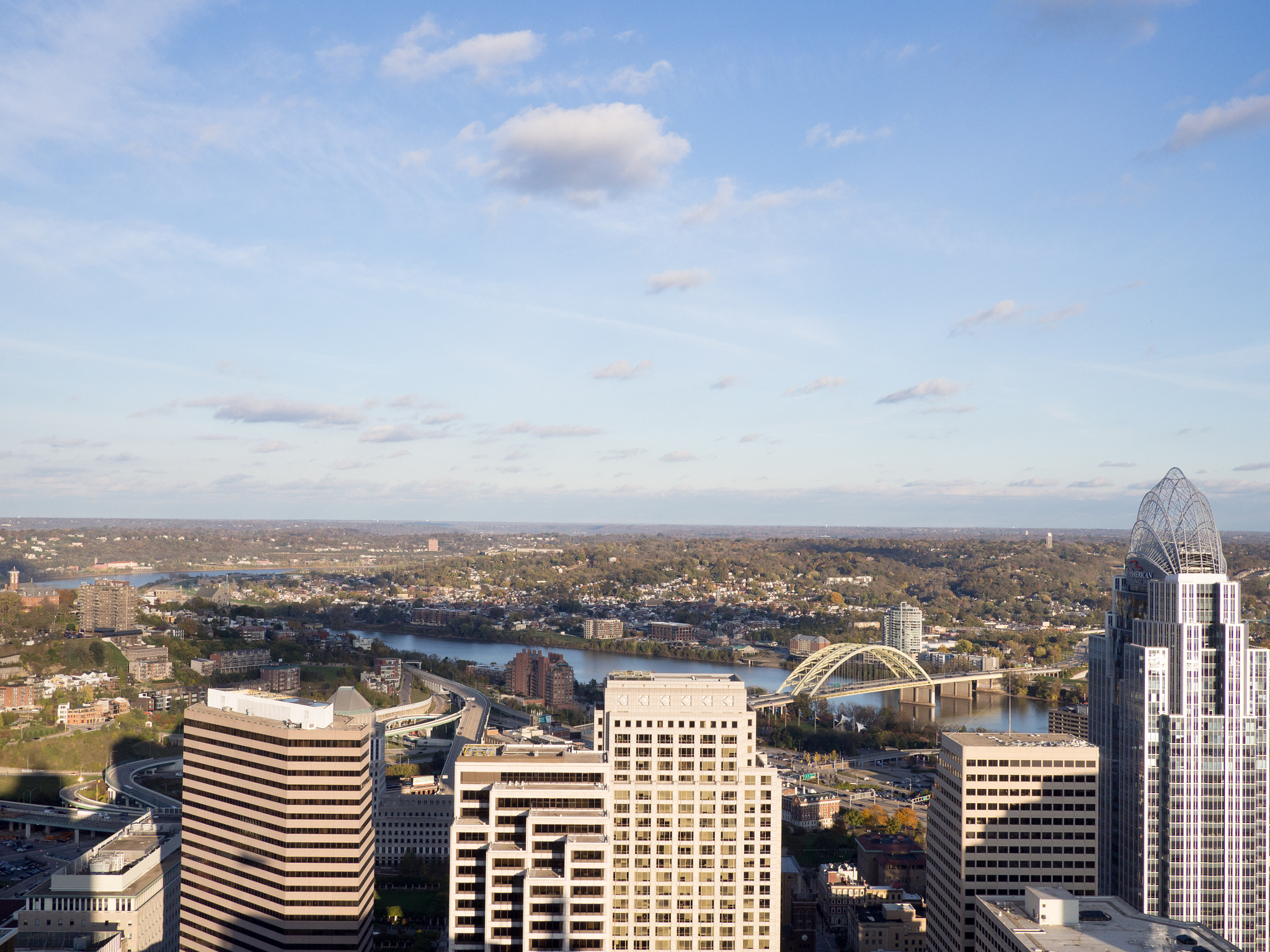
Looking east from the tower's observation deck. Visible on the right is Great American Tower, which displaced the Carew Tower as Cincinnati's tallest building in 2011

The Carew Tower stands 49 stories and 574 feet (175 m) tall, rising to 623 feet (190 m) when the flagpole on the roof is included. The initial plan for the tower only included 43 stories, but this was increased in November 1929. The tower is 218 feet (66 m) taller than Mount Airy, Cincinnati's tallest natural hill. It was the tallest building in Cincinnati at the time of its completion, surpassing the 1913 Fourth and Vine Tower, which stands 495 feet (151 m) tall. It was the second-tallest building in Ohio upon its construction, behind only Terminal Tower in Cleveland. The tower remained the city's tallest building until 2011, when it was displaced by Great American Tower at Queen City Square. The Carew Tower has eight more floors and more usable space than Great American Tower, but is roughly 90 feet shorter due to the tiara structure that adorns Great American Tower. Until the completion of Great American Tower, Cincinnati had been among the last major cities in the United States whose tallest building predated World War II.

The Netherland Plaza stands 31 stories and 372 feet (113 m) tall. When counted independently of the Carew Tower, it is the eighth-tallest building in the city. The parking garage stood 27 stories and 342 feet (104 m) high, making it the shortest of the three structures within the complex, but it was among the tallest buildings in the world dedicated to parking. Its demolition made it the tallest building in Ohio to be destroyed at the time.

== Reception and legacy ==
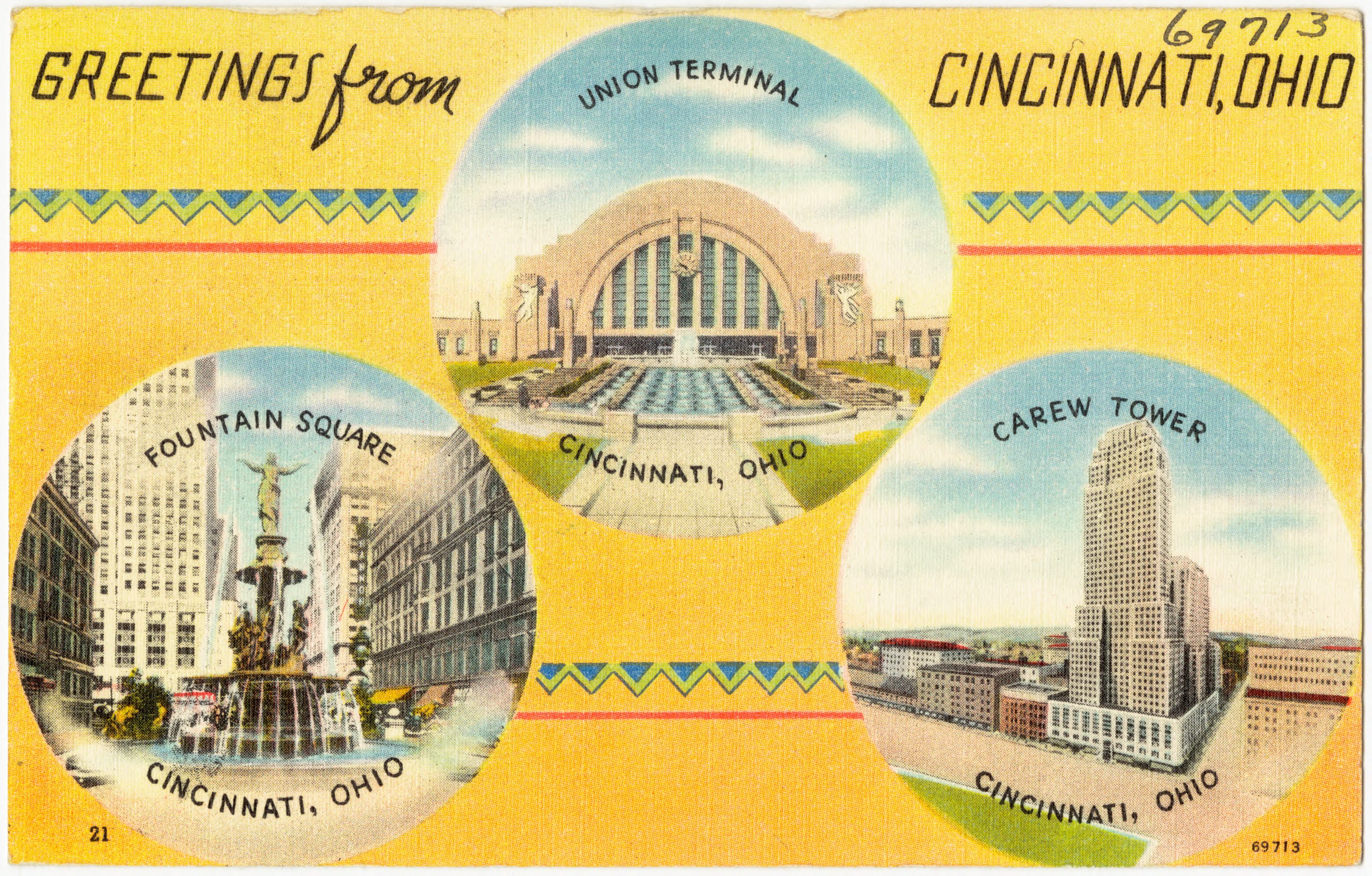
Postcard showing the Carew Tower as a Cincinnati landmark alongside Union Terminal and Fountain Square

The Carew Tower's mixed-use nature was innovative for its time. An April 1930 article in The Cincinnati Enquirer stated that the complex was “the first great building in America that has taken into consideration the supplementary aid a number of distinct projects housed in one large structure will give one another”. At its topping out ceremony in July 1930, Mayor of Cincinnati Russell Wilson praised the project for including “the latest features of multiple-use building”. In 1979, architectural critic Jayne Merkel referred to the complex as “50 years ahead of its time” for its mixed-use design, with the tower being “the key to a continuously healthy downtown”.

Construction of the Carew Tower took place during a period of civic reform in Cincinnati as the city moved away from an era of patronage and boss rule, and the project was regarded by many community figures as symbolic of the city's progress. Tower developer John J. Emery was a prominent supporter of political reform, serving as a high-ranking member of the Charter Committee. Stating that the Charter Committee's platform combined “the prewar Progressive tradition with the modern postwar gospel of business efficiency”, architectural historian Edward W. Wolner connected the building's mixed-use design with Charterite ideology. Wolner stated that the complex was “an unusual example in the 1920s of the congruence between progressive skyscraper design and planning on the one hand, and progressive social and political tendencies on the other”. The Carew Tower's civic importance was contemporaneously recognized by the Enquirer, which stated on August 25, 1929, that the project “takes on the measurements of a great civic undertaking” and “will give national impetus to the program of progress in Cincinnati”.

The Carew Tower and Netherland Plaza were added to the National Register of Historic Places as a single entity on August 5, 1982. In 1991, the Netherland Plaza became a member of Historic Hotels of America, the official program of the National Trust for Historic Preservation. The complex was designated a National Historic Landmark in 1994. The National Park Service referred to the complex as "one of the finest examples of skyscraper modernism in America" and "the most complete statement of the 1920s' Jazz Age, an embodiment of speed, high style, and a mass-market machine age".

In the years since its construction, prominent publications and political figures in Cincinnati have described the Carew Tower as one of the city's foremost landmarks and a symbol of the city itself. In 1943, The Cincinnati Post stated that the tower was a “[symbol] of Cincinnati's greatness”. The Enquirer has referred to the tower as “one of Cincinnati's most historic landmarks” and “an unmistakable icon in the city skyline”. In 2021, City Councilman David S. Mann described it as “a symbol of our core downtown”. In 2025, Councilman Evan Nolan stated that the tower “has come to symbolize the city”.

== See also ==
- List of tallest buildings in Cincinnati
- Chanin Building – Art Deco skyscraper in New York built around the same time
- Macy's Building – another Cincinnati skyscraper acquired by Victrix Investments LLC for residential conversion
