= Mabley =

Mabley is a surname. Notable people with the surname include:

- Moms Mabley (1894–1975), American comedian
- Jack Mabley (1915–2006), American reporter and columnist
- C. R. Mabley (1836–1885), Founder of chain of department stores in the United States

== See also ==
- Mabley and Carew, US Department store
- Mabley Developmental Center, Illinois state centre for mentally disabled, Dixon, Illinois
- Smith and Mabley, New York City automobile manufacturer
