= Sharrett =

Sharrett is a surname. Notable people with the surname include:

- Dave Sharrett II (1980–2008), United States Army soldier
- Michael Sharrett (born 1965), American actor

== See also ==
- Thaddeus S. Sharretts (1850–1926), American judge
- Starrett
