= Majestic Building (Detroit) =

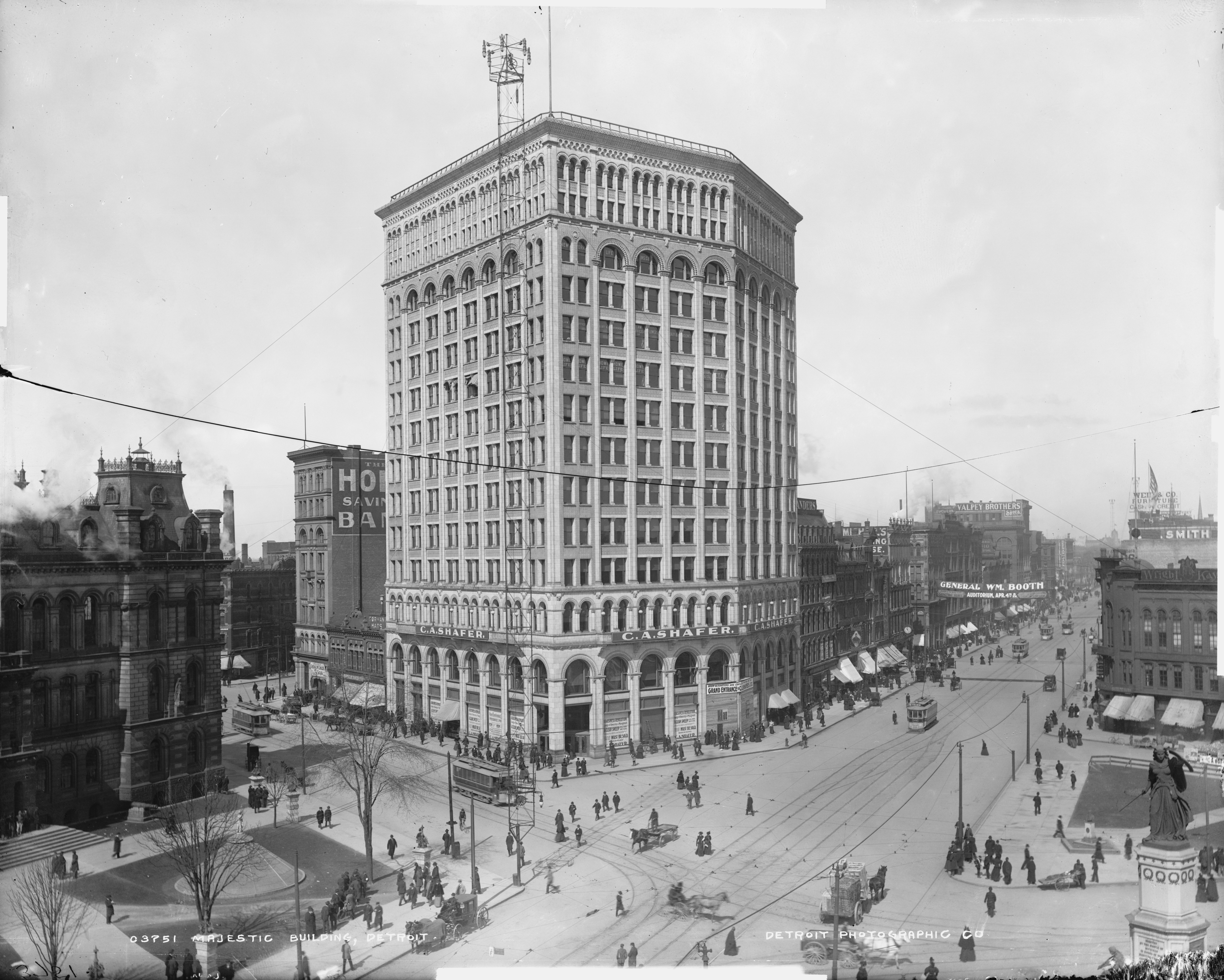
- Majestic Building, c. 1896–1899
- Interactive map of the Majestic Building area

General information
- Status: Demolished
- Type: Offices
- Location: 1001 Woodward Avenue; Detroit, Michigan
- Coordinates: 42.3317°N 83.0475°W
- Completed: 1896
- Demolished: 1962

Height
- Roof: 68 m (223 ft)

Technical details
- Floor count: 14

Design and construction
- Architect: Daniel H. Burnham

The Majestic Building was a high-rise building located at 1001 (Note: Detroit street addresses were renumbered starting January 1, 1921; the building's original address was 137 Woodward Avenue.) Woodward Avenue in Downtown Detroit, Michigan. The building was constructed in 1896 for the Mabley and Company department store chain and was the city's second skyscraper, following the completion of the Hammond Building. It contained 14 stories and stood at 68 m (223 ft) in height. This building was designed in the Beaux-Arts style by Daniel H. Burnham & Company, and faced with terra cotta. The final construction cost of the building was $1,000,000. This was Detroit's tallest building, from its completion in 1896 until 1909, when it was overtaken by the Ford Building. Unfortunately, C. R. Mabley died before the building's completion and new owners used it solely as an office block. It was purportedly renamed the Majestic building to conform with the letter "M" (for Mabley) carved in numerous places in its façade.

The Majestic Building was hailed as a "fireproof skyscraper" and this claim was proven in 1915 when a fire broke out on the top floor and burned for two hours. The fire never spread to other floors and never endangered the building's supporting structure.

Beginning in 1907, the Majestic Building housed offices and a rooftop observation deck for the United States Weather Bureau for science and meteorologists performing weather observations. This observation deck offered unobstructed views for up to 12 miles in any direction, and was open to the public for a dime admission.

The Detroit News engaged "The Human Fly" Harry H. Gardiner to scale the building's exterior in 1916 as a promotional stunt. The event was scheduled for the noon lunch hour and attracted such a large crowd, that traffic and streetcars on Woodward Avenue came to a halt.

The building was demolished in 1962, to make way for the First Federal Building, which was finished in 1965.
