= Paul Starrett =

American businessman (1866–1957)

Paul Starrett (1866–1957) was an American builder. In 1883, he graduated from Lake Forest Academy, an elite boarding school for boys which was part of the Lake Forest, Illinois, educational experiment. His brothers also graduated from this institution. As head of Starrett Brothers, Inc., in New York City, he was responsible for the construction of the Empire State Building, the Flatiron Building, and Penn Station, as well as the Plaza and Biltmore hotels. The Lincoln Memorial in Washington, D.C. was one of his many other projects.

His younger brother, William A. Starrett, an architect and project manager, was a prominent member of the firm.
