= Joseph T. Carew =

American department store owner (1848–1914)

Joseph Thomas Carew (1848-1914) was an American department store owner.

Carew was born in Peterboro, Canada West on January 2, 1848, the elder son of Robert Shapland Carew and Euphemia (Gordon) Carew, a well-to-do Irish family working for the British government in Canada. After school in Peterboro and Toronto he decided to move to America and became an American citizen, joining in 1869 the clothing firm of English immigrant C. R. Mabley. He quickly rose to be manager of the Detroit branch and was then offered by Mabley a partnership in a new store, for which Cincinnati was selected. He thus in 1877 became the manager and co-partner with Mabley of the successful business of Mabley & Carew and organised the construction of a new six storey department store at the corner of Fifth and Vine Streets. On Mabley's death in 1885 he became sole proprietor. He was very well known in Cincinnati, and was called "one of the ablest merchants Cincinnati has known".

He married on August 10, 1877 Alice E Stewart, daughter of a Detroit shipowner. They had two children, Robert and Elaine. Robert also worked for the store.

He was a prominent Freemason and active in public service and was presented with the "Golden Key of the City" by the Chamber of Commerce. He was appointed a Trustee of the Cincinnati Southern Railroad in 1905. He was a loyal Republican and a three time Presidential Elector from Ohio and chairman of the Ohio Electoral College.

He died at his home in Walnut Hills near Cincinnati on December 11, 1914 at the age of 65 and his cousin Bolton Stretch Armstrong took over as Company President. Joseph was buried in Spring Grove cemetery, his name perpetuated by one of Cincinnati's tallest buildings, the Carew Tower, built in 1931 over the site of his office block, the Carew Building.
