= Great American Tower at Queen City Square =

41-story skyscraper in Cincinnati, Ohio

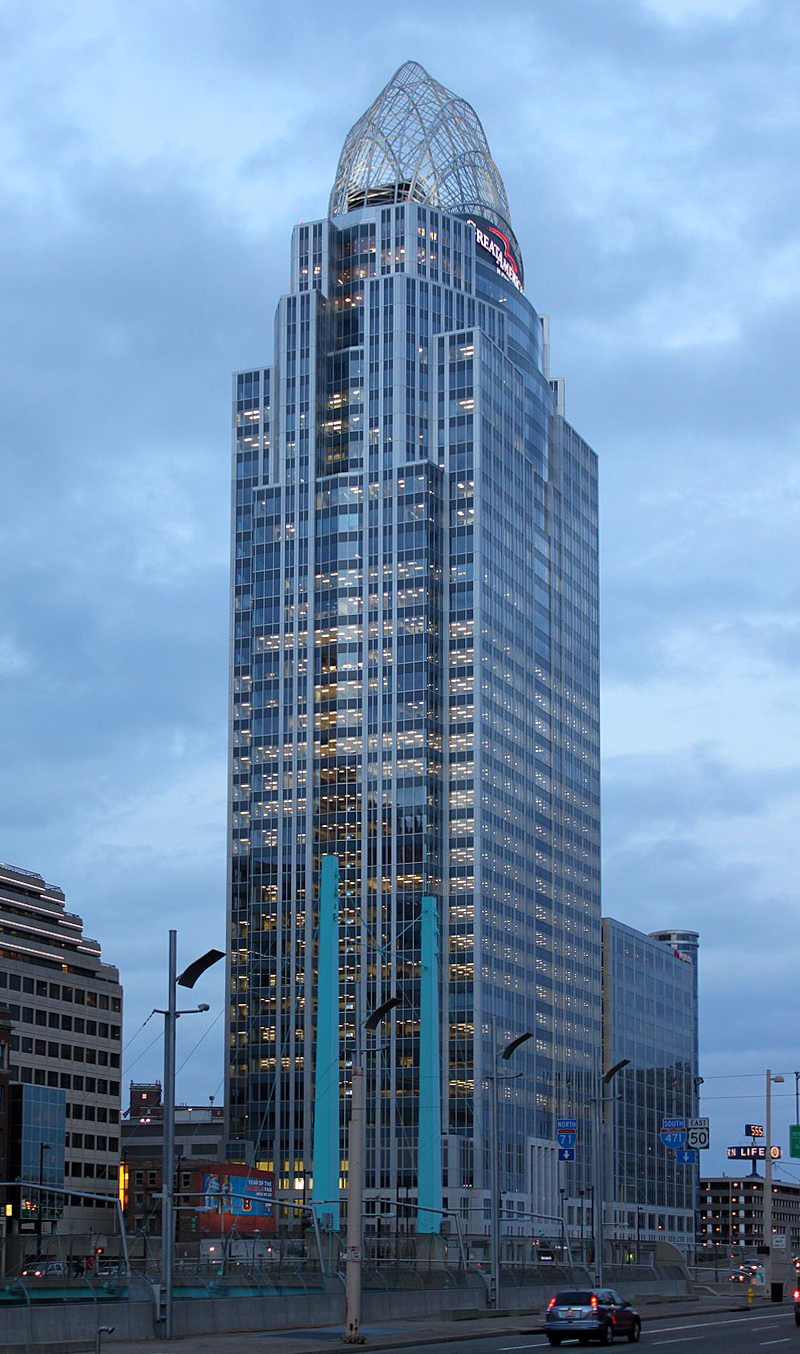
- Great American Tower in Downtown Cincinnati
- Alternative names: Queen City Square Phase II; Western Southern Life Tower

Record height
- Tallest in Cincinnati since 2011^{[I]}
- Preceded by: Carew Tower

General information
- Status: Completed
- Type: Commercial offices
- Architectural style: Postmodern
- Location: 301 East Fourth Street; Cincinnati, Ohio
- Coordinates: 39.09983°N 84.507185°W
- Construction started: November 2008
- Completed: January 2011
- Cost: US$322 million
- Owner: Eagle Realty Group (Western & Southern subsidiary)

Height
- Antenna spire: 202.7 m (665 ft)
- Roof: 151 m (495 ft)
- Top floor: 147 m (482 ft)

Technical details
- Floor count: 41 (no 13th floor); 3 underground
- Floor area: 74,322 m^{2} (800,000 sq ft)
- Lifts/elevators: 26

Design and construction
- Architect: Gyo Obata (Hellmuth, Obata and Kassabaum)
- Developer: Western & Southern Financial Group
- Main contractor: Turner Construction

Website
- www.queencitysquare.com/great-american-tower

The Great American Tower at Queen City Square is a 41-story, 667-foot-tall (203 m) skyscraper in Cincinnati, Ohio, which opened in January 2011. The tower was built by Western & Southern Financial Group at a cost of $322 million including $65 million of taxpayer-funded subsidies. Construction on the tower had begun in July 2008. Half of the building is occupied as the headquarters of the American Financial Group subsidiary, Great American Insurance Company. As of 2015, it is the third-tallest building in the state of Ohio, the tallest outside of Cleveland, and the tallest building in Cincinnati.

== Background ==
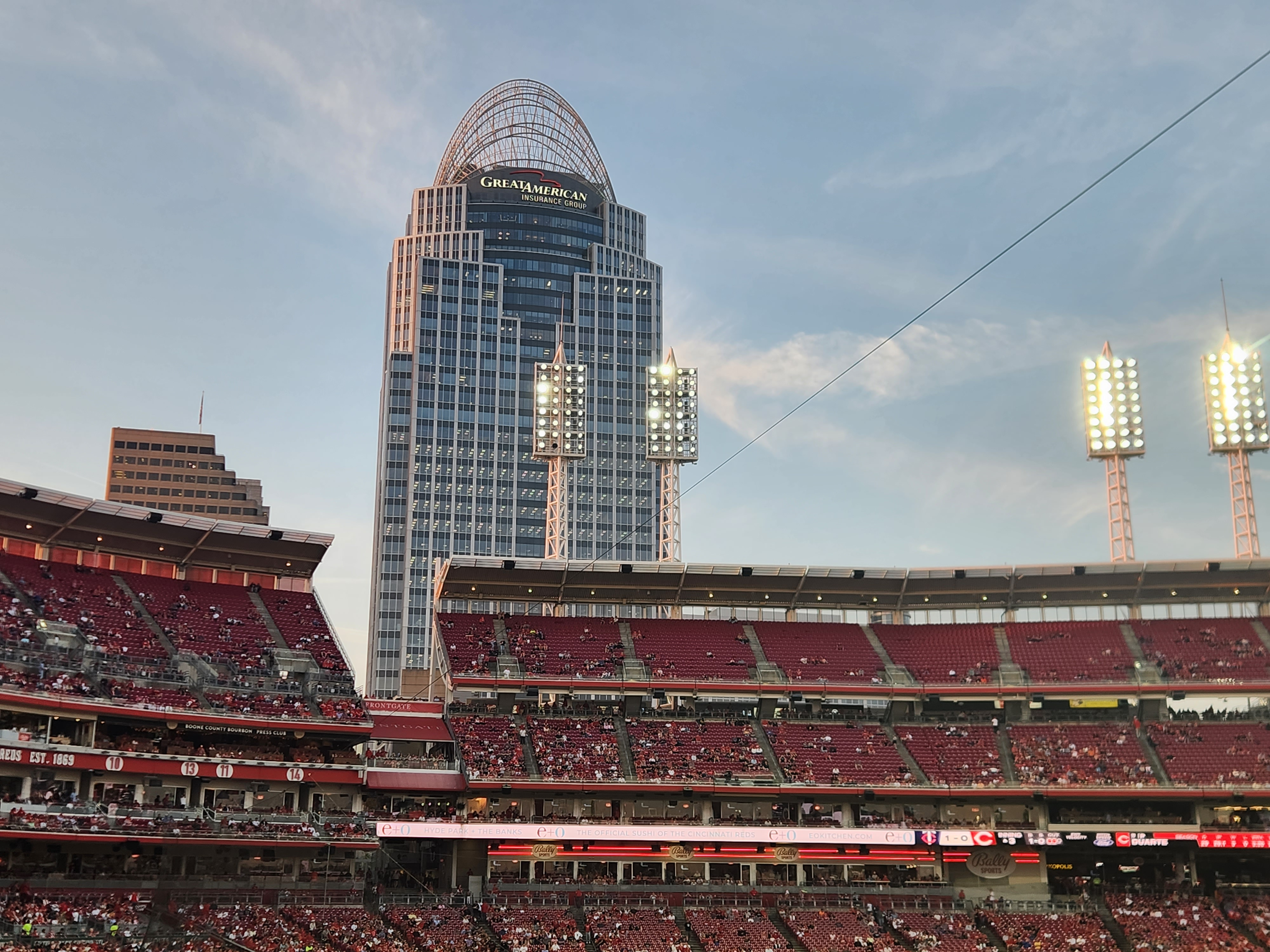
Great American Insurance Group skyscraper from Great American Ball Park

Western & Southern had promoted the idea of constructing a tower for 20 years following the last construction boom in downtown Cincinnati. In 2002, the project was revived. Plans called for a tower with over 800,000 sq ft (74,000 m^{2}) of office space. When the tower opened in 2011, it was 660 ft (200 m), ending the Carew Tower's 81-year reign as the tallest building in Cincinnati. While the Great American Tower is 91 ft (28 m) taller than the Carew Tower, the latter building's roof is 79 ft (24 m) taller than the roof of the Great American Tower. The building was reviewed and approved by the Port of Greater Cincinnati Development Authority which determined whether its parameters conformed to the outline in the Cincinnati 2000 plan for downtown including a final approval by Cincinnati City Council on May 30, 2014. Due to Cincinnati's relatively low cost of living, it was the only American skyscraper constructed during the Great Recession.

Tenants include American Financial Group, law firms Frost Brown Todd and Vorys, Sater, Seymour and Pease, along with the property's owner-developer Western & Southern Financial Group. The majority of Western & Southern's space is located in the 303 Broadway portion of the complex. With its name incorporating the mantra "Queen City," other structures in the area, like Christ Church Cathedral, are often referred to as being at Queen City Square as well.

== Design ==
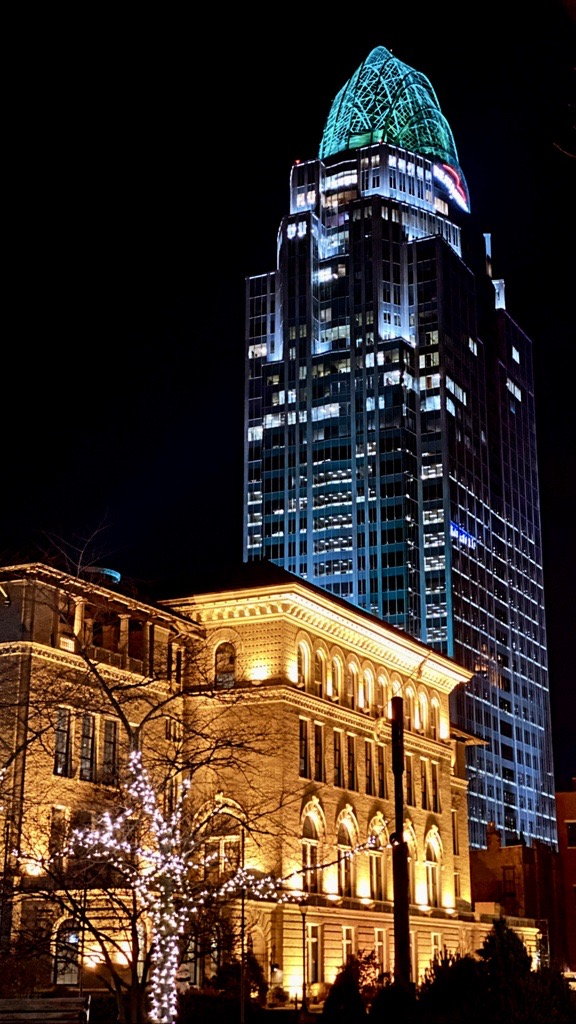
The Great American tower lit in green during Christmas

The building's architect, Gyo Obata, designed the building to include a top inspired by Diana, Princess of Wales's tiara. Gyo was flipping through books when he came upon a picture of Diana wearing a crown. "That's perfect. Here we have the crown of the building, and the nickname for the city is Queen City," exclaimed Joe Robertson of Hellmuth, Obata and Kassabaum remarking to Gyo when he first saw the picture. The building is faced with glass and aluminum. The ground floor lobby interiors were designed by FRCH Design Worldwide. It has met with approval from Sue Ann Painter, author of Architecture in Cincinnati (Ohio University Press, 2006), who believes the skyscraper's headdress recalls the iconic Chrysler Building. She says that the building is somewhat conservative, but pays homage to the other skyscrapers in Cincinnati. Jay Chatterjee, a former dean of the University of Cincinnati College of Design, Architecture, Art, and Planning says that the design is similar to buildings constructed in the United States during the 1980s, that it does not break any new ground at all.
