= C. R. Mabley =

British founder of a chain of department stores in United States

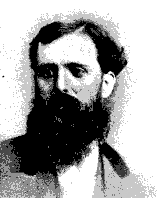
C. R. Mabley

Christopher Richards Mabley (1836–1885) was the founder of a chain of department stores in United States. He was known as "The Merchant Prince".

Mabley was born on Feb 22, 1836, in St Minver, Cornwall, England to William and Mary née Richards Mabley. He married Katherine Morice Hull (with whom he had 10 children, 5 of which were surviving as of 1886) and in 1856-1858 emigrated via Toronto (where his father set up as a silk merchant) to Milwaukee, WIsconsin.

There he opened a chain of clothing stores (known as Mabley & Co) across Michigan (Pontiac, Ionia, Flint, Detroit), Illinois and Ohio (Toledo, Cleveland) which were so successful that he was soon able to commission the tallest building in Detroit (14 floors) as his flagship store but died in 1885 before it could be completed. The building was renamed the Majestic Building by a new owner because of the many letter Ms (for Mabley) carved into the stonework.

The final store, in Cincinnati, was named Mabley and Carew and was jointly owned with Joseph Carew. Joseph T. Carew had been one of Mabley's managers and later his business partner and managed the Cincinnati store.

Mabley delighted in the out-door life, belonging to the old Detroit Boat Club and the St. Clair Pishing Club. In politics he was a Democrat, but was very broad in his views, voting for the best man regardless of party affiliations. He would never accept public office, although several times approached with a request to accept the nomination for mayor. He was a valued member of the Universalist church.

After his early death on June 30, 1885, he was interred with his early children in the family vault in Oak Hill Cemetery, Pontiac which in 2002 was sadly vandalized by a local man using it as a lockup. His only surviving son Carleton Raymond Mabley co-founded the Smith and Mabley auto manufacturing company of New York City.
