= Mabley & Carew =

Department store in Cincinnati, Ohio

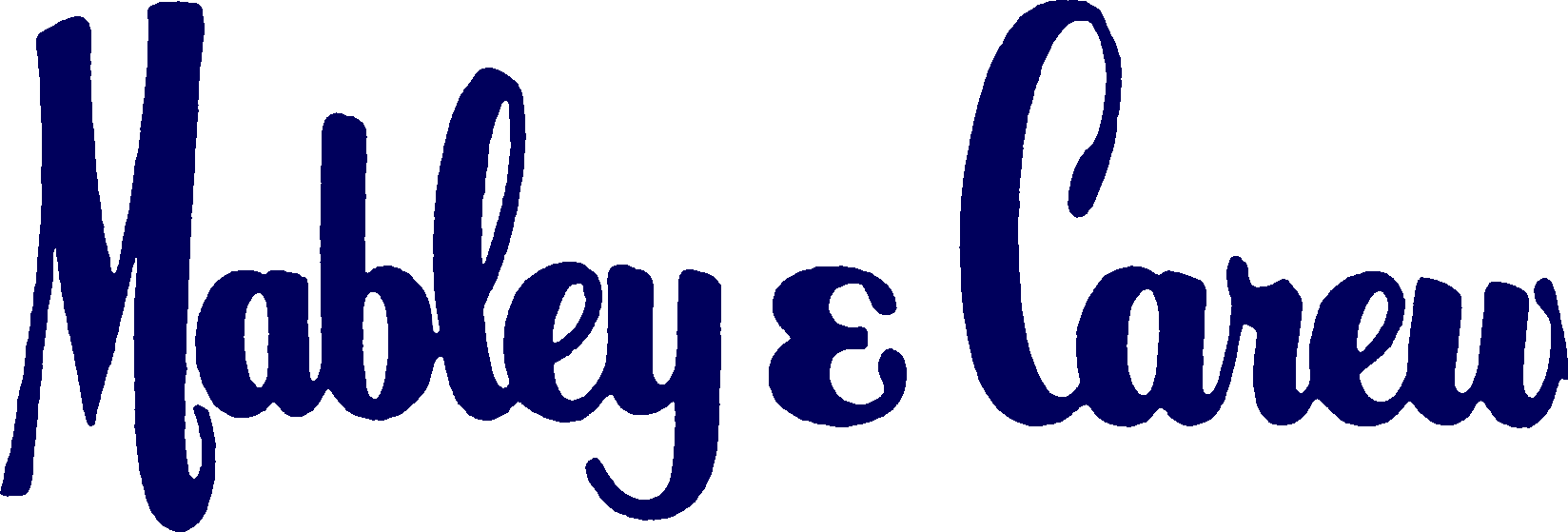

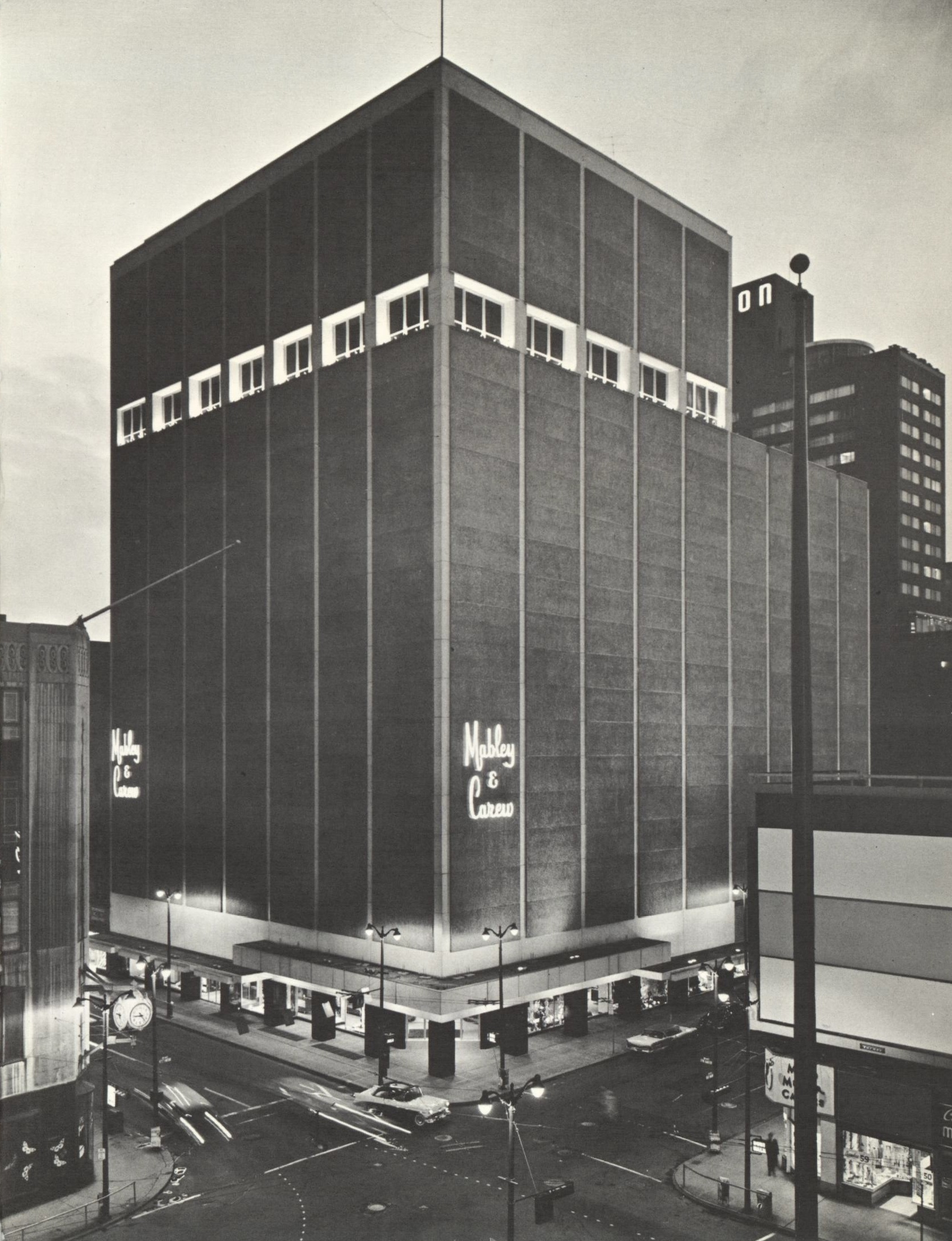
- Company type: Department store
- Industry: Retail
- Founded: 1877
- Defunct: 1978
- Fate: Purchased by Allied Stores Corporation in 1961 and consolidated with Allied-owned Rollman & Sons Department Store; Purchased by Elder-Beerman in 1978
- Headquarters: Cincinnati, Ohio
- Products: Clothing, footwear, bedding, furniture, jewelry, beauty products, housewares
- Parent: Allied Stores Corporation

Mabley & Carew was a prominent department store in Cincinnati, Ohio.

== History ==
The store traced its roots to 1877, when Detroit merchants C. R. Mabley and Joseph T. Carew, en route to Memphis, were stranded in Cincinnati by a late train and wound up going into business in the heart of what was then a booming river city. Having missed their connection, they walked around town and reached Fountain Square, saw a "For Rent" sign, and decided that was a fine place for a store. Mabley & Carew was the first store in Cincinnati to adopt full-page newspaper ads, to give elaborate Christmas performances, and to set up the Arbor Day custom. The Mabley & Carew building was once illuminated by 10,000 lights that glimmered opposite Fountain Square.

The company was owned by a joint partnership of Messrs Mabley and Carew but managed by Carew. After Mabley's death in 1885, Carew became sole owner of the business. Carew died in 1914 and was succeeded as company president by his first cousin Bolton Stretch Armstrong, who ran the company for the next 37 years.

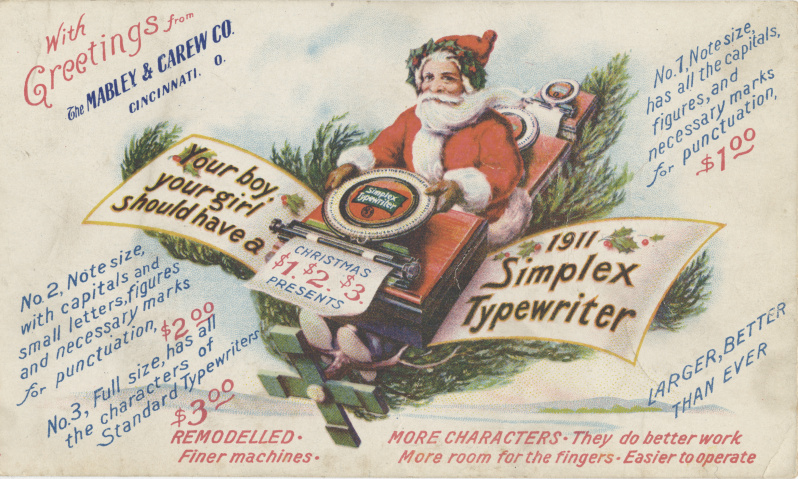
Mabley and Carew marketing material (ca 1898)

In 1929 the Carew Building, a nearby office block also built by Carew, was demolished and replaced by Cincinnati's landmark Carew Tower, completed in 1930 after 17 months' work. This complex was the home to the flagship Mabley & Carew department store from 1930 to 1960, until the business was purchased by Allied Stores and consolidated with its Rollman and Sons Department Store (aka Rollman's) division, an existing founding division of Allied. The Rollman's branch store at Swifton Center immediately became a Mabley and Carew branch, however the Rollman's flagship store was closed and extensively renovated. By 1962 Mabley & Carew had moved its store across the street into the Rollman's building, renamed the Mabley and Carew Building. At the time of the merger, Mabley & Carew also had a branch store at Cincinnati's Western Hills Plaza that had opened in 1955.

By 1964, Mabley & Carew was also consolidated with the former E. C. Denton Stores Co. stores acquired by Allied in 1952. Both the Robinson-Schwenn Department Store in nearby Hamilton, Ohio and the John Ross Store in Middletown, Ohio were converted to Mabley & Carew branch stores. The Wren's Department Store in Springfield, Ohio, another former Denton store, retained its name but some administrative functions were performed by other Allied divisions.

In 1978, Dayton, Ohio-based Elder-Beerman purchased what were then six Mabley & Carew stores in Cincinnati, Hamilton and Middletown and eventually converted them to the Elder-Beerman nameplate. Wren's Department Store in Springfield was not included in the sale and became part of Allied's William H. Block Co. Department Store division based in Indianapolis, Indiana. The old Rollman's building was eventually closed and torn down in 1991 to make way for a proposed, but not ever built, new tallest building in Cincinnati, Fountain Square West. This site is now occupied by a vacant New York-based Macy's store slated for mixed-use redevelopment as of 2021.
