= Starrett Corporation =

Real estate development and construction firm

Starrett Corporation, formerly known as Starrett Brothers, Inc. and Starrett Brothers and Eken, is a real estate development and construction firm known for having built the Empire State Building, Stuyvesant Town, Starrett City and Trump Tower in New York City.

== History ==
Founded in 1922 (104 years ago) and incorporated in Dover, Delaware, in February 1929, the company's initial capitalization was 1,500,000 shares of stock of no par value. Incorporators were Alfred G. Mueller, Alfred W. Boser, and Atlee W. Estarbrook, of New York City. With its subsidiaries the business had a total capitalization of approximately $40,000,000. Starrett Corporation acquired all of the capital stock of Starrett Brothers, a building company. Starrett Corporation was involved in construction and financing of buildings in the major urban centers of the United States. Paul Starrett became chairman of the board and William A. Starrett served as president and a director.

In 1963, Robert Olnick became president and shifted the focus to building low and middle income housing which did not require financing as they were funded by the government. In 1970, Henry Benach purchased a quarter of the company's stock and became president. He renamed the company Starrett Housing Corporation. In 1977, Starrett purchased H.R.H. Construction (founded by Saul Horowitz in 1925) which became a subsidiary. In 1978, Starrett acquired Levitt Corporation (founded by Abraham Levitt in 1938) from the ITT Corporation. In 1995, the company was renamed Starrett Corporation.

In June 1997, Jacob Frydman, attempted to purchase the company for $84 million, $12.25 per share, after reaching an agreement with brothers Paul Milstein and Seymour Milstein who owned 33% of Starrett's shares and president Henry Benach who owned 19% of Starrett's shares. In October 1997 Mr. Paul Milstein, Chairman of Starrett announced that the company was being sold to affiliates of Manhattan-based Lawrence Ruben Co., Blackacre Capital Group, Amroc Investments and Argent Ventures.

A few months after the closing of the acquisition of Starrett by Lawrence Ruben Co., Blackacre Capital Group, Amroc Investments and Argent Ventures, the company announced that Joel Simon, a former executive of Olympia & York Companies (U.S.A.), will become its new chief executive office

== Subsidiaries ==
One subsidiary, the Starrett Building Company of Chicago, Illinois, erected the steel girders on the National Parking Garage in Chicago, in 1929. Two other subsidiaries were the Starrett Investing Corporation and the Wall and Hanover Streets Realty Company. The latter subsidiary owned the thirty-five story Wall and Hanover Building at 59 - 63 Wall Street, Manhattan.

Starrett Corporation's subsidiaries also include the Levitt Corporation, which built tract housing following World War II. More recently the company maintained a successful home building business in Puerto Rico and Florida.
