= William A. Starrett =

American builder (1877–1932)

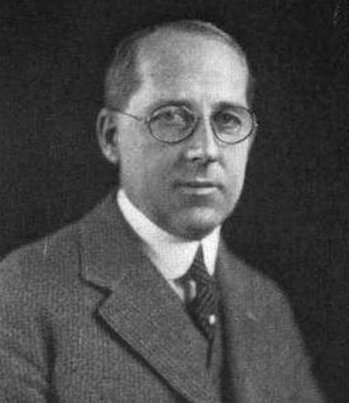
- Born: William Aiken Starrett; June 14, 1877; Lawrence, Kansas, U.S.
- Died: March 25, 1932 (aged 54); Madison, New Jersey, U.S.
- Education: University of Michigan
- Occupation: Builder
- Known for: Building skyscrapers; Starrett Corporation
- Notable work: Empire State Building

William Aiken Starrett Jr. (June 14, 1877 – March 25, 1932) was an American builder and architect, best known for his work overseeing the construction of New York City's Empire State Building.

== Biography ==
He was born on June 14, 1877, in Lawrence, Kansas. He left the University of Michigan in 1895 after two years and finally received a bachelor's degree in civil engineering two decades later. He married the former Eloise Gedney on June 14, 1900.

In Skyscrapers and the Men Who Build Them, he described the construction of skyscrapers as "the nearest peacetime equivalent of war". On behalf of Starrett Brothers and Eken, the general contractor on the construction of the Empire State Building, Starrett oversaw the demolition of the Waldorf-Astoria Hotel and the completion of the Empire State Building on May 1, 1931, a total of 410 days.

He died on March 25, 1932, at his home in Madison, New Jersey, as the result of a stroke. A Republican, he had served as the borough's mayor from 1920 to 1921.
