= 110 N. Main Street =

Office tower located in downtown Dayton, Ohio, United States

Coordinates: 39.761426°N 84.191880°W

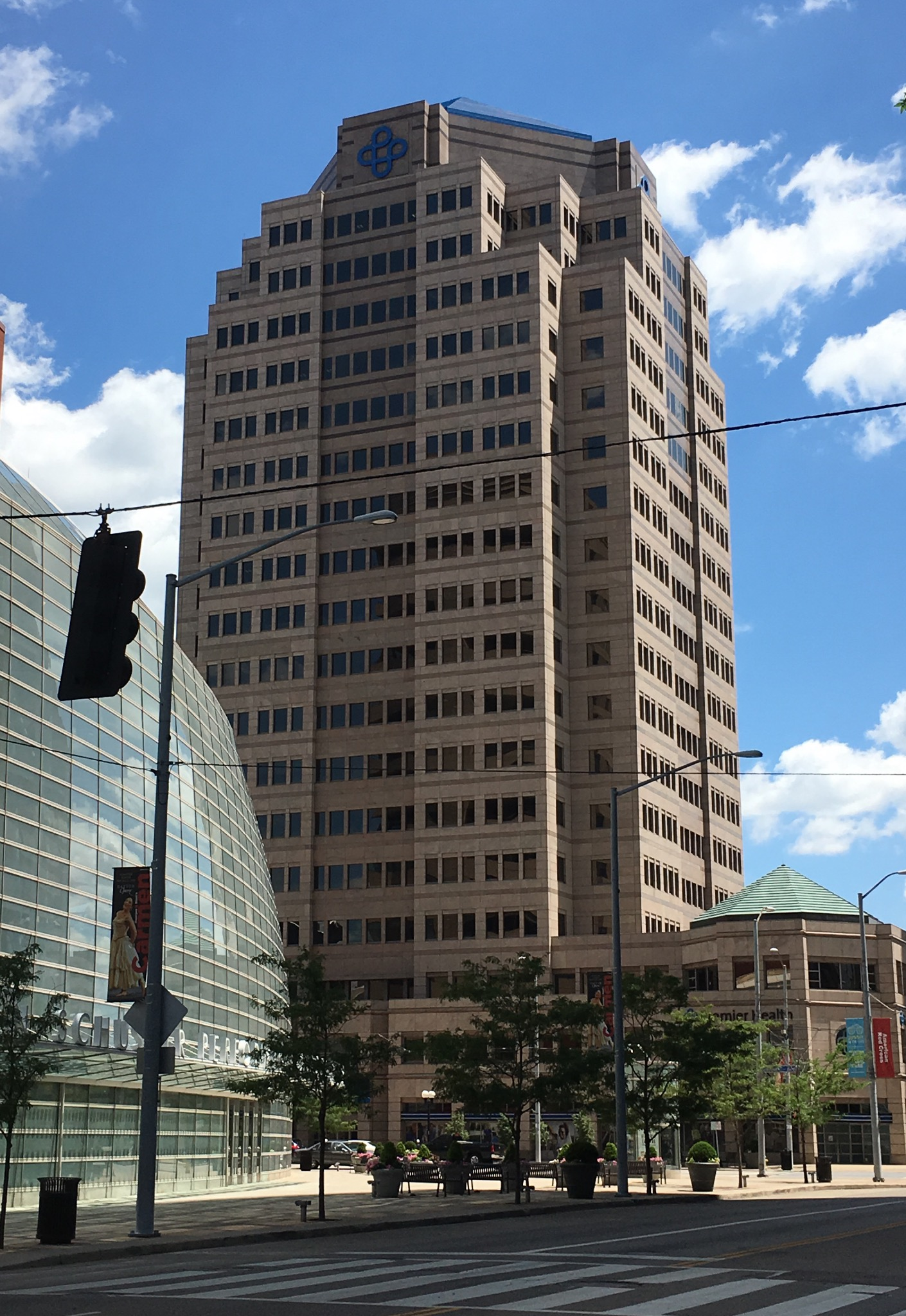
- Interactive map of the 110 N. Main Street area

General information
- Status: Completed
- Type: Office
- Location: 110 North Main Street, Dayton, Ohio, United States
- Completed: 1989

Height
- Roof: 328 ft (100 m)

Technical details
- Floor count: 20

Design and construction
- Architects: Lorenz + Williams, Inc.

110 N. Main Street is an office tower located in downtown Dayton, Ohio, United States. The building is 328 ft (100 m) tall and has 20 floors.

Opening in 1989 as Citizens Federal Centre, the building was later named Fifth Third Center before Fifth Third Bank moved to the One Dayton Centre in 2009. In 2011, Premier Health Partners acquired the building for $6.19 million. It is currently their headquarters.

== See also ==
- List of tallest buildings in Dayton
