= List of tallest buildings in Dayton =

Skyline of Dayton
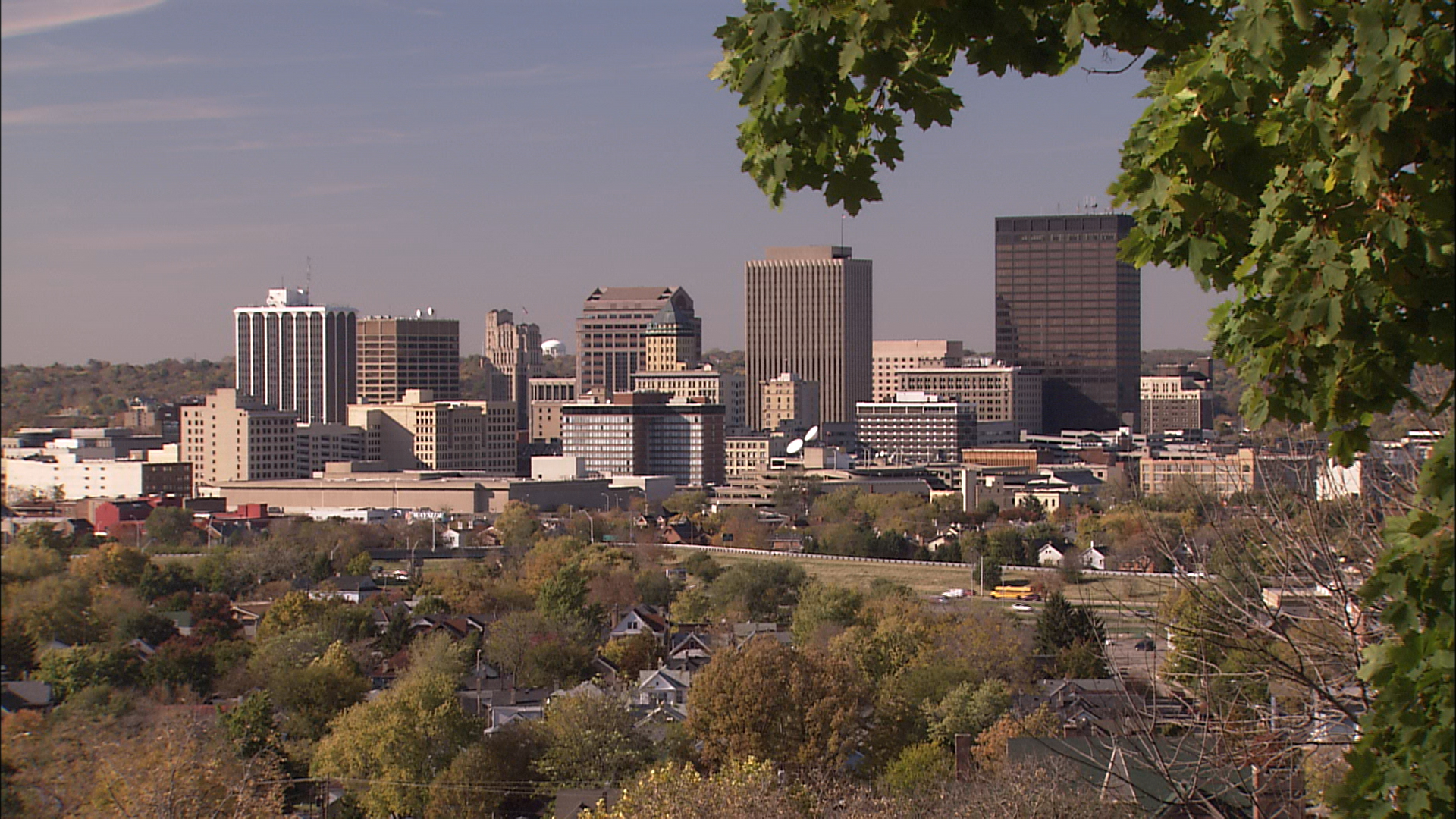
- Dayton in 2007
- Tallest building: Stratacache Tower (1970)
- Tallest building height: 405 ft (123 m)

Number of tall buildings
- Taller than 50 m (164 ft): 20
- Taller than 100 m (328 ft): 5

Number of tall buildings — feet
- Taller than 200 ft (61.0 m): 12
- Taller than 300 ft (91.4 m): 5

The history of high-rises in the United States city of Dayton, Ohio, began in 1896 with the construction of the Reibold Building. Although the Reibold Building was Dayton's first high-rise, the Centre City Building is often regarded as the first "skyscraper" in the city and was completed in 1924. The original portion of the building opened in 1904, when the tower portion was completed two decades later, it was one of the tallest reinforced concrete buildings in the world, and the tallest in the United States. Dayton went through an early building boom in the late 1920s, during which several high-rise buildings, including the Key Bank Building, were constructed. The city experienced a second, much larger building boom that lasted from the early 1970s to late 1980s. During this time, Dayton saw the construction of six skyscrapers, including the Stratacache Tower, also known as the Kettering Tower, and KeyBank Tower.

The two tallest buildings of the Dayton skyline are Stratacache Tower at 408 ft (124 m) and the KeyBank Tower at 385 ft (117 m). Stratacache Tower was formally Kettering Tower (named for Virginia Kettering), and was originally Winters Tower, the headquarters of Winters Bank, and the building was renamed when Winters merged with Bank One. KeyBank Tower was formerly known as the MeadWestvaco Tower before KeyBank gained naming rights to the building in 2008. Dayton is the site of five skyscrapers that rise at least 328 ft (100 m) in height. The most recently completed high-rise in the city is the Miami Valley Hospital Southeast Tower, which was constructed in 2010 and rises 246 ft (75 m).

== Cityscape ==
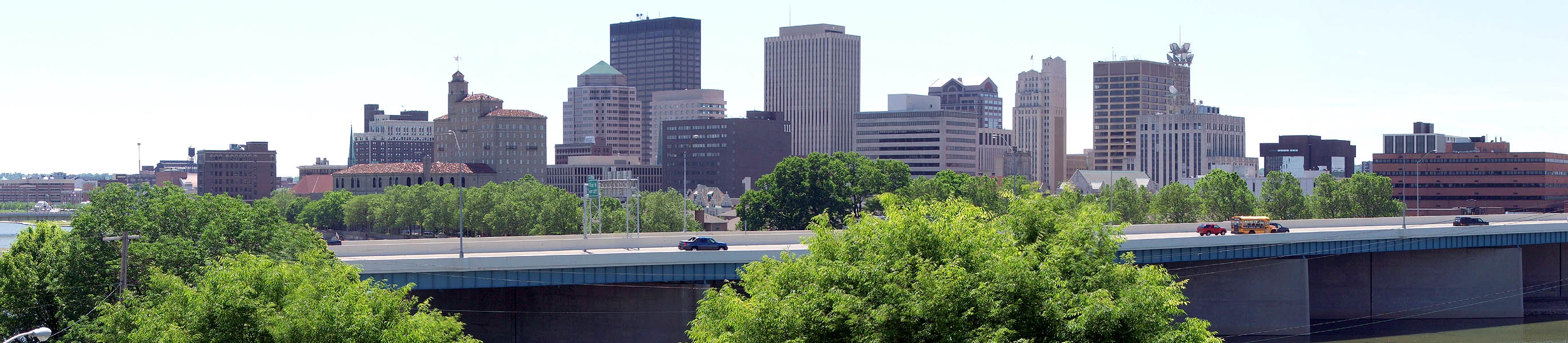
Panorama of Dayton

== Tallest buildings ==
This list ranks Dayton buildings that stand at least 150 feet (46 m) tall to limit exhaustiveness and based on standard height measurement. This includes spires and architectural details but does not include antenna masts. An equal sign (=) following a rank indicates the same height between two or more buildings. The "Year" column indicates the year in which a building was completed.

Rank	Name	Image	Street address	Height ft (m)	Floors	Year	Notes	Ref(s)
1	Stratacache Tower		40 N. Main Street	405 (123)	30	1970	Known as Winters Tower until the merger of Winters Bank with BankOne. Known as Kettering Tower until its purchase by Stratacache. Dayton's tallest building.	
2	KeyBank Tower		10 W. Second Street	385 (117)	28	1976	Previously the headquarters of the paper products company MeadWestvaco before it relocated to Stamford, Connecticut in 2001. Renamed KeyBank Tower in 2009.	
3	Fifth Third Center		1 S. Main Street	336 (102)	20	1989	The building was once known as One Dayton Centre until Fifth Third Bank became the prime tenant in 2009.	
4	Grant-Deneau Tower		40 W. Fourth Street	331 (101)	22	1969	This was the tallest building in Dayton for about a year until the Kettering Tower claimed this designation in 1970.	
5	110 N. Main Street		110 North Main Street	328 (100)	20	1989	Originally known as Citizens Federal Centre, later as Fifth Third Center (until the company moved to the One Dayton Centre in 2009). In 2011, Premier Health Partners acquired the building for $6.19 million.	
6	Liberty Tower		120 W. Second Street	295 (90)	23	1931	Liberty Tower, originally known as Mutual Home Savings Association Building, was the tallest building in Dayton from 1931 to 1969. At one point, it was known as the Hulman Building, during the time it was the property of the owners of the Indianapolis Motor Speedway — the Hulman Family of Terre Haute, Indiana.	
7	130 Building		130 W. Second Street	290 (88)	21	1972	—	
8	Centre City Building		40 S. Main Street	274 (84)	21	1904	The original portion of this building was completed in 1904. It was then known as the United Brethren Building. Construction of a tower portion began years later and upon completion in 1924 it became the tallest reinforced concrete building in the United States and one of the tallest in the world.	
9	Landing Apartments		115 W. Monument Avenue	251 (77)	13	1929	This building became the new central branch of the Dayton YMCA in 1929. It replaced a building located several blocks south that was converted into Dayton City Hall. The Dayton YMCA sold it in 1988, and in the same year the facility was listed on the National Register of Historic Places. The building is a 13-story tower that runs east-to-west, and has two 12-story wings projecting to the south over a 2-story base. It became a Spanish Revival building in downtown Dayton when completed.	
10	Miami Valley Hospital Southeast Tower		45 Wyoming Street	246 (75)	12	2010	—	
11	Performance Place		109 N. Main Street	224 (68)	17	2003	A 17-floor office and condominium tower connected to the Schuster Performing Arts Center. The first eight floors of the tower contain office and restaurant space, and the next eight contain 32 condominia.	
12	Talbott Tower		131 N. Ludlow Street	203 (62)	14	1958	The building was the headquarters of the former Mead Corporation until it relocated in 1976.	
13	Montgomery County Administration Building		451 W. Third Street	196 (60)	12	1972	—	
14	Biltmore Towers		210 N. Main Street	182 (55)	16	1929	The former Biltmore Hotel was redeveloped into elderly housing in 1981.	
15=	Wright Stop Plaza (Conover Building)		4 S. Main Street	175 (53)	14	1901	Originally known as the Conover Building, and is listed on the National Register of Historic Places under that name. The bottom floor of this building is the main headquarters and hub for the Greater Dayton Regional Transit Authority.	
15=	AT&T Building		215 W. Second Street	175 (53)	11	1930	The large communications antennae atop the former Ohio Bell Building is not included in the height.	
16	Wilkinson Plaza		126 W. Fifth Street	168 (51)	14	1974	—	
17	Courthouse Plaza SW		10 N. Ludlow Street	167 (51)	12	1978	—	
18	CareSource Building		203 N. Main Street	162 (49)	9	2008	Steele High School, Dayton's first high school building, stood here until the late 1940s. The building is currently the headquarters of CareSource Management Group.	
19	Paru Tower		34 N. Main Street	161 (49)	14	1924	Formerly known as the KeyBank Building.	
20	Reibold Building		117 S. Main Street	155 (47)	11	1896	The Reibold Building was constructed in three phases. The center section was constructed in 1896, the South annex in 1904, and the North annex in 1914. The Reibold Building was Dayton's tallest for nearly a decade until the Centre City Building was completed.	

== Timeline of tallest buildings ==
This lists buildings that once held the title of tallest building in Dayton.

Building name	Street address	Height feet (meters)	Floors	Built
Reibold Building	117 S. Main Street	155 (47)	11	1896
Conover Building (Wright Stop Plaza)	4 S. Main Street	175 (53)	14	1901
Centre City Building	40 S. Main Street	274 (84)	21	1904
Liberty Tower	120 W. Second Street	295 (90)	23	1931
Grant-Deneau Tower	40 W. Fourth Street	331 (101)	22	1969
Stratacache Tower	40 N. Main Street	405 (123)	30	1971

== See also ==
- List of tallest buildings in Ohio
- List of tallest buildings in Cleveland
- List of tallest buildings in Columbus
- List of tallest buildings in Akron
- List of tallest buildings in Toledo, Ohio
