= Dovetail Project =

Non-profit organization

The Dovetail Project
- Dovetail Project Logo
- Formation: 2009
- Headquarters: 7300 S. Cottage Grove, Chicago, IL 60619
- Leader: Sheldon Smith
- Website: https://thedovetailproject.org/

The Dovetail Project is a non-profit organization that provides black and brown fathers ages 17 to 24 in Chicago with a 12-week curriculum that teaches skills like understanding their rights when engaged with law enforcement, financial literacy, and job and parenting skills. The organization is located in the Southwest side of Chicago, Illinois, and was founded in 2010 by Sheldon Smith. The organization also runs the fatherhood relief fund. This fund was started in 2020 and delivers items such as food, diapers, formula, and other useful home items through giveaway events. The non-profit gets financial support from family and private foundations, leading to them making around $720K in funding in 2022. The project has also been supported by numerous notable groups and figures ranging from Nike to Fifth Third Bank.

== History ==
Sheldon Smith was 21 when he started this project, stating that its goal is to provide black and brown fathers with skills to be better fathers, men, and members of their community. Smith created this organization due to both of his parents being teenagers when they had him and because his father was in and out of his life as he grew up. He wanted to create something to support young fathers ages 17 to 24.

== Fatherhood Relief Fund ==
The fatherhood relief fund is an effort that the organization started at the beginning of April 2020 during COVID-19. It provides fathers access to essentials that they and their families need. From April 2020 to 2022 the relief fund has helped over 10,100 families and continues to hold events.

== Educational program ==
Dovetail's curriculum spans 12 weeks with students comprising black and brown fathers aged 17–24. The organization recruits participants for the program through their outreach team. Within this program, students are taught childcare and parenting skills along with financial literacy. The three areas the program focuses on are parenting skills, life skills, and felony street laws. Through initiatives, participants are enrolled in either a GED examination, a trade program and / or they receive job training through one of Dovetail's partners. This is done concurrently with the program and completed after graduation from the program. During the program students also receive a bus pass and refreshments. For a year after the program's completion, the program's case-management team will provide follow-up support to its graduates.

== Notable contributors ==
The Dovetail Project has received support from a number of sponsors and donors. Some of the notable ones include:

1. The Chicago Bulls: The Chicago Bulls organization has partnered with the Dovetail Project to support their work in providing resources and support to young fathers in Chicago.
2. The Chicago Bears: The Chicago Bears organization has supported the Dovetail Project through fundraising events and donations.
3. BlueCross BlueShield of Illinois: The BlueCross BlueShield group has introduced new partners, supported the Fatherhood Relief Fund, helped expand relief efforts, and invested over $350,000 in Dovetails infrastructure.
4. Paul M. Angell Family Foundation: Paul M. Angell Family Foundation makes social causes grants in the areas of education, economic empowerment, and equity. Since 2019, the Foundation has supported Dovetail, and in 2021, it donated up to $225,000.
5. The Polk Bros. Foundation: The Polk Bros. Foundation has provided funding to the Dovetail Project to support their programs and services.
6. The Dovetail Project was selected for the University of Chicago's Community Programs Accelerator in 2014. Through this they provided Dovetail with grant funding and resources of the university such as work space and technical assistance.
7. Joseph and Jessie Feinburg Foundation: The Feinburg Foundation donated $300,000 to celebrate Black History Month in 2023 and has been a sponsor since 2019.
