= Suburban Trust and Savings Bank Building =

Bank building in Oak Park, Illinois

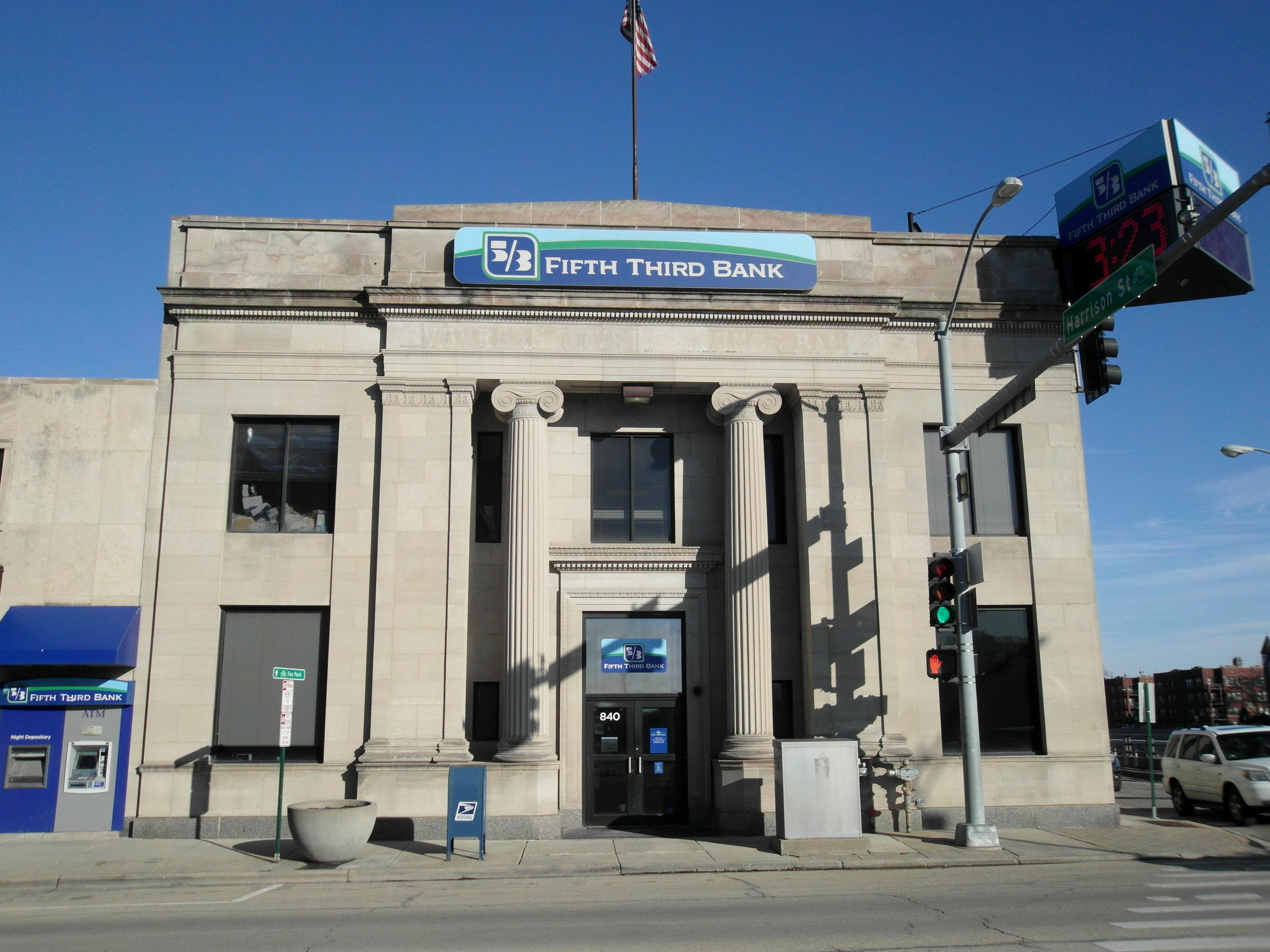

General information
- Architectural style: Greek Revival
- Location: 840 S. Oak Park Avenue, Oak Park, Illinois
- Coordinates: 41°52′22.34″N 87°47′37.61″W
- Completed: 1925-1928
- Opened: May 1, 1926

Technical details
- Floor count: 2

The Suburban Trust and Savings Bank Building is a bank building at 840 S. Oak Park Avenue, Oak Park, Illinois. It was built in two stages, with the first portion of the building being built in 1925 and opening on May 1, 1926. The front portion of the building was built later and opened on March 31, 1928. It replaced Suburban Trust and Savings Bank Building's previous building which was across the street and had opened fourteen years earlier. The building has also housed medical offices.

== History ==
Suburban Trust and Savings Bank first opened April 4, 1912. Work began on the new Suburban Trust and Savings Bank Building in June 1925. It was constructed at a cost of $250,000. On May 1, 1926, the bank moved to its newly built building at 840 S. Oak Park Avenue, and on March 31, 1928, the newly built front portion of the building was opened. An addition was built to the north of the building, which opened in July 1957.

In 1974, Suburban Trust and Savings Bank was purchased by American National Bank of Chicago. The following year, Suburban Trust and Savings Bank was sold to a group of investors headed by Denis P. Daly. On January 6, 1995, the bank was sold to Pinnacle Banc Group Inc for $23.4 million. The building currently houses a branch of Fifth Third Bank.
