= Reibold Building =

Commercial building in Ohio, United States

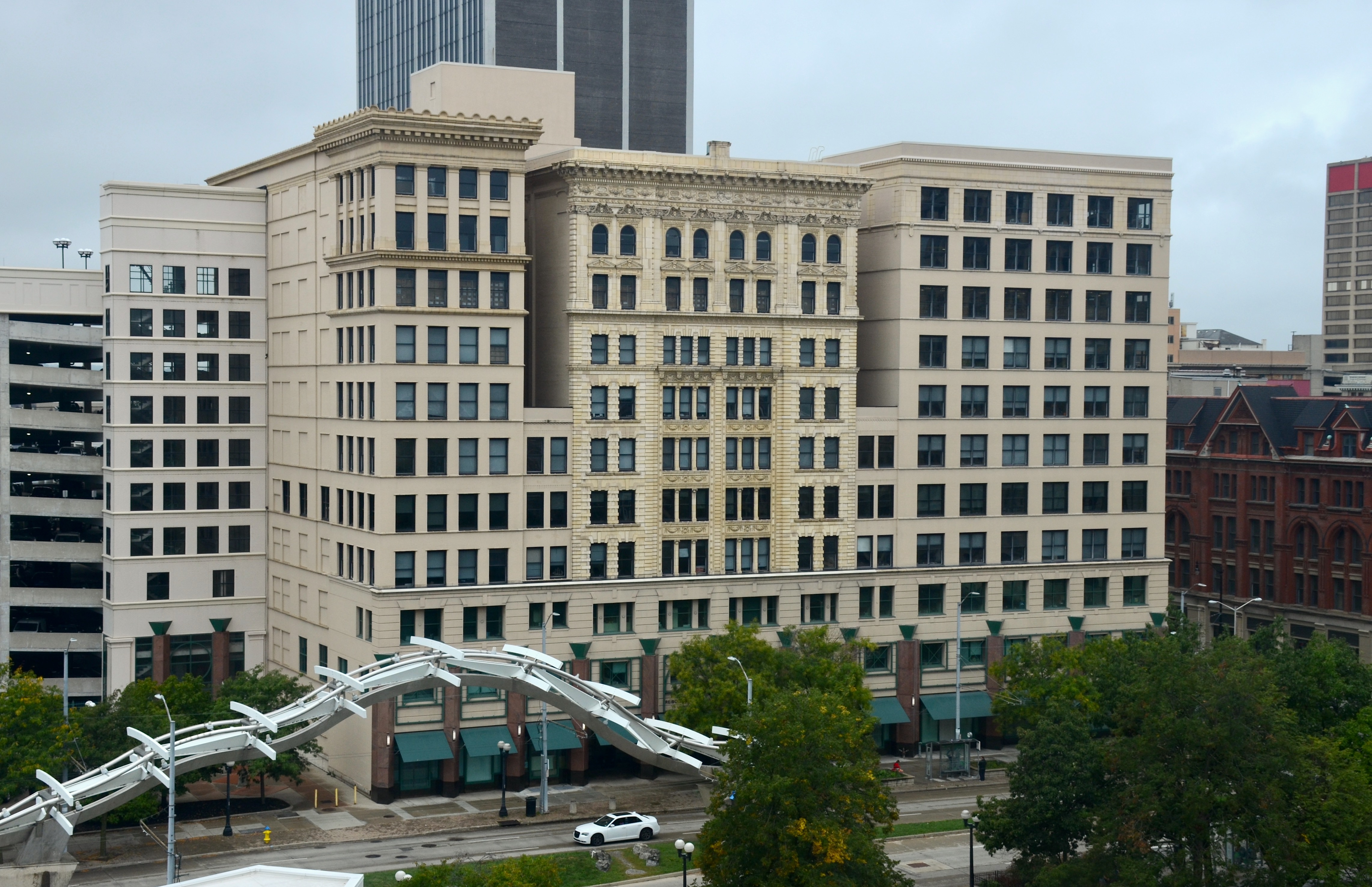
- Viewed from the east in 2021

General information
- Status: Completed

The Reibold Building in Dayton, Ohio, United States, was the area's tallest building from the time of its completion in 1896 until 1904 (when the first part of the Centre City Building, then known as the United Brethren Building, was completed). The Reibold building was named for the developer, Louis Napoleon Reibold, and housed The Elder & Johnston Department store (now Elder-Beerman) and offices. It was constructed in three phases: the center section in 1896, the South annex in 1904, and the North annex in 1914. The Peters Burns and Pretzinger firm (see Pretzinger) and Dayton native Charles Insco Williams are credited as its architects.

Otis Elevator Company installed 4 escalators in 1934, the first in Dayton.

A major renovation and addition of an 11-level parking structure by Architects Associated, Inc., L. B. Robinson Inc., and Heapy Engineering was completed in late 2002.

== See also ==
- List of tallest buildings in Dayton, Ohio
