= Grant-Deneau Tower =

331 ft, 22-story mixed-use skyscraper located in Dayton, Ohio

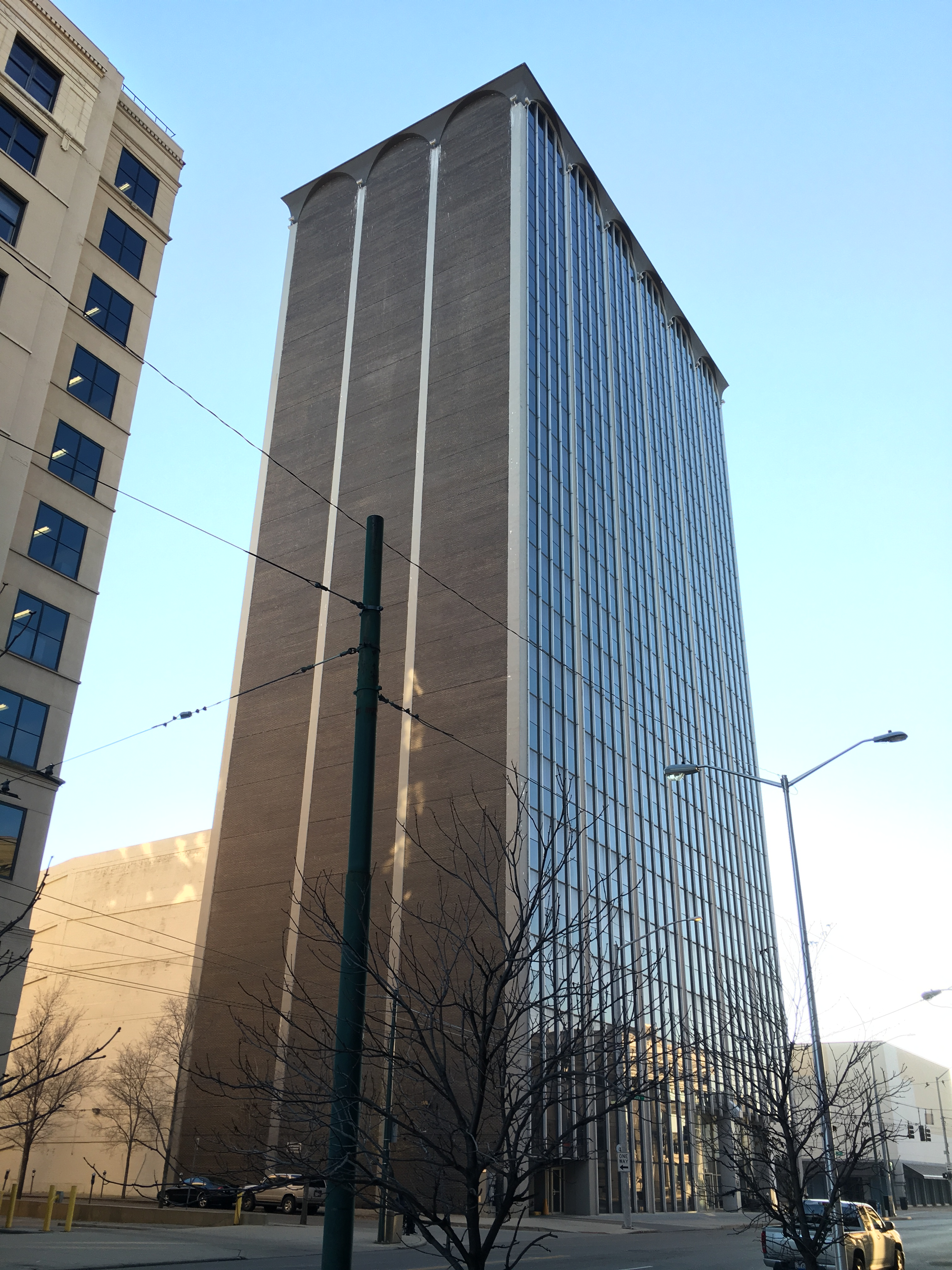
- Interactive map of the Grant-Deneau Tower area

General information
- Status: Completed
- Type: Office
- Coordinates: 39.7576°N 84.1927°W
- Completed: 1969

Technical details
- Floor count: 22
- Grant-Deneau Tower
- U.S. National Register of Historic Places
- Architect: Paul H. Deneau
- NRHP reference No.: 16000044
- Added to NRHP: February 23, 2016

The Grant-Deneau Tower (formerly known as 40 West 4th Centre) is a 331 ft, 22-story former office and now mixed-use skyscraper located in Dayton, Ohio. Upon its completion in 1969, it was the tallest building in Dayton, but was surpassed by the Kettering Tower one year later. It is now the fourth tallest building. It was designed by architect Paul H. Deneau. It was added to the National Register of Historic Places in 2016.

== See also ==
- List of tallest buildings in Dayton, Ohio
