= Virginia Weiffenbach Kettering =

Virginia Kettering
- Virginia Kettering
- Born: Virginia Weiffenbach; July 15, 1907; Bellevue, Kentucky
- Died: February 17, 2003 (aged 95); Kettering, Ohio
- Occupation: Philanthropist
- Years active: 1958 - 2003

Virginia Weiffenbach Kettering (1907 - 2003) was Dayton, Ohio's leading philanthropist and patron of the arts.

== Early life and education ==
Kettering was born July 15, 1907, in Bellevue, Kentucky, to architect and marble importer Norman and Clara Weiffenbach. She was their only child.

After her family moved to Dayton, Ohio for business opportunities, Virginia attended Moraine Park School, a progressive experimental school that had been established by Charles F. Kettering and Edward A. Deeds in 1917. Children of prominent Daytonians, including Charles Kettering's son Eugene, attended Moraine Park during the years it existed (1917 – 1927). It was at Moraine Park School that she met husband-to-be Eugene Kettering. Virginia also attended classes at Margaret Morrison Carnegie College (Pittsburgh), Carnegie Tech, and Lutherville Seminary (Maryland).

== Philanthropist ==
In 1959, the Ketterings announced they would donate two-thirds of the cost of building Kettering Memorial Hospital, named in honor of Eugene's father, Charles F. Kettering, who had died the previous year, if the remainder were raised by the community. The hospital opened in 1964.

In the 1960s, Kettering and her husband worked to create the United States Air Force Museum in Dayton, a pet project of Eugene. When her husband died in 1969, Kettering took over the project. "Her determination, logic, and meticulous attention kept the projects on track."

In 1972, Kettering founded the Dayton Holiday Festival and Children's Parade and work was completed on Kettering Tower.

In 1974, Kettering conceived and led the development of Courthouse Plaza, a downtown gathering space.

Kettering provided the impetus to refurbish the Victoria Theatre, a historic building in downtown Dayton. She conditioned the donation on the development of a downtown performing arts center. The Victoria Theatre refurbishment was completed in 1988 and the Schuster Performing Arts Center open nearby shortly after her death.

In 1996, Kettering donated $4 million for expansion the Dayton Art Institute and established a $1 million scholarship fund for Wright State University Medical School students who will serve elderly patients in Dayton for two years.

In 2000, Kettering established the $4.5-million-dollar Dayton Foundation Virginia W. Kettering Fund to "further the public good" and donated $2 million to Carillon Historical Park.

Kettering was the first individual contributor to the Fraze Pavilion project, which created an outdoor performance space in Kettering, Ohio, a suburb of Dayton named after Kettering's father-in-law.

Gifts to the University of Dayton and Wright State University exceeded $16.5 million during Kettering's lifetime. Total gifts throughout her lifetime have been "estimated very conservatively" at $150 million.

The Kettering Foundation supports charitable and community projects in eight counties surrounding Dayton plus the Sloan-Kettering Institute, the Cincinnati Zoo, and Kettering University.

== Impact ==
In her 2003 front-page obituary, the Dayton Daily News called her, "the Dayton region's leading philanthropist and arts patron." Her 1997 induction into the Dayton Walk of Fame said she "changed the face of the region through her philanthropy." Dayton Foundation president Mike Parks said, "There isn't a sector of our community that hasn't been touched by her generous hand."

== Personal life ==
Kettering married Eugene Williams Kettering on April 15, 1930. She was widowed in 1969, and in 1973, married retired Mead Papers president H. Warren Kampf. She was widowed again in 1979.

She and Kettering had three children. Kettering is buried in Woodland Cemetery and Arboretum.

The Ketterings lived in Hinsdale, Illinois, until the 1958 death of Eugene's father Charles F. Kettering, when they moved back to Dayton to take over management of the family's interests.

== Trustee and Director ==
- Banc One Corporation (Winters National Bank & Trust Co.), Director
- Memorial Sloan-Kettering Cancer Center, Director
- Young Women's Christian Association World Service Council, Director
- Asia Society, Director
- Air Force Museum Foundation, Director
- Robert Crown Center for Health Education, Director
- C. F. Kettering, Inc., Director
- The Kettering Fund, Trustee
- The Kettering Family Foundation, Trustee
- The Arts Center Foundation, Trustee
- The Miriam Rosenthal Fund, Trustee
- The Kettering Medical Center, Trustee
- The University of Dayton, Trustee
- Wright State University, Trustee
- 1971 - 1980 University of Dayton Board of Trustees

== Awards and honors ==
- Almoner Award from Madonna Center Associates of Chicago
- Citation Of Honor from Wright Memorial Chapter, Air Force Association
- Award Of Merit from Contractors of America
- Service To Mankind Award from Optimist Club
- Hadassah Myrtle Wreath Award
- Dayton's Ten Top Women Of The Year Award
- Citizens Legion Of Honor awarded by the Presidents Club Of Dayton
- City Of Dayton Manager's Top Flight Award For Outstanding Service
- Walk Of Fame Dayton Municipal Airport
- The Fellows Program (Highest Honor Bestowed By The Engineers Club)
- Friendship Award (National Conference for Community & Justice of Greater Dayton)
- 1995 Ohio Arts Council Governor's Award
- 1997 Dayton Walk of Fame
- 2003 Heart of Dayton (American Heart Association)
- Virginia W. Kettering Hall: Residence and Dining Hall at The University of Dayton

=== Honorary degrees ===
- The University of Dayton
- Wright State University
- Skidmore College
- GMI Engineering & Management Institute (Now Kettering University)
