= Charles Herby =

American architect

- Born: April 14, 1846; Northamptonshire, England
- Died: August 16, 1914 (aged 68); Dayton, Ohio, US
- Resting place: Woodland Cemetery
- Known for: Architect
- Spouse: Sarah C. Cunningham (m. 1871)
- Children: 10

Charles Herby (1846-1914) was an English-born American architect. He designed the Centre City Building in Dayton, Ohio.

== Early life ==
Herby was born in Northamptonshire, England in 1846. In 1849 his family, William and Elizabeth (Johnson) Herby, emigrated to the United States and settled on a farm near Dayton, Ohio. He had seven brothers and sisters, three who died in infancy, while two boys and two girls lived to maturity. The family home in Montgomery County was retained until 1880, when the parents removed to Newton, Kansas, where the father died in 1883. Soon after, Charles brought his mother to his home in Dayton, where she died in November 1895.

== Career ==
Herby worked on his father's farm and at the age of eighteen years he enlisted in Company K, thirty-first regiment of the Ohio National Guard. He performed garrison duty in Baltimore, Maryland from May 4, 1864 until August 23, 1864.

Herby apprenticed as a carpenter and was a contractor and builder for about twenty years. Around 1882, he became a resident of Dayton, and in 1890 decided to devote his time wholly to architectural work and is "now ranked among the most successful draftsmen in the city." He built the Centre City Building, schools, and churches in the Dayton area. Herby had his office in the Beckel building.

=== Centre City Building ===
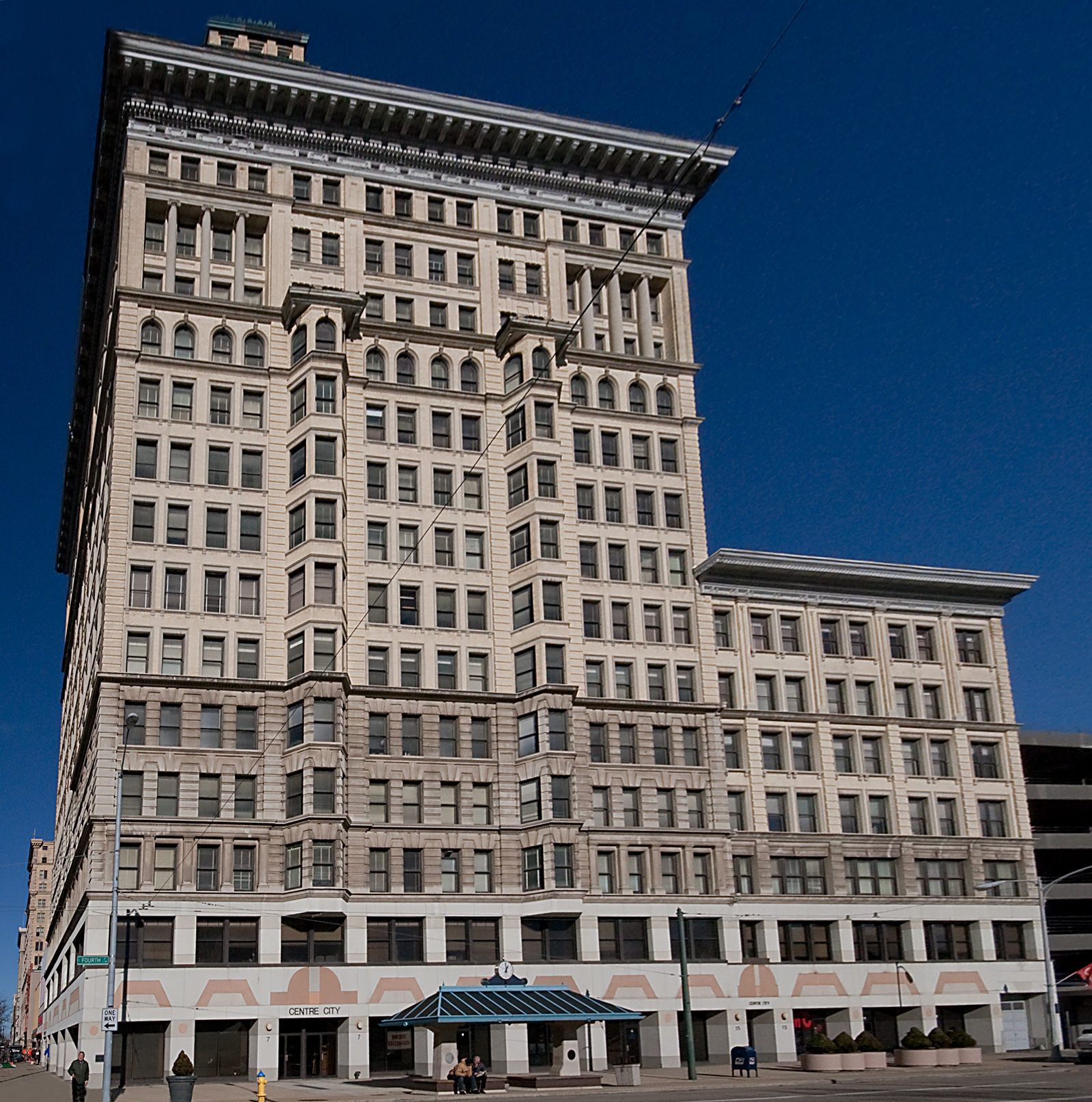
Centre City Building in Dayton, Ohio

The 14-floor southern section of the building is framed in steel, and when it was completed in 1904 it was the United Brethren Building. Liberty Tower (then known as the Mutual Home Savings Association Building) was the first area building to surpass it in height.

The 21-story tower portion was completed in 1927, one of the tallest reinforced concrete buildings in the world at that time. It was added to the National Register of Historic Places in 1993.

== Personal life ==
Herby married Sarah C. Cunningham, a native of Montgomery County, in 1871. Her parents were Joseph and Emily Cunningham, the former of whom was a prominent farmer. They had ten children, five that died in infancy. The five survivors included: Daisy, Walter E., Roy, James Garfield, and Wilbur.

Herby was a Republican and had close ties to the Raper Methodist Episcopal Church, where he was a class leader and assistant superintendent of the Sunday school.

== Death ==
Herby died on August 16, 1914. He was buried at Woodland Cemetery.
