= KeyBank Tower =

Skyscraper in Dayton, Ohio

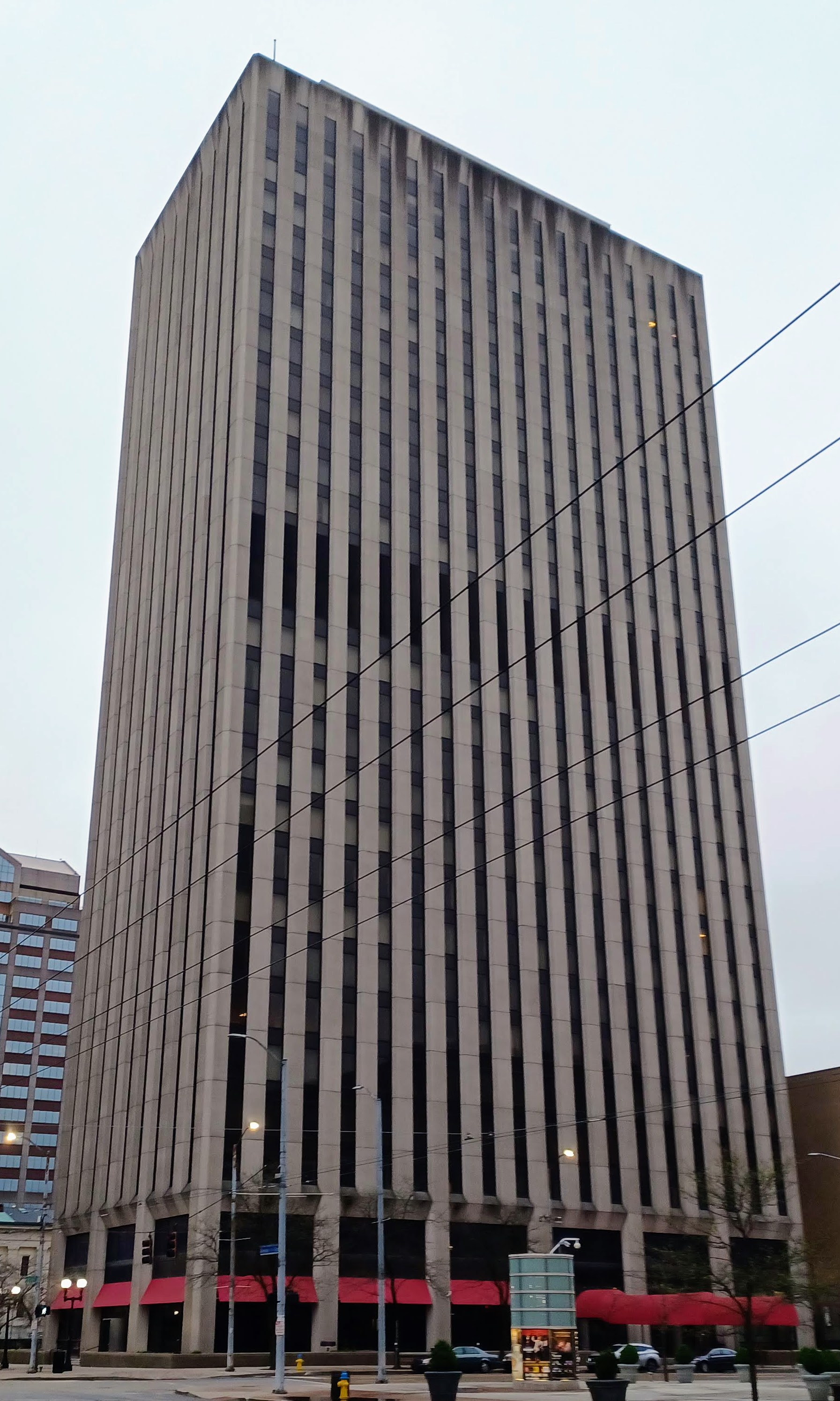
- KeyBank Tower in 2024
- Interactive map of the KeyBank Tower area
- Former names: MeadWestvaco Tower

General information
- Type: Office
- Location: Dayton, Ohio, U.S.
- Coordinates: 39.760634°N 84.192588°W
- Current tenants: KeyBank
- Completed: 1977

Height
- Roof: 384 feet (117 m)

Technical details
- Floor count: 27

Design and construction
- Architects: Lorenz+Williams, Inc.

KeyBank Tower is a skyscraper in Dayton, Ohio, United States. Its address at 10 West 2nd Street was the first official name of the structure. The building was once named MeadWestvaco Tower until KeyBank gained naming rights to the tower in 2008. The tower has 27 floors and is 384 feet (117 m) tall. KeyBank occupies about 45,000 square feet of office space spread across four floors of the tower. The main office branch was previously located on the first floor of the tower until it closed in May 2021. Other tenants include National Processing Solutions, Scientific Simulations Systems, Colliers International, and the Downtown Dayton Partnership.

The first floor of the KeyBank Tower houses an OinkADoodleMoo BBQ restaurant.

In 2010, a group of Cincinnati investors purchased KeyBank Tower. The 397,000-square-foot (36,900 m^{2}) building was purchased from THMG 10 West Second Street LLC, a real estate investment company. The company is taking approaches to have the entire office tower leased.

== See also ==
- List of tallest buildings in Dayton, Ohio
