= National Museum of the United States Air Force =

Military and aviation museum in Dayton, Ohio, United States

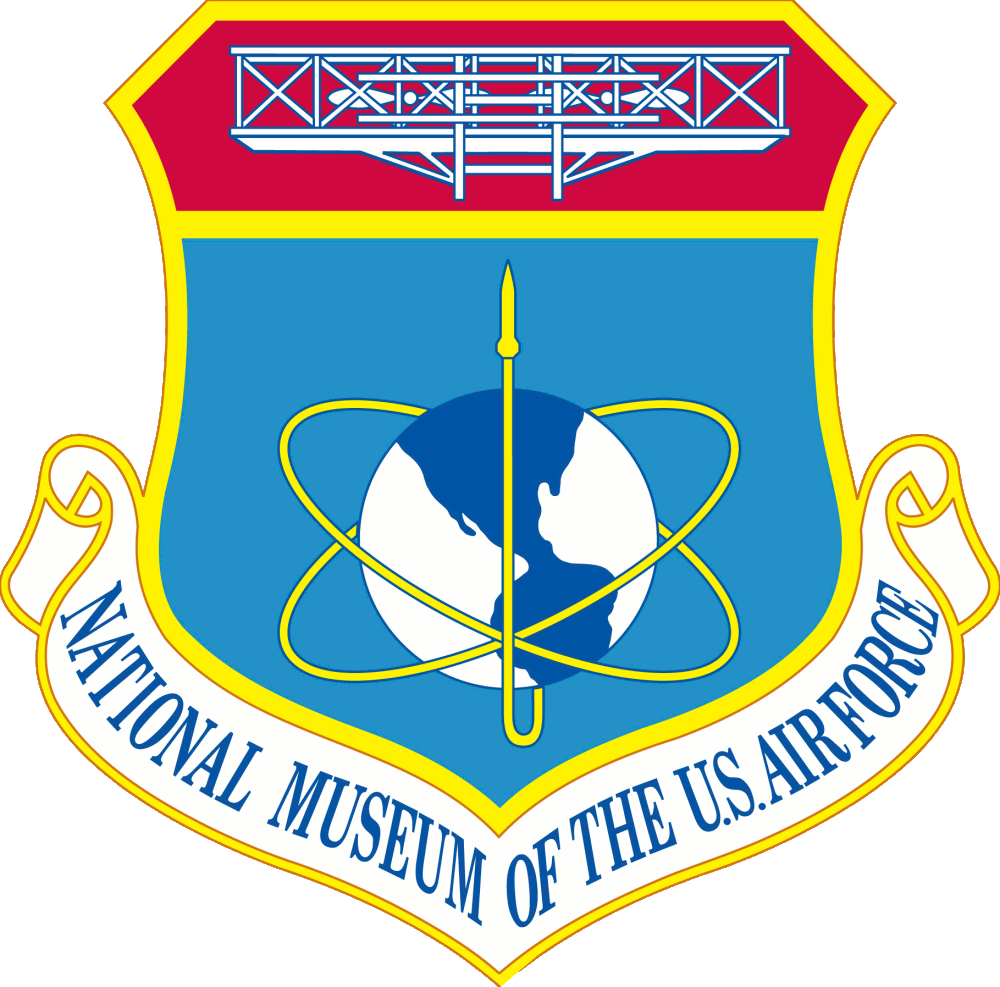
- Former name: Army Aeronautical Museum; Air Force Technical Museum; United States Air Force Museum
- Established: 1923
- Location: Wright-Patterson Air Force Base, Dayton, Ohio
- Coordinates: 39°46′53″N 84°06′38″W
- Type: Military aviation museum
- Visitors: About 1 million
- Director: David Tillotson
- Curators: Vacant, Deputy Director/Senior Curator
- Public transit access: Greater Dayton RTA Route X6
- Website: nationalmuseum.af.mil airforcemuseumfoundation.org

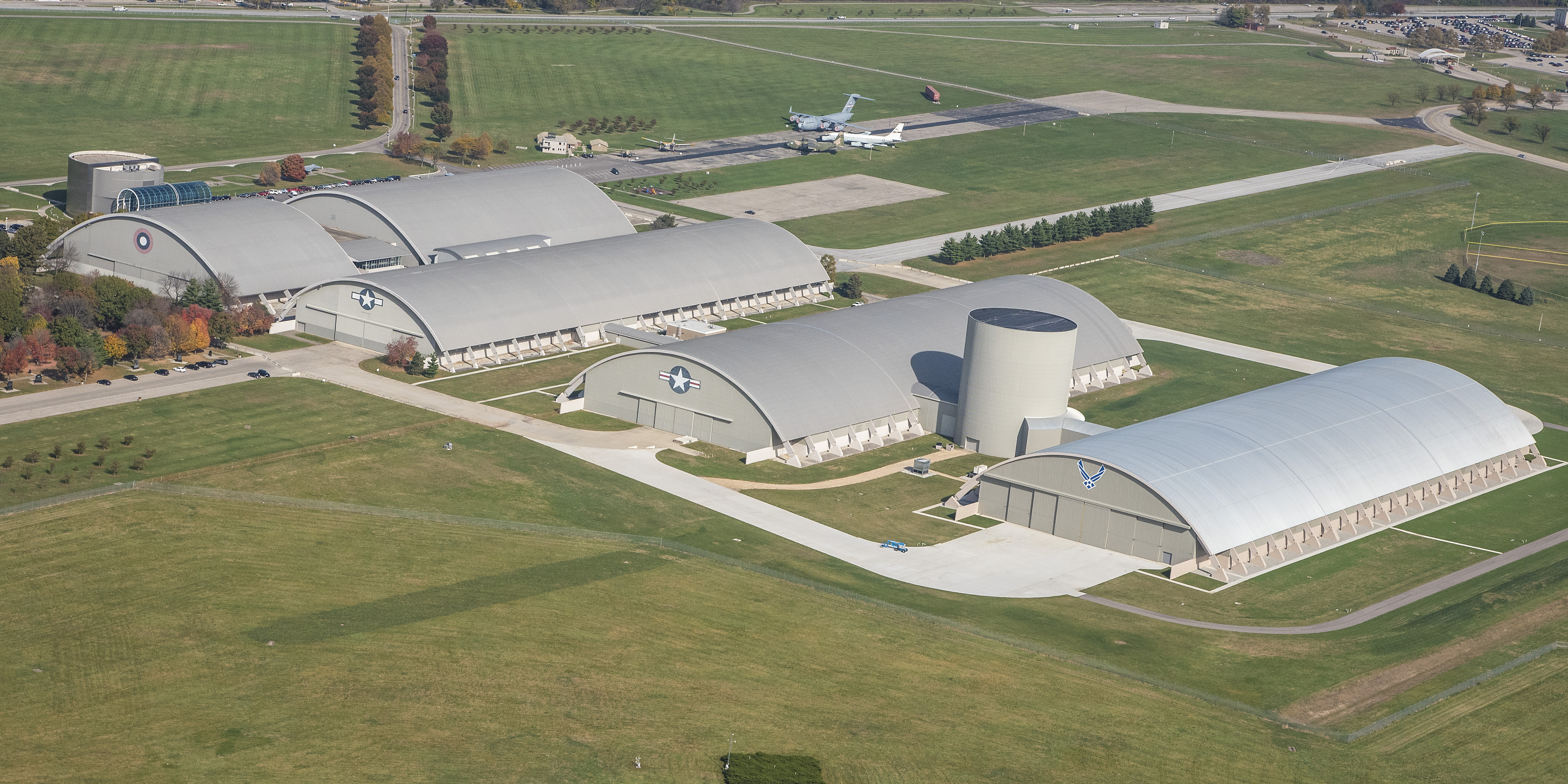
Aerial view of the National Museum of the U.S. Air Force

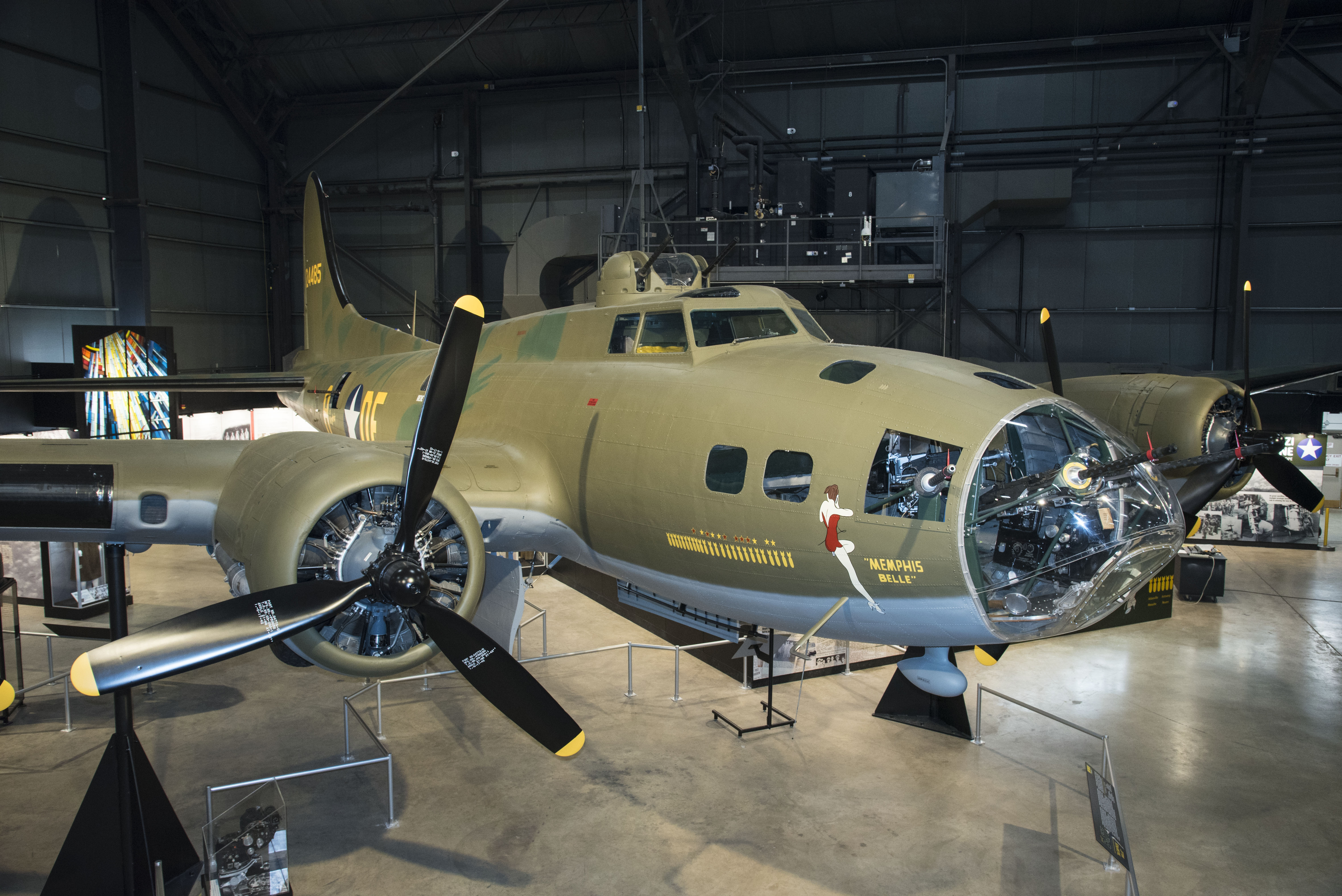
Boeing B-17F Memphis Belle on display in the museum's World War II Gallery.

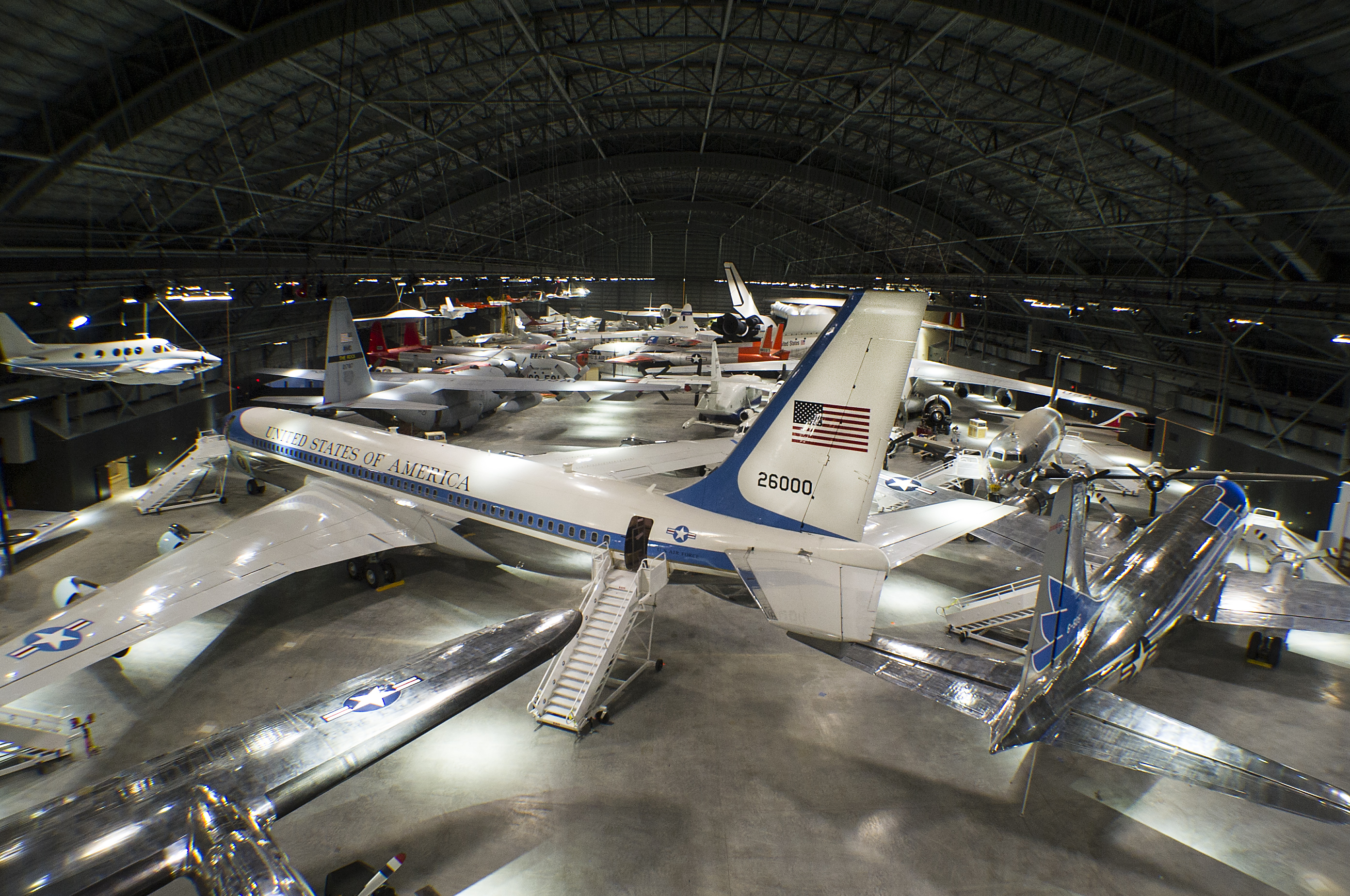
The Boeing VC-137C SAM 26000 used as Air Force One by United States presidents John F. Kennedy, Lyndon B. Johnson (who was sworn into office on the plane), and Richard Nixon.

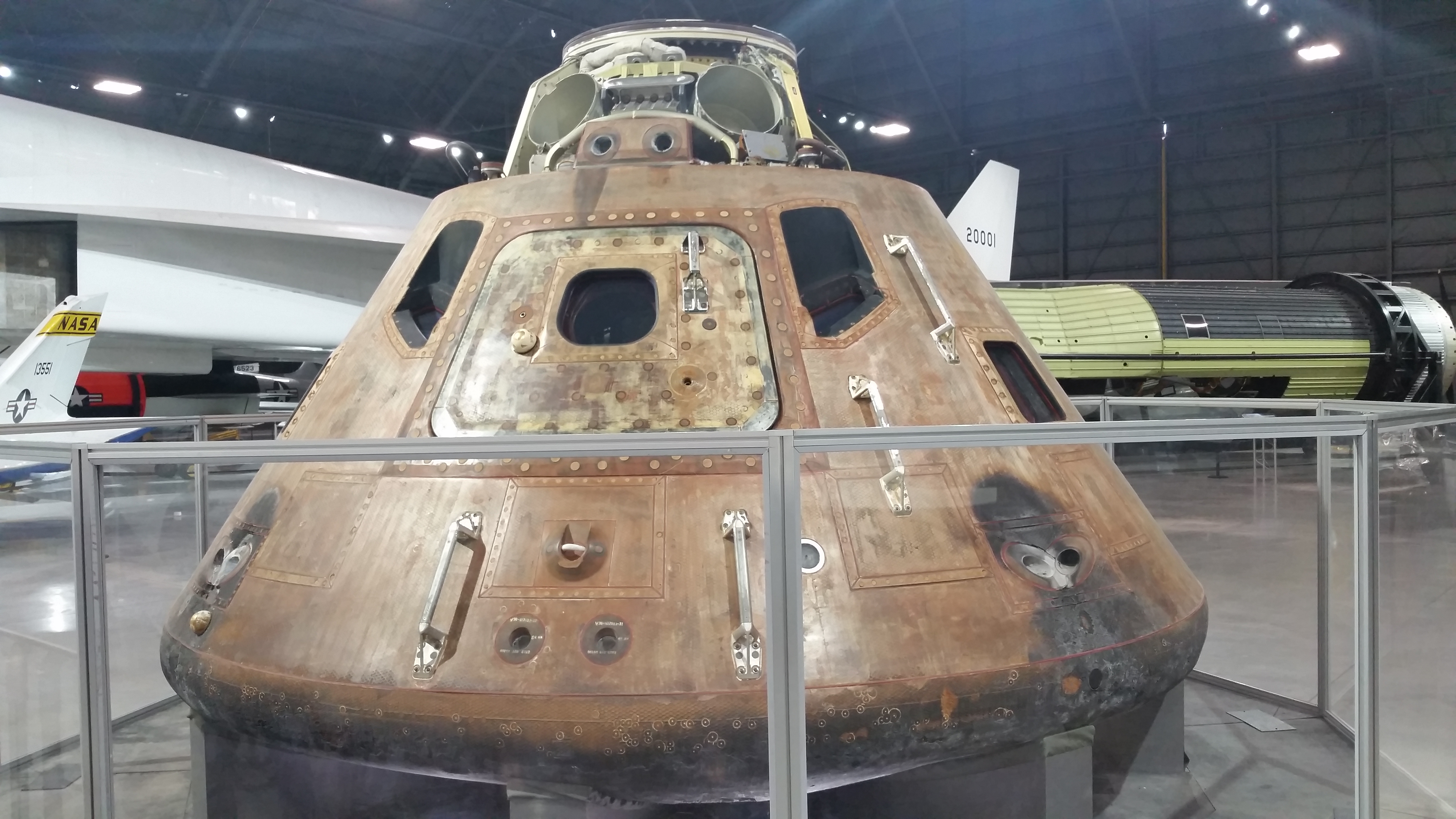
Apollo 15 Command Module Endeavour which carried David Scott, James Irwin, and Alfred Worden to the Moon in 1971 on NASA's fourth crewed lunar landing mission

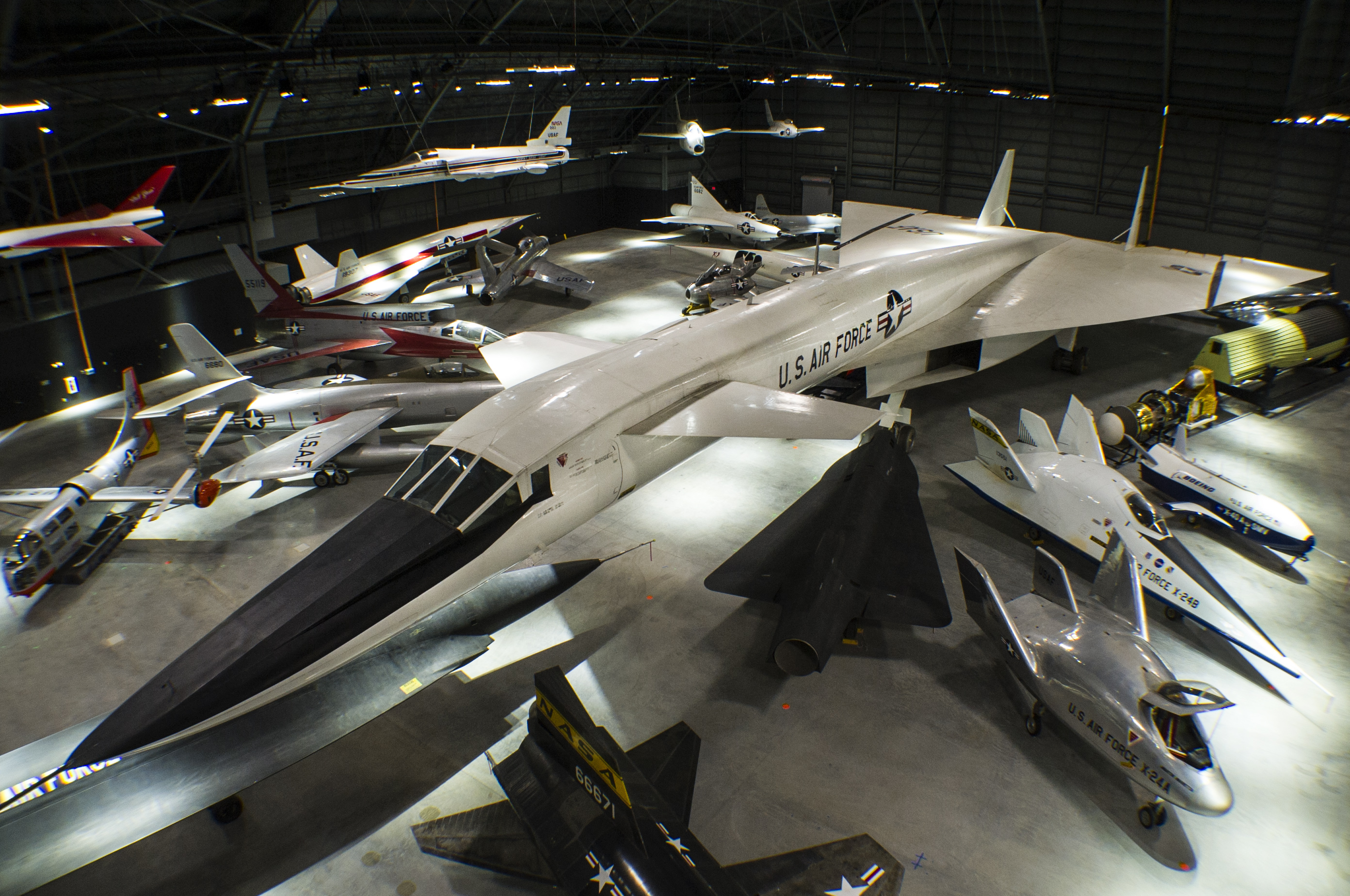
The North American XB-70 Valkyrie is on display in the fourth building.

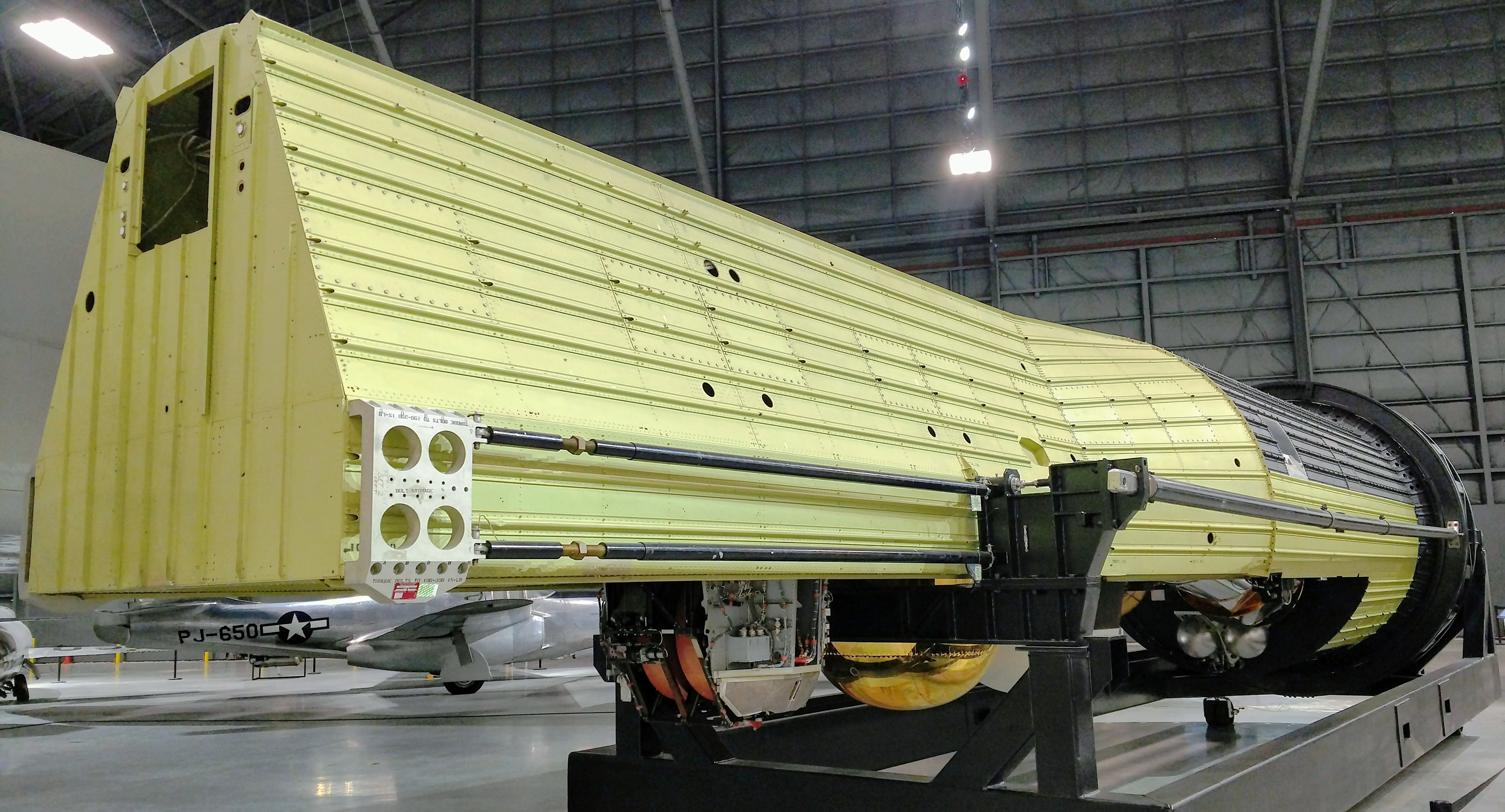
The KH-9 Hexagon photographic reconnaissance satellite on display.

The National Museum of the United States Air Force (formerly the United States Air Force Museum) is the official museum of the United States Air Force located at Wright-Patterson Air Force Base, six miles (9.7 km) northeast of Dayton, Ohio. The NMUSAF is the oldest and largest military aviation museum in the world, with more than 360 aircraft and missiles on display. The museum is a central component of the National Aviation Heritage Area. The museum draws about a million visitors each year, making it one of the most frequently visited tourist attractions in Ohio.

== History ==
The museum dates to 1923, when the Engineering Division at Dayton's McCook Field first collected technical artifacts for preservation. In 1927, it moved to then-Wright Field in a laboratory building. In 1932, the collection was named the Army Aeronautical Museum and placed in a WPA building from 1935 until World War II. In 1948, the collection remained private as the Air Force Technical Museum. In 1954, the Air Force Museum became public and was housed in its first permanent facility, Building 89 of the former Patterson Field in Fairborn, which had been an engine overhaul hangar. Many of its aircraft were parked outside and exposed to the weather.

Through the 1960s, Eugene Kettering, son of Charles F. Kettering, led the project to build a permanent structure to house the collections and became the first chairman of the board of the Air Force Museum Foundation. When he died in 1969, his widow Virginia took over the project. Her "determination, logic and meticulous attention" kept it on track, and the current facility opened in 1971. Not including its annex on Wright Field proper, the museum has more than tripled in square footage since 1971, with the addition of a second hangar in 1988, a third in 2003, and a fourth in 2016.

In October 2004, the name changed from United States Air Force Museum to National Museum of the United States Air Force.

In June 2016, the museum opened its 224,000-square-foot (20,800 m^{2}) fourth building that expanded the museum to the current 1,120,000 square feet (104,000 m^{2}) of exhibit space. The fourth building houses the Space Gallery, Presidential Aircraft Gallery, and Global Reach Gallery. With the additional space, more than 70 aircraft that were in storage have been put back on display, such as the XB-70 Valkyrie. The Presidential Aircraft collection is also back on site, having been moved to an outside location for some time. The Air Force Museum Foundation funded the construction entirely with private donations from several different sources at a cost of $40.8 million (equivalent to $52.1 million in 2024).

On 28 February 2024, a tornado touched down in the Riverside area in Montgomery County, Ohio. The museum was struck by the tornado causing damage. The base commander, Col. Travis Pond, said that "the damage was isolated to the southern side of Area B. Damaged buildings included the Museum’s Restoration Hangar 4, Gate 22B, and other nearby facilities."

A 90,750-square-foot (8,431 m^{2}) STEM education facility to be located adjacent to the museum was announced in February 2026.

== Exhibits and collections ==
The museum is divided into galleries that cover broad historic trends in military aviation. These are further broken down into exhibits that detail specific historical periods and display aircraft in historical context.

The museum's collection contains many rare aircraft of historical or technological importance, and various memorabilia and artifacts from the history and development of aviation. Among them is the Apollo 15 Command Module Endeavour which orbited the Moon 74 times in 1971, one of four surviving Convair B-36 Peacemakers, the only surviving North American XB-70 Valkyrie and Bockscar—the Boeing B-29 Superfortress that dropped the Fat Man atomic bomb on Nagasaki during the last days of World War II.

In 2010, the museum launched its 360-degree Virtual Tour, allowing most aircraft and exhibits to be viewed online.

In 2018, the Boeing B-17F Memphis Belle was placed on permanent public display in the World War II Gallery. The aircraft and its crew became iconic symbols of the heavy bomber crews and support personnel who helped defeat Nazi Germany.

=== Presidential aircraft ===
The museum has several Presidential aircraft, including those used by Franklin D. Roosevelt, Harry Truman, and Dwight D. Eisenhower. The centerpiece of the presidential aircraft collection is SAM 26000, a modified Boeing 707 known as a VC-137C, used regularly by presidents John F. Kennedy, Lyndon B. Johnson, and Richard Nixon. This aircraft took President Kennedy and Mrs. Kennedy to Dallas on 22 November 1963—the day of the President's assassination. Vice President Johnson was sworn in as president aboard it shortly after the assassination, and the aircraft then carried Kennedy's body back to Washington, D.C. It became the backup presidential aircraft after Nixon's first term. It was temporarily removed from display on 5 December 2009, repainted and returned to display on President's Day in 2010.

All presidential aircraft are now displayed in the Presidential Gallery, in the fourth building.

=== Pioneers of flight ===
A large section of the museum is dedicated to pioneers of flight, especially the Wright Brothers, who conducted some of their experiments at nearby Huffman Prairie. A replica of the Wrights' 1909 Military Flyer is on display, as well as other Wright brothers artifacts. The building also hosts the National Aviation Hall of Fame, which includes several educational exhibits.

=== Uniforms and clothing ===
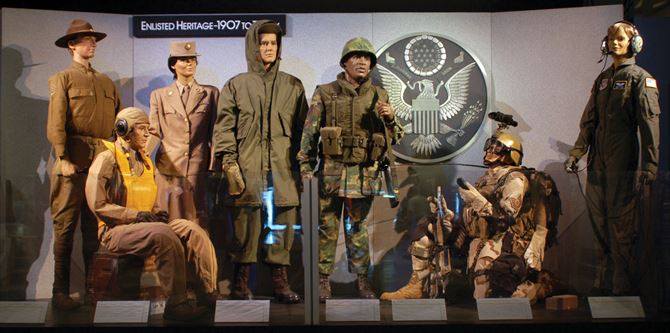
"Enlisted Heritage Uniforms" exhibit on display at National Museum of the U.S. Air Force

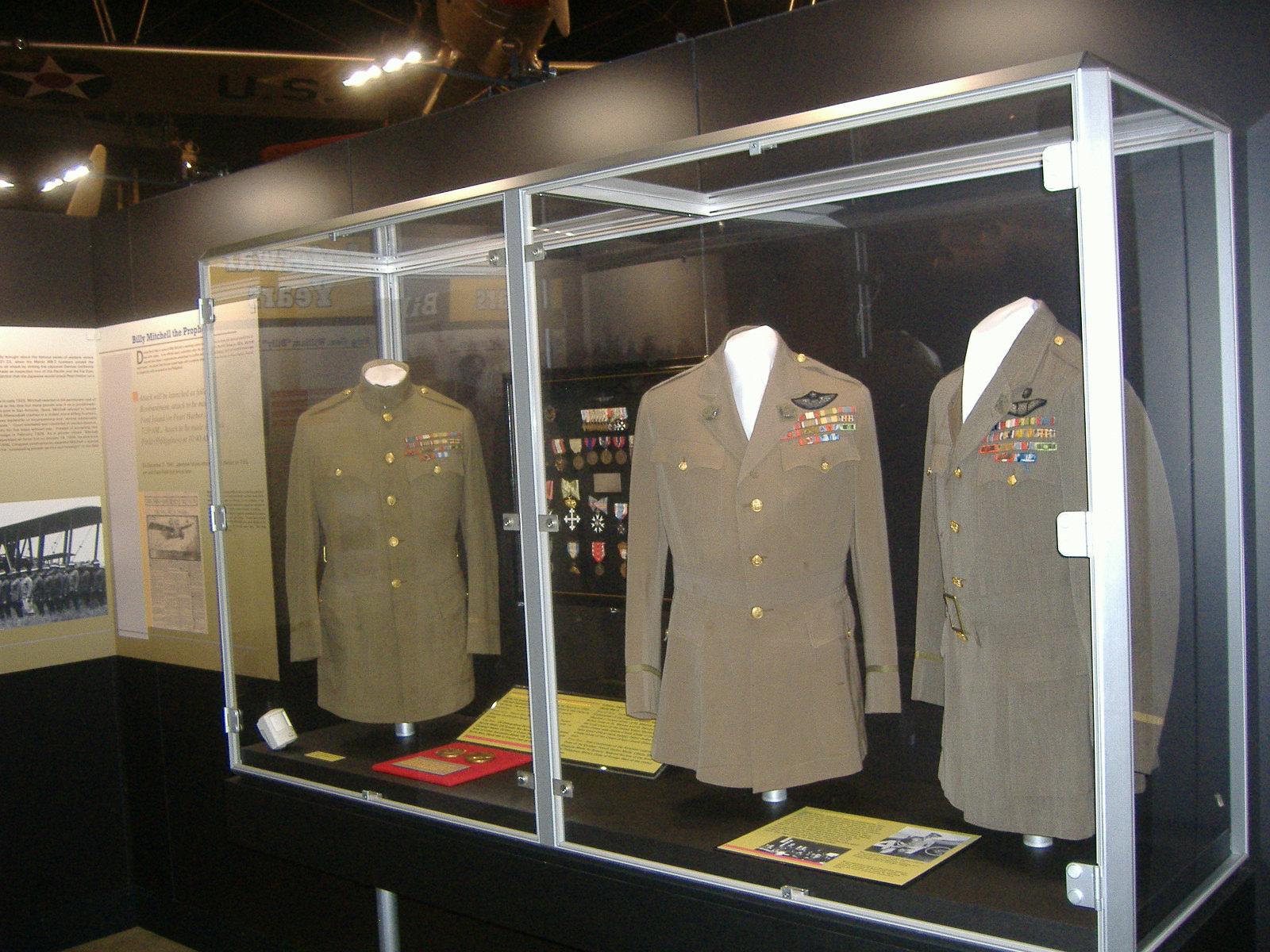
Major General Billy Mitchell's uniform displayed on far left at National Museum of the U.S. Air Force

The museum has many pieces of U.S. Army Air Forces and U.S. Air Force clothing and uniforms. At any time, more than 50 World War II-vintage A-2 leather flying jackets are on display, many of which belonged to famous figures in Air Force history. Others are painted to depict the airplanes and missions flown by their former owners. The displays include the jacket worn by Brigadier General James Stewart, P-38 ace Major Richard I. Bong's sheepskin B-3 jacket and boots, an A-2 jacket worn by one of the few USAAF pilots to leave the ground during the attack on Pearl Harbor, and President Ronald Reagan's USAAF peacoat.

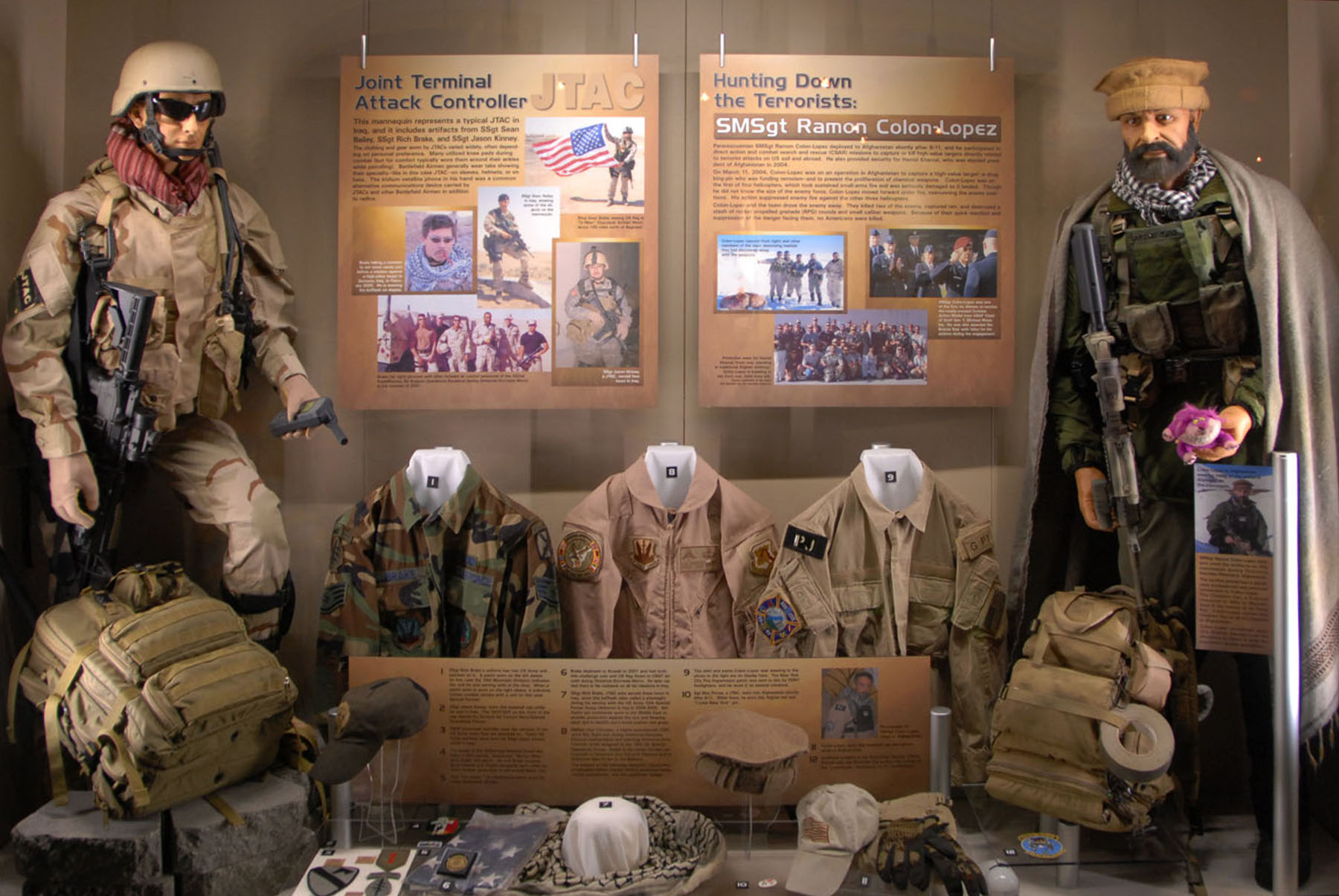
Part of the "Warrior Airmen" exhibit on display in the Cold War Gallery at the National Museum of the U.S. Air Force

=== Other exhibits and attractions ===
The third building houses post-Cold War era planes such as the Northrop Grumman B-2 Spirit stealth bomber (test aircraft), the Lockheed F-117 Nighthawk stealth ground attack aircraft and others.

The fourth building has four galleries, Presidential, Research and Development, Space and Global Reach, housing more than 70 aircraft, missiles, and space vehicles. Also in the fourth building is an enlarged educational outreach area with three science, technology, engineering and math (STEM) Learning Nodes. Previously these collections were housed in an annex facility on Area B of Wright-Patterson Air Force Base (the former Wright Field). Because the annex was physically located on the base itself, museum guests were required to go through additional security checks before taking museum buses to the hangar.

The museum owns other USAF aircraft, including former U.S. Army Air Service, USAAC or USAAF aircraft, that are on loan to other aerospace museums in the United States and overseas, as well as those on permanent static display at various U.S. Air Force installations and tenant activities worldwide, and at Air Force Reserve and Air National Guard installations across the United States. Most of these loaned aircraft duplicate aircraft exhibited by the museum. These other aircraft remain the property of the Department of the Air Force and are typically identified at these locations as being "On Loan from the National Museum of the U.S. Air Force." The museum's staff has very high standards for the restoration and quality of care of loaned assets and has, in the past, revoked these loans when it was deemed that these other museums did not have the resources to properly care for an artifact. This happened in the case of the famous Boeing B-17 Flying Fortress, Memphis Belle.

For an additional fee, guests can view aviation- and space-oriented films in a large format theater interspersed primarily with other documentaries. In 2013, the Air Force Museum Theater was upgraded from IMAX to digital 3D. The renovation included a new stage, theater seats, and a new theater screen to support a broader range of programming—including educational presentations, live broadcasts and expanded documentary choices. It also included a 7.1 surround-sound system, audio devices for the hearing or visually impaired, and personal closed captioning systems.

== Organization ==
The organizational structure of the museum is composed of several divisions, which include collection management, education, exhibits, operations, plans and programs, public affairs, research, restoration and special events.

== Air Force Museum Foundation ==
The Air Force Museum Foundation is a private, non-profit organization that supports the mission and goals of the National Museum of the U.S. Air Force.

== See also ==
- American Air Museum in Britain
- Mighty Eighth Air Force Museum
- National Museum of the Marine Corps
- National Museum of the United States Army
- National Museum of the United States Navy
- National Naval Aviation Museum (the U.S. Navy's equivalent facility to the NMUSAF)
- United States Air Force Memorial
- United States Army Aviation Museum

Related lists

- List of aerospace museums
