= Stratacache Tower =

High-rise office building located in Dayton, Ohio

STRATACACHE Tower
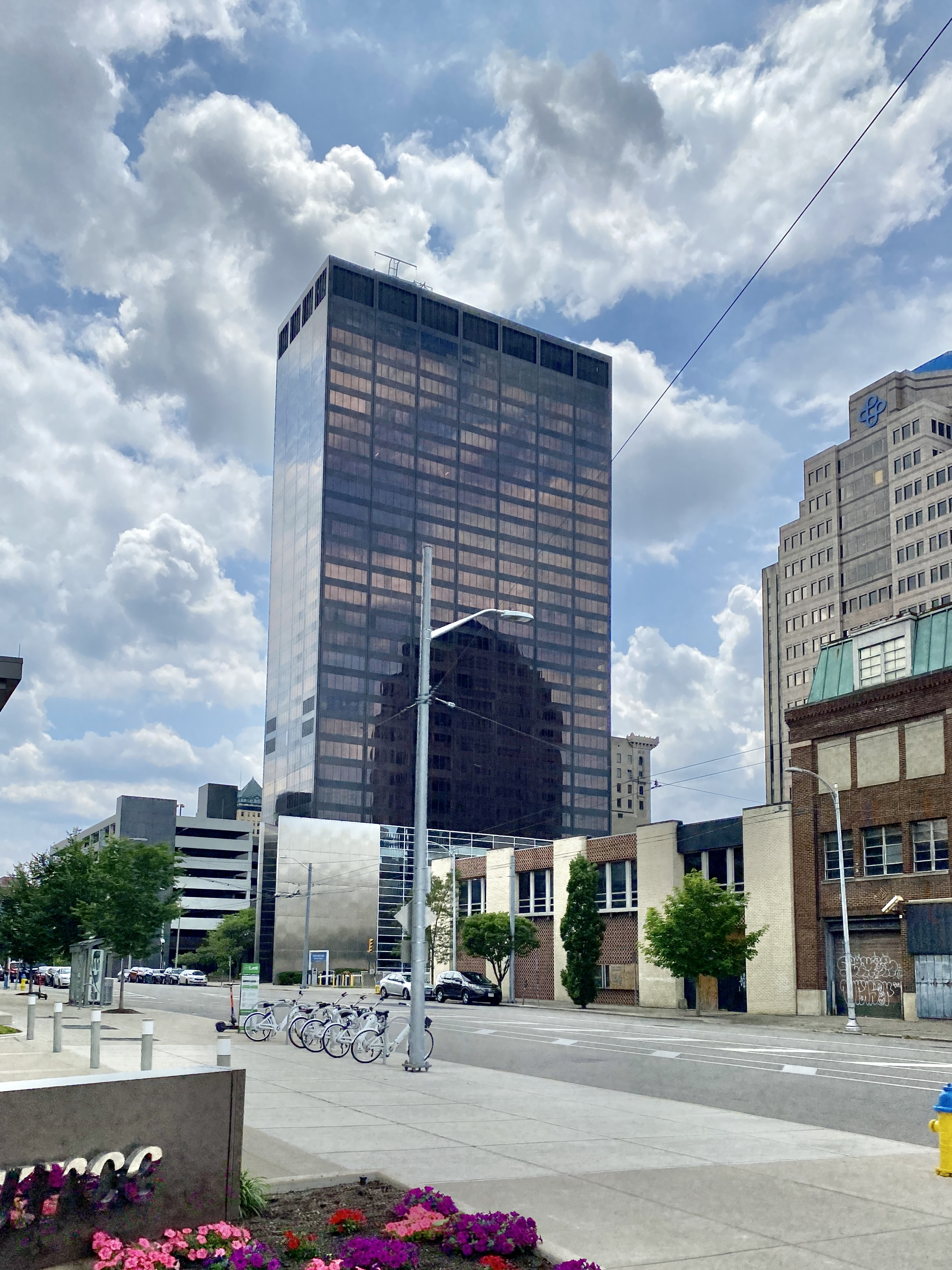
- Interactive map of the STRATACACHE Tower area

General information
- Status: Completed
- Type: Office
- Location: Dayton, Ohio USA
- Coordinates: 39.760964°N 84.191408°W
- Groundbreaking: April 9, 1969
- Completed: 1970
- Cost: $15,000,000

Height
- Roof: 124 metres (407 ft)

Technical details
- Floor count: 30
- Floor area: 45,162 m^{2} (486,120 sq ft)

Design and construction
- Architects: Lorenz+Williams, Inc.

Website
- stratacachetower.com

STRATACACHE Tower, also known as Kettering Tower, is a high-rise office building located in Dayton, Ohio. STRATACACHE Tower was built in 1970 and is currently the tallest building in the city. Lorenz Williams Inc. was the firm responsible for construction of the building. STRATACACHE Tower has 30 floors and is 124 meters or 405 feet tall. STRATACACHE Tower has its own zip code: 45423.

== History ==
The building opened for business in 1972. The property was originally named Winters Bank Tower and served as the headquarters for Winters Bank. After Bank One, which was headquartered in Columbus, acquired Winters Bank, the building owner, Virginia Kettering, the daughter-in-law of inventor Charles F. Kettering, changed the name to Kettering Tower.

In 2005, a New York investment firm, Kettering Tower Partners LLC, bought the Kettering Tower for $21.9 million, or $45.63 per square foot. The Kettering Tower owner defaulted on the mortgage and the property was sold to Bank of America for $10.8 million at a Montgomery County Sheriff's Auction in 2011. In 2012, Albert Macanian of Dunkirk Realty, paid only $6.4 million for the property. In 2019 it was sold for $13 million to STRATACACHE, which makes digital signs and monitors for restaurants and retail as well as virtual and augmented reality software for retail. The tower was later rebranded as STRATACACHE Tower, serving as global headquarters for the company.

== Restaurants and amenities ==
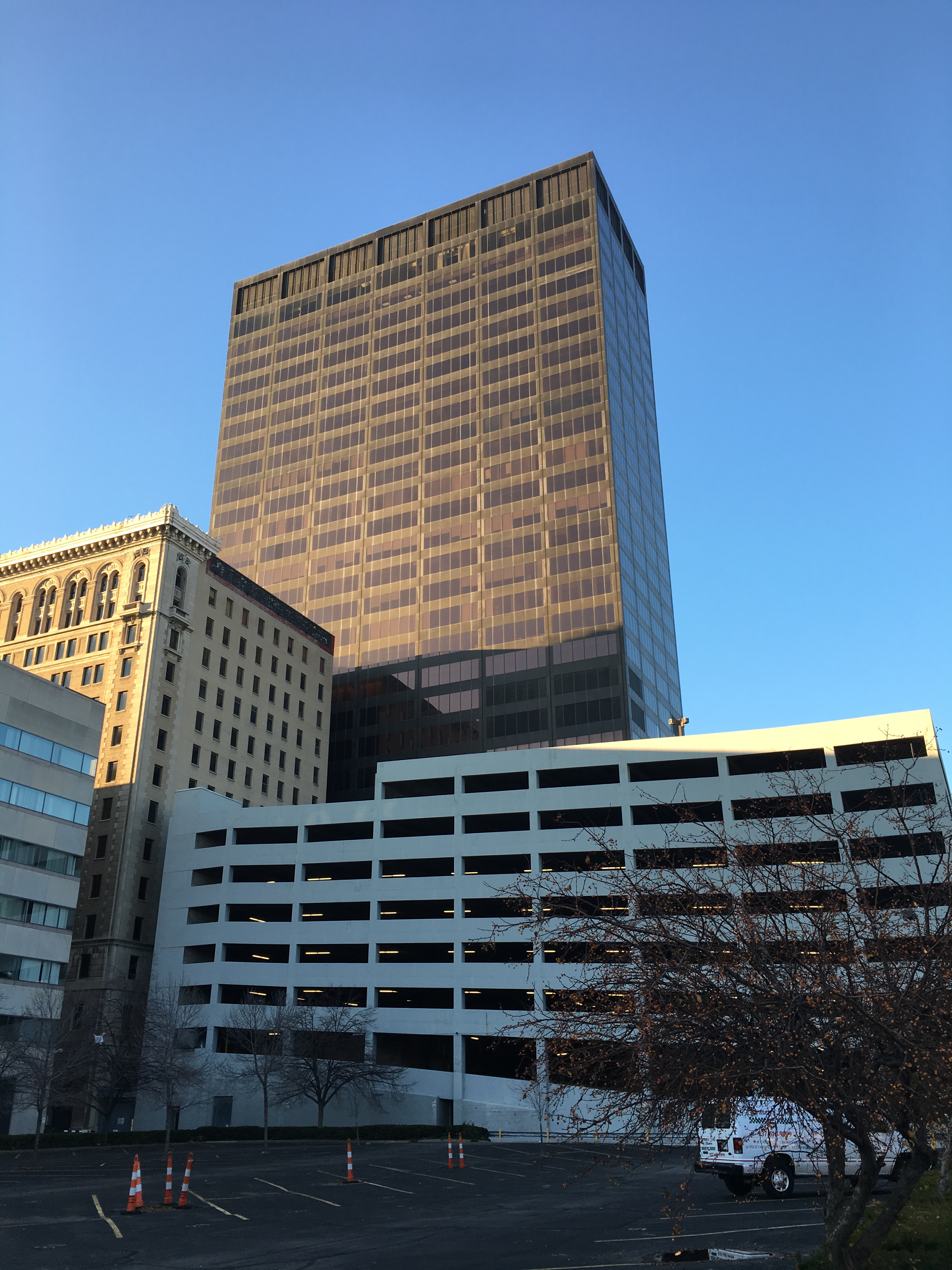
Kettering Tower in 2015

Located in the tower was the Dayton Club, formerly the Dayton Racquet Club, which offered a fitness center and business-conducive dining and banquet facilities, but which permanently closed in 2020. On the ground floor is an optometrist and the restaurant Carmen's Deli. For many years, a large Chase Bank branch was on the second floor of the tower, but ceased operations in December 2020. In June 2021, the law firm Taft Dayton signed a deal for a 15-year lease at Stratacache Tower, with plans to renovate the building's 16th and 17th floors to increase its office space, as well as opening a 3,900 foot Taft Center on the building's first floor, intended for use for meetings, conferences and events, serving as a gathering space for the local community.

== Current tenants ==
The tenant roster includes the offices of many prominent companies, including:

- Taft Stettinius & Hollister
- Pickrel Schaeffer & Ebeling
- Rogers & Greenberg
- Thorn Lewis + Duncan, Inc. CPA's
- Bailey Cavalieri LLC
- Tenet3
- Premier Retail Networks

== See also ==
- List of tallest buildings in Dayton, Ohio
