= Fifth Third Center (Dayton) =

High-rise office tower located in Downtown Dayton, Ohio

Coordinates: 39.759249°N 84.192159°W

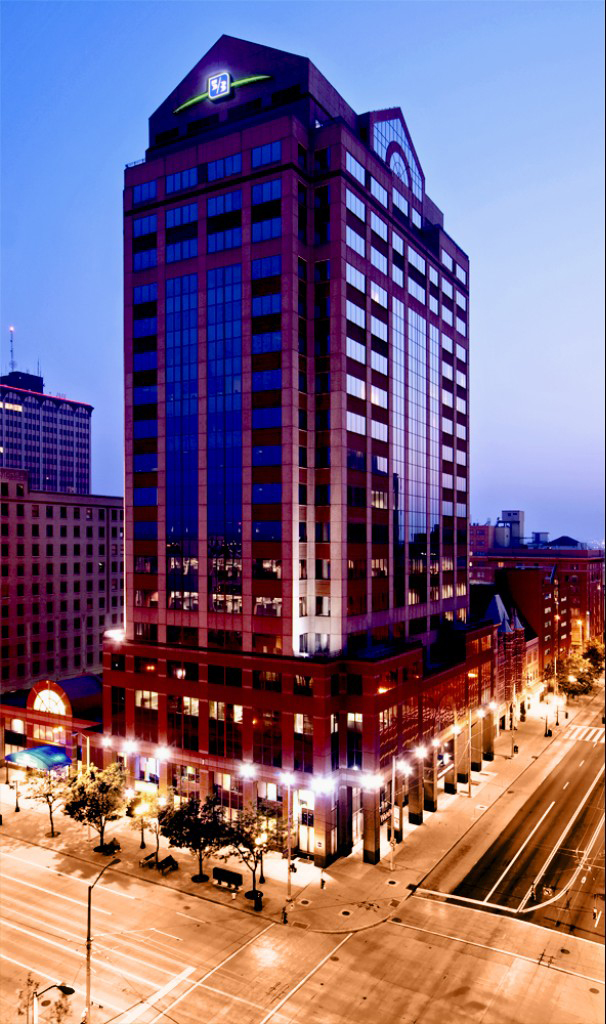
- Exterior of Fifth Third Center in Dayton, Ohio
- Interactive map of the Fifth Third Center area

General information
- Status: Completed
- Location: Dayton, Ohio, 1 South Main Street Suite 200 Dayton, OH 45402
- Completed: 1989

Height
- Height: 328 ft (100 m)

Technical details
- Floor count: 20 (+2 below-grade)

Design and construction
- Architects: Sherman, Carter & Barnhart

Other information
- Parking: Fifth Third Center Parking Garage - 420 spaces

Website
- http://www.1southmaindayton.com/

Fifth Third Center is a high-rise office tower located in Downtown Dayton, Ohio.

== About Fifth Third Center ==
Dayton's Fifth Third Center is owned by R.L.R. Investments L.L.C. a property investment company with available properties for residential and commercial use.

Dayton’s Fifth Third Center accommodates Fifth Third Bank and Wright-Patt Credit Union, which are both located in the lobby of the tower.

The tower holds amenities such as the tenant conference center located on the 5th floor, which is reserved for the use of Fifth Third Center Tenants. Additionally, the tower has a seven-level concrete parking garage, offering approximately 419 covered parking spaces. Which is also home to Olive Mediterranean Grill located on the 1st floor retail level.

== See also ==
- List of tallest buildings in Dayton, Ohio
