= Centre City Building =

Historic office building in Ohio, United States

- United Brethren Publishing House
- U.S. National Register of Historic Places
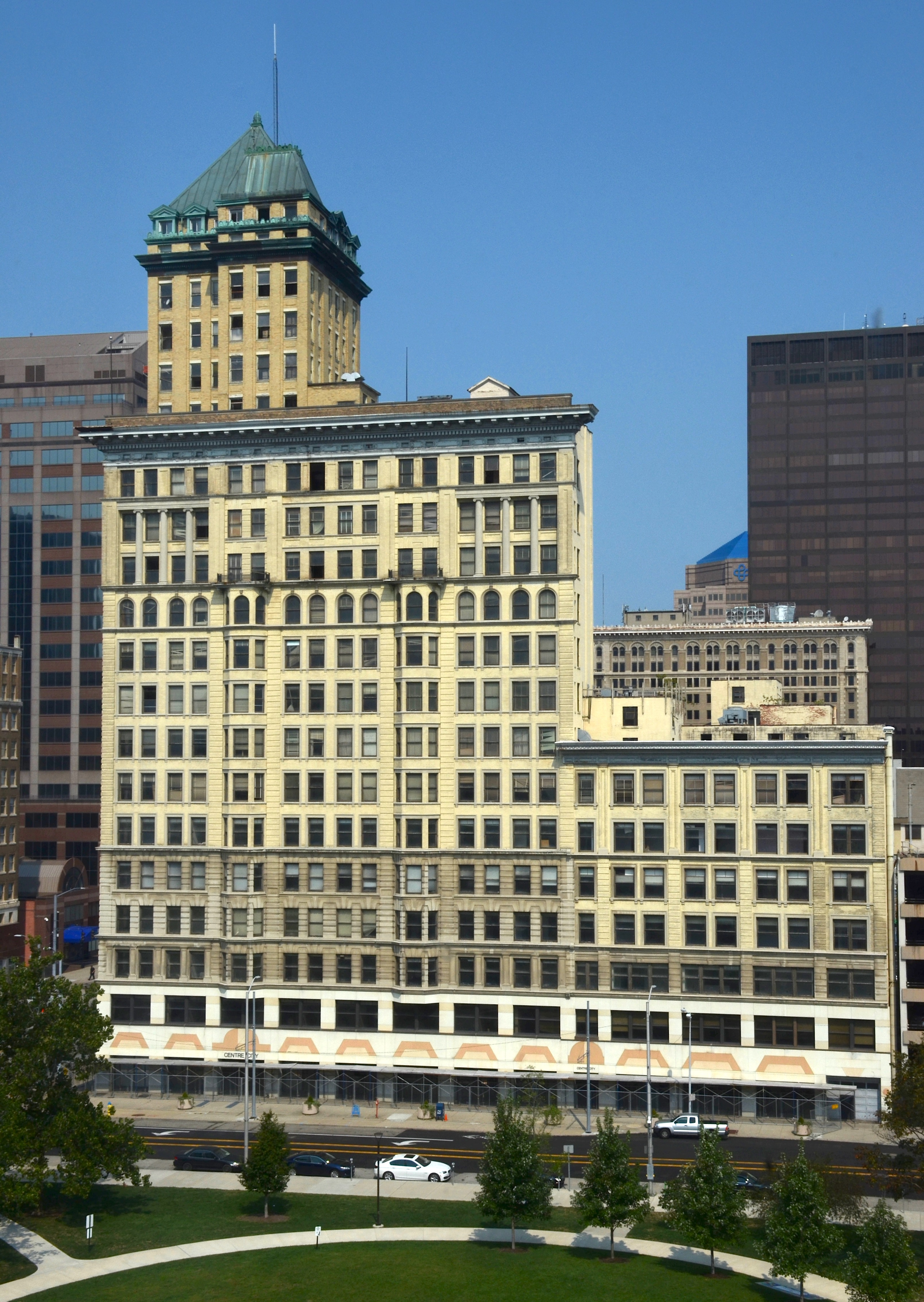
- Viewed from the south in 2021

- Location within Ohio Location within the United States
- Location: Dayton, Ohio
- Coordinates: 39°45′30″N 84°11′29″W
- Architect: Charles Herby
- Architectural style: Chicago
- NRHP reference No.: 93001391
- Added to NRHP: December 10, 1993

The Centre City Building (formerly known as the United Brethren Building) is a historic building at 36-44 South Main Street at the corner of East Fourth Street in downtown Dayton, Ohio. It was designed by Charles Herby and built in 1904 by the F.A. Requarth Co. for the sum of $305,000 as the headquarters of the Church of the United Brethren in Christ Christian denomination. Originally 14 stories, it was the tallest building in Dayton from 1904 until 1931. A seven-story tower portion was completed in 1924, capped by a chapel for the Church, making it 21 stories total. It is considered to have been Dayton's first skyscraper.

It housed the general offices of the church, and of the succeeding Evangelical United Brethren Church. It also served as headquarters to the United Brethren Publishing House.

It was sold in 1975, converted to a personal residence by its owner, then sat vacant by 2012.

It was purchased in 2017 by Centre City Partners LP, with plans for a $46 million renovation to include residence apartments, office spaces and retail shops.

This building was added to the National Register of Historic Places on December 10, 1993.

On Saturday, January 11, 2020, a number of the building's windows were blown out by powerful storm winds, resulting in the temporary closure of the neighboring Wright Stop Plaza, the downtown hub for the Greater Dayton Regional Transit Authority. At the time, the building was up for sale for more than four million dollars.

On November 10, 2020, a large pane of glass from the building fell onto a nearby sidewalk, forcing barriers to be erected. The building has been vacant since the mid-2000s, changing ownership a couple of times during that period. Dayton city manager Shelley Dickstein expressed that the building may see development following completion of the renovation of the Dayton Arcade.

On December 13, 2024, a fire was reported inside the building, which was still vacant. The fire was considered suspicious due to the building's being abandoned and Hazmat crews were called as a precautionary measure, as officials could not be sure what was inside.

== Historic uses ==
- Church headquarters
- Commerce/trade
- Manufacturing

== See also ==
- National Register of Historic Places listings in Dayton, Ohio

== Sources ==
- Eller, Paul Himmel,These Evangelical United Brethren (Dayton, Ohio: The Otterbein Press, 1950).
- listing at Emporis.com (retrieved 22 September 2009)
