= Fifth Third Bank =

American bank holding company

Fifth Third Bancorp

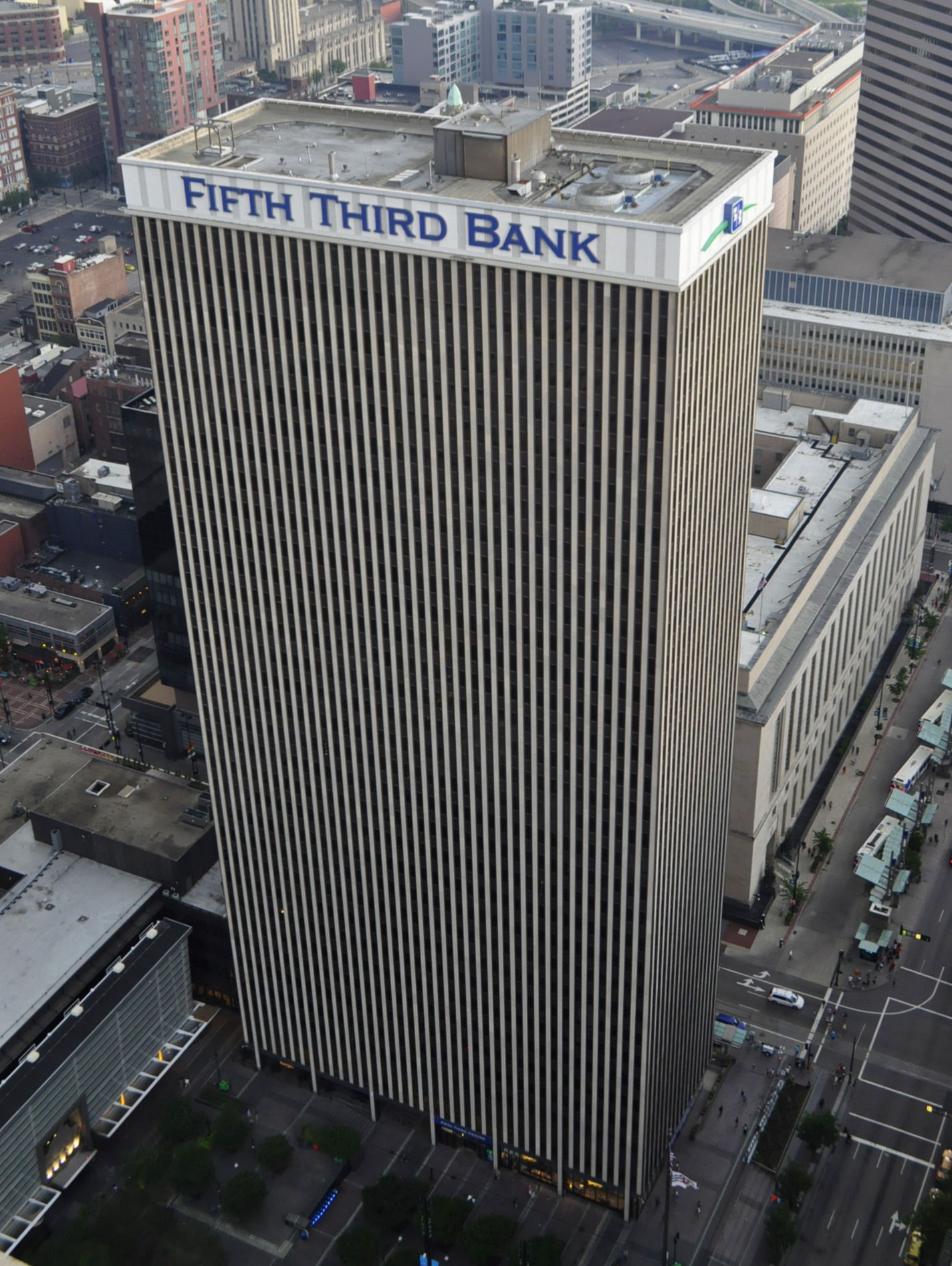
- The Fifth Third Center headquarters of Fifth Third Bancorp in Cincinnati, Ohio
- Trade name: Fifth Third Bank
- Type: Public
- Traded as: NYSE: FITB; S&P 500 component
- Industry: Banking; Investment banking; Financial services
- Predecessor: Bank of the Ohio Valley, Third National Bank, Fifth National Bank
- Founded: June 17, 1858; 168 years ago, in Cincinnati, Ohio, U.S. (as Bank of the Ohio Valley)
- Headquarters: Fifth Third Center, Cincinnati, Ohio, U.S.
- Number of locations: 1,087 branches and 2,400 automated teller machines
- Area served: Regional
- Key people: Timothy N. Spence (chairman, CEO and president); Bryan D. Preston (CFO)
- Products: Consumer banking, corporate banking, private banking, financial analysis, insurance, investment banking, mortgage loans, private equity, wealth management, credit cards
- Revenue: 5,609,000,000 United States dollar (2022)
- Operating income: 3,093,000,000 United States dollar (2022)
- Net income: ▼US$2.212 billion (2023)
- Total assets: ▲US$214.574 billion (2023)
- Total equity: ▲US$19.172 billion (2023)
- Number of employees: 18,724 (December 2023)
- Website: 53.com

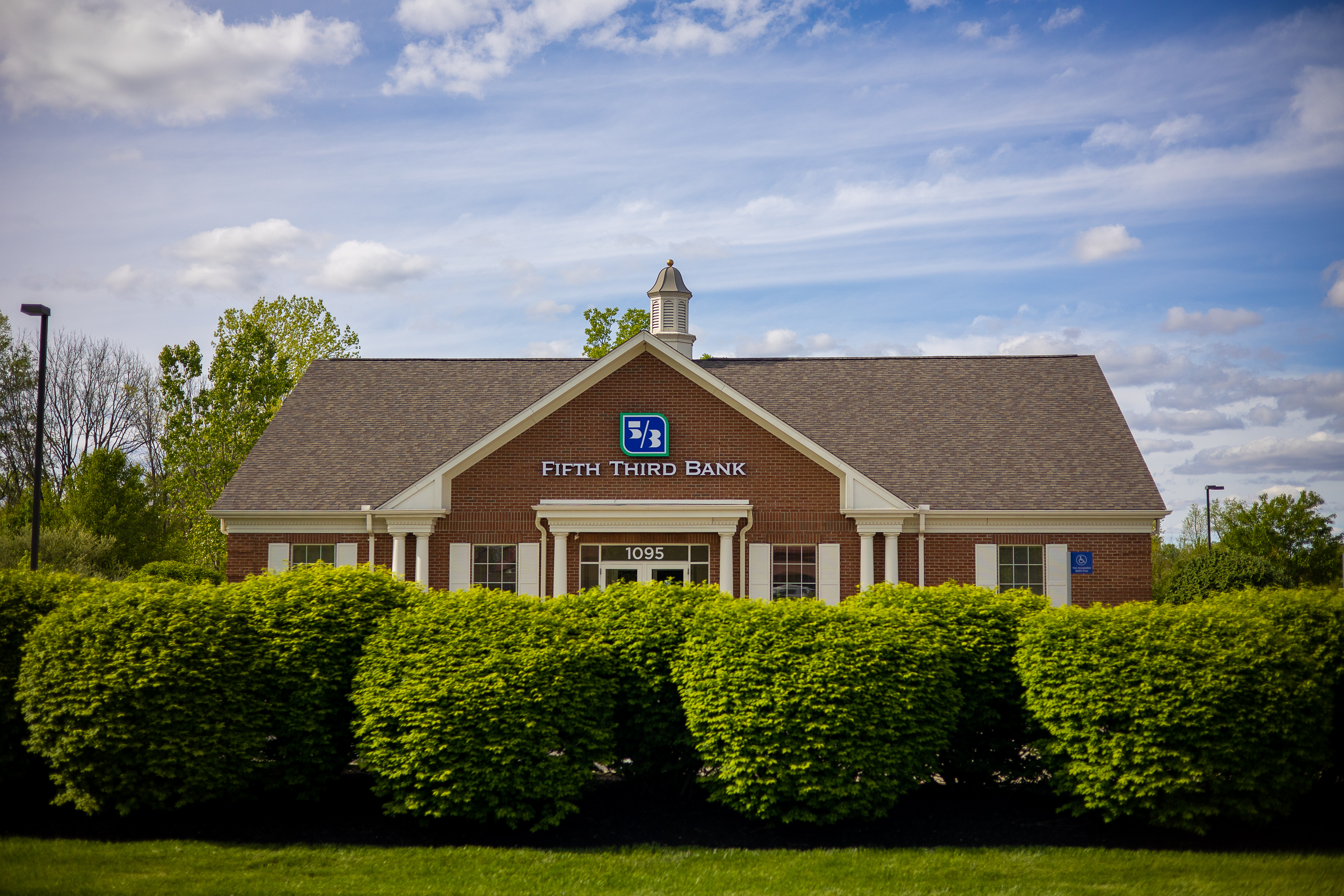
Fifth Third Bank branch located in Fairborn, Ohio

Fifth Third Bancorp is a bank holding company headquartered in Cincinnati, Ohio. It is the parent company of Fifth Third Bank (commonly abbreviated 5/3), which operates 1,087 branches and 2,400 automated teller machines, across 12 states: Ohio, Alabama, Florida, Georgia, Illinois, Indiana, Kentucky, Michigan, North Carolina, South Carolina, Tennessee, and West Virginia. One of the largest banks in the United States, it is ranked 321st on the Fortune 500. The name "Fifth Third" is derived from the names of the bank's two predecessor companies, Fifth National Bank and Third National Bank, which merged in 1908.

== History ==
=== Pre-merger (1858-1908) ===
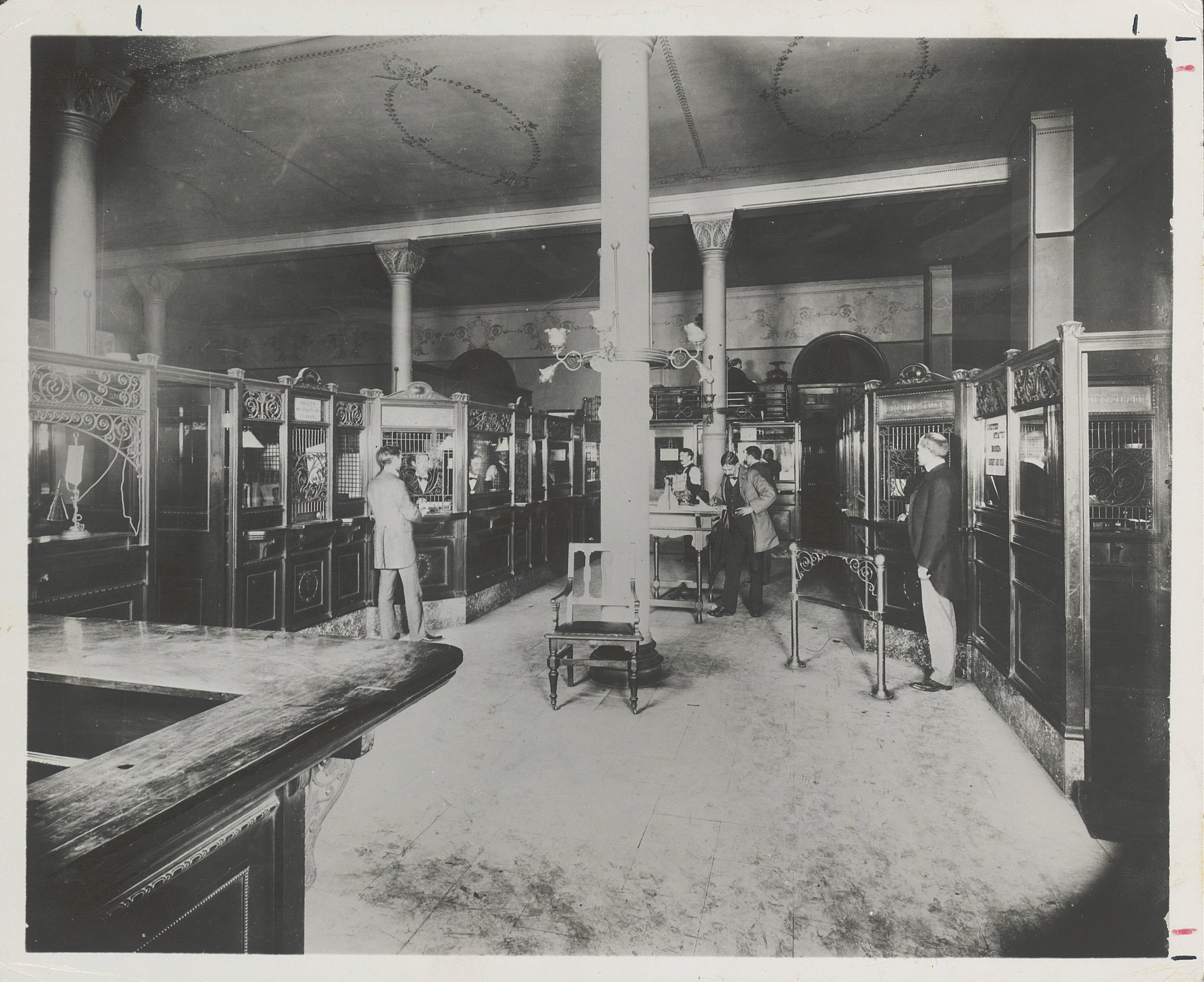
The lobby of Fifth National Bank in downtown Cincinnati (1893)

On June 17, 1858, the Bank of the Ohio Valley, founded by William W. Scarborough, opened in Cincinnati, Ohio. On June 23, 1863, the Third National Bank was organized. On April 29, 1871, Third National Bank acquired Bank of the Ohio Valley. In 1888, Queen City National Bank changed its name to Fifth National Bank.

=== Merger of Third National Bank and Fifth National Bank (1908) ===
On June 1, 1908, Third National Bank and Fifth National Bank merged to become the Fifth-Third National Bank of Cincinnati; the hyphen was later dropped. The merger took place when prohibitionist ideas were gaining popularity, and it is a legend that "Fifth Third" was better than "Third Fifth", which could have been construed as a reference to three fifths of alcohol. The name went through several changes—the most recent being Fifth Third Union Trust Company—until March 24, 1969, when it was changed to Fifth Third Bank.

=== Post-merger and current day operations ===
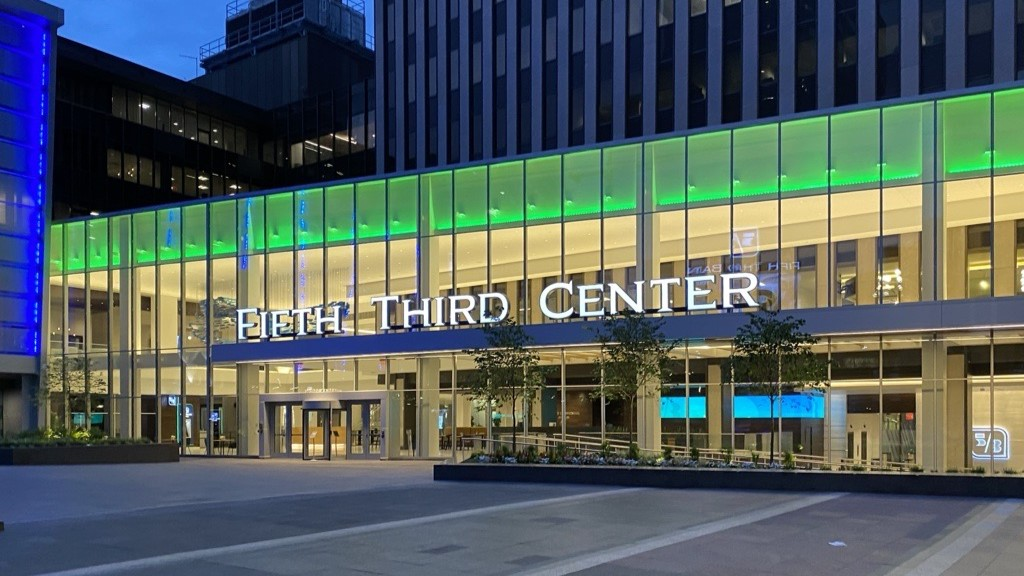
Fifth Third Center atrium at the headquarters in Cincinnati.

In 1999, the bank acquired Emerald Financial for $204 million.

On August 16, 2007, Fifth Third Bank announced its purchase of First Charter Bank of North Carolina.

In November 2008, the United States Department of the Treasury invested $3.4 billion in the company as part of the Troubled Asset Relief Program and in February 2011, the company repurchased the investment from the Treasury.

The next year, Fifth Third completed the corporate spin-off of Fifth Third Processing Solutions, which was acquired by Worldpay, Inc. in 2012.

In May 2018, Fifth Third acquired MB Financial in a $4.7 billion transaction.

In August 2020, the bank partnered with Trust & Will.

Two years later, Fifth Third acquired Dividend Finance, a San Francisco–based residential solar power lender. By May 2023, the bank acquired Rize Money. The same month, the bank acquired Big Data Healthcare.

In 2025, Fifth Third was ranked as offering the best mobile banking app experience in a J.D. Power survey.

In June 2026, Fifth Third moved its listing from Nasdaq to the New York Stock Exchange. The bank’s common stock retained its ticker symbol, FITB.

=== Merger with Comerica Bank ===
On October 6, 2025, Fifth Third announced that it signed a definitive agreement to acquire Comerica Bank for $10.9 billion. If approved by regulators, the all-stock deal is expected to close in March 2026; existing Fifth Third shareholders would own about 73% of the combined company, and existing Comerica shareholders would own about 27%. The combined entity would be the ninth-largest bank in the United States, and is reportedly expected to phase out the Comerica brand by 2027.

In December 2025, Crain's Detroit Business reported that 30 Fifth Third locations, primarily in Michigan, are expected to close in 2026 if the acquisition is completed.

On February 1, 2026, Fifth Third and Comerica Bank merged and created the ninth-largest U.S. Bank with about $294 billion in assets. Fifth Third will now operate in 17 of the 20 fastest-growing large markets in the country, including key regions in the Southeast, Texas and California, while solidifying its leadership in the Midwest, the company said in a news release.

It was announced in June 2026 that the company finalized its list of Michigan branch closures, confirming that 75 locations would shut down by September; of those closing, 55 locations were formerly of Comerica Bank. After the closures, 227 branches will still be in operation.

== Lawsuits ==
In September 2015, the U.S. Department of Justice and the Consumer Financial Protection Bureau announced an $18 million settlement to resolve allegations that Fifth Third Bank engaged in a pattern or practice of discrimination against African–American and Hispanic borrowers in its indirect auto lending business.

In December 2016, small business owners sued Fifth Third, along with Vantiv and National Processing Company, for violating telemarketing laws. On August 4, 2022, a $50 million settlement was finalized.

On March 9, 2020, the Consumer Financial Protection Bureau (CFPB) charged Fifth Third with illegal cross-selling; the suit was resolved in 2024 with the bank paying $20 million and taking remedial actions. A class action suit was filed on behalf of former MB Financial shareholders, alleging that the cross-selling strategy artificially inflated Fifth Third's stock price and thus MB Financial's shareholders were not honestly compensated when the purchase occurred. The case was settled on September 14, 2023, with Fifth Third paying former MB Financial shareholders $5.5 million.

On April 27, 2023, a jury ruled Fifth Third breached its Early Access loan program, but customers were not awarded damages because they had been fully informed of the terms. Fifth Third listed the APR estimate of 120%, the actual number was higher if the loan was paid off early due to the fee structure.

On March 8, 2024, the Minnesota Attorney General filed suit against Fifth Third subsidiary Dividend Finance and three other lending companies (GoodLeap, Sunlight Financial, and Solar Mosaic), following an investigation that uncovered they charged Minnesotans $35 million in hidden fees on nearly 5,000 loans to finance sales of residential solar panels. The lawsuit alleged the lenders violated Minnesota state laws against deceptive trade practices, deceptive lending, and illegally high rates of interest.

In November 2025, HoldCo Opportunities Fund V, L.P., a shareholder of Comerica Incorporated, filed a lawsuit in the Delaware Court of Chancery against Comerica, Fifth Third Bancorp, and certain Comerica directors in connection with Fifth Third's proposed $10.9 billion acquisition of Comerica. The lawsuit alleged that Comerica's directors had breached their fiduciary duties in approving the transaction, that Fifth Third had "aided and abetted" the alleged breaches, and that Comerica's disclosures concerning the transaction were incomplete. HoldCo had previously advocated for a sale of Comerica and had identified Fifth Third as a potential acquirer. Comerica and Fifth Third disputed HoldCo's allegations, with Fifth Third's attorneys stating that the claim against the bank lacked merit. In December 2025, Fifth Third CEO Tim Spence stated that he anticipated a resolution to the litigation through the courts, and that he was not concerned that it would prevent the proposed transaction from proceeding. On January 23, 2026, the Delaware Court of Chancery denied HoldCo's motion to forbid the transaction, concluding that HoldCo had not established a basis for the requested injunction.

Two additional lawsuits involving Fifth Third Bank were dismissed in 2026. In June, a federal court dismissed a lawsuit filed by investors in securities issued by Tricolor, an auto loan lender, against Fifth Third and other banks. The lawsuit alleged that the banks failed to address warning signs of fraud. The next month, a federal court dismissed a $2.1 million lawsuit against Fifth Third Bank regarding fraudulent wire transfers.

== Notable corporate buildings ==
- Fifth Third Center in Grand Rapids, Michigan
- Fifth Third Center in Charlotte, North Carolina
- Fifth Third Center in Cincinnati, Ohio
- Fifth Third Center in Cleveland, Ohio
- Fifth Third Center in Columbus, Ohio
- Fifth Third Center at One SeaGate in Toledo, Ohio
- Fifth Third Center in Dayton, Ohio
- Fifth Third Center in Nashville, Tennessee
- Fifth Third Center in Tampa, Florida

== Naming rights and sponsorships ==
Fifth Third owns corporate naming rights to the following:

- Comerica Park, a ballpark in Detroit, Michigan, home of the Detroit Tigers of Major League Baseball, is slated to be renamed Fifth Third Park in 2027 after Comerica Bank was acquired by Fifth Third Bank in February 2026.
- Fifth Third Field, a ballpark in Toledo, Ohio, home of the Toledo Mud Hens, the Triple-A minor league baseball Affiliate of the Detroit Tigers.
- Fifth Third Arena, an indoor arena on the campus of the University of Cincinnati, home of the Cincinnati Bearcats Athletics.
- Fifth Third Arena, an indoor arena in Chicago, Illinois, practice facility and Community Ice Rink of the Chicago Blackhawks of the National Hockey League.
- Fifth Third Bank Stadium, a football stadium in Kennesaw, Georgia, home of the Kennesaw State Owls Athletics.
- Fifth Third Park, a ballpark in Spartanburg, South Carolina, home of the Hub City Spartanburgers, the High-A minor league baseball Affiliate of the Texas Rangers.

Fifth Third Bank is a sponsor of the following:

- Cincinnati Bengals – Official Bank of the Cincinnati Bengals.
- Chicago Blackhawks – Official Partner of the Chicago Blackhawks.
- Detroit Tigers – Official Bank of the Detroit Tigers.
- Tampa Bay Buccaneers– Official Bank of the Tampa Bay Buccaneers.
- Cincinnati Open – Official Partner of the Cincinnati Open.
- Los Angeles Lakers – Official Partner of the Los Angeles Lakers.
- Kennesaw State University – Official Bank of the Kennesaw State Athletics.
- University of Cincinnati – Official Partner of the University of Cincinnati.
- University of Dayton – Official Bank of University of Dayton Athletics.
- Xavier University – Official Partner of Xavier Athletics.
- Toledo Mud Hens – Official Bank of the Toledo Mud Hens.
- Columbus Zoo – Official Bank of the Columbus Zoo.
- Gary SouthShore RailCats – Official Bank of the Gary SouthShore RailCats.
- Hub City Spartanburgers – Official Bank of the Hub City Spartanburgers.
- RFK Racing – Primary Sponsor of the No. 17 Ford Mustang Dark Horse for Chris Buescher in the NASCAR Cup Series.
- Rahal Letterman Lanigan Racing – Official Sponsor of the No. 15 Honda for Graham Rahal in the NTT IndyCar Series.
