= Fourth and Vine Tower =

Skyscraper in downtown Cincinnati, Ohio

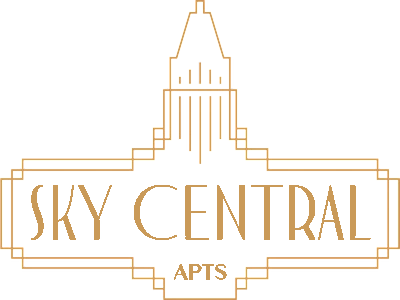

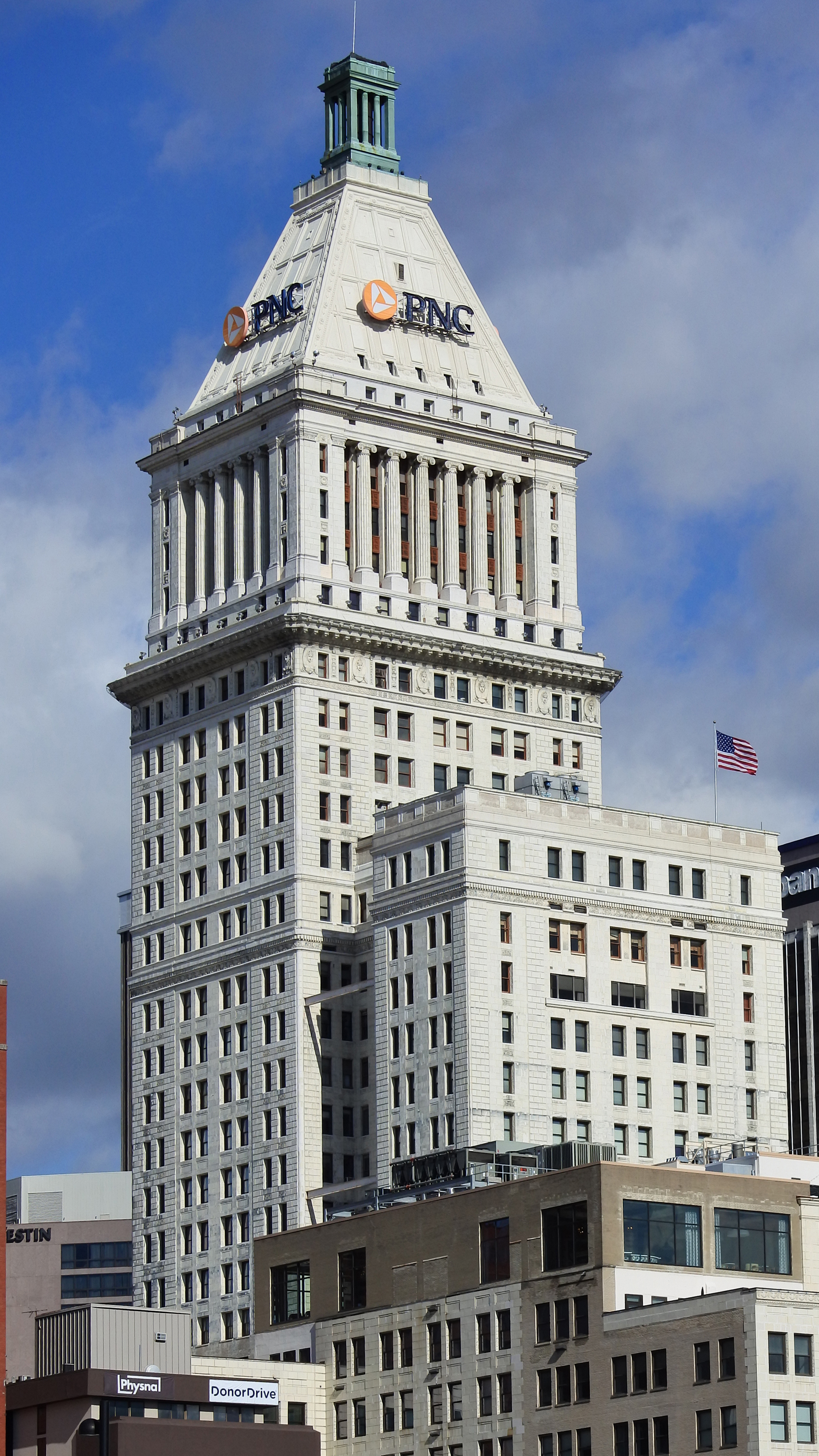
- Fourth and Vine Tower in 2015
- Former names: PNC Bank Tower; Central Trust Bank Tower; Union Central Life Insurance Company Building

Record height
- Tallest in Cincinnati from 1913 to 1930^{[I]}
- Preceded by: Fourth & Walnut Center
- Surpassed by: Carew Tower

General information
- Type: Residential
- Architectural style: Neoclassical
- Location: 1 West 4th Street; Cincinnati, Ohio
- Coordinates: 39.099556°N 84.512967°W
- Construction started: 1912
- Completed: 1913
- Cost: $3 million ($97.7 million in 2025)

Height
- Roof: 151 m (495 ft)

Technical details
- Floor count: 31
- Lifts/elevators: 6

Design and construction
- Architects: Cass Gilbert; Garber & Woodward
- Developer: Union Central Life Insurance Company
- Engineer: Gunvald Aus
- Main contractor: Thompson–Starrett Company
- Fourth and Vine Tower
- U.S. Historic district – Contributing property
- Part of: West Fourth Street Historic District (ID76001443, 07000028)
- Designated CP: February 7, 2007
- Union Central Life Insurance Company Building Annex
- U.S. Historic district – Contributing property
- Cincinnati Local Historic Landmark
- Part of: West Fourth Street Historic District (ID07000028, 15000326)

Significant dates
- Designated CP: June 8, 2015
- Designated CLHL: February 11, 2015

The Fourth and Vine Tower is a 31-story, 495-foot (151 m) neoclassical skyscraper in downtown Cincinnati, Ohio. The tallest building in Cincinnati from 1913 until the opening of the Carew Tower in 1930, it was also the fifth-tallest building in the world upon its completion.

The site of the tower was previously occupied by the headquarters of Cincinnati's Chamber of Commerce, which was devastated by a fire in January 1911. Later that year, the Chamber accepted an offer by the Union Central Life Insurance Company to construct a new building on the site. Union Central hired New York City-based Cass Gilbert as the project's principal architect, with local firm Garber & Woodward as an associate. The tower shared many contractors with Gilbert's Woolworth Building in New York, including the Thompson–Starrett Company, which became the primary contractor. Construction began in 1912 and concluded the following year at a cost of over $3 million ($97.7 million in 2025). The tower opened as the Union Central Building, with Union Central as its owner and primary occupant.

The Central Trust Company, a banking institution, leased space in the tower in 1918. An annex for the tower opened in 1928 to accommodate Union Central's expanded workforce. The building became the Central Trust Bank Tower after Union Central left in 1964. Central Trust left the tower in 1979, but the building retained its name and signage. The signage was changed to that of Central Trust's parent company, PNC Bank, in 1993, and the building was labeled "PNC Tower" by some in the media. Beginning with Union Central's sale of the building in 1958, the tower changed owners multiple times before it was acquired by Central Trust Tower Associates in 1995, which subsequently renamed the building the Fourth and Vine Tower.

In 2014, the annex was purchased by Village Green, which announced plans to convert it into a mixed-use building with residential apartments, amenities, retail, and office space. Developer City Club Apartments LLC took over the project in 2016, and the converted annex opened as City Club Apartments in 2018. City Club acquired the mostly vacant Fourth and Vine Tower in 2019 and announced that it would also be converted into a mixed-use building, but the project was sold to an entrepreneur in 2024 amidst financial difficulties. The converted tower opened as Sky Central in 2025, and the City Club Apartments building entered foreclosure and was renamed the Parisian on Vine that year.

== History ==
=== Planning and construction ===
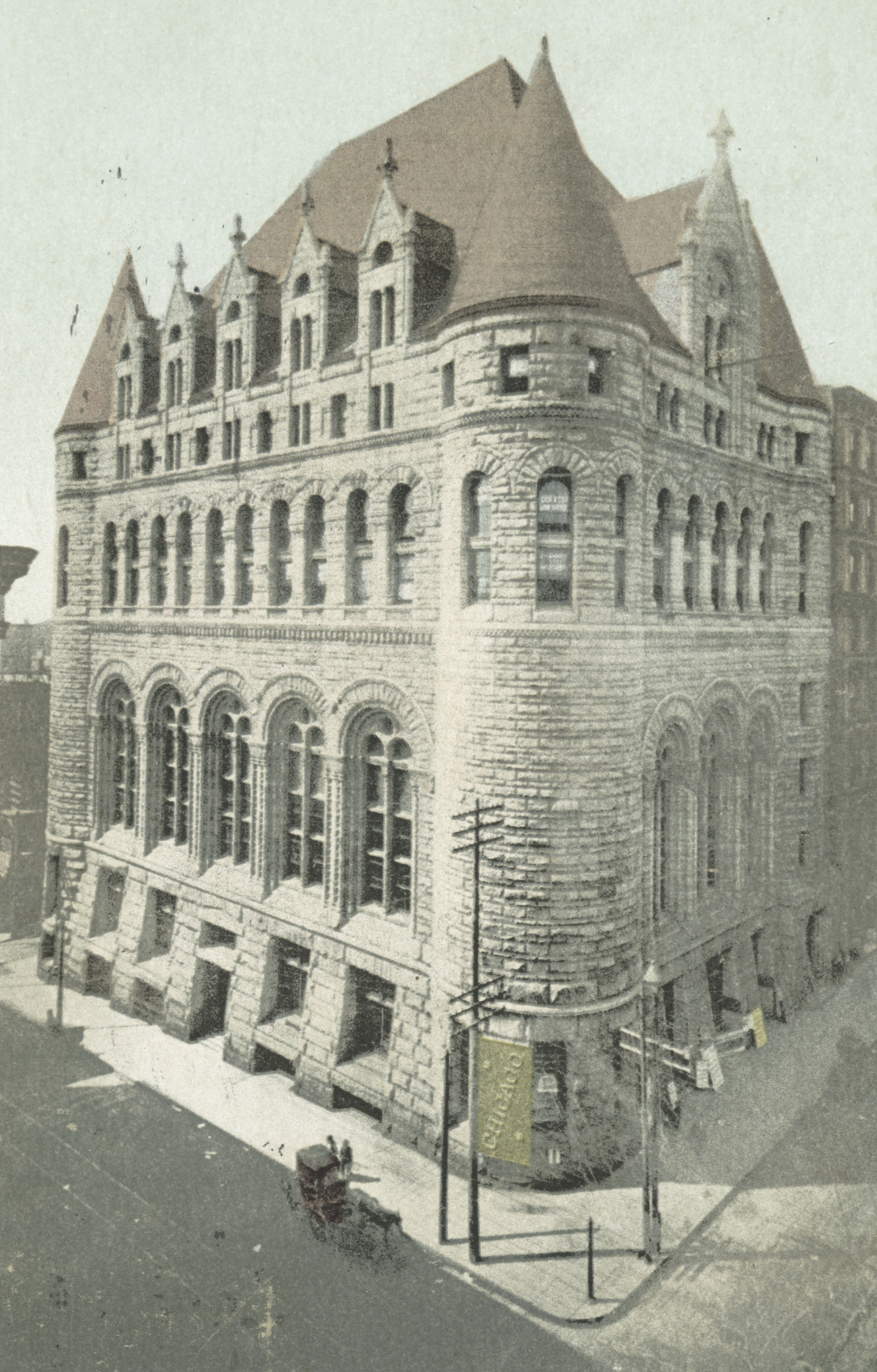
The headquarters of the Cincinnati Chamber of Commerce, which the Fourth and Vine Tower replaced

The site of the Fourth and Vine Tower was previously occupied by the Chamber of Commerce building, which was devastated by a fire on January 10, 1911. In April, the Union Central Life Insurance Company submitted a proposal for the site's future to the Chamber. Union Central would assume control of the site, construct a new building with one or two floors reserved for the Chamber, and pay the Chamber $5000 ($172,768 in 2025) a year. On June 29, Union Central acquired a 25-year lease to the Chamber property with the privilege of purchasing it for $550,000 ($19 million in 2025). Union Central announced a plan to construct a new skyscraper on the site, which would be "a big one" and "an ornament to the city". By July 15, Union Central had agreed to reserve the second and third floors of the new building for the Chamber.

Union Central considered hiring architect Daniel Burnham to design the building, but decided against it due to the fact that Burnham had already designed many buildings in the city. Boston architect Clarence H. Blackall was also considered. Union Central became impressed with New York City-based architect Cass Gilbert after learning of his West Street Building. On July 29, Union Central president Jesse R. Clark announced that Gilbert had been hired to design the building and Frederick S. Holmes designed the bank vault. Cincinnati firm Garber & Woodward was hired as an associate architect. Seeking to work closely with Garber & Woodward, Gilbert evenly split his 6% architect's fee with the firm and requested that it contribute an equal amount of work to the project. By late July, the building was expected to cost $1 million ($34.6 million in 2025) and reach 18 or 20 stories in height. On September 23, Clark announced that work on the 27-story tower would begin in 75 days, by which time the remnants of the Chamber of Commerce building were expected to be demolished. On October 9, The Cincinnati Post reported that the project would be issued a construction permit "in a few days".

Gilbert and Clark had a poor relationship, with Clark acting as a "demanding client". Scheduling issues meant that Gilbert had to negotiate with Clark alone, and Gilbert told Garber & Woodward that the negotiating process was "one of the hardest things he had ever done". Gilbert sought to persuade Clark to adopt a fixed-price contract for construction that would deliver the building by a set time, which Gilbert had arranged for his Woolworth Building in New York. Clark initially opposed this proposal, and the prolonged nature of the ensuing negotiations led to "restless[ness]" among the companies seeking the construction contract. These companies included the Thompson–Starrett Company, the George A. Fuller Company, Jason Stewart and Company, and the Hedden Construction Company. Jason Stewart was removed from contention after a company representative, frustrated by the delay in selecting a contract type, stated that he wanted "to put a rope around Clark's neck". On January 13, 1912, Clark announced that Thompson–Starrett had been awarded the construction contract. The estimated cost of the building was $2 million ($66.7 million in 2025) at the time. Thompson–Starrett had worked with Gilbert on the Woolworth Building, and Gilbert selected several other Woolworth collaborators as contractors, including engineer Gunvald Aus, the American Bridge Company for steel, and the Atlantic Terra Cotta Company. Union Central sought to build the tower quickly, especially after learning of a potential bill in the Ohio state legislature that would restrict the height of buildings to 12 stories. Clark specifically stated that the tower should be complete within a year, but Gilbert did not believe that this goal was attainable.

Groundbreaking occurred on February 22. On February 27, Clark stated that an additional five floors would be added to the existing plans, bringing the tower to 31 stories. The first steel column was set on May 16. 275 men, representing the bulk of the tower's workforce, went on strike on August 26 after marble from a nonunion quarry in Proctor, Vermont arrived at the site. Stating that the Thompson–Starrett Co. would pay 15 union stonecutters to handle the marble, a union official called off the strike on September 11, though a Thompson–Starrett official denied that his company had agreed to the concession. Work on several large projects in Cincinnati, including the Union Central tower, was interrupted by the beginning of another strike on September 13. The strike, which was triggered by a dispute between the International Association of Steamfitters and the United Association of Plumbers and Steamfitters, involved about 2000 workers across all involved projects, though some professions were exempt from the strike. The strike ended on September 28 after the Thompson–Starrett Co. agreed to only employ United Association steamfitters.

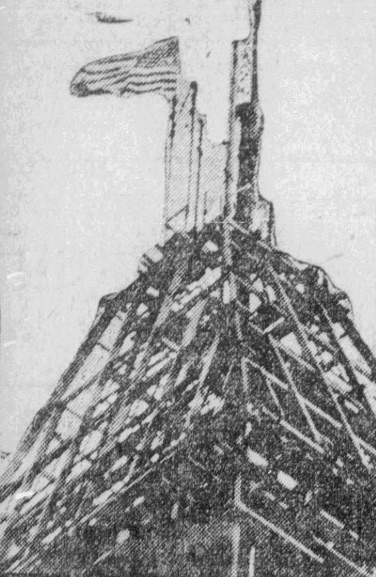
An American flag flying over the tower after its topping out on December 13, 1912

At the building's cornerstone-setting ceremony on October 23, Clark stated that the construction of the tower was a step towards a more "progressive Cincinnati". The day prior, Clark had been inducted into the Stone Cutters' Union so that he could "lay the stone as a union man". October 23 also saw the project's first work-related fatality. The tower topped out on December 13. By January 22, 1913, four workers had died over the course of construction. May 1 saw only "minor" May Day actions by labor, with 70-80 ironworkers going on strike after being refused a raise. The Post reported that a resolution to the strike was "expected" the following day. The tower was slated to open to the public on June 1, with construction lasting less than 14 months. The final cost of the skyscraper was over $3 million ($97.7 million in 2025).

When construction of the building was completed in 1913, the Union Central Tower was the fifth-tallest building in the world and the 2nd tallest building (tallest office building) outside of New York City. It remained the tallest building in Cincinnati until 1930, when construction on the Carew Tower was completed.

=== Commercial use ===
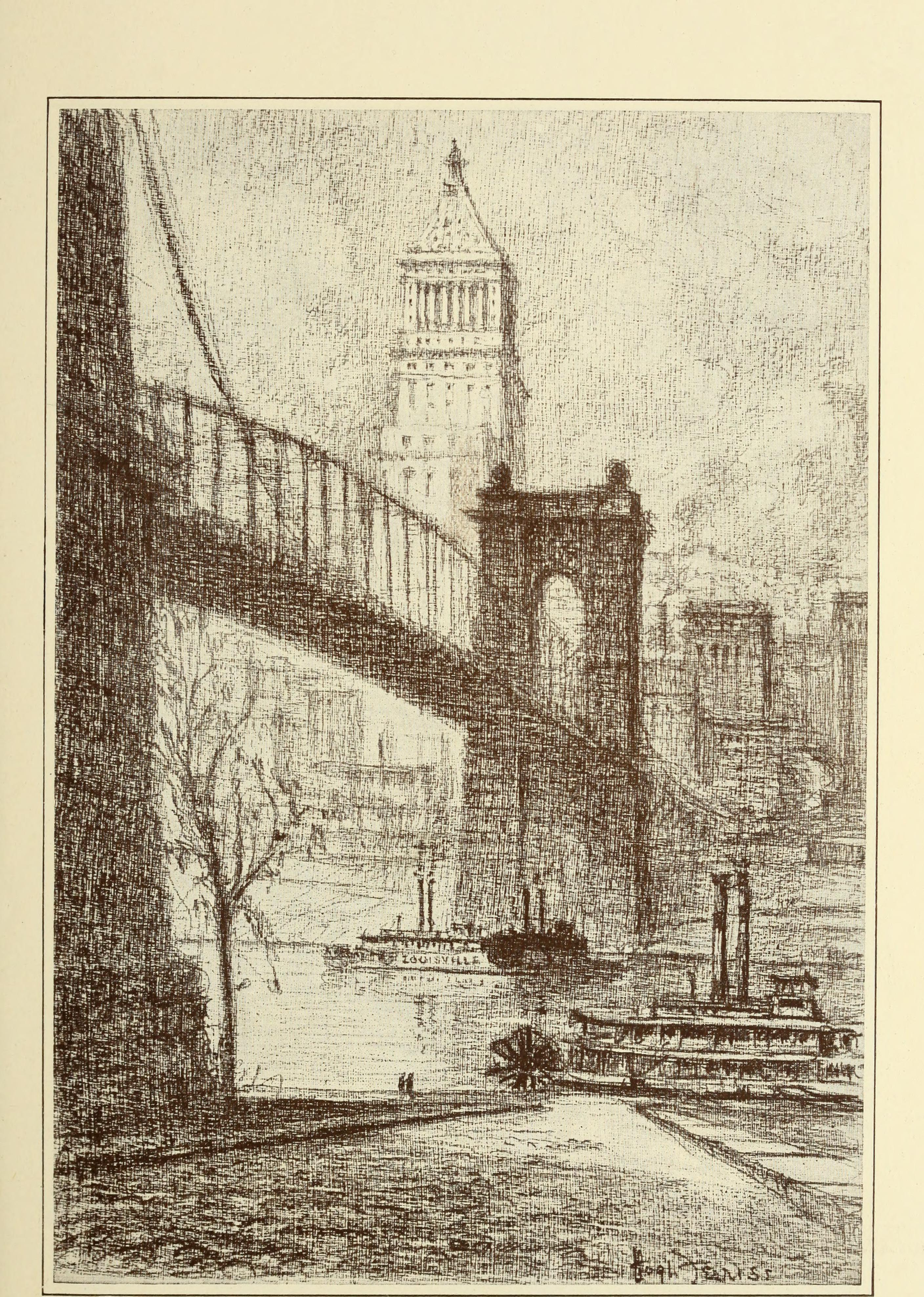
"The Queen City on the Ohio": drawing of Cincinnati in a 1919 volume of Harper's Magazine, showing the Union Central Building with the Roebling Bridge in the foreground

The Union Central Building's official opening date was set for June 1, 1913, though some tenants were already present in the tower by late May. The building was 64% leased by May 25. Architectural firm Garber & Woodward, which had been an associate architect for the tower, moved into the building on May 31. Tower owner and principal occupant Union Central planned to move into the building in "the latter part of June". A new substation of the United States Weather Bureau, which was announced in December 1911, was set to open in the tower shortly after June 21. The dedication ceremony for the Chamber of Commerce's quarters in the building was held on June 26, with Cincinnati Mayor Henry Thomas Hunt and former U.S. President William Howard Taft as speakers. The Cincinnati City Council declared June 25 and 26 to be "quasi-legal" holidays in honor of the Chamber's move. A banquet in the 17th-floor library was held on November 7 to dedicate the skyscraper itself, with Clark, Hunt, and Ohio Governor James M. Cox among the speakers. The management of the Chesapeake and Ohio Railway signed a ten-year lease in late November and began moving to the seventh floor in December, as negotiations had complicated its plan to move to the tower by June 1.

In June 1918, the Central Trust Company announced that it would be leasing much of the Union Central Building's ground floor. The bank's lease was slated to last for 20 years with the privilege of an additional 20 years. The Chamber of Commerce's lease was set to expire on July 1, 1923, but Union Central sought to divide the Chamber's quarters into offices before that date. Union Central offered the Chamber a $12,000 ($230,815 in 2025) bonus if it left the tower before November 1, 1922, which the Chamber accepted. By November 1923, Central Trust occupied much of the second floor space that had been vacated by the Chamber.

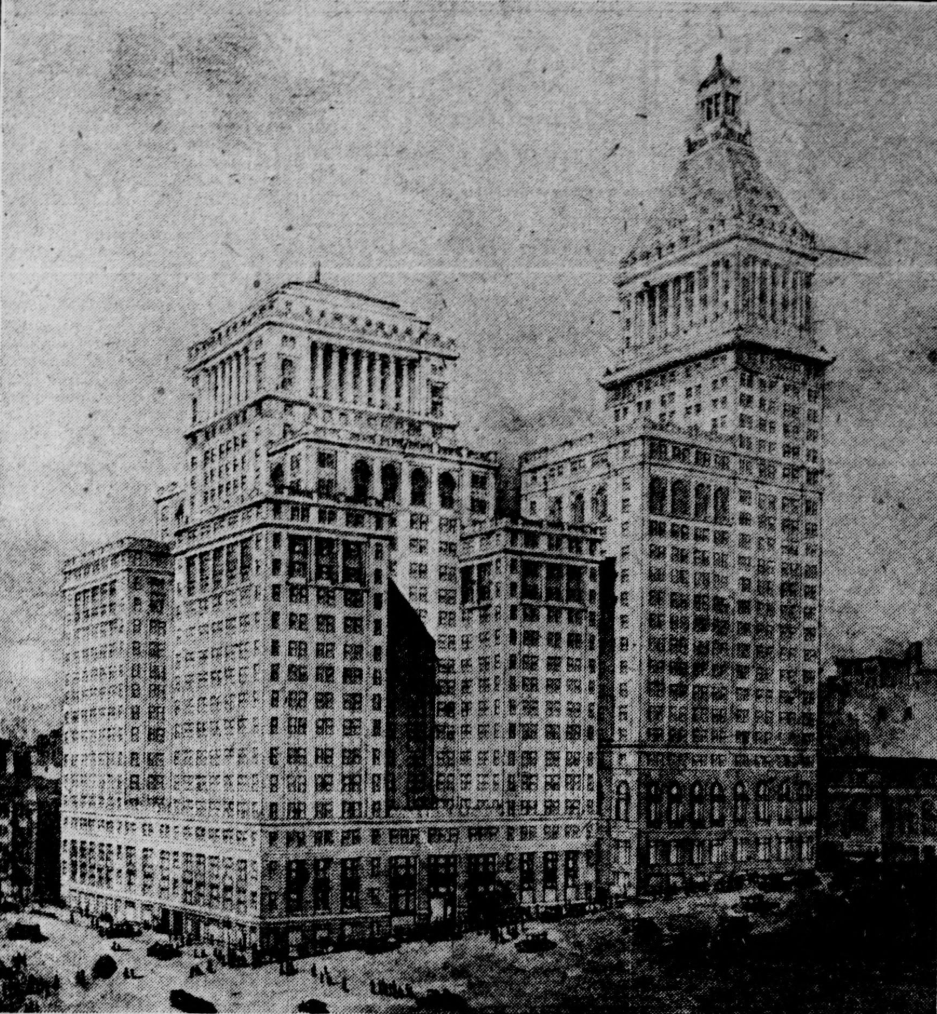
Drawing of the proposed annex

By 1926, Union Central had 719 employees at the tower, nearly double its 1913 count of 363. Seeking to expand its office space, Union Central purchased the adjacent Burnet House hotel in January of that year in order to construct an annex for the tower. Garber & Woodward was hired to design the annex. On April 27, Union Central announced that its Building Committee had approved the project. Demolition of the Burnet House began on July 16 and was largely complete by mid-October. The contract for the annex's construction was awarded in December. Work on the $4 million project was scheduled to begin on December 6 and conclude by October 15, 1927. Only 7 floors were planned for the initial phase of construction, with the building slated to eventually rise to 26 floors as Union Central expanded its business. The annex was dedicated on January 17, 1928, by which time eight and a half stories were complete. The annex only grew to a height of 10 stories, as plans to expand the building to 26 stories were abandoned after the 1929 stock market crash and subsequent Great Depression.

In 1929, a 24-inch Carlisle & Finch aviation beacon was installed on top of the building as a visual navigation aid for Lunken Airport. The five million candlepower beam was visible from 50 miles (80 km) away on a clear night.

On February 2, 1939, the Provident Savings Bank & Trust Co. sold the Electric Building at 8 West Fourth Street to "W. Lyman Case" for $200,000 ($4.63 million in 2025). According to the Post, "reports maintained" that Union Central had purchased the building, which would be demolished to make room for a new addition for the Central Trust Company. Plans for the three-story addition were announced on August 2. Central Trust also began a major remodel of its existing offices. Central Trust announced the completion of the remodel and its pending occupation of the addition on July 22, 1941. During World War II, the annex was occupied, at least in part, by the headquarters of the Ferrying Division of the Air Transport Command.

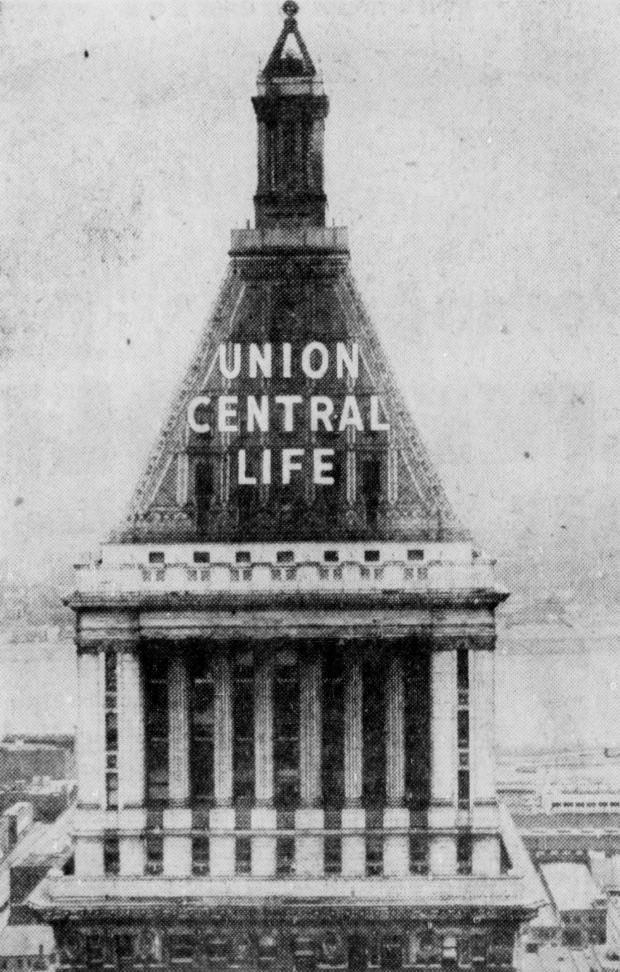
1956 proposal for "Union Central Life" signage

In 1955, the Chamber of Commerce stated that it would return to the building on May 27 after signing a five-year lease to part of the 17th floor. On August 8, 1956, Union Central announced that it would add "Union Central Life" signage to the top of the building, with the company's president stating "we believe in downtown Cincinnati and are happy to take this step in lighting Cincinnati's downtown skyline". The signage was in place by April of the following year.

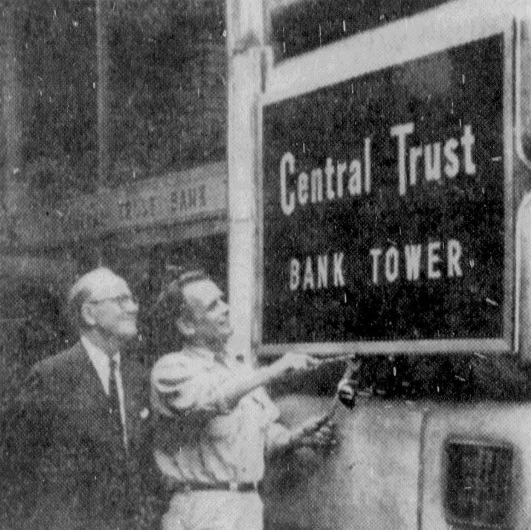
Installation of "Central Trust Bank Tower" signage in April 1964

On September 8, 1958, Union Central expressed its intent to open a new headquarters in a suburban location and announced that its downtown buildings were for sale. On December 15, New York City investors Robert Arnow and Brooks, Harvey & Co. purchased the tower for $9.7 million ($108 million in 2025). The Equitable Life Assurance Society gave the investors a 25-year, $7 million ($78.1 million in 2025) mortgage. The new owners leased the tower back to Union Central as it worked on its headquarters in Forest Park. On December 3, 1963, tenants were informed that the Union Central Building and its annex would respectively become the "Central Trust Bank Tower" and the "Central Trust Building" once Union Central left the properties. Union Central moved to its Forest Park location in 1964, and the Union Central Building was renamed on April 27 of that year.

On June 5, 1969, the tower and annex were purchased by Cinpen Associates, a New York investment group, for $15 million ($132 million in 2025). On May 27, 1976, Cinpen sold the buildings to Manuel D. Mayerson of Manuel D. Mayerson Associates for over $10 million ($56.6 million in 2025). The official buyer was the Quonset Realty Co. Mayerson referred to the 1969 sale price as "inflated" due to the involvement of additional properties and a leaseback deal, stating that "the real value of the property has gone up". On September 24, Scripps-Howard Newspapers stated that it would be moving its headquarters from New York to Cincinnati, leasing three floors in the Central Trust Tower. On November 30, Central Trust announced plans for a new skyscraper called Central Trust Center. In January 1979, Aetna announced that it had a 10-year lease to the sixth and seventh floors of Central Trust Tower, which were occupied by accounting firm Arthur Young & Co. at the time. Aetna planned to move to the tower after Arthur Young's projected move to the Central Trust Center that summer. Central Bancorporation, Central Trust's parent company, vacated 100,000 square feet in its old tower when it moved to the Central Trust Center in March, but vacancy was less than 2% by July. The Central Trust Tower was slated to retain its signage despite Central Trust's move.

On December 4, 1984, Mayerson sold five downtown buildings, including the Central Trust Tower and the Clopay Building, to New York financial services firm Integrated Resources, Inc. Under the deal, Mayerson sold two of his companies, Quonset Realty and Cin-May Realty, to Integrated Resources affiliate Somnat Corp. Somnat then transferred the buildings owned by Mayerson's companies to the limited partnership Clovine Associates for $72 million ($223 million in 2025), but the price of this transfer had "no bearing" on the undisclosed sum received by Mayerson for his companies. The buildings were collectively valued at just under $22 million ($68.2 million in 2025) at the time. Management of the buildings was projected to remain with Mayerson Associates, which Mayerson stated was a prerequisite for the sale.

PNC acquired Central Trust in 1988. On September 17, 1992, PNC announced it would scrap the independent branding of its various banks in favor of the PNC Bank name. As part of this rebranding, the Central Trust Tower was slated to adopt PNC signage. The lights on the old sign were turned off for the last time at 6:00 a.m. on February 8, 1993. Workers began removing the Central Trust sign, which the Post referred to as "a Cincinnati landmark", on February 10. PNC signs on three sides of the building were operational by late May, but the Ohio Department of Natural Resources requested that the lighting of the sign on the tower's eastern face be delayed due to the presence of an endangered peregrine falcon nest. All four signs were planned to be illuminated on July 19. The building was projected to officially retain the "Central Trust Tower" name, but articles in The Cincinnati Enquirer and The Greater Cincinnati Business Record referred to the building as "PNC Tower" that year.

Integrated Resources filed for bankruptcy in February 1990. On January 4, 1991, The Travelers Insurance Co. filed two foreclosure lawsuits against five downtown buildings owned by Clovine Associates, including the Central Trust Tower. Travelers stated that Clovine took out a $34.7 ($108 million in 2025) million mortgage on the Central Trust Tower, which was subsequently refinanced with a $1.76 million amended note. Travelers stated that it was owed more than $62 million ($147 million in 2025) in total. A judge appointed Matthews, Click, Bauman Inc. of Columbus as the receiver of the buildings. The tower was about 80% occupied at the time. In March, five Clovine investors filed a class action lawsuit against Integrated Resources, stating that Integrated had misrepresented the value of the buildings ahead of the 1984 sale. The plaintiffs sought full reimbursement for themselves and 315 other investors. In August, the plaintiffs amended their suit to include complaints of racketeering and securities fraud.

Travelers assumed ownership of the tower and its annex on January 26, 1993. In May 1994, The Cincinnati Enquirer stated that the American Financial Corp. was "rumored" to be interested in purchasing Central Trust Tower. In July, the Enquirer reported that the potential sale was called off, and Travelers withdrew the building from sale in September. In September 1995, S.N. Phelps & Co. of Greenwich, Connecticut purchased the tower for $5.75 million ($12.1 million in 2025). At the time, the tower was 79% occupied, while the annex was about half occupied. Central Trust Tower Associates was listed as the official buyer, and it legally owned the tower as a subsidiary of Phelps by 1997. By that year, the tower had been renamed the "Fourth and Vine Tower". The annex was likewise renamed the "309 Vine Building", with Phelps discouraging the "annex" label so that it could be marketed as a distinct property.

In 2007, the boundaries of the West Fourth Street Historic District were expanded to include the Fourth and Vine Tower, which was listed as a contributing property of the historic district. The annex was mentioned in the 2007 expansion, but was not listed as a contributing property until a 2015 amendment. The amendment stated that the annex "should have been included" in the 2007 expansion, as it fell within the district's period of significance and was physically connected to the tower.

In May 2012, the Enquirer reported that Central Trust Tower Associates was planning a $15 million renovation of the 309 Vine Building, which would be the first major work done on the structure since its 1995 acquisition. The owners expressed a desire for the renovation, coupled with the development of the Banks along the riverfront to the south, to attract new renters to the annex, which only had four tenants at the time. The renovation was projected to be begin that summer and conclude by the end of the year. In late 2013, Central Trust Tower Associates sold the 309 Vine Building to Third & Vine Partners LLC for $6.07 million.

=== Residential conversion ===
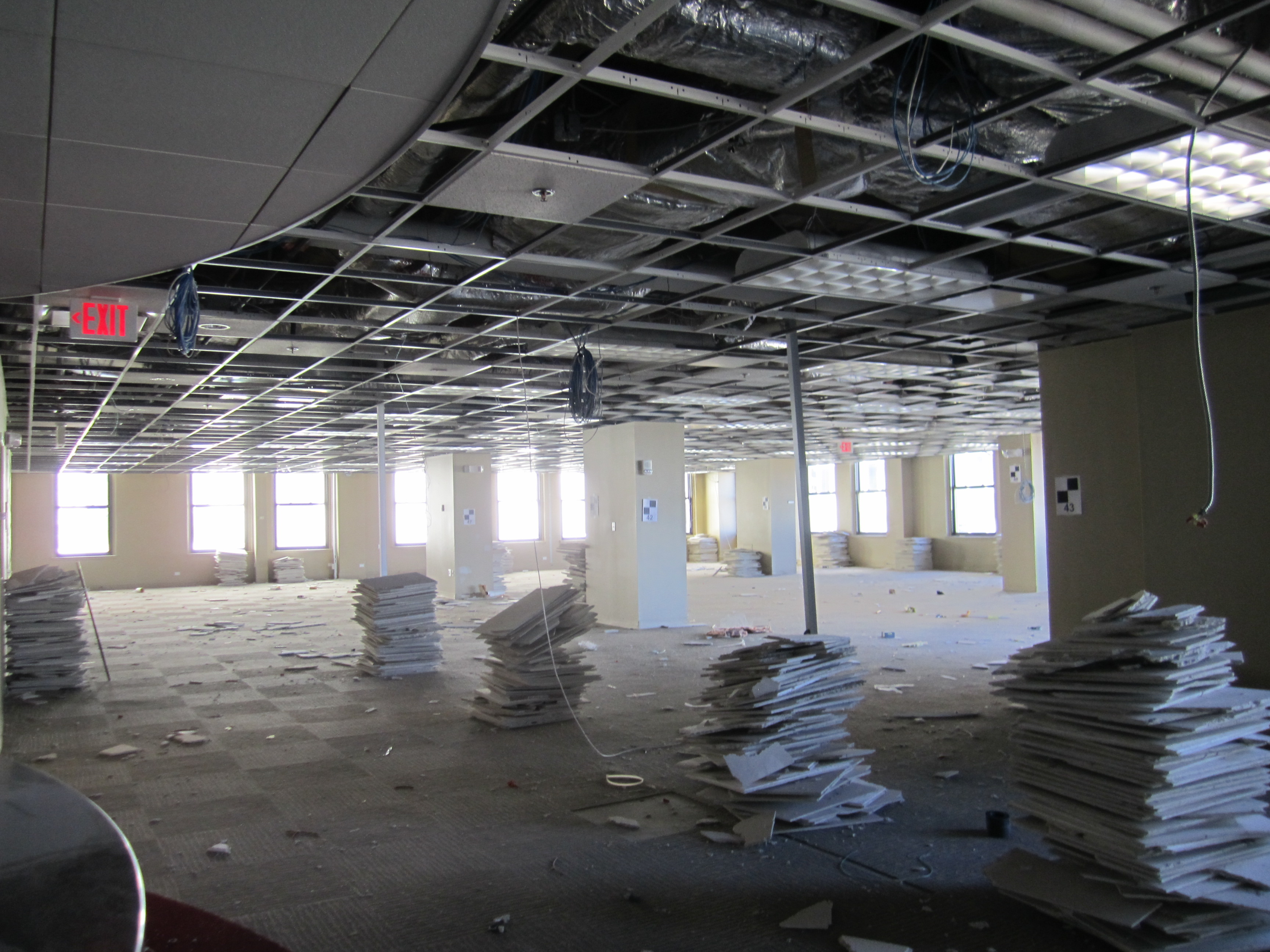
Interior of the annex in 2015

On October 30, 2014, the annex was sold to luxury apartment manager Village Green, which announced plans for a mixed-use conversion of the building. Village Green's CEO left the company in June 2016 and subsequently established Detroit-based City Club Apartments LLC. City Club assumed control of the conversion, though Village Green was still projected to manage the building. The project broke ground on July 15. The land beneath the annex was owned by the Port of Greater Cincinnati Development Authority, which entered into a ground lease with City Club. The converted annex, named City Club Apartments, opened in April 2018 with 294 apartment units, retail, and 45,000 square feet of office space. The final cost of the project was about $67 million.

By June 2019, City Club was planning a $103.5 million residential conversion of the main portion of Fourth and Vine Tower, which was 70% vacant at the time. The converted building would feature 262 apartment units, 10% of which would be affordable, as well as 30,000 square feet of retail space. The revamped Fourth and Vine Tower would also be directly integrated with the City Club Apartments building. City Club sought a $2.5 million forgivable loan and a 30-year tax increment financing (TIF) agreement from the Cincinnati City Council. In exchange, City Club would contribute $9.69 million to Cincinnati Public Schools and $4.83 million to the Cincinnati streetcar over the course of the financing agreement. On June 7, the Cincinnati Planning Commission unanimously voted to recommend transferring the tower from Central Trust Tower Associates to City Club. In order for the project to qualify for the TIF deal, the building was first purchased by a City Club affiliate for $11.5 million, transferred to the city, and then transferred back to City Club by September. In December, the state of Ohio granted City Club a $5 million tax credit for historic preservation.

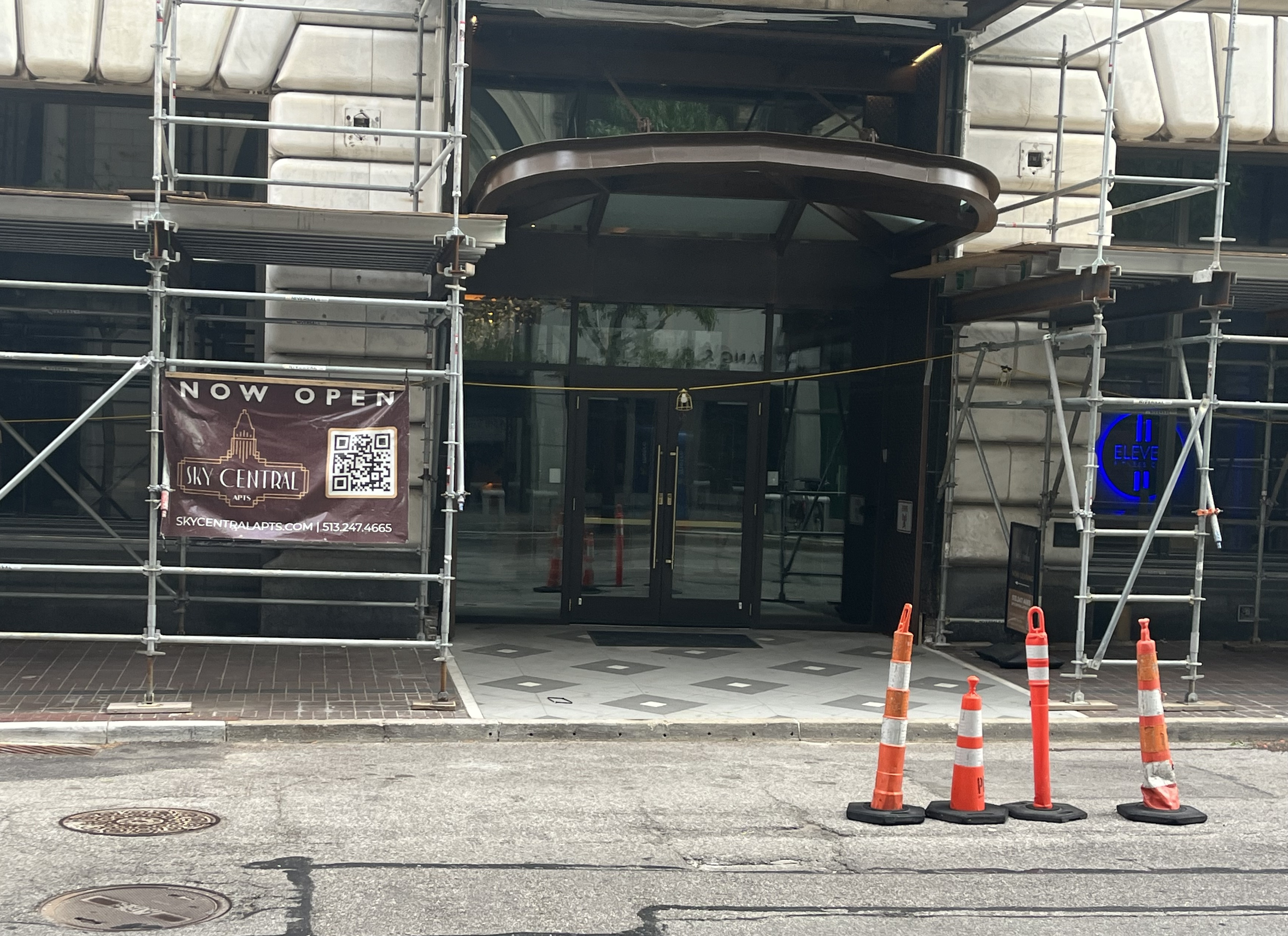
Entrance to Sky Central

By March 2021, plans for the conversion called for a mixed-use "city within a city", with approximately 300 apartments, retail space, and a variety of amenities. Work on the conversion was scheduled to begin by the end of the month and conclude within 17 months. The project, named City Club Apartments Union Central (CCAUC), was delayed by the COVID-19 pandemic and its impact on construction costs and interest rates. The project missed its planned 2022 opening, with work only beginning in June of that year. By then, CCAUC was expected to cost $90 million and to open to residents in the third quarter of 2023. In September, the project received a $76.5 million loan from Fifth Third Bank. The state of Ohio also gave the developer a $2 million grant for brownfield environmental remediation, a $2.5 million development loan, and a $2.75 million water development loan. The city of Cincinnati extended CCAUC's opening deadline to mid-2025 as part of the TIF deal.

In July 2024, financial difficulties led City Club to sell the CCUAC project to entrepreneur Stanley Dickson of Detroit, who had previously been an investor in the conversion. Dickson announced that CCAUC would be renamed Sky Central while retaining the PNC signage. Plans for integration with the City Club Apartments annex were canceled; Sky Central would not be managed by Village Green, the Detroit-based manager of the annex apartments, and residents of the two buildings would not share amenities. Its new opening date was set for June 2025.

The first apartments in Sky Central were scheduled to open in February 2025, by which time the first 11 floors of units were complete. Cincinnati-based Towne Properties was responsible for leasing and management. 40 parking spots were available in a basement garage, with additional parking in exterior garages. A private fitness center opened in the building in January, and residents would also have access to Sky Central's own gym. The "tenant hub" on the 19th floor, featuring a pool, lounge, conference room, and other amenities, was slated to open in May. The building's phased opening was projected to continue until August.

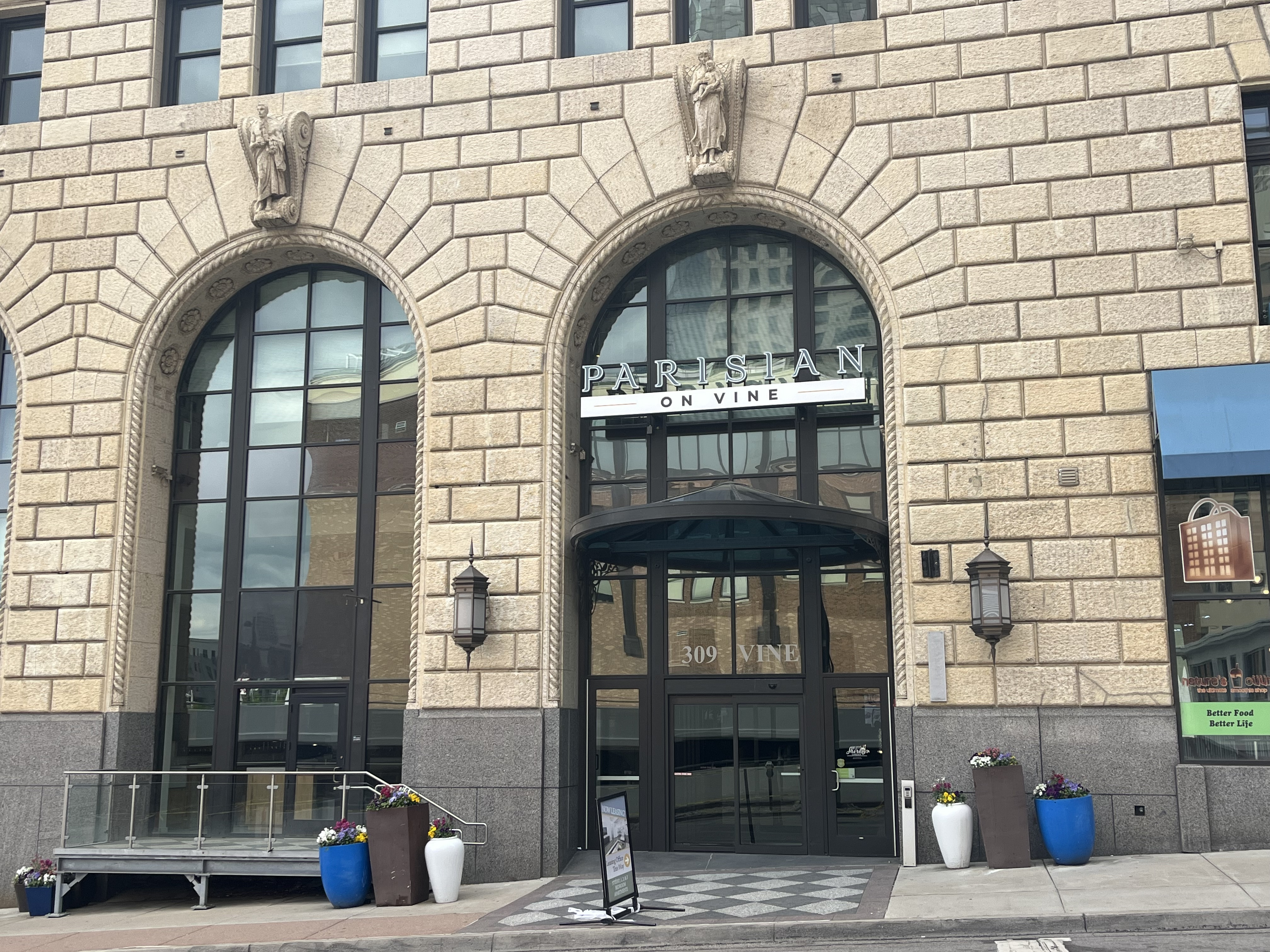
Entrance to the Parisian on Vine

On June 27, 2025, ACREC 2021-FL1 Ltd. filed a $79 million foreclosure lawsuit against City Club Apartments. The suit stated that Asia Capital Real Estate Management gave City Club a $68.5 million mortgage in August 2020, with ownership of the loan later passing to ACREC. Its original maturity date of August 9, 2022 was delayed twice, with a final deadline of April 9, 2025. ACREC notified City Club that it was in default in April, and Dallas-based Trigild was appointed as the annex's receiver on June 18. In October, real estate firm CBRE listed the annex for sale without an asking price. By then, the building had been renamed the Parisian on Vine.

== Architecture ==
The four-story base of the tower is made of rusticated white marble. The lower levels feature tall, arched windows, which are accompanied by low-relief metal panels and voussoirs. The upper floors of the exterior consist of polychromatic white glazed terracotta. The upper stories feature "lavish" decoration, including foliated mutules, cartouches, dentillation, and egg-and-dart molding. Above the 23rd floor, all four sides of the facade feature Ionic columns in antis with squared pilasters in the corners. The top of the building features a copper temple-like structure that conceals a smokestack. Architectural inspirations for the building included the Mausoleum at Halicarnassus, St Mark's Campanile, and the Bankers Trust Company Building.

== See also ==
- List of tallest buildings in Cincinnati
