= Stephen Carter (architect) =

American architect

Stephen J. Carter
- Born: 1945 (age 80–81); Cincinnati, Ohio, U.S.
- Education: University of Cincinnati College of Design, Architecture, Art, and Planning (1969), Harvard Graduate School of Design, Loeb Fellowship (1982)
- Occupation: Architect
- Awards: 2 Progressive Architecture Awards, 12 AIA Ohio Honor Awards, 10 AIA Dayton Honor Awards, Operation Resurrection (a monument to H.H. Richardson)
- Practice: Principal in Lorenz and Williams Incorporated (1970 - 2009)
- Buildings: National Aviation Hall of Fame, NCR Corporation World Headquarters (Dayton, Ohio) master plan, MetLife Midwestern Headquarters, Ohio State University Main Library, Eli Lilly and Company HQ Historic Restoration, Xavier University Graduate Student Housing, SCC Center for Integrated Learning, SunWatch Indian Village Interpretive Center, Carillon Historical Park, River Design Dayton
- Projects: Schuster Heart Hospital for Kettering Medical Center.

Stephen J. Carter, AIA, NCARB, LF'82 (born 1945 in Cincinnati, Ohio) is an American architect.

== Biography ==
Carter was born in Cincinnati, Ohio. He received degrees from the University of Cincinnati College of Design, Architecture, Art, and Planning and Harvard Graduate School of Design, where he was Loeb Fellow in 1981 and 1982. As a student Carter won a design competition held in 1968 for the memorial to Henry Hobson Richardson's Greater Cincinnati Chamber of Commerce building. The memorial was completed in 1972 and resides in Burnet Woods.

Carter taught and/or lectured in the Architectural programs at Ohio State University, The University of Cincinnati, Harvard University and Miami University of Ohio where he was a Graduate Design Studio Head for 19 years. His teaching experience accrued while he practiced full-time at Lorenz and Williams Incorporated (LWI) in Dayton, Ohio. Carter became an LWI partner in 1982 and CEO/Chairman of the Board from 1999 to 2005. He is now a Partner Emeritus.

Carter has worked on projects as the LWI team member in association with other notable architects including; Charles Willard Moore, Michael Graves, Peter Eisenman, Thom Mayne and James Ingo Freed. These associations provided an opportunity to participate in a wide variety of philosophical design approaches enriching his practice and teaching.

Carter has designed project types including; Corporate Headquarters, Restoration & Adaptive reuse, libraries, medical centers, public spaces and civic centers, cultural facilities, education, K-12 and universities.

Some of his most notable designs include; The National Aviation Hall of Fame, NCR Corporation World Headquarters (Dayton, Ohio) master plan, MetLife Midwestern Headquarters, Ohio State University Main Library, Eli Lilly and Company Headquarters Historic Restoration, Xavier University Graduate Student Housing, SCC Center for Integrated Learning, SunWatch Indian Village Interpretive Center, Carillon Historical Park and River Design Dayton. His latest project is Schuster Heart Hospital for Kettering Medical Center.

Carter won the Progressive Architecture Award twice (1975, 1977), the American Institute of Architects Ohio Honor Award twelve times, the American Institute of Architects Dayton Honor Award ten times, Operation Resurrection a monument to Henry Hobson Richardson and numerous other awards and honors. His work has been featured in articles in French, German, Japanese and American magazines and periodicals including; Progressive Architecture, Architectural Record, Urban Design, JA, Baumeister, Architecture Intérieure Créé and Rizzoli International Publications.

Carter has served in the various officer positions of American Institute of Architects. He was President of the Dayton Chapter of the AIA in 1982, served on the AIA Ohio Board and was in charge of the AIA Honor Awards Program at the State Convention in Cleveland, Ohio. He was most recently the Lowcountry Director of the South Carolina chapter of the American Institute of Architects. He resides and practices on Hilton Head Island, SC. His practice is focused on design/master planning consultation on a wide variety of project types.

== Selected projects ==
The following are projects in which Carter's main role was designer/principal in charge.

CORPORATE HEADQUARTERS

- Metropolitan Life Midwestern Head Office, Miamisburg, Ohio 1977
- NCR Corporation World Headquarters Planning and Programming, Dayton, Ohio 1977
- NCR Corporation Regional Office, Cleveland, Ohio 1982
- L. M. Berry (Yellow Pages) South Central Area Headquarters, Birmingham, Alabama 1984
- The Children's Place Headquarters & National Distribution Center, Montville Township, New Jersey 1986

RESTORATION & ADAPTIVE REUSE

- Old Post Office, Restoration for Lorenz & Williams Incorporated Office, Dayton, Ohio 1979
- Arcade Square (Dayton Arcade), Retail Center, Dayton, Ohio 1980
- Chemineer Incorporated, Corporate Headquarters, Kuhns Building Renovation, Dayton, Ohio 1981
- Eli Lilly and Company, Remodeling Building 13/21, Indianapolis, Indiana 1987

LIBRARIES

- Ohio State University William Oxley Thompson Library, Columbus, Ohio 1977
- Middletown Public Library, Middletown, Ohio 1981
- United Theological Seminary Learning Resource Center Design, Library/Faculty Office Building, Dayton, Ohio 1985
- Clark County Public Library, Springfield, Ohio 1989

MEDICAL

- St. Elizabeth Medical Center, Dayton, Ohio, 1974
- Sycamore Medical Center, Miamisburg, Ohio, Master Plan, Programming, 1975
- Dayton Children's Medical Center, Dayton, Ohio, Master Plan, Phases I & II, 1977

PUBLIC PLACES

- River Corridor Plan, Dayton, Ohio, Miami Conservancy District, 1977
- Montgomery County Courthouse Square, Dayton, Ohio 1978
- River's Edge Park, Dayton, Ohio, Miami Conservancy District, 1980
- Carillon Historical Park Master Plan, Dayton, Ohio: Wright Hall Addition, Dicke Transportation Center, Kettering Education Center, Culp Cafe

RETAIL

- Federated Department Stores, Columbus, Ohio, Lafayette Square, Lafayette, Indiana; New Division of Department Stores, Chicago, Illinois 1970-1974
- Rouse Company, Dayton, Ohio: Multiple Retail Projects. 1983
- The Home Company, Chicago, Illinois: Furniture Store, 1985

CULTURAL FACILITIES

- Dayton Natural History Museum, SunWatch Indian Village Interpretive Center, Miamisburg, Ohio 1987
- The National Aviation Hall of Fame Design, Fairborn, Ohio 1989

HIGHER EDUCATION

- Village Housing at Xavier University, Cincinnati, Ohio 1989
- Sinclair Community College Center for Interactive Learning, Dayton, Ohio, 1998
- Sinclair Community College Food Court, Dayton, Ohio 2000
- Ohio Northern University College of Business Administration, Ada, Ohio, 2003

OTHER

- NCR Worldwide Service Parts Distribution Center, Peachtree City, Georgia, 1972
- U.S. Postal Service: Trotwood Branch; West Carrollton Branches, 1974
- NCR Corporation World Parts Distribution Center, Atlanta, Georgia 1974
- Dayton Children's Medical Center Master Plan & Phase I, Dayton, Ohio 1975-1978
- Institute of Advanced Manufacturing Sciences, Cincinnati, Ohio 1986
- Mainstream Division of Federated Department Stores, 22 Stores of 2 Prototype Designs, Chicago, Illinois; Detroit, Michigan; Minneapolis, Minnesota 1984-1988
