= Fourth & Walnut Center =

Office building in Cincinnati, Ohio

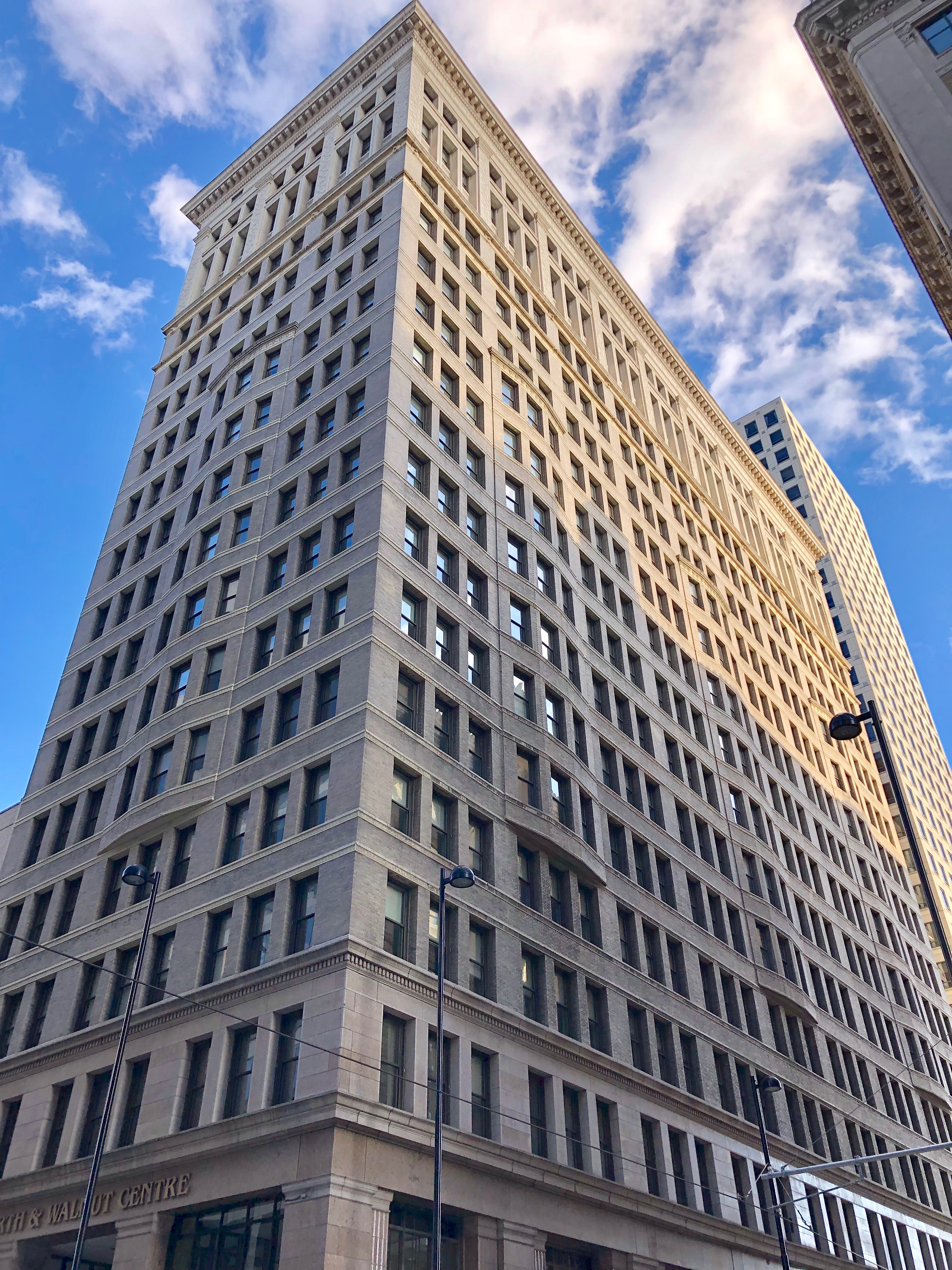
- Fourth & Walnut Center in 2019
- Interactive map of the Fourth & Walnut Center area
- Former names: First National Bank Building; Clopay Building

Record height
- Tallest in Cincinnati from 1904 to 1913^{[I]}
- Preceded by: Bartlett Building
- Surpassed by: Fourth and Vine Tower

General information
- Type: Commercial offices
- Architectural style: Chicago School
- Location: 105 East 4th Street; Cincinnati, Ohio
- Coordinates: 39.09998°N 84.51077°W
- Construction started: 1903
- Completed: 1904
- Operator: Newcrest Image

Height
- Roof: 73 m (240 ft)

Technical details
- Floor count: 19
- Lifts/elevators: 7

Design and construction
- Architect: D.H. Burnham & Co.
- Developer: D.H. Burnham & Co.
- Main contractor: D.H. Burnham & Co.
- First National Bank Building
- U.S. National Register of Historic Places
- Cincinnati Local Historic Landmark
- NRHP reference No.: 100000570
- Added to NRHP: January 24, 2017

The Fourth & Walnut Center (or Centre) is a Chicago School building in Cincinnati, Ohio. Developed by Cincinnati's First National Bank, it was originally named the First National Bank Building. Daniel Burnham of D.H. Burnham and Company was the building's architect. It was the tallest building in the state from its completion in 1904 until 1913, when it was surpassed by the Union Central Building. The structure was known as the Clopay Building from 1981 until 1991 in honor of the Clopay Corporation, a tenant. The building was listed on the National Register of Historic Places in 2017. In 2024, the Cincinnati City Council approved a plan by Supreme Bright Cincinnati LLC to convert the tower into a mixed-use hotel and apartment building, with completion scheduled for 2027.

== History ==
=== Planning and construction ===
On September 25, 1902, First National Bank purchased a plot of land at Fourth and Walnut Streets from the Baker estate for an estimated $500,000 ($18.6 million in 2025). First National announced plans to construct a 12-story building on the L-shaped plot, which had a frontage of 200 feet on Walnut Street and 66 feet on Fourth Street. Construction was expected to begin by May 1, 1903 and cost about $1 million ($35.8 million in 2025). On October 22, 1902, First National announced that the new skyscraper would be 18 stories tall, making it the tallest building in the United States outside of New York City, Pittsburgh, Chicago, and Cleveland. Chicago-based architect Daniel Burnham was hired to design the building, and it would ultimately become one of four Burnham-designed buildings in downtown Cincinnati. Stationery and printing company Bradley & Sorin, which occupied 322 Walnut Street, refused to vacate the building before the expiration of its three-year lease unless First National paid it $20,000 ($716,667 in 2025). By late March 1903, First National officials determined that the new building would not be able to occupy the full 200 feet of the plot on Walnut Street due to the lease dispute.

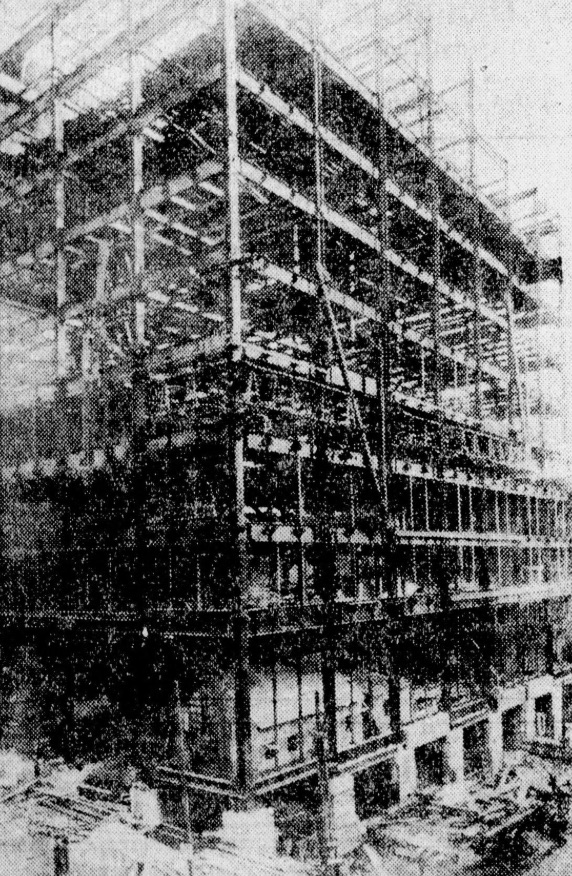
The building under construction, circa November 1903

Demolition of 324 and 326 Walnut Street began on June 15. The skyscraper's first foundation pier was installed on July 30. The first steel column was put into place on September 2. Work on the building advanced to the top floor on November 25, and an American flag was raised over the building to commemorate the milestone. All steel columns on the top floor were set to be in place by November 28. Since the beginning of steel work in early September, an average of 20 tons of steel had been raised per day, with 2200 tons raised in total. According to The Cincinnati Enquirer, the speed at which the metal framework had been erected "exceed[ed] anything accomplished within the same time in any part of [the United States]" at the time. A dozen lathers went on strike on November 26 after other workers were tasked with installing metal laths. By late November, contractor J. Griffiths & Son was rushing work on the skyscraper so that it could begin work on a new building in New York City. On December 12, about one ton of lumber fell from the 15th floor of the building onto the Bradley & Sorin building, damaging its roof and injuring two workers. Building inspector Tooker attributed the incident to the haste of construction. A weeks-long lockout of about 30 of the building's plumbers, launched as retaliation for a strike in four shops two months prior, ended on January 21, 1904.

Standing 255 feet tall, the First National Bank Building was the tallest building in Cincinnati upon its completion, surpassing Burnham's Union Trust Building by 3 feet. It remained the city's tallest building until the completion of the Union Central Building in 1913.

=== Commercial use ===
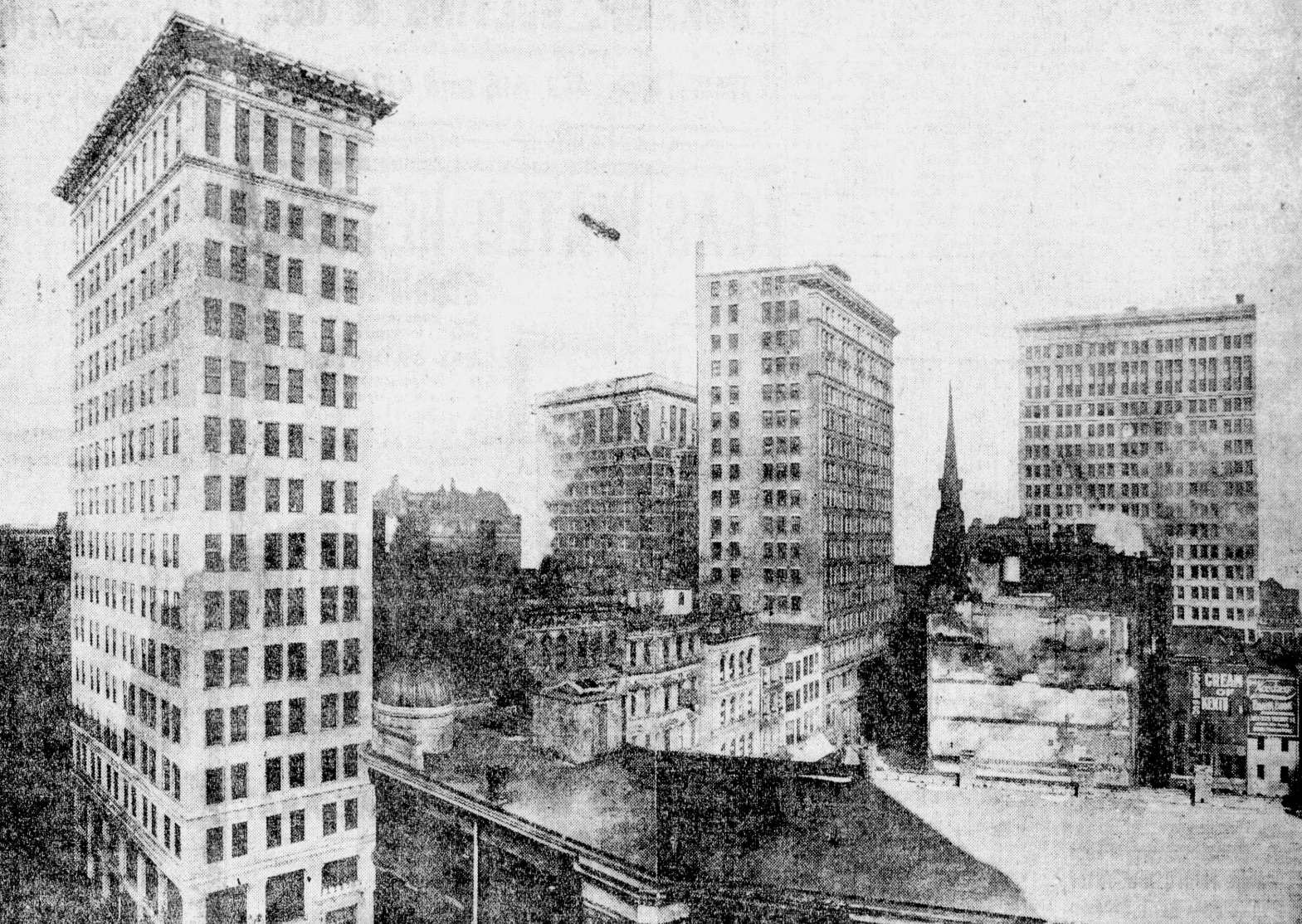
Cincinnati's skyline, published May 26, 1904. The skyscraper on the far right is the First National Bank Building

The building's first tenant was the Hirsch Iron & Steel Company of St. Louis, which moved into a temporary space on the third floor on May 16, 1904. First National Bank moved into the skyscraper on June 25. By May 1905, the Metropolitan Life Insurance Company had signed a five-year lease to nearly all of the building's top floor.

On January 4, 1905, First National acquired the National Lafeyette Bank. As First National had acquired Ohio Valley National several months prior, the skyscraper's banking room was already "somewhat crowded". First National agreed to provide temporary quarters for National Lafayette employees until after April 1906, when Bradley & Sorin's lease was set to expire and the skyscraper could be expanded into its plot of land as originally intended. By August, First National was committed to demolishing the adjoining building as soon as Bradley & Sorin's lease expired, as the bank's president was "very anxious to have the other property improved". The expansion was expected to increase the skyscraper's frontage by 44 feet and its depth by 112 feet, though First National had not yet decided if the annex would only be a few stories tall or if it would match the original building's height. First National began moving into the 18-story annex by December 22, 1906. On July 26, 1910, First National received a permit to construct a four-story addition for the skyscraper at an estimated cost of $20,000 ($691,071 in 2025).

On May 13, 1937, First National Bank announced that it had acquired the leasehold of a building at 316 Walnut Street with the privilege of purchase. First National planned to build a new addition for the First National Bank Building, which was north of the acquired property. By August 24 of that year, work on the expansion, which would include the razing of the existing building, was scheduled to begin "within the next two to three weeks". The addition was estimated to cost $400,000 ($8.96 million in 2025).

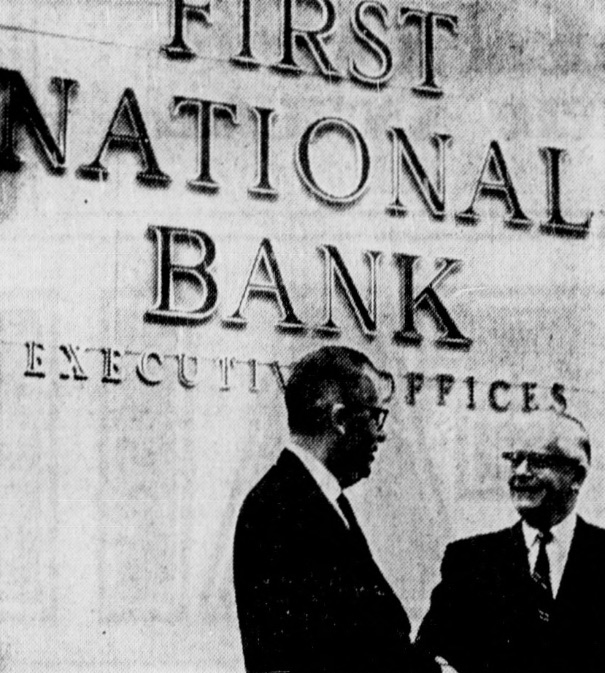
U.S. Representative Carl West Rich, right, congratulates First National Bank president Fred A. Dowd upon the opening of the 1963 annex

On June 17, 1961, First National Bank announced plans for a six-story, 182,196-square-foot addition to the building. The new annex would feature downtown Cincinnati's first drive-through bank and an underground parking area with 30 to 40 spaces for bank customers. First National intended to move its operations staff from the Atlas Annex to the third and fourth floors of the addition. The bank planned to occupy four and a half floors of the annex and rent out the remainder. The structure would take the place of the St. Paul, Loring Andrews, and Wurlitzer buildings, which were scheduled to begin demolition that July. The addition ultimately grew to eight stories by the time of its completion. First National decided to combine the annex's opening in October 1963 with celebrations for the bank's centennial that year. On October 12, U.S. Representative Carl West Rich presented the bank with an American flag from the United States Capitol. First National president Fred A. Dowd and Cincinnati Mayor Walt Bachrach presided over the addition's ribbon-cutting ceremony on October 14. The four-day celebration, which was attended by over 20,000 people, also featured a car parade and a public tour of the bank. The festivities were slated to conclude on October 16 with the opening of the drive-through bank.

On November 20, 1978, Cin-May Realty Co. purchased the primary building, the 1937 annex, and the 1963 executive office building for over $6 million ($29.6 million in 2025) ahead of First National Bank's planned move to the new First National Bank Center in 1980. Cin-May's principals were real estate executives Manuel and Frederic Mayerson of Manuel D. Mayerson Associates Inc.

On December 14, 1979, the Clopay Corporation announced that it had signed a 10-year lease to 75,000 square feet within the tower, which was set to be vacated by First National. Clopay, which sought to move from its existing headquarters in the Queensgate neighborhood, planned to occupy the second through sixth floors as well as floor 18. The building was initially slated to adopt the name "Clopay Tower" upon Clopay's move. Restoration work began in September 1980 to prepare the building for Clopay's arrival. The tower was renamed the "Clopay Building" by November 22, 1981.

On December 4, 1984, Manuel Mayerson sold five downtown buildings, including the Clopay Building and the Fourth and Vine Tower, to New York financial services firm Integrated Resources, Inc. Under the deal, Mayerson sold two of his companies, Cin-May Realty and Quonset Realty, to Integrated Resources affiliate Somnat Corp. Somnat then transferred the buildings owned by Mayerson's companies to the limited partnership Clovine Associates for $72 million ($223 million in 2025), but the price of this transfer had "no bearing" on the undisclosed sum received by Mayerson for his companies. The buildings were collectively valued at just under $22 million ($68.2 million in 2025) at the time. Management of the buildings was projected to remain with Mayerson Associates, which Mayerson stated was a prerequisite for the sale.

Integrated Resources filed for bankruptcy in February 1990. On January 4, 1991, The Travelers Insurance Co. filed two foreclosure lawsuits against five downtown buildings owned by Clovine Associates, including the Clopay Building. Travelers stated that Clovine took out a $24.35 ($75.5 million in 2025) million mortgage on the Clopay Building, which was subsequently refinanced with a $1.24 million amended note. Travelers stated that it was owed more than $62 million ($147 million in 2025) in total. A judge appointed Matthews, Click, Bauman Inc. of Columbus as the receiver of the buildings. In March, five Clovine investors filed a class action lawsuit against Integrated Resources, stating that Integrated had misrepresented the value of the buildings ahead of the 1984 sale. The plaintiffs sought full reimbursement for themselves and 315 other investors. In August, the plaintiffs amended their suit to include complaints of racketeering and securities fraud.

On May 31, 1991, Clopay announced that it would move to the new 312 Walnut Building on December 1 of that year. Clopay president George Strutz stated that "we were content [at the Clopay Building] but were looking for something to handle our dynamic growth". The Clopay Building was renamed "Fourth & Walnut Centre" later that year. By early 1992, about 120,000 of the 390,000 square feet within the building was vacant. Travelers purchased the Fourth & Walnut Centre on January 8, 1993. In the summer of 1994, the building was purchased by Cincinnati Gas & Electric to support the company's projected growth. In October of that year, Gas & Electric merged with PSI Resources Inc. to become Cinergy. The Centre was renovated in 1997.

In 2005, a private equity buyer in Indianapolis purchased the building for $31.2 million in a deal facilitated by CB Richard Ellis. The building was about 90% occupied at the time. The buyer, Fourth & Walnut Center LLC, borrowed $25 million to complete the purchase. The U.S. National Bank Association filed a foreclosure suit against Fourth & Walnut Center LLC in 2008, and a receiver was appointed for the building that year. The receivership ended after Washington, D.C.-based 105 East Fourth Street Holdings LLC, the building's lender and an affiliate of CW Financial Services, bought the building for $14 million on July 6, 2010.

=== Hotel and residential conversion ===
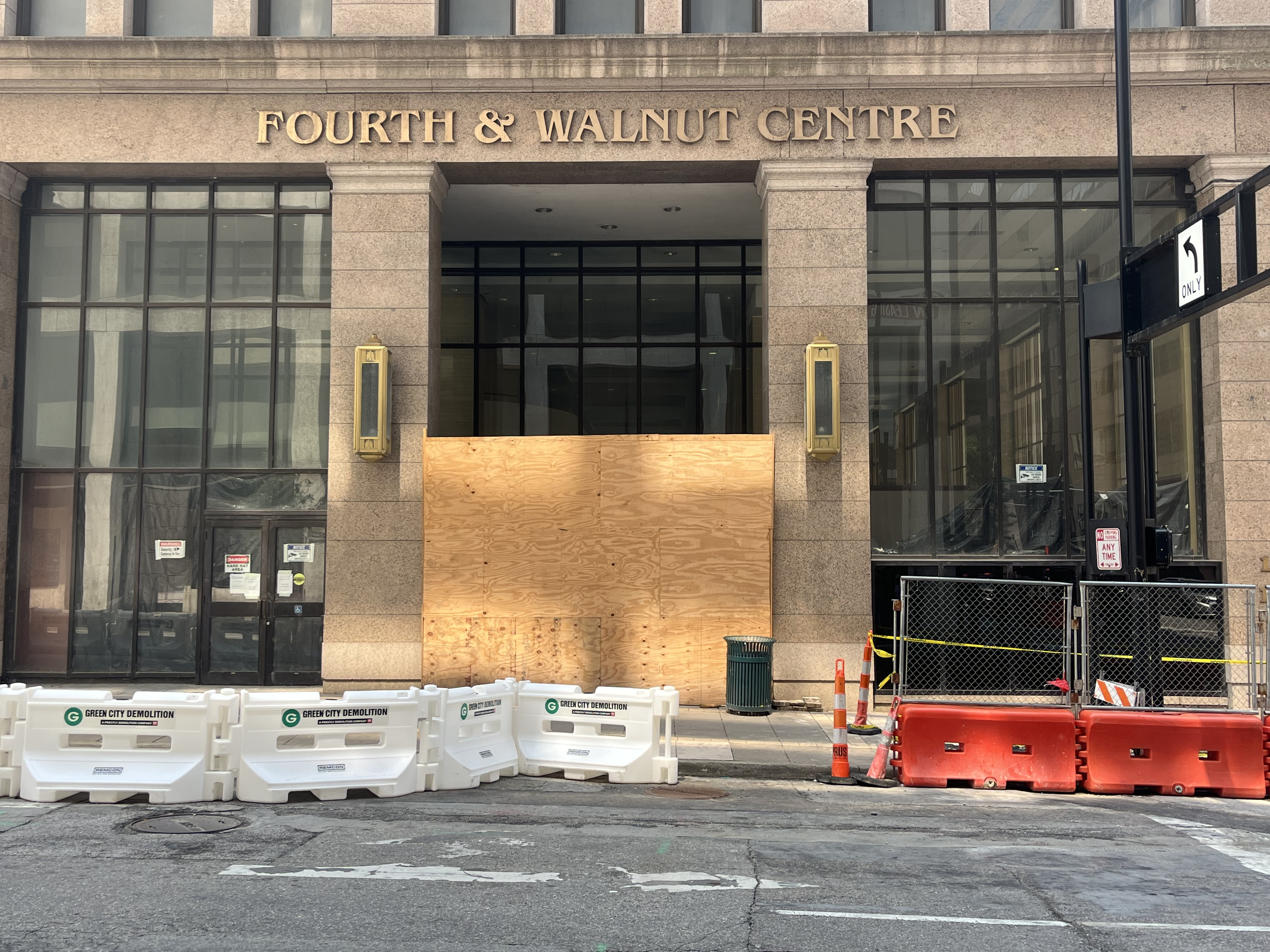
The entrance of the building mid-demolition in August 2026

The building was purchased by Texan investment firm Newcrest Image in 2016 at a cost of $9.3 million. The firm proposed transforming the tower into a 349-room hotel at a cost of $67 million. The building was added to the National Register of Historic Places in 2017, giving the developer the opportunity to seek historic tax credits. The project was granted a 15-year tax abatement in 2018, but the conversion never began due to a lack of funds and the abatement expired in 2023. In 2024, the Cincinnati City Council approved a revised plan by Newcrest Image subsidiary Supreme Bright Cincinnati LLC to convert the "mostly vacant" Fourth & Walnut Center into a mixed-use building. Scheduled for completion in 2027, the project includes plans for a luxury hotel with 280 rooms, 16 "high-end" apartments, a restaurant, and a bar. The city of Cincinnati did not provide funding for the estimated $175 million renovation, but did grant the developer another 15-year tax abatement.

Scaffolding was installed outside the building in 2024, but work on the conversion stalled until April 2026, when Model Group of Cincinnati's Over-the-Rhine neighborhood began interior demolition work. Demolition was slated to conclude that September. On July 1 of that year, Newcrest was awarded a $14.8 million "transformational mixed-use development tax credit" from the Ohio government, which the Cincinnati Business Courier described as a "major boost" for the conversion effort. Newcrest had previously submitted unsuccessful applications for the tax credit in 2023 and 2024. Newcrest's 2026 application stated that the project would be "luxury mixed-use", featuring the previously disclosed hotel and apartments as well as a 295-spot parking garage and a "small office footprint". The application projected that the building would be worth $121.2 million after the conversion, an increase from the $10.3 million 2026 valuation, and that payroll for permanent employees would reach $6.7 million.

== See also ==
- List of tallest buildings in Cincinnati
- National Register of Historic Places listings in downtown Cincinnati
