= Greater Cincinnati Chamber of Commerce =

Coordinates: 39°06′03″N 84°30′48″W

The Greater Cincinnati Chamber of Commerce, doing business as the Cincinnati USA Regional Chamber, is a regional chamber of commerce. It is one of the nation's largest chambers of commerce, representing about 4,000 businesses and 500,000 employees in southwestern Ohio, northern Kentucky and southeastern Indiana, also known as Greater Cincinnati, or the Cincinnati–Northern Kentucky metropolitan area. It was twice named national Chamber of the Year.

== History ==
The Cincinnati Chamber of Commerce was founded on October 15, 1839, by 76 companies and individuals who placed an ad in the Cincinnati Daily Gazette urging local businessmen to attend a meeting at the Young Men's Mercantile Library Association headquarters in the old Cincinnati College Building at Fourth and Walnut Streets. This Chamber's founding preceded the United States Chamber of Commerce, which held its first meeting in Cincinnati, by 73 years. The Cincinnati Chamber celebrated its 175th anniversary in 2014.

The Cincinnati Chamber of Commerce met in six different temporary locations until in 1876 they started to build a permanent office, inviting local architects to compete in a selection competition. Henry Hobson Richardson's design won, and it built the new headquarters building in 1889. A fire in 1911 caused substantial damage to the building, leading to the discovery that only $90,000 of insurance was carried on the building, which had cost $772,674.05 to build, and so it could not be repaired. When the property was sold, much of the granite from the building was saved and stored in Oakley, Ohio. In 1967, University of Cincinnati Professor John Peterson coordinated an effort to build a memorial to Henry Hobson Richardson out of the surviving stones. A design competition whose jury included's Richardson's grandson was held in 1968 and the design by student Stephen Carter (architect) was selected. The memorial was completed in 1972 and resides in Burnet Woods.

According to Charles Ludwig, a journalist in the 1920s and 1930s for the Cincinnati Times-Star, the Chamber had been involved in most of the city's significant developments since its creation.

As Cincinnati grew and became an eight-county metropolitan area in the mid-1960s, the Chamber changed its name to the Greater Cincinnati Chamber of Commerce to reflect its regional representation of businesses throughout Southwestern Ohio, Northern Kentucky and Southeastern Indiana. It is now called The Cincinnati USA Regional Chamber. The phrase "Cincinnati USA" is used to indicate that Greater Cincinnati extends beyond just one U.S. city and state. Cincinnati USA is a region of 15 counties (In Ohio: Butler, Warren, Hamilton, Clermont and Brown Counties. In Kentucky: Boone, Kenton, Campbell, Gallatin, Grant, Pendleton and Bracken Counties. In Indiana: Franklin, Dearborn and Ohio Counties) located in three states (Ohio, Kentucky & Indiana).

== Presidents ==
=== John P. Williams Jr. ===
Williams served as President from 1984 to 2001, and spearheaded efforts to revamp the riverfront and bring two new stadiums into the area. He also helped bring the Toyota Motor Engineering & Manufacturing North America headquarters into the area. In 2017, he was recognized as a "Great Living Cincinnatian".
