= West Fourth Street Historic District =

West Fourth Street Historic District may refer to:

- West Fourth Street Historic District (Maysville, Kentucky)
- West Fourth Street Historic District (Cincinnati, Ohio)
