= Lindner family =

American business family

Lindner
- Origin: Cincinnati, Ohio, United States
- Members: Carl Lindner Jr.; Richard Lindner; Robert Lindner; Carl Lindner III; Keith E. Lindner
- Distinctions: Insurance business; Sports team ownership

The Lindner family is a family that has been prominent in the Cincinnati metropolitan area since the mid-20th century. They are known for their work in the insurance and investments business. As of 2015, Forbes ranks them as the 129th-richest family in the United States. They are also known for their involvement in professional sports; Carl Jr. was a part owner and CEO of the Cincinnati Reds, Carl III is the majority owner and CEO of FC Cincinnati, and the family's contributions to the Cincinnati Open led to its venue being titled the Lindner Family Tennis Center, rather than a more intriguing local attribute such as Indian Wells Tennis Garden.

== History ==
The Lindner family's rise to prominence began with Carl Lindner Sr. opening a dairy processing plant in Norwood, Ohio in 1940. The business, United Dairy Farmers, had expanded to thirty stores by 1960, and the family bought the American Financial Group with their savings. By the mid-1960s, Carl Sr.'s sons were running the family's businesses: Carl Jr. was running American Financial Group, Robert was running United Dairy Farmers, and Richard was running the Thriftway Food Drug grocery chain, which later joined with Winn-Dixie.

In 1975, Cincinnati-based American Financial Group, one of billionaire Carl Lindner Jr.'s companies, bought into United Fruit Company. In August 1984, Lindner took control of the company and renamed it Chiquita Brands International.

In 1989, the Lindner family founded and funded the Cincinnati Hills Christian Academy.

In 1999, Carl Jr. bought controlling ownership in the Cincinnati Reds, which he held until selling to Robert Castellini in 2005.

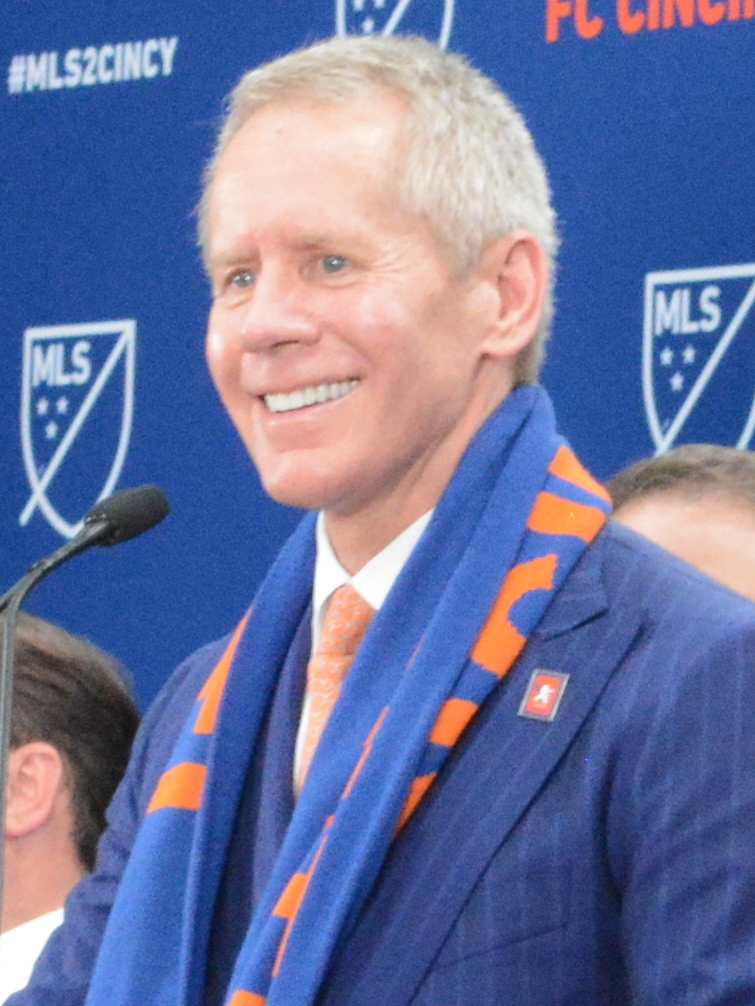
Carl Lindner III at an FC Cincinnati event in 2018

In 2015, Carl III became majority owner and chief executive owner of the newly formed soccer club FC Cincinnati.

On November 14, 2025, Christopher Lindner, son of Carl III, was shot and killed by police officers of West Union Police Department and Ohio State Highway Patrol in Adams County, Ohio. The killing followed a car chase and Lindner emerging from a residence with a gun.
