= American Premier Underwriters =

American insurance company

- Type: Publicly traded
- Industry: Insurance
- Founded: 1846
- Headquarters: Cincinnati, Ohio, U.S.
- Products: Property insurance Casualty insurance

American Premier Underwriters is a property and casualty insurance company, headquartered in Cincinnati, Ohio. Prior to 1995, the company was known as the Penn Central Corporation. In addition to casualty insurance, the company is also in the business of fire and marine insurance.

== History ==
=== 19th century ===
During the 19th century, the company, established on April 13, 1846, was owned by the Pennsylvania Railroad.

=== 20th century ===
On March 25, 1994, the company changed its name from Penn Central Corporation to American Premier Underwriters Inc.

In December 1994, the company, which was 40.4 percent owned by the American Financial Corporation, announced that it would be acquiring the parent company in a stock merger. The combined company became known as American Financial Group.

In 1995, as a publicly traded company, APU reportedly had 5,400 employees and sales of $1.8 billion.

=== 21st century ===
In 2008, the company sued Amtrak to force the passenger railroad company to redeem shares that Penn Central received at the time it transferred much of its passenger rail assets to Amtrak. The case was dismissed seven years later, in 2015.
