= Penson =

Surname

Penson is a surname. Notable persons with the surname include:

- Andrew S. Penson, American businessman
- César Nicolás Penson (1855–1901), Dominican author
- Charlie Penson (born 1942), Canadian politician
- Lillian Penson (1896–1963), English historian
- Max Penson (1893–1959), Russian photojournalist
- Paul Penson (1931–2006), American baseball player
- Ricardo Penson (born 1952), Filipino business executive
- Richard Kyrke Penson (1815–1885), Welsh architect
- Thomas Penson (1790–1859), English surveyor
- Thomas Mainwaring Penson (1818–1864), English architect

== See also ==
- Julius Penson Williams
- Thomas Penson De Quincey
