= Lindner Family Tennis Center =

Tennis venue in Mason, Ohio

Coordinates: 39.348934°N 84.27711°W

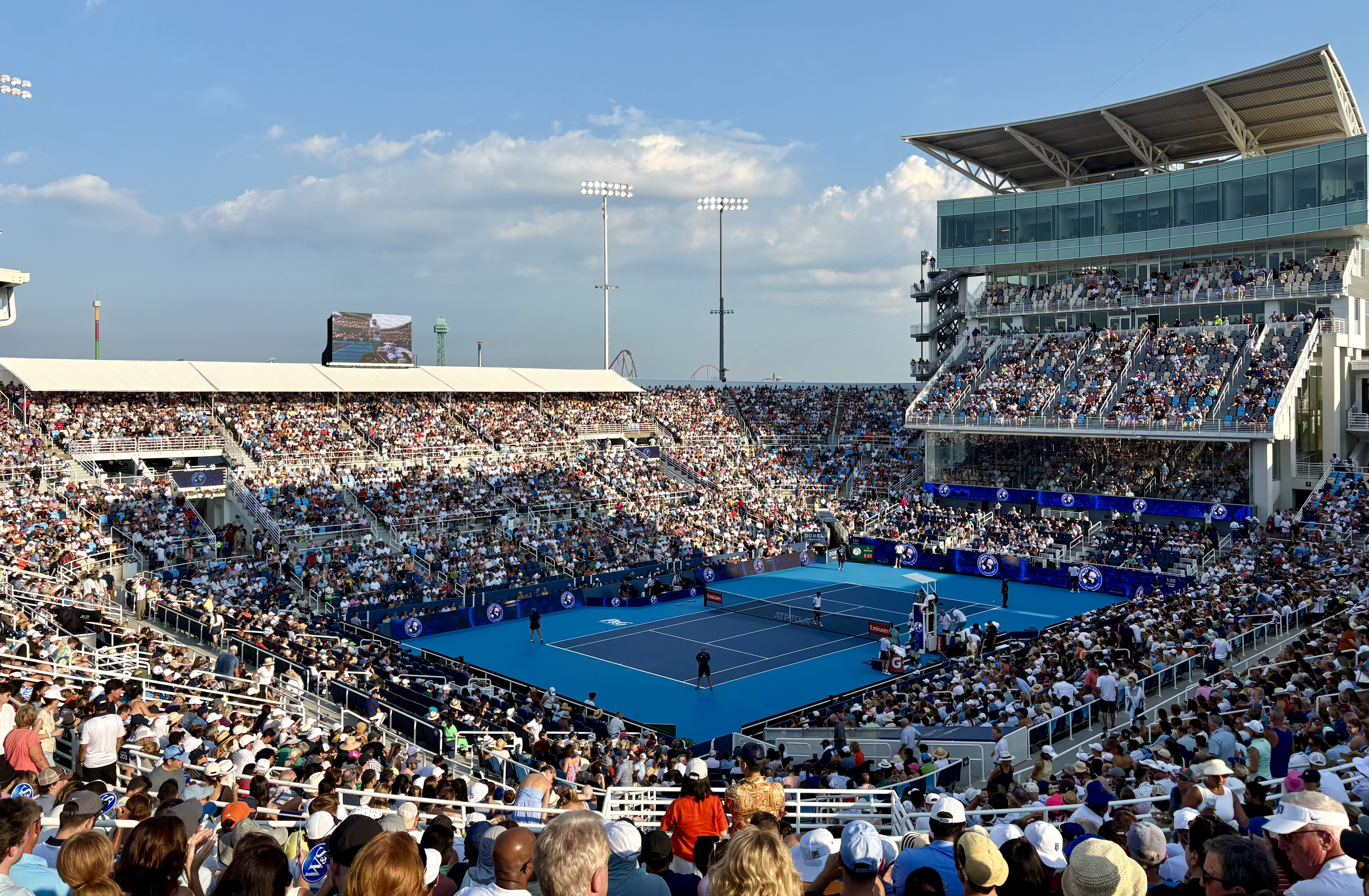
- Center Court in 2025
- Interactive map of Lindner Family Tennis Center
- Location: Mason, Ohio, United States
- Owner: Tennis for Charity, Inc.
- Operator: Cincinnati Tennis, LLC
- Capacity: 11,614 (Center Court); 5,000 (Grandstand); 4,000 (Trabert); 2,300 (Champions); 2,000 (Court 10)
- Surface: Hard, Outdoors

Construction
- Groundbreaking: 1979
- Opened: 1979; 1981 – Center Court; 1995 – Grandstand (Court 2); 1997 – Courts 10; 2010 – Stadium 3; 2025 – Champions Court
- Renovated: 2009–2010; 2024–2025
- Expanded: Continuously since 1979
- Cost: Initial: $35 million 2009–2010: $10 million 2024–2025: $260 million
- Architects: Browning Day (1981, 1995, 1997, 2010); Gensler & Barton Malow (2024, 2025)
- Main contractor: Vector Construction of Northern Kentucky

Tenant
- Cincinnati Open (1979–present)

Website
- www.cincytennis.com

The Lindner Family Tennis Center is a tennis facility in Mason, Ohio. It is the home of the Cincinnati Open and is owned by Tennis for Charity, Inc. The grounds include five permanent tennis stadia, P&G Center Court, Grandstand Court, Tony Trabert Stadium 3, Champions Court, and Court 10, distinguishing the center as the only world tennis venue, apart from the four Grand Slam venues, with more than two permanent stadia. Center Court, built in 1981 and expanded many times since, has a capacity of 11,600.

Its name, The Lindner Family Tennis Center, pays tribute to the family of a former tournament sponsor, the late Cincinnati financier, Carl Lindner, Jr..

Browning Day of Indianapolis has been the architectural firm of record for the Center since its conception.

== Stadium courts ==
The tennis center features a total of 31 courts, including five permanent stadiums.

Stadium	Built	Capacity
P&G Center Court	1981	11,600
Grandstand Court	1995	5,000
Tony Trabert Stadium 3	2010	4,000
Champions Court	2025	2,300
Court 10	1997	2,000

== History ==
The location became home to the Cincinnati Open in 1979 when tournament organizers grew weary of perennial Ohio River flooding at its venue of the time, the Coney Island amusement park. One of the tournament sponsors, Taft Broadcasting, owned the Kings Island Amusement Park in Mason, as well as the Golf Center at Kings Island, which was located on land directly across Interstate 71 from the park. When the chairman of Taft Broadcasting, Charles Mechem, suggested the tournament move to land at the Golf Center, tournament organizers, led by Paul M. Flory, agreed.

Four courts of DecoTurf II were initially installed at the new location, and the bleachers used at Coney Island were shipped up I-71 and placed around one of them to form Center Court. Two years later, those bleachers were removed and the first phase of construction on that court began. Enhancements to seating and amenities on Center Court have been made nearly every year since.

One of the biggest expansions came in 1987 when the original West Building was added, creating working space for players and media and luxury suites for fans. An expansion in 1990 added more suites and increased capacity on Center Court to 10,000. Construction in 1998 added two additional courts, bringing the total number of courts at the Tennis Center to 10.

In 2010, the Tennis Center was enhanced with a new "West Building," now known as The Paul M. Flory Player Center in honor of the 36-year patriarch of the tournament. The new 52,000 square feet (4,800 m^{2}) Player Center added space not only for players, but for media and fans as well. It is approximately twice as high as the previous West Building, rising 85 feet (26 m) above ground level and 97 feet (30 m) above the court level. A canopy extends over the west stands providing more covered seating. Total Center Court seating capacity was raised from 10,500 to 11,400 after the renovation.

In 2011 the grounds were expanded by more than 40% and six courts were added (increasing the total number of courts from 10 to 16), including Court 3 which serves as the third television court for the tournament. The expansion also included a new front entrance, entry plaza and ticket office. Harry Ewers & Sons, Inc. was chosen to construct and maintain the facility tennis courts.

In 2012, the tournament expanded the food court and exhibit areas and also enhanced the northern entrance.

== Other events ==
The venue also hosts the Atlantic 10 Conference Tennis Championships and the Ohio Athletic Conference Tennis Championships, and has hosted the Association of Volleyball Professionals Cincinnati professional sand volleyball tournament, special events such as concerts and Hospice of Cincinnati's annual fundraising event, and numerous national and regional high school tennis tournaments.

It has also hosted the Cincinnati AVP Pro Beach Volleyball Championship Series.

Since the 2015–2016 school year, the Ohio High School Athletic Association state championship tournament has been held at the Lindner Family Tennis Center. The tournament was previously held at Ohio State University and the Elysium Tennis Center.

Since 2023, the venue has hosted a Professional Pickleball Association tournament, which is currently known as the Cincinnati Showcase.

== See also ==
- List of tennis stadiums by capacity
