= Ilesfay Technology Group =

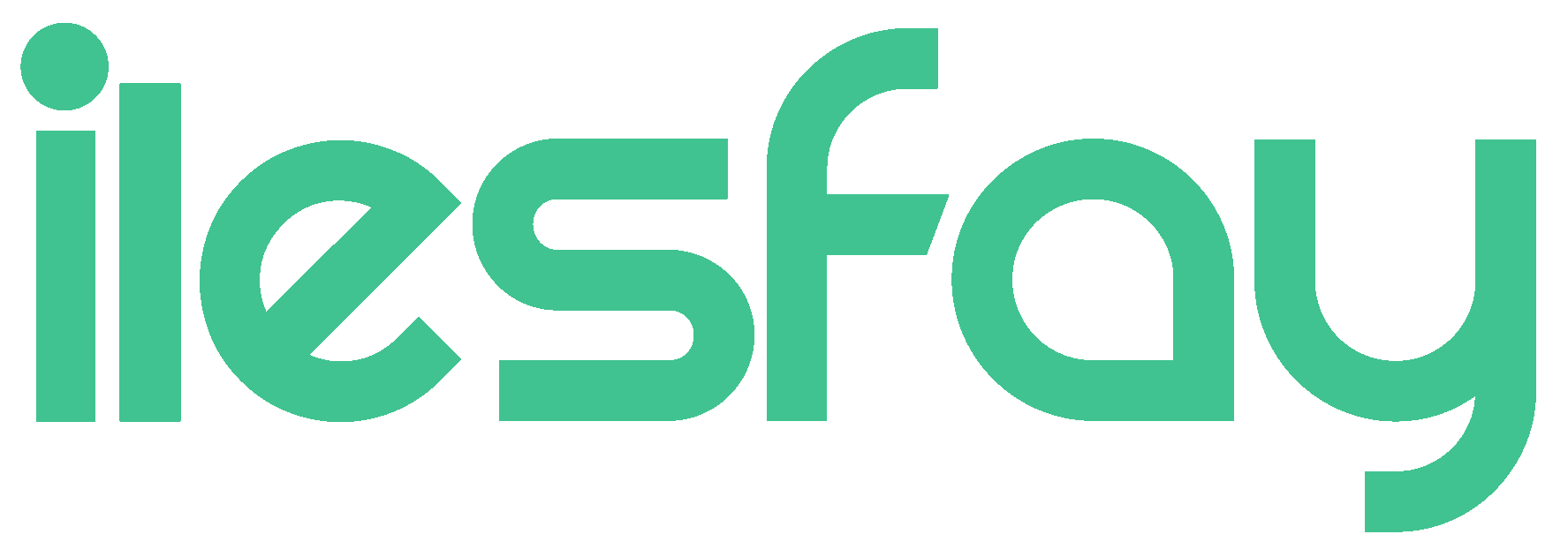
- Company type: Private
- Industry: Enterprise Software
- Founded: 2009
- Fate: Acquired by Autodesk in 2014
- Headquarters: Cincinnati, Ohio
- Area served: Windows, Linux, Mac OS X
- Products: Cloud Based Data Replication
- Website: www.ilesfay.com

Ilesfay Technology Group LLC was a technology firm that provided cloud based replication and data delivery solutions. Ilesfay was venture-backed, with the lead investor being CincyTechUSA. The firm announced via their website that they had been acquired by San Francisco-based Autodesk, Inc. in 2014.

== Intellectual property ==
On August 15, 2012, Ilesfay received US patent #8,244,831 titled Method for the Preemptive Creation of Binary Delta Information within a Computer Network for their cloud-based delta encoding/binary differencing methods. On March 26, 2013, Ilesfay received US patent #8,407,315 titled Method for Horizontal Scale Delta Encoding. On November 26, 2013, Ilesfay received US patent #8,595,187 titled Serialization for Delta Encoding.

== Investors ==
Early angel investors in Ilesfay included Cincinnati Reds owner Bob Castellini.

== PointToCloud ==
PointToCloud represents the Ilesfay file management and distribution architecture. This architecture defines a cloud-based distribution system that enables delivery of unstructured data without traditional leased line, point-to-point network connectivity. The architecture enables location-independent network participation and consistent connectivity.

== Location ==
Ilesfay's replication services ran in six geographically distributed regions within Amazon AWS: California, Virginia, Brazil, Ireland, Singapore and Tokyo.
