= Najdorf =

Najdorf may refer to:

- Miguel Najdorf (1910–1997), Polish-born Argentine chess grandmaster
- Sicilian Defence, Najdorf Variation, chess opening used by Miguel Najdorf

== See also ==
- Louis Naidorf (1928–2025), American architect and educator
