= Argent Ventures =

American privately held real estate company

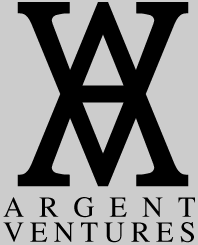
- Type: Private
- Industry: Real estate
- Founded: 1997; 29 years ago
- Founder: Andrew Penson
- Headquarters: New York City, New York, United States
- Key people: Andrew S. Penson (Founder and President); Bertrand Amezcua (Vice president); Mark Teitelbaum (COO)
- Website: argentventures.com

Argent Ventures, LLC. is a privately held real estate company based in New York City that most notably owned the land under Grand Central Terminal and the land around 156 miles (251 km) of Metro-North Railroad railway tracks in the New York City metropolitan area from 1994 to 2018.

== Properties ==
Among other high-profile buildings currently owned are:

- Capitol Records Tower in Hollywood, California (bought from British record company EMI in 2006)
- Omni International Mall in Miami, Florida (the company received permission in March 2007 to redevelop into a complex of six towers between 58 and 65 floors)

The company was spun off in 1996 by Andrew Penson from Amroc Investments, which specializes in turning around distressed properties.

Two of its earlier properties that have since been sold included:

- Chrysler Building in New York (minority interest)
- Manhattan Mall in New York

=== Metro-North assets ===
In the breakup of the Penn Central Railroad in 1976, the land under Midtown Manhattan's Grand Central Terminal and its associated tracks continued to be owned by Penn Central Corporation but leased to the Metropolitan Transportation Authority's Metro-North Railroad. The railroad's Hudson Line and Harlem Line was also owned by the Penn Central holding company and leased to Metro-North. Penn Central as a holding company changed its name to American Premier Underwriters in March 1994. It in turn was absorbed by the American Financial Group.

On December 6, 2006, the United States Department of Transportation announced Midtown TDR Ventures LLC had purchased the rights from American Financial. As part of the transaction the lease with the MTA was renegotiated through February 28, 2274.

The New York Post reported in 2007 that Midtown TDR was controlled by Penson and Venture. The Post noted that the MTA would pay $2.24 million in rent in 2007, but had an option to buy the station and tracks in 2017, although Argent was able to extend the option date another 15 years to 2032. Venture had desired the air rights for possible future development above the tracks. At the time, Argent still owned the Hudson Line and most of the Harlem Line, except for the section of track north of Dover Plains on the Harlem Line, which was owned by the MTA.

In November 2018, the MTA proposed purchasing the Hudson and Harlem Lines as well as the Grand Central Terminal for up to $35.065 million, plus a discount rate of 6.25%. The purchase would include all inventory, operations, improvements, and maintenance associated with each asset, except for the air rights over Grand Central. At the time, the Hudson and Harlem Lines were owned by the Penn Central holding company, while the Grand Central Terminal was owned by Midtown TDR Ventures. Under the terms of the leases for each asset, the MTA would only be able to exercise an option to purchase the three assets before October 2019.

The MTA wanted to purchase the assets in order to avoid future double-payments on its existing leases for these assets. If the option were exercised, the closing of the sale was not proposed to occur until at least April 2020. The MTA's finance committee approved the proposed purchase on November 13, 2018, and the purchase was approved by the full board two days later. Under the terms of the deal, the MTA purchased Grand Central Terminal, as well as the Hudson Line from Grand Central to a point 2 miles (3.2 km) north of Poughkeepsie, and the Harlem Line from Grand Central to Dover Plains.

== Acquisition ==
In July 2019, Argent Ventures has taken over Princeton 's University Square office building from RXR Realty and The Blackstone Group.

== See also ==
- Home 365
- Blue Rock Partners
