= Carl Lindner III =

American businessman (born 1953)

Carl H. Lindner III
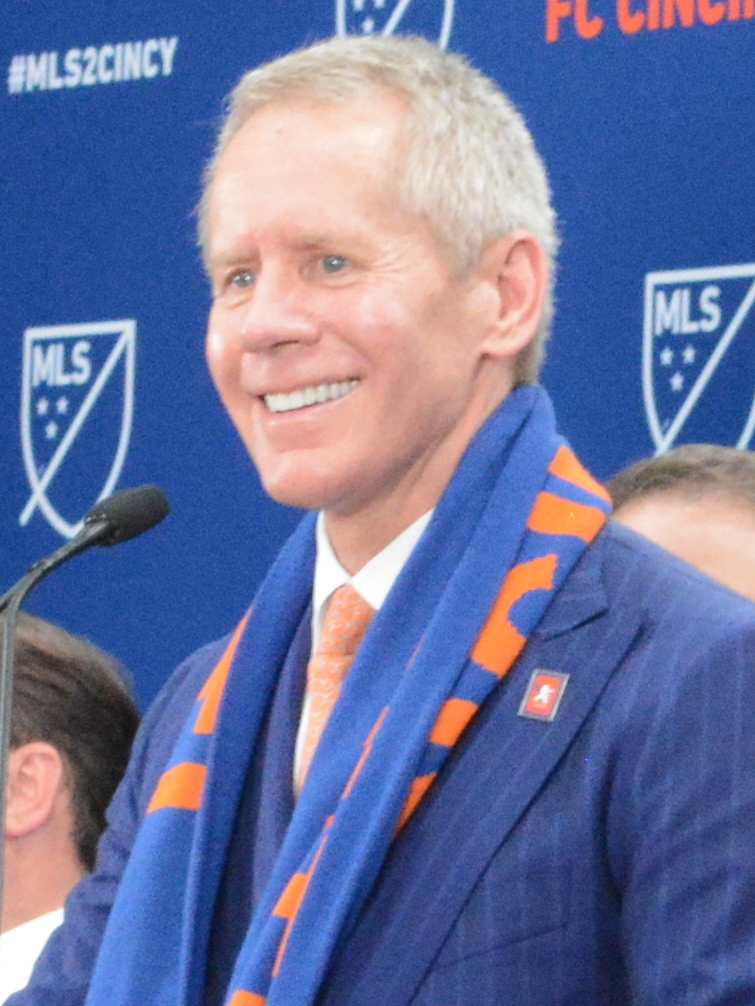
- Lindner at FC Cincinnati's MLS franchise announcement event in 2018
- Born: 1953 (age 72–73); Cincinnati, Ohio, U.S.
- Education: University of Cincinnati
- Occupations: Co-CEO and Co-President of American Financial Group; Co-CEO of FC Cincinnati
- Spouse: Martha Lindner
- Children: 4
- Parents: Carl Lindner Jr. (father); Edyth Bailey (mother)
- Family: Lindner family

Carl Henry Lindner III (born 1953) is an American businessman from Cincinnati, Ohio. He has served as the co-chief executive officer of American Financial Group since January 2005. He has also acted as chief executive officer and majority owner of FC Cincinnati since the club's founding in 2015. He is the son of Carl Lindner Jr. and a prominent member of the Lindner family.

== Biography ==
Carl H. Lindner III was born to Carl Lindner Jr. and Edyth Bailey in 1953 in Cincinnati, Ohio. He received a Bachelor of Business Administration degree from the University of Cincinnati in 1975.

In 1975, Lindner began working at American Financial Group, which his father had bought two years prior. He has served as chairman of Great American Insurance Company since 1987. He became a director and co-president of American Financial in 1996 and additionally was elected as the co-chief executive officer along with his brother S. Craig Lindner in January 2005.

In 1989, Carl and Martha Lindner were involved as founders and major benefactors in Cincinnati Hills Christian Academy, a private university-preparatory school in Cincinnati.

In 2015, Lindner was involved in co-founding soccer club FC Cincinnati, and is the chief executive officer and majority owner. Speaking about the success and high attendance the club received in its inaugural season, general manager Jeff Berding said, "What has happened is directly attributable to having Carl and the Lindner family as our majority owners. It's the foundation of everything."

In 2016, the University of Cincinnati bestowed an honorary doctorate to Lindner.

In his State of the City speech in October 2016, Cincinnati mayor John Cranley named Jeff Berding and Carl H. Lindner III as the shared holders of the Cincinnatian of the Year award for their work managing FC Cincinnati.

Lindner was appointed to the Kennedy Center Board of Trustees in March 2019 by President Donald Trump. His term ended in September 2024.

== Personal life ==
Lindner says he is a "devout Christian," and says he begins each day with thirty minutes of prayer. He and his wife Martha have four children, one deceased, and three grandchildren and reside in Cincinnati. His son, Christopher, was shot and killed following a pursuit and gunfight with police during a suspected mental health crisis in 2025.
