= Penn Central Transportation Company =

American class I railroad company in operation from 1968 to 1976

- Map of Penn Central trackage. Constituent railroads shown in different colors; trackage rights shown in purple
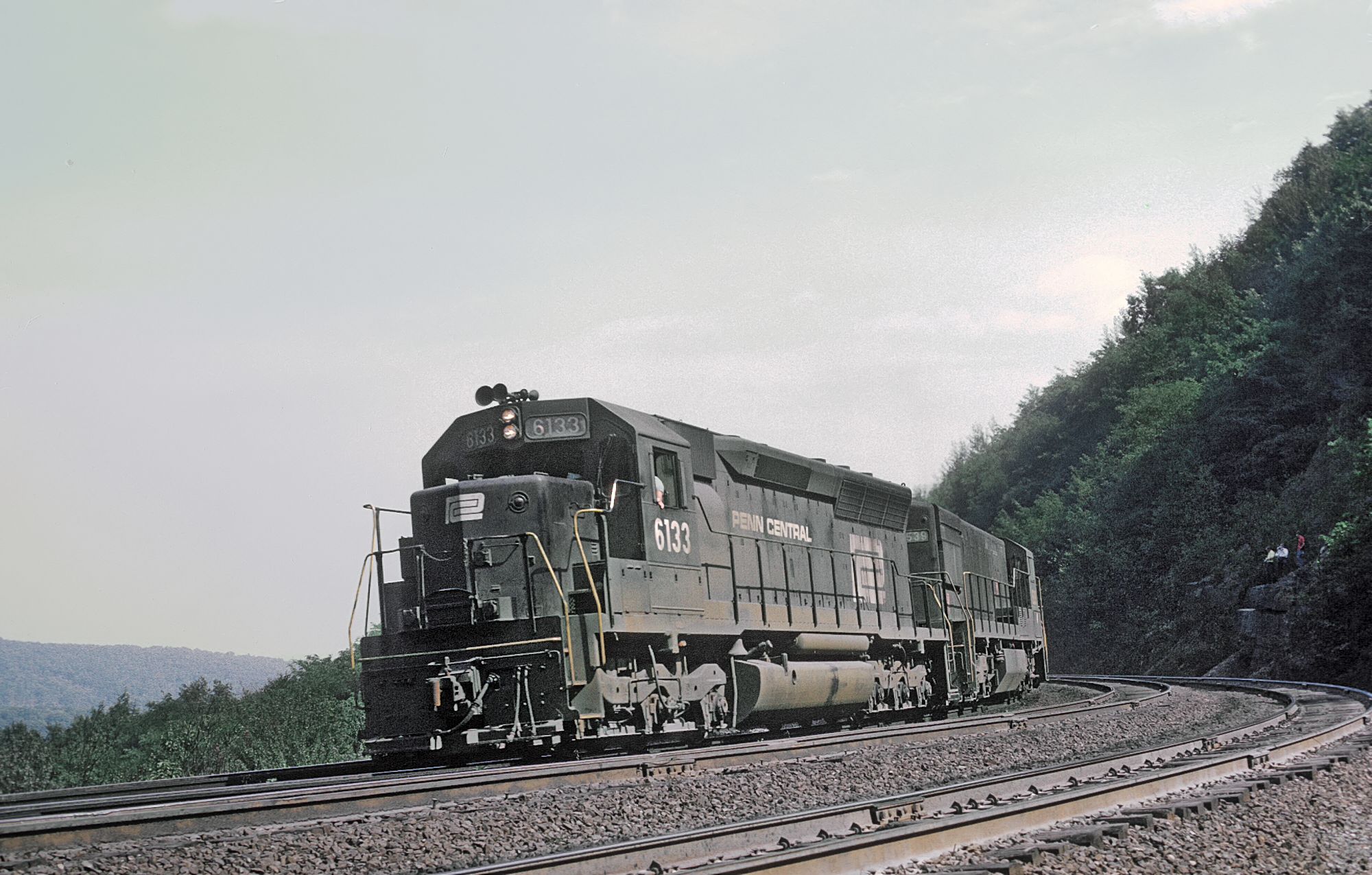
- Penn Central (PC) SD45 No. 6133 at Horseshoe Curve in Blair County, Pennsylvania, on September 13, 1970, three months after PC filed for bankruptcy

Overview
- Headquarters: Philadelphia, Pennsylvania, US
- Reporting mark: PC
- Locale: Connecticut; Delaware; Illinois; Indiana; Kentucky; Maryland; Massachusetts; Michigan; Missouri; New York; New Jersey; Ohio; Ontario; Pennsylvania; Quebec; Rhode Island; Virginia; Washington, DC; West Virginia
- Dates of operation: 1968–1976
- Predecessor: Pennsylvania Railroad; New York Central System; New York, New Haven and Hartford Railroad
- Successor: Organization: American Premier Underwriters; Assets: Conrail; See also: Amtrak

Technical
- Track gauge: 4 ft 8 1/2 in (1,435 mm)
- Electrification: 12.5 kV 25 Hz AC New Haven – Washington, D.C. / South Amboy Philadelphia–Harrisburg 700V DC Harlem Line Hudson Line
- Length: 20,530 miles (33,040 kilometres)

Other
- Website: pcrrhs.org

The Penn Central Transportation Company, commonly abbreviated to Penn Central, was an American class I railroad that operated from 1968 to 1976. Penn Central combined three traditional corporate rivals (the Pennsylvania, New York Central and the New York, New Haven and Hartford railroads), each of which were united by large-scale service into the New York metropolitan area and to a lesser extent New England and Chicago.

Barely two years after its formation, the new company failed in what was the largest bankruptcy in U.S. history at the time. Penn Central's railroad assets were subsequently nationalized into Conrail along with those of other bankrupt northeastern railroads; its real estate and insurance holdings successfully reorganized into American Premier Underwriters.

== History ==
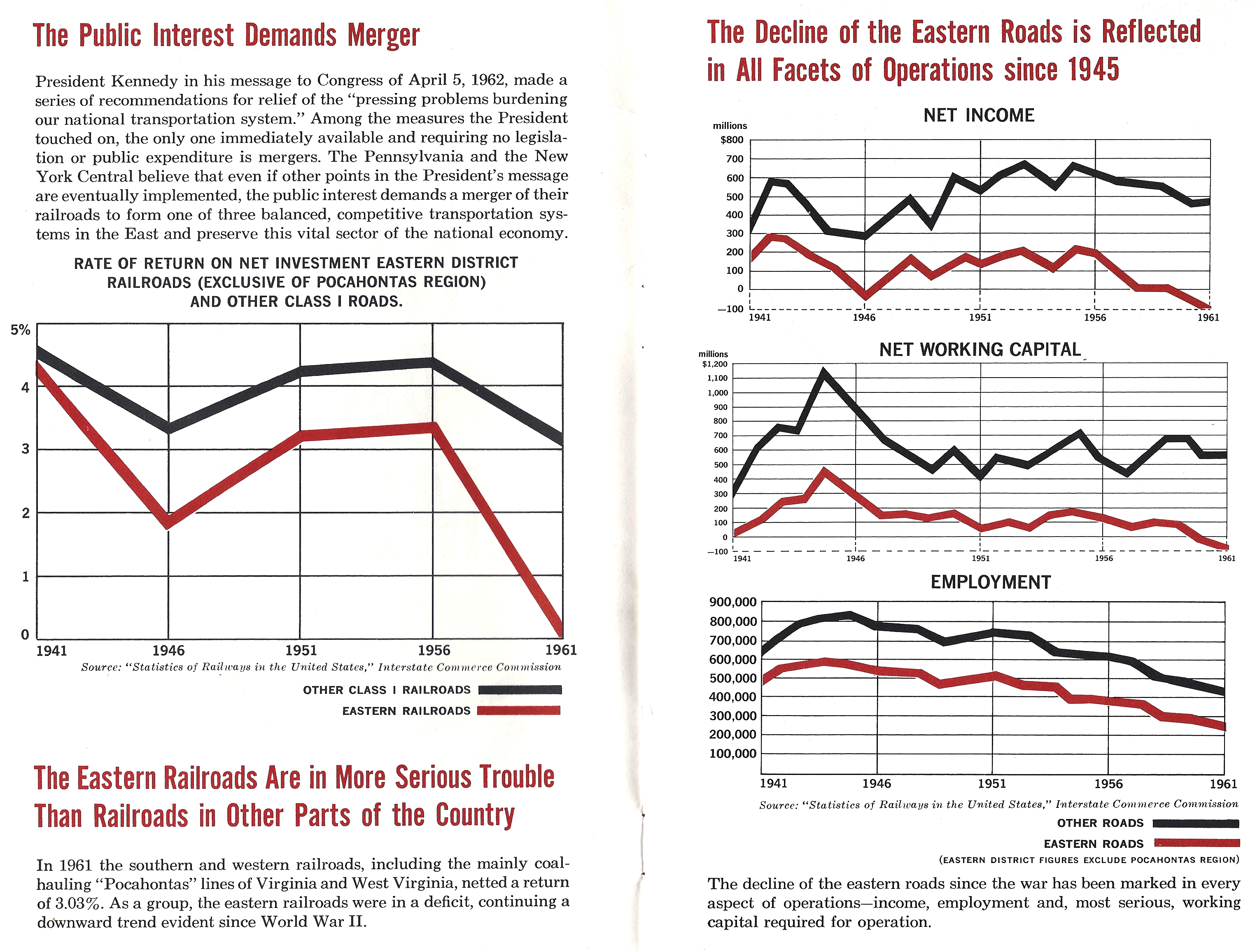
"Public Interest Demands Merger", a 1962 publicity booklet produced by the Penn Central Merger Information Committee

=== Pre-merger ===
The Penn Central railroad system developed in response to challenges facing northeastern American railroads during the late 1960s. While railroads elsewhere in North America drew revenues from long-distance shipments of commodities such as coal, lumber, paper and iron ore, railroads in the densely populated northeast traditionally depended on a heterogeneous mix of services, including:

- Commuter/intercity passenger rail service
- Railway Express Agency freight service
- Break-bulk freight service via boxcars
- Consumer goods and perishables (produce and dairy products)

These labor-intensive, short-haul services proved vulnerable to competition from automobiles, buses, and trucks, a threat recently invigorated by the new limited-access highways authorized in the Federal-Aid Highway Act of 1956. At the same time, contemporary railroad regulation restricted the extent to which U.S. railroads could react to the new market conditions. Changes to passenger fares and freight shipment rates required approval from the capricious Interstate Commerce Commission (ICC), as did mergers or abandonment of lines. Merger, which eliminated duplicative back office employees, seemed an escape.

The situation was particularly acute for the Pennsylvania (PRR) and New York Central (NYC) railroads. Both had extensive physical plants dedicated to their passenger custom. As that revenue stream faded following WWII, neither could slim their assets fast enough to earn a substantial profit (although the NYC came much closer).

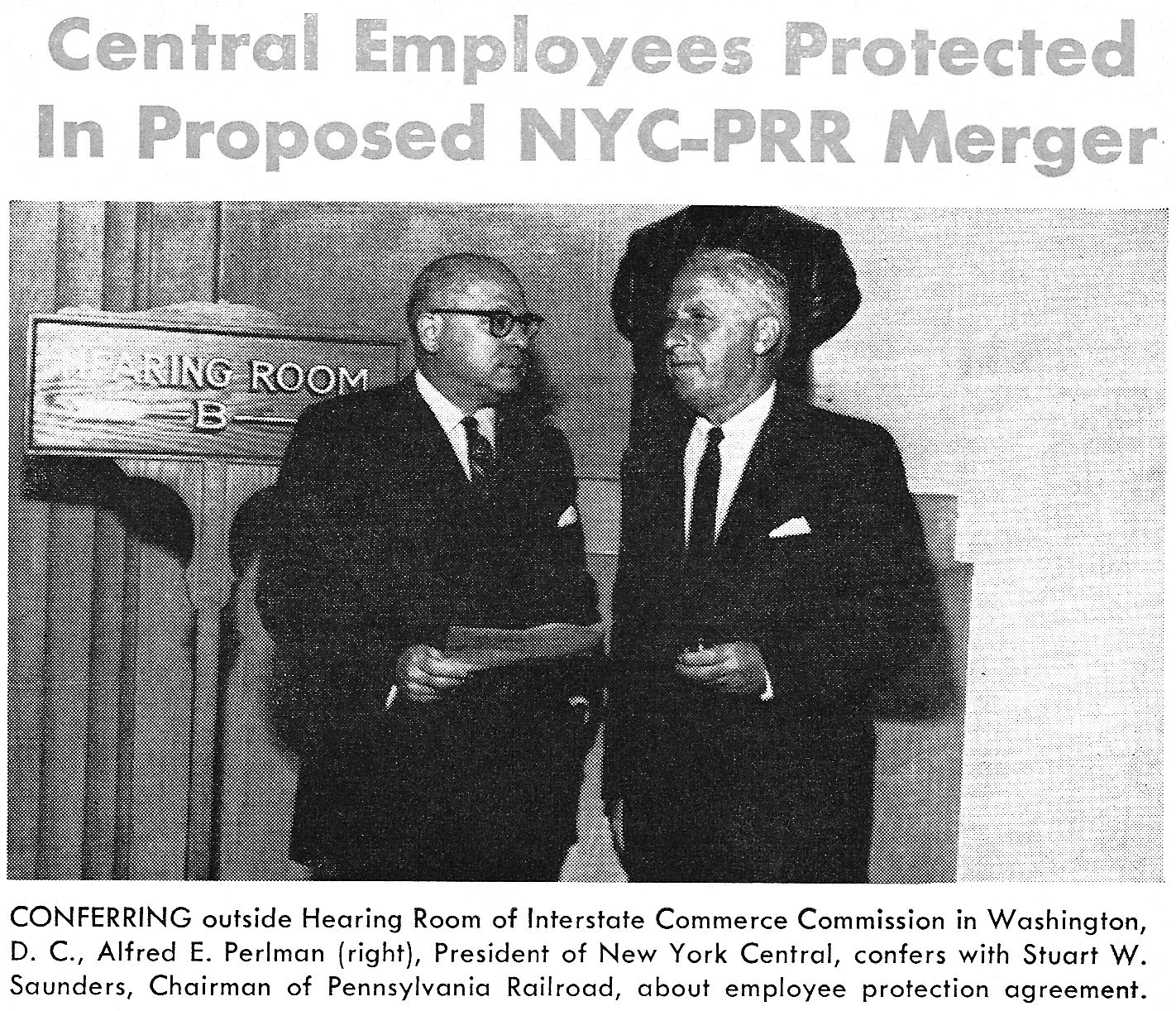
NYC president Alfred E. Perlman (right) confers with PRR chairman Stuart T. Saunders outside the Interstate Commerce Commission Hearing Room in Washington, D.C. about employee job security.

In 1957, the two proposed a merger, despite severe organizational and regulatory hurdles. Neither railroad had much respect for its merger partner; the lines had fought bitterly over New York-Chicago custom and ill-will remained in the executive suites. Amongst middle management, the company's corporate cultures all but precluded integration: a team of young, flexible managers had begun reshaping the NYC from a traditional railroad into a multimodal express-freight transporter, while the PRR continued to bet on a railroad revival. At a technical level, the two companies served independent markets east of Cleveland (running through their namesake states), but virtually identical trackage west of Cleveland meant any merger would have anticompetitive effect.

For decades, merger proposals had tried to balance the competitors instead, joining them with lesser partners end-to-end. The unexpected NYC+PRR proposal required all the northeastern railroads to reconsider their corporate strategy, clouding the waters for the ICC. The resulting negotiations took nearly a decade, and when the PRR and NYC merged, they faced three competitors of comparable size: the Erie had merged with the Delaware, Lackawanna and Western to create the Erie Lackawanna Railway (EL) in 1960, the Chesapeake and Ohio (C&O) acquired control of the Baltimore and Ohio (B&O) in 1963, and the Norfolk and Western Railway (N&W) absorbed several railroads, including the Nickel Plate and the Wabash, in 1964.

Regulators also required the new company to incorporate the bankrupt New York, New Haven and Hartford Railroad (NH) and New York, Susquehanna and Western Railway (NYS&W); if neither the N&W and C&O would buy the Lehigh Valley Railroad (LV), then that railroad would also be required to be incorporated. Ultimately, only the New Haven successfully joined the Penn Central; the conglomerate failed before it could incorporate the latter two. The only railroad leaving the Penn Central was the PRR's controlling interest in the N&W, whose dividends had generated much of the PRR's premerger profitability.

=== Merger begins ===
The legal merger (formally, an acquisition of the NYC by the PRR) concluded on February 1, 1968. The Pennsylvania Railroad, the nominal survivor of the merger, changed its name to Pennsylvania New York Central Transportation Company, and soon began using "Penn Central" as a trade name. That trade name became official a month later on May 8, 1968. Saunders later commented: "Because of the many years it took to consummate the merger, the morale of both railroads was badly disrupted and they were faced with unmanageable problems which were insurmountable. In addition to overcoming obstacles, the principal problem was too much governmental regulation and a passenger deficit which amounted to more than $100 million a year."

Almost immediately after the transaction cleared, the organizational headwinds presaged during the merger negotiations began to overwhelm the new corporation's management. As ex-PRR managers began to secure the plum jobs, the forward-thinking ex-NYC managers departed for greener pastures. Clashing union contracts prevented the company's left hand from talking to its right, and incompatible computer systems meant that PC classification clerks regularly lost track of train movements.

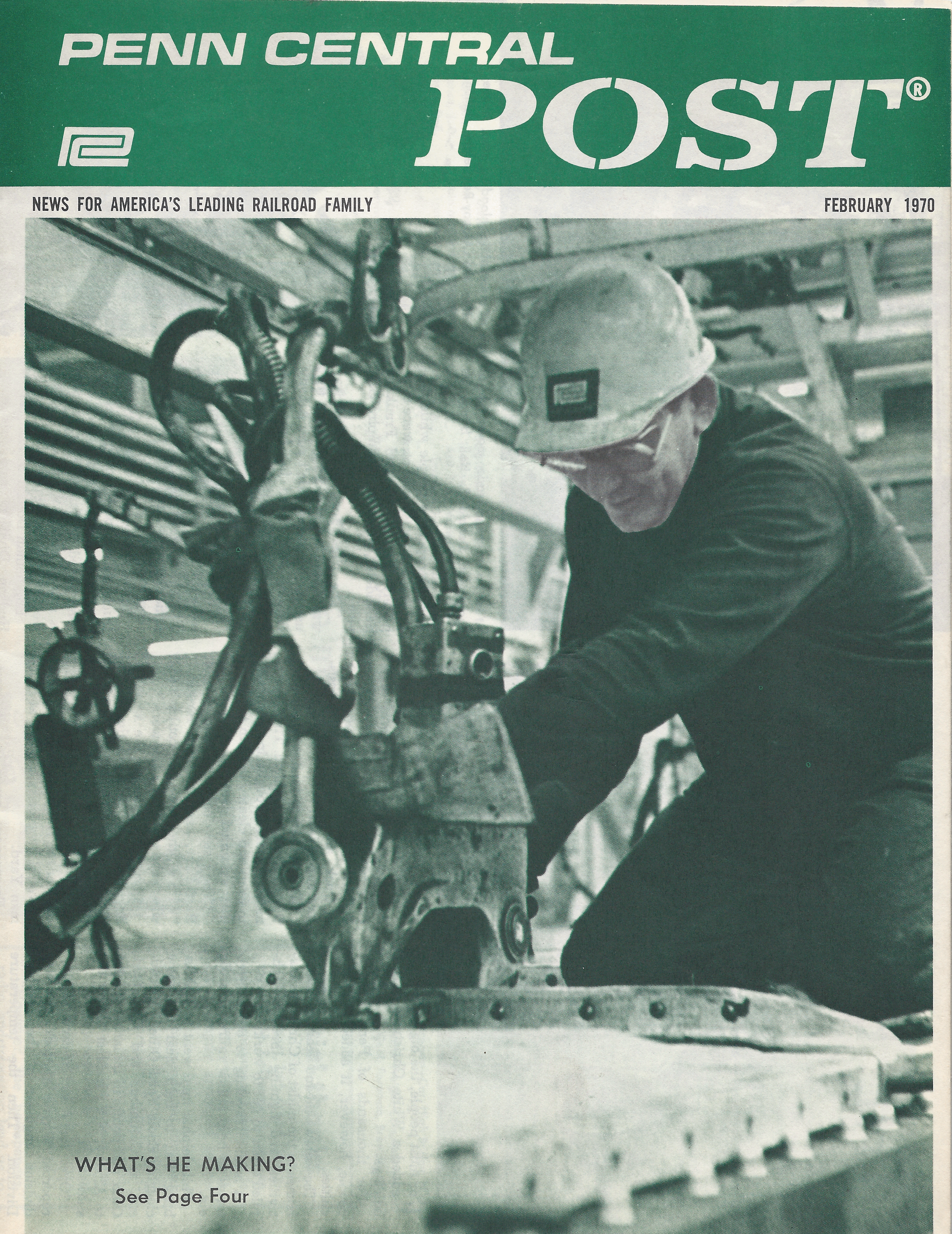
The February 1970 PC employee newsletter cover shows a sheet metal worker constructing a new boxcar.

Subpar track conditions, the result of years of deferred maintenance, deteriorated further, particularly in the Midwest. Derailments and wrecks occurred regularly; when the trains avoided mishap, they operated far below design speed, resulting in delayed shipments and excessive overtime. Operating costs soared, and shippers soured on the products. In 1969, most of Maine's potato production rotted in the PC's Selkirk Yard, hurting the Bangor and Aroostook Railroad, whose shippers vowed never to ship by rail again. Although both PRR and NYC had been profitable pre-merger, Penn Central was — at one point — losing $1 million per day.

As PC's management struggled to wrestle the company into submission, the structural headwinds facing all northeastern railroads continued unabated. The industrial decline of the Rust Belt consumed shippers through the Northeast and Midwest. Penn Central's executives tried to diversify the troubled firm into real estate and pipeline ventures, but due to these companies embarking on large expansion programs, none of them made any money for Penn Central until long after the bankruptcy had already happened. In the short term it only served to starve the railroad of over $100 million in cash, dry up lines of credit, and divert management attention away from the problems of the core business.

To create the illusion of success, management also insisted on paying dividends to shareholders, desperately borrowing funds to buy time for the business to turn around. Stuart Saunders also began pressuring the financial department to make the situation seem better. In 1968 and 1969 complex efforts were undertaken to conceal the company's true state from investors. For example, in 1969 Penn Central reported the railroad had lost $56 million, but that the parent company had made $4.3 million. These figures, however, varied widely depending on the intended audience. The Interstate Commerce Commission, after objecting to some of PC's accounting strategies, was told the railroad lost $67.8 million that year. The figures for internal management showed a $190.8 million loss. In 1970 some Nixon administration officials were told it was in fact $193 million. David C. Bevan, the Chief Financial Officer at one point informed the board that he believed the true figure was a $220 million loss. PC had arrived at the more flattering numbers largely by writing off the entire passenger department, along with some associated depreciation costs at a total value of $130.5 million, among other strategies. As a general rule Saunders pressured the financial department to record extraordinary profits as ordinary, and ordinary expenses as extraordinary. Similar tactics were used in 1968 to make a $145 million loss for the railroad look like only $2.8 million. As much as possible, this was kept secret. For the vast majority of the pre-bankruptcy period, not even the board of directors was aware of the railroad's true financial state.

All of this financial wrangling was technically legal thanks to the fact that the Securities and Exchange Commission (SEC) did not have purview over railroads. That was instead handled by the ICC, which was much more lenient when it came to creative accounting. Many banks were still wary of how unspecific their reports had become, and it would get progressively harder and harder to get loans as time went on.

On August 26, 1969, the board voted to replace Perlman with Paul Gorman, an executive from Western Electric, who they expected would be more in line with their vision for the company; with more money spent on diversification, as opposed to railroad investment. Perlman was made vice chairman of the board.

=== Bankruptcy ===
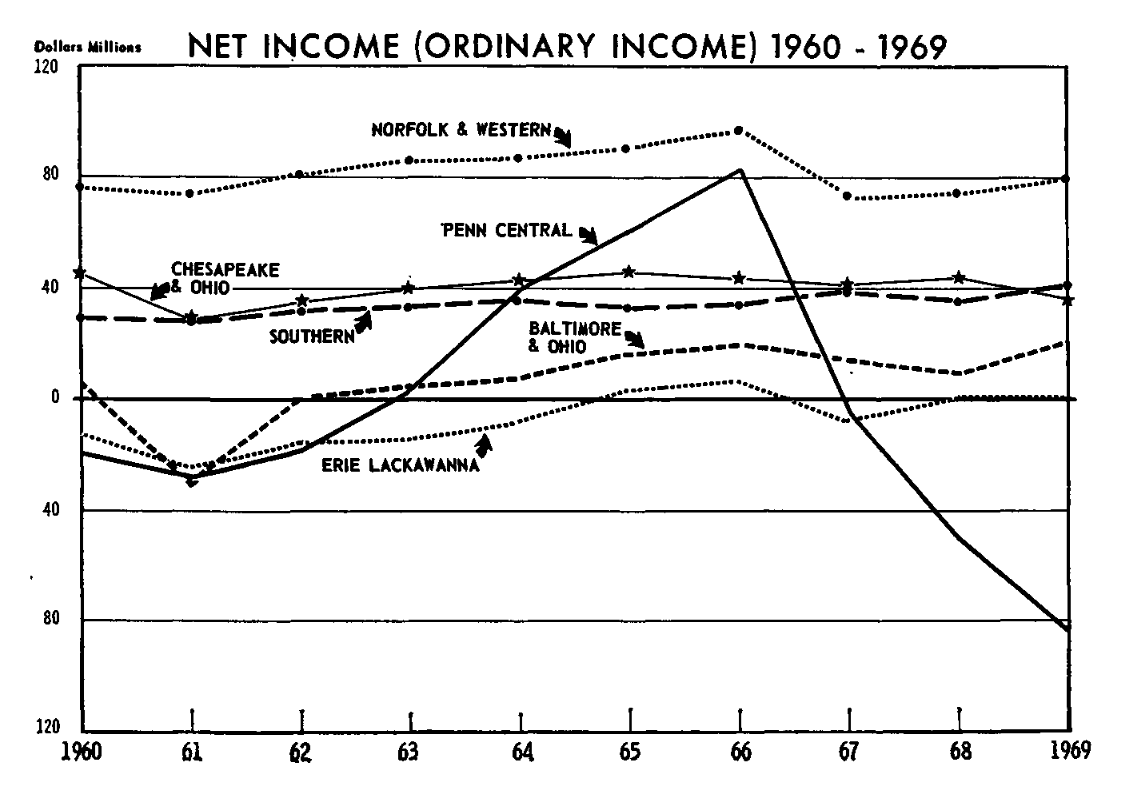
Incomes of select eastern railroads showing Penn Central's sudden decline.

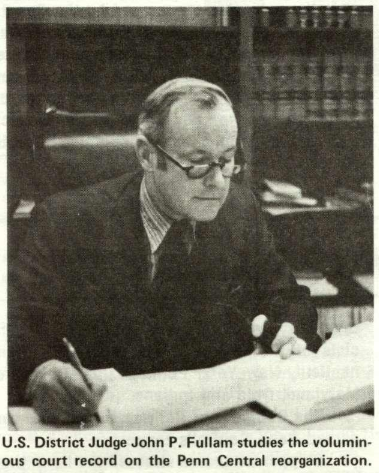
U.S. District Judge John P. Fullam was chosen to oversee the reorganization.

By early 1970, PC's financial condition had deteriorated significantly. Commercial banks had largely ceased extending credit, while approximately $150 million in outstanding debt matured that year. The railroad reported a loss exceeding $100 million in the first quarter of 1970. Bevan disclosed the full extent of the company's financial instability to Saunders, who subsequently initiated efforts to secure a federal loan guarantee. The company sought $750 million from Congress and, alternatively, proposed a $200 million direct loan from the Department of Defense, citing its status as a significant freight carrier for the U.S. military.

This strategy proved counterproductive. Federal officials required leadership changes as a precondition for any assistance. Saunders, assuming that Bevan's removal would satisfy the requirement, convened a board meeting. The board, however, elected to dismiss both men. Perlman, long viewed unfavorably by certain directors, was also removed at this time. Despite these actions, political opposition, particularly from southern lawmakers, resulted in the failure of both loan proposals. On June 21, 1970, with no viable alternatives remaining, the board of directors voted to file for bankruptcy protection under Section 77 of the Bankruptcy Act.

At the time of its filing, PC was the sixth-largest corporation in the United States. The bankruptcy constituted the largest corporate insolvency in U.S. history until Texaco in 1987. Railroad historian George H. Drury described the event as "cataclysmic", citing its systemic implications for both the railroad sector and the broader business community. The collapse occurred during a period of widespread retrenchment in passenger rail services, which had long represented Penn Central's core business. Railroads across the country discontinued intercity passenger operations as regulatory barriers diminished. The Rock Island and the Milwaukee Road, two major carriers with longstanding financial instability, soon declared bankruptcy.

Following the bankruptcy, new president Paul Gorman quickly resigned. Graham Claytor, president of the Southern Railway, proposed William H. Moore as a successor. Moore had been a protégé of former Southern Railway president D. William Brosnan, known for aggressive cost-cutting and confrontational management, both of which had gotten him ousted from the company some years earlier. Moore adopted similar practices at PC. Budget reductions were implemented across departments, capital improvement projects were canceled, and yard operations were scaled back. Track maintenance was minimized, and several unautomated hump yards were closed.

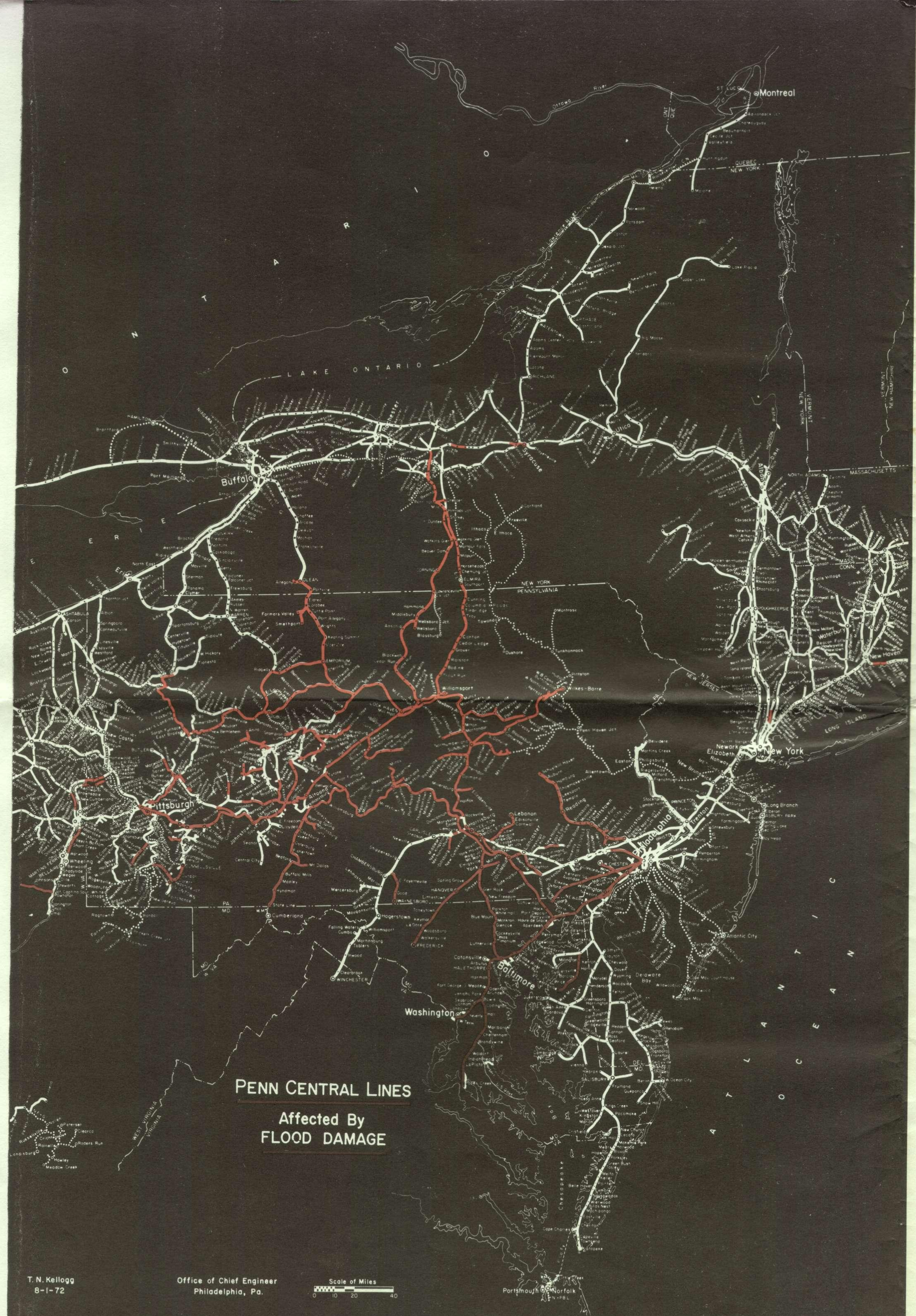
Map showing the extensive damage left by Hurricane Agnes in 1972.

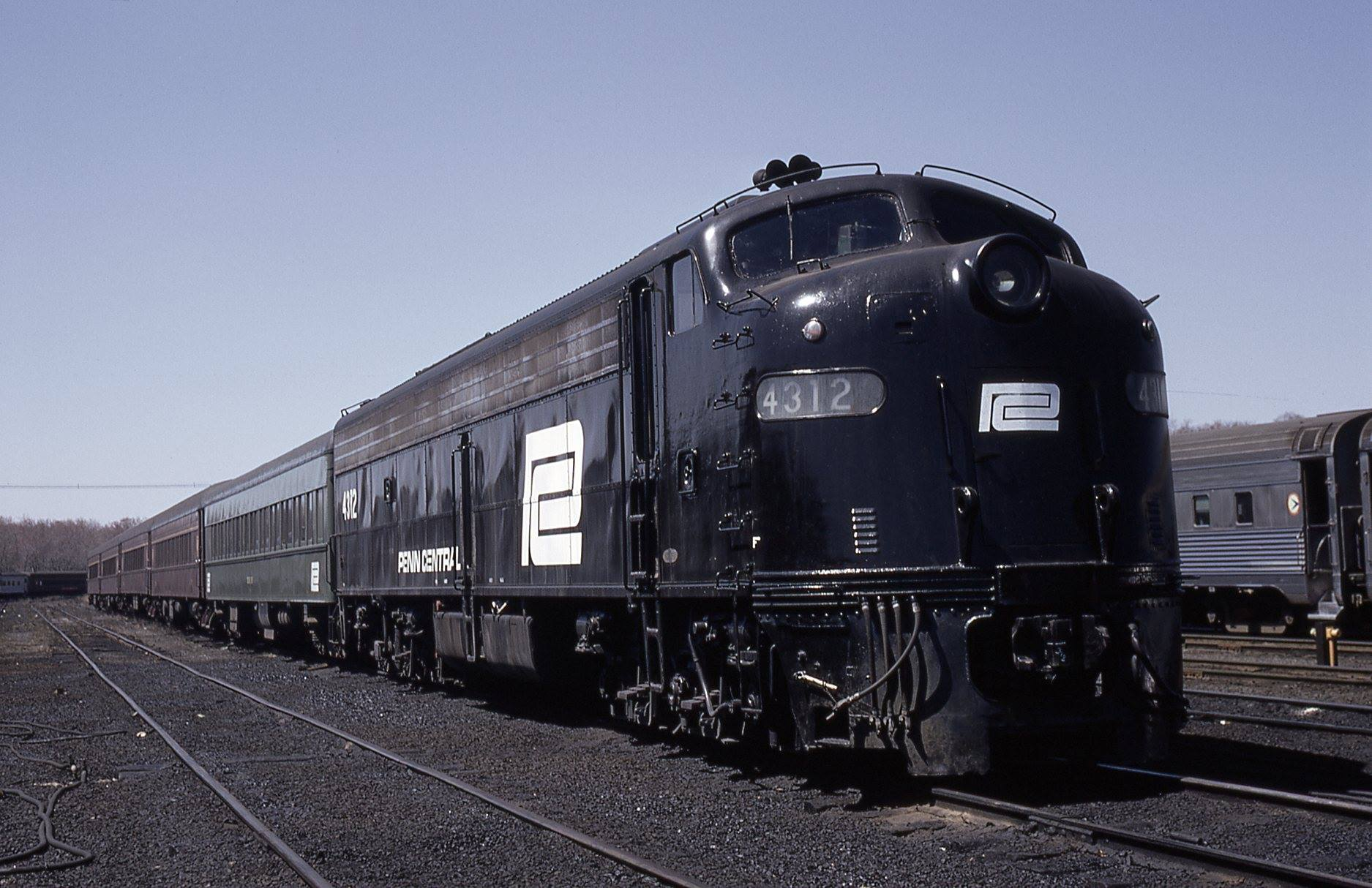
PC locomotive #4312, an EMD E8, at Bay Head yard, Bay Head, New Jersey, April 18, 1971.

In 1972, Hurricane Agnes inflicted widespread damage on PC infrastructure, including main lines and branch routes. The storm contributed to the collapse of other northeastern railroads. By the mid-1970s, few carriers remained solvent in the region east of Rochester and Pittsburgh, north of Philadelphia, and southwest of the Maine and New Hampshire border.

During this period, PC partnered with the U.S. Department of Transportation to test experimental passenger technologies on what would become the Northeast Corridor. The railroad continued operating PRR's Metroliner service between New York City and Washington, D.C., and introduced the United Aircraft TurboTrain between New York and Boston. These efforts failed to produce sustained improvements, primarily due to degraded track conditions and unreliable schedules. PC, as well as many other railroads, were still collectively losing hundreds of millions every year providing passenger trains. In response, the Nixon administration established Amtrak in 1971 to relieve railroads of their passenger service obligations.

In a separate effort to generate revenue, PC attempted to sell off air rights above Grand Central Terminal to private developers. The transaction was blocked by New York City, which had designated the terminal a landmark. In Penn Central Transportation Co. v. New York City (1978), the U.S. Supreme Court upheld the city's decision and ruled that the landmark designation did not constitute an unlawful taking of property.

By 1974, PC's physical infrastructure had deteriorated severely. Deferred maintenance and hurricane-related damage contributed to a significant increase in derailments, including 649 in January and 1,179 in February. The Cleveland hump yard reported an average of six derailments per day. Around this time there were alleged incidents of "standing derailments", in which rotted crossties would snap under the weight of an unmoving car. A 1973 inspection by the Federal Railroad Administration concluded that the railroad would need to cease operations soon if the situation did not improve.

Moore's leadership became increasingly controversial. A well known incident in December 1973 contributed to his removal. While traveling on a Metroliner between Washington and Philadelphia, Moore was informed that a coal train had derailed in the Baltimore and Potomac Tunnel in Baltimore. He called the division superintendent, and ordered the line cleared within one hour -- an impossible task. When that didn't happen, Moore fired the superintendent on the spot. Chief trustee Jervis Langdon Jr. heard about this event, and began looking for means to fire Moore. The reason Langdon eventually used to get him dismissed was that he had been using railroad employees to do work on his house, as well as secretly borrowing a corporate jet from the Scott Paper Company and having them bill the railroad for an equivalent amount of toilet paper.

In May 1974, the bankruptcy court determined that Penn Central's rail operations would not produce sufficient income to support reorganization. Under the Regional Rail Reorganization Act of 1973, the federal government assumed control of PC's railroad assets. The United States Railway Association, established for this purpose, spent two years evaluating the holdings of PC and six other bankrupt carriers, including Erie Lackawanna, the Central Railroad of New Jersey, and the Reading Company. On April 1, 1976, PC's viable rail operations were transferred to the federally owned Consolidated Rail Corporation (Conrail).

Despite federal intervention, freight railroads continued to lose market share to the trucking industry. Industry leaders and labor unions advocated for deregulation. The Staggers Rail Act of 1980 reduced federal oversight and enabled Conrail to implement route consolidations and productivity improvements. Former PC trackage that lacked economic viability was abandoned or repurposed for interim recreational rail trails. In 1987, following a return to profitability, Conrail stock was publicly offered. The company operated as a private entity until its acquisition and division by Norfolk Southern Railway and CSX Transportation in 1999.

During Penn Central's financial collapse, investor Max Heine bought substantial amounts of the company's bonds which traded as low as four cents on the dollar due to widespread pessimism. Heine's calculations showed despite Penn Central's financial troubles the company had more than enough assets to eventually earn a profit for bondholders, even if their freight cars and rails were sold for scrap. Heine ended up reaping large profits from the 1978 bankruptcy reorganization

== Corporate survival ==
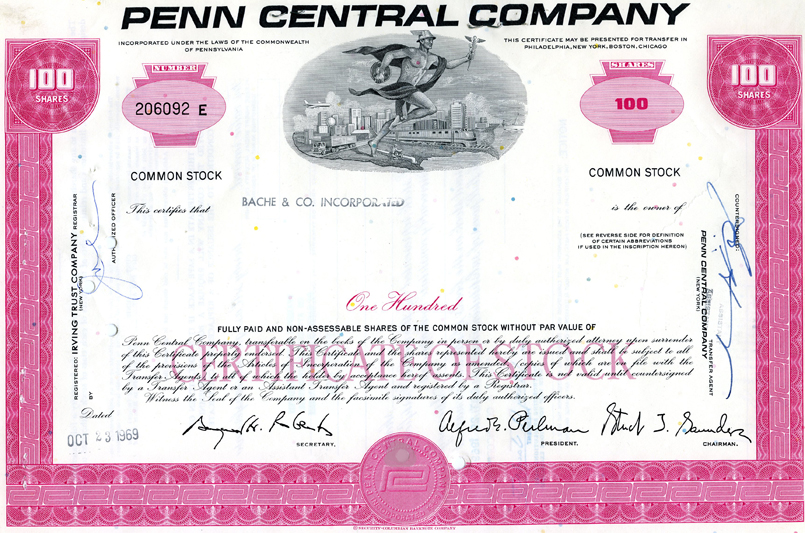
PC pre-bankruptcy stock certificate, 1969.

The Pennsylvania Railroad absorbed the New York Central Railroad on February 1, 1968, and at the same time changed its name to Pennsylvania New York Central Transportation Company to reflect this. The trade name of "Penn Central" was adopted, and, on May 8, the former Pennsylvania Railroad was officially renamed the Penn Central Company.

The first Penn Central Transportation Company (PCTC) was incorporated on April 1, 1969, and its stock was assigned to a new holding company called Penn Central Holding Company. On October 1, 1969, the Penn Central Company, the former Pennsylvania Railroad, absorbed the first PCTC and was renamed the second Penn Central Transportation Company the next day; the Penn Central Holding Company became the second Penn Central Company. Thus, the company that was formerly the Pennsylvania Railroad became the first Penn Central Company and then became the second PCTC.

The old Pennsylvania Company, a holding company chartered in 1870, reincorporated in 1958 and long a subsidiary of the PRR, remained a separate corporate entity throughout the period following the merger.

The former Pennsylvania Railroad, now the second PCTC, gave up its railroad assets to Conrail in 1976 and absorbed its legal owner, the second Penn Central Company, in 1978, and at the same time changed its name to The Penn Central Corporation. In the 1970s and 1980s, the company now called The Penn Central Corporation was a small conglomerate that largely consisted of the diversified sub-firms it had before the crash.

Among the properties the company owned when Conrail was created were the Buckeye Pipeline and a 24 percent stake in Madison Square Garden (which stands above Penn Station) and its prime tenants, the New York Knicks basketball team and New York Rangers hockey team, along with Six Flags Theme Parks. Though the company retained ownership of some rights-of-way and station properties connected with the railroads, it continued to liquidate these and eventually concentrated on one of its subsidiaries in the insurance business.

The former Pennsylvania Railroad changed its name to American Premier Underwriters in March 1994. It became part of Carl Lindner's Cincinnati financial empire American Financial Group.

=== Grand Central Terminal ===
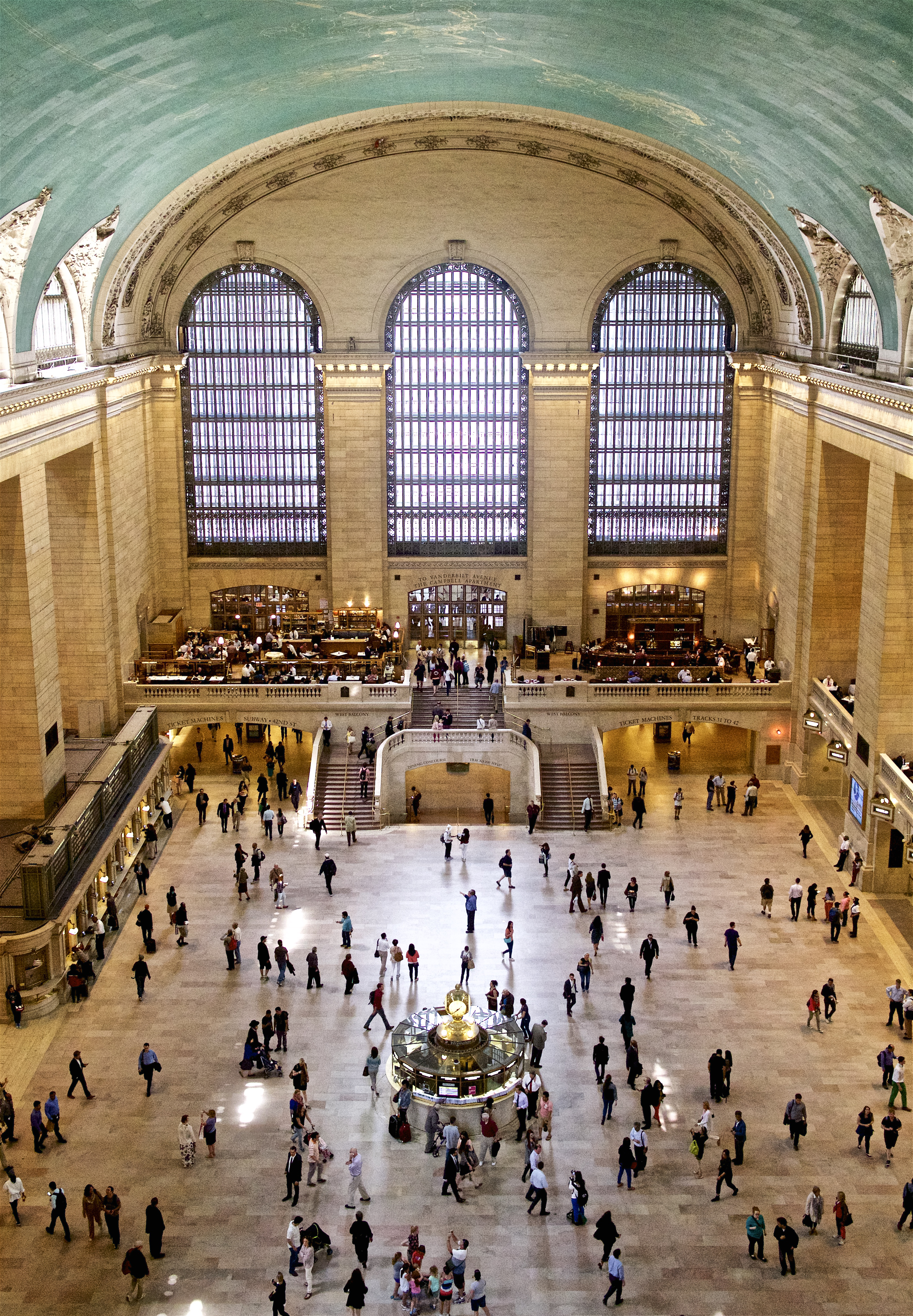
Main Concourse of Grand Central Terminal. The terminal was owned by Penn Central and its corporate successor until purchased by the MTA in 2018.

Until late 2006, American Financial Group still owned Grand Central Terminal, though all railroad operations were managed by the Metropolitan Transportation Authority (MTA). The U.S. Surface Transportation Board approved the sale of several of American Financial Group's remaining railroad assets to Midtown TDR Ventures LLC, an investment group controlled by Argent Ventures, in December 2006. The current lease with the MTA was negotiated to last through February 28, 2274. The MTA paid $2.4 million annually in rent in 2007 and had an option to buy the station and tracks in 2017, although Argent could extend the date another 15 years to 2032. The assets included the 156 miles (251 km) of rail used by the Hudson and Harlem Lines, and Grand Central Terminal, as well as unused development rights above the tracks in Midtown Manhattan. The platforms and yards extend for several blocks north of the terminal building under numerous streets and existing buildings leasing air rights, including the MetLife Building and Waldorf-Astoria Hotel.

In November 2018, the MTA proposed purchasing the Hudson and Harlem Lines as well as the Grand Central Terminal for up to $35.065 million, plus a discount rate of 6.25%. The purchase would include all inventory, operations, improvements, and maintenance associated with each asset, except for the air rights over Grand Central. The MTA's finance committee approved the proposed purchase on November 13, 2018, and the purchase was approved by the full board two days later. The deal finally closed in March 2020, with the MTA taking ownership of the terminal and rail lines.

== Heritage ==
Few railroad historians and former employees view the mega-railroad's brief existence favorably, and the company has little presence in the railroad enthusiast press. The preservation group Penn Central Railroad Historical Society was formed in July 2000 to preserve the history of the often-scorned company.

As part of Norfolk Southern Railway's 30th anniversary, the railroad painted 20 new locomotives utilizing former liveries of predecessor railroads. Unit number 1073, a SD70ACe, is painted in a Penn Central Heritage scheme.

As part of the 40th anniversary of the Metro-North Railroad, four locomotives were painted in a different heritage scheme to honor a predecessor railroad. Locomotive 217 was painted in the Penn Central Blue and Yellow scheme.

== Notable Officers ==
Name	Position	From	To
Stuart T. Saunders	CEO, Chairman	Feb 1, 1968	Jun 8, 1970
Alfred E. Perlman	President	Feb 1, 1968	Nov 30, 1969
Alfred E. Perlman	Vice Chairman	Nov 30, 1969	Jun 8, 1970
David C. Bevan	CFO	Feb 1, 1968	Jun 8, 1970
Paul A. Gorman	President	Dec 1, 1969	Aug 11, 1970
William H. Moore	President	Sep 1, 1970	Jan 4, 1974
Jervis Langdon Jr.	Trustee	Jul 22, 1970	Jan 11, 1974
Jervis Langdon Jr.	President	Jan 11, 1974	Apr 1, 1976
Robert W. Blanchette	Trustee	Jan 11, 1974	Oct 24, 1978
W. Willard Wirtz	Trustee	Jul 22, 1970	Dec 28, 1974
George P. Baker	Trustee	Jul 22, 1970	Jun 18, 1974
John H. McArthur	Trustee	Jun 18, 1974	Oct 24, 1978
Richard C. Bond	Trustee	Jul 22, 1970	Oct 24, 1978

== See also ==
- History of rail transport in the United States
- Penn Central Transportation Co. v. New York City (1978 Supreme Court case)
