= Cincinnati AVP Pro Beach Volleyball Championship Series =

The Cincinnati AVP Pro Beach Volleyball Championship Series takes place at the Lindner Family Tennis Center in Mason, Ohio. The event features the top 150 men's and women's professional beach volleyball players in highly competitive and energized matches.
