= Carl Lindner Jr. =

American businessman

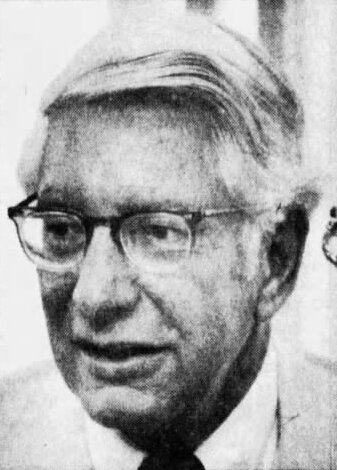
- Lindner circa 1983
- Born: Carl Henry Lindner Jr. April 22, 1919; Dayton, Ohio, U.S.
- Died: October 17, 2011 (aged 92); Cincinnati, Ohio, U.S.
- Occupation: Businessman
- Known for: Founder of American Financial Group
- Spouse: Edyth Bailey
- Children: Carl Lindner III; Craig Lindner; Keith Lindner
- Family: Lindner family

Carl Henry Lindner Jr. (April 22, 1919 – October 17, 2011) was an American businessman from Norwood, Ohio, a member of the Lindner family, and one of the world's richest people. According to the 2010 issue of Forbes Billionaires List, Lindner was worth an estimated $1.7 billion.

== Life and career ==
Lindner was born on April 22, 1919, in Dayton, Ohio. He grew up in Norwood, an enclave of Cincinnati, Ohio. His father gave him a management job at 14, when they expanded the family's dairy business into United Dairy Farmers, a large chain of convenience stores. With his three sons, he controlled roughly 42% of American Financial Group, a holding company based in Cincinnati whose primary business is insurance and investments.

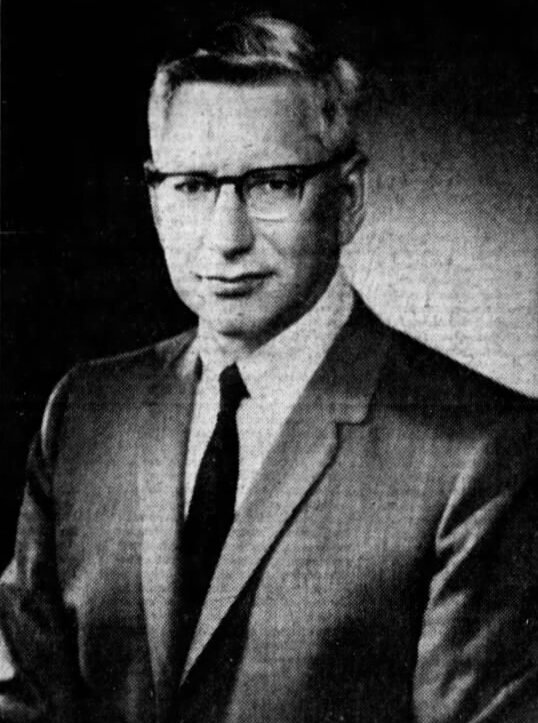
Lindner circa 1966

Lindner was a part-owner and chief executive officer of the Cincinnati Reds until he sold a majority interest to a group led by Robert Castellini on November 2, 2005, and stepped down as CEO. Lindner remained an active partner in the organization after the transaction. In 1997, Lindner was inducted into Junior Achievement's U.S. Business Hall of Fame.

== Philanthropy ==
Lindner donated to charitable causes and political campaigns. The Lindner family has supported several Cincinnati private schools, including Cincinnati Hills Christian Academy, which was founded by the Lindners. Lindner supports his Carl H. Lindner Business Honors program within the University of Cincinnati's College of Business, which was previously called the Carl H. Lindner Honors-PLUS program until it was changed by new leadership in the college of business. His Great American Insurance Company was once the title sponsor of the Cincinnati Masters tennis tournament. Phillips Chapel Church honored Lindner with the addition of the Carl Lindner Jr Fellowship Hall.

Most recently, in June 2011, the University of Cincinnati honored Lindner by renaming the College of Business the Carl H. Lindner College of Business after him in recognition of his and his family's contributions to the college, university, and business community.

Although Lindner was a devout Baptist, he was considered as one of the largest non-Jewish donors to the organized Jewish community in the United States. In 1978, he was named the Man of the Year by the United Jewish Appeal, and was later named a recipient of the Tree of Life Award for the Jewish National Fund, and was recognized as the largest non-Jewish purchaser of Israel Bonds. Lindner, who said an early loan from Isaac Wolfson inspired him to never forget his gratitude to the Jewish people, donated to such causes in multiple occasions, including $1 million in a 1991 fundraiser and $5 million in 2004.

In 1978, Lindner was the recipient of the Golden Plate Award of the American Academy of Achievement.

== Republican financial support ==
Lindner supported the Republican Party. During the 2004 election, the Lindner family contributed tens of thousands of dollars to Republicans, including the Republican National Committee and several politicians. In 2004, the Republican National Committee named Lindner as one of 62 "Super Rangers", the highest level of fundraising recognition, accorded to those who raise $300,000 or more. Lindner, an ally of George W. Bush, secured the use of Great American Ball Park for Bush's re-election campaign on October 31, 2004, two days before the 2004 Presidential Election.

In 2005, Lindner was among 53 entities that contributed the maximum of $250,000 to the second inauguration of President George W. Bush.

== Associations ==
Carl Lindner and his brother Robert used their family's dairy business to build a chain of convenience stores in Cincinnati, Ohio, called United Dairy Farmers (UDF). From there they went into the financial and communications fields. Through their holding company American Financial Group (AFG) they control Great American Insurance, a holding company for a group of property and life insurance companies that constitute the twenty-third largest insurer in the country. AFG owned the fourth-largest bank in Cincinnati, Provident Bank, and the second-largest savings and loan (Hunter Savings, later merged into Provident. The Lindners also control seventy shopping centers around Cincinnati. They once owned Bantam Books and the major newspaper of Cincinnati, The Cincinnati Enquirer. Charles Keating, also of Cincinnati, was a close friend and colleague of the Lindners.

Carl Lindner also had major investments in United Brands (formerly known as United Fruit - Chiquita Bananas which included plantations in El Salvador and other Central American countries.), Gulf+Western (later Paramount Communications, now part of Viacom and CBS Corporation), Warner Communications, Kroger (a major supermarket chain in the eastern U.S.), Great American Broadcasting, General Cable and Penn Central.

Whereas the Lindner companies and financial institutions once operated on conservative, cautious principles they later became involved in riskier ventures. Lindner insurance companies began to invest in junk bonds and other Lindner companies began to issue junk bonds. The SEC noted that Lindner companies were the single largest filers of new issues of securities in the U.S. Lindner was repeatedly accused of self-dealing in the corporations under his control; e.g., having such a corporation give him a private aircraft. He became closely associated with Michael Milken and the others in the junk bond field to the extent that his financial institutions invested in the junk bonds of the others. He and others actively engaged in public relations efforts to present an image of fiscal propriety to the general public.

== Death ==
Carl Lindner Jr. died on October 17, 2011, at age 92. He was surrounded by his wife, the former Edyth Bailey; his sons, Carl III, Craig and Keith; 12 grandchildren; and six great-grandchildren.
