= Andrew S. Penson =

American businessman from New York City

- Born: Andrew Seth Penson
- Education: State University of New York at Stony Brook; New York Law School
- Occupation: Real estate investor
- Spouse: Shannon

Andrew S. Penson is an American businessman from New York City. He is a real estate developer and investor in commercial real estate projects.

Penson has been an active participant in a number of high-profile real estate transactions. Penson founded Argent Ventures, which has acquired Grand Central Terminal in New York City, the Capitol Records Building in Hollywood, California, and other buildings. Penson engages in philanthropy through his foundation.

== Early life and education ==
Penson grew up on the East Side of Manhattan; his father was "a businessman who specialized in converting rental apartments into co-ops." Penson received a B.A. from the State University of New York at Stony Brook. He received his J.D. cum laude from New York Law School in June 1984.

== Argent Ventures ==
Penson is the founder and president of Argent Ventures, a privately held real estate company based in New York City that has ownership of Grand Central Terminal, the land beneath it and around 156 miles of Metro-North Railroad tracks in the New York City metropolitan area. As of 2013, Argent has invested over $2.5 billion in real estate, mostly in New York, California, Florida, and the District of Columbia. Partnering with Oak Tree Capital Management, Millennium Partners and Morgan Stanley, among other large corporations. Argent owns Omni International Mall in Miami, Florida and the Capitol Records Building in Hollywood, California. He has been involved in other high-profile real estate transactions, including the Manhattan Mall building in Midtown West, Manhattan; the building was sold for $689 million in 2006. In 2013 Argent placed a $710 million bid on a portfolio that included the Empire State Building.

In 1998, Penson unsuccessfully bid for ownership of the Washington Redskins football team, offering $450 million.

== Philanthropy ==
Penson and his wife Shannon are the founders of AGT Penson Foundation, a charitable foundation that supports Jewish religious institutions (such as congregations); educational institutions (such as Jewish day schools) and youth organizations.

== Personal life ==
Penson is an Orthodox Jew. He observes the Jewish Sabbath and has raised funds for United Jewish Appeal. Penson and his wife Shannon are known for keeping a low profile and for not seeking publicity.
