= Jeff Berding =

American sports executive & politician (born 1967)

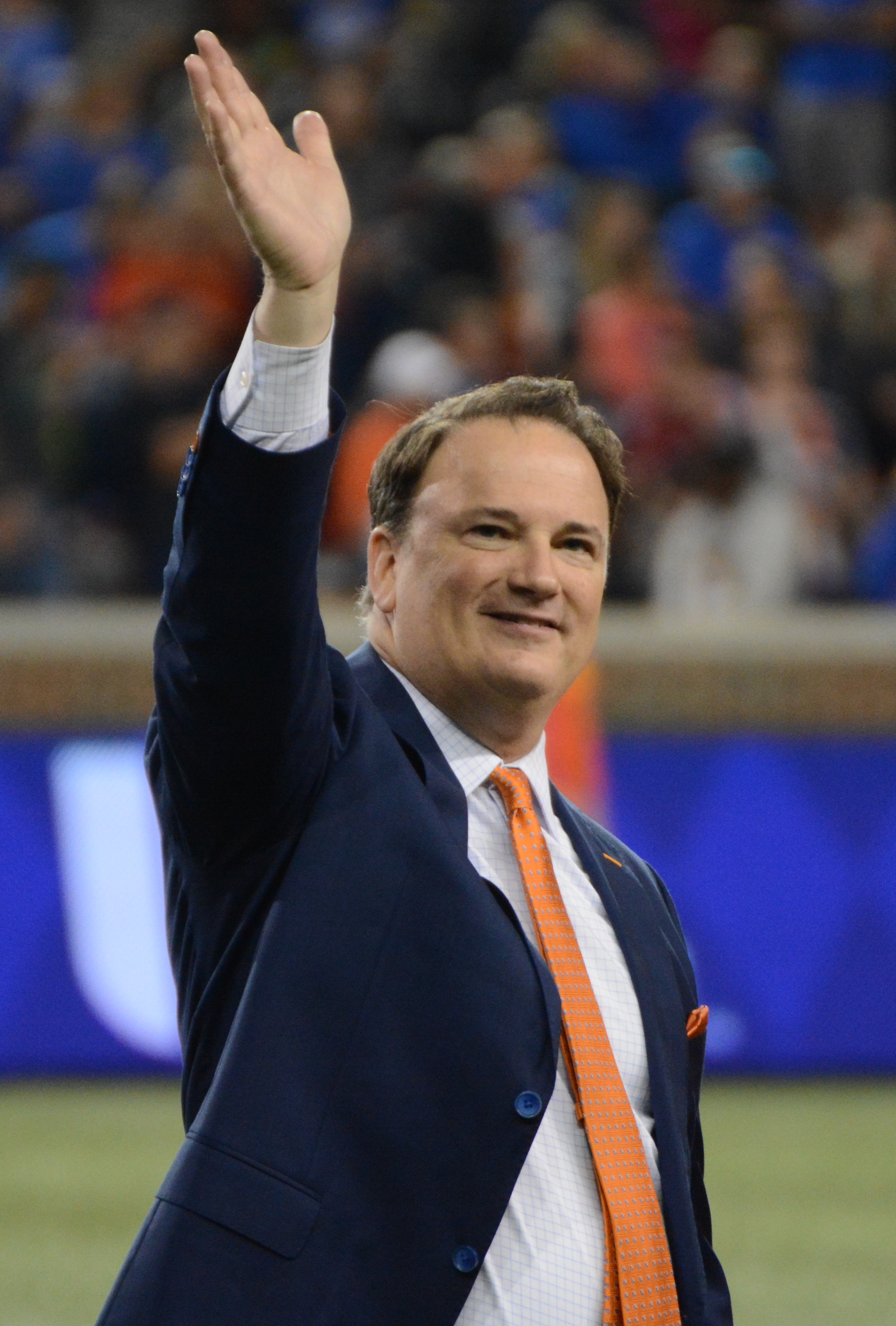
- Berding at an FC Cincinnati match in 2018
- Born: G. Jeffrey Berding; February 8, 1967 (age 59); Westwood, Ohio, U.S.
- Education: Miami University
- Occupation: Co-CEO of FC Cincinnati
- Political party: Democratic
- Spouse: Lindsay Bumbaugh (m. 2009)

Member of Cincinnati City Council
- In office December 2005 – March 2011

G. Jeffrey Berding (born February 8, 1967) is an American sports executive and politician. He serves as co-chief executive officer of FC Cincinnati, a professional soccer team he co-founded in 2015. He is also a Democratic politician, having served on the Cincinnati City Council from 2005 to 2011. From 1996 to 2015, he worked as an executive for the Cincinnati Bengals. Berding is currently serving as a board member of the Cincinnati Art Museum, St. Xavier High School, and Xavier University. He most recently served as board chair of Visit Cincy.

== Early life ==
Jeff Berding grew up in the Westwood neighborhood of Cincinnati, Ohio, with nine siblings. Berding became interested in sports at an early age and played basketball, baseball, and soccer in school. He graduated from St. Xavier High School in Cincinnati in 1985 and attended Miami University. He received his MBA from Xavier University.

== Sports career ==
=== Cincinnati Bengals (1996–2015) ===
Berding was an executive with the Cincinnati Bengals for 19 years, starting in 1996 after working on a sales tax initiative that would fund construction of Paul Brown Stadium and Great American Ball Park. He left his position as Director of Sales & Public Affairs in July 2015 to found the new soccer club FC Cincinnati.

=== FC Cincinnati (2015–present) ===
In August 2015, news broke of the formation of a United Soccer League franchise team to be located in Cincinnati and begin play in spring 2016, with Jeff Berding as president and general manager. Upon launching, FC Cincinnati was quickly noted for its unusually high attendance, frequently outdrawing Major League Soccer matches and breaking league records.

In October 2017, Berding spoke at a Hamilton County Commissioners public hearing on major projects to advocate for public funding to build a new stadium for FC Cincinnati to play in, should the club's bid to join Major League Soccer as an expansion team succeed.

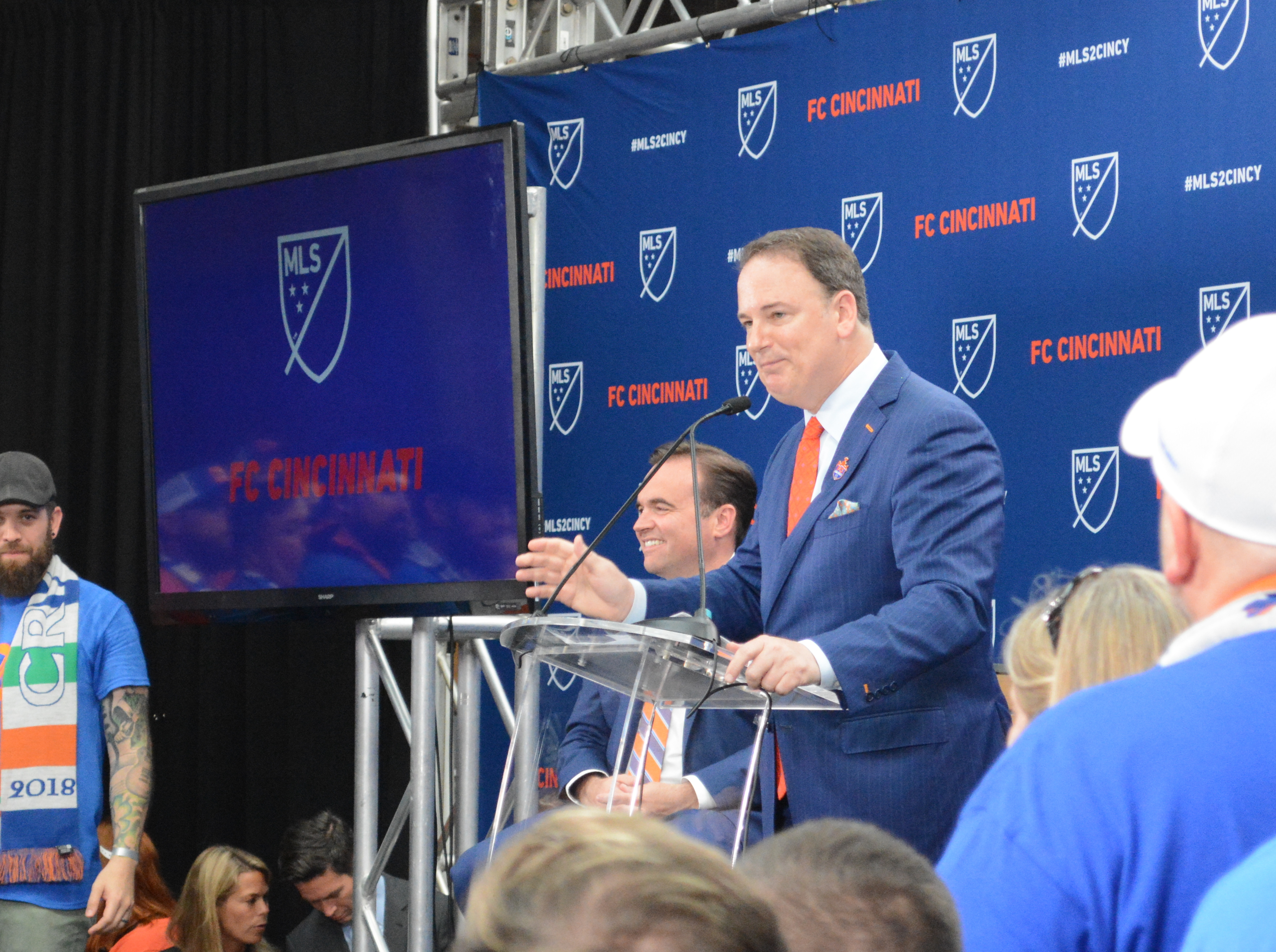
Berding speaking at the announcement of FC Cincinnati's MLS expansion franchise

FC Cincinnati was officially granted a Major League Soccer franchise on May 29, 2018, to begin play in 2019. Berding retained his positions as president and general manager through the transition from USL to MLS. However, on May 30, 2019, FC Cincinnati announced they had hired Gerard Nijkamp to take over Berding's general manager responsibilities. Berding said Nijkamp was hired for his lifelong soccer expertise which Berding lacked. Berding remained the club's president and shifted his work focus to the business and branding side of the club.

In January 2022, he was promoted to co-chief executive officer of the club, serving alongside club owner Carl Lindner III.

== Political career ==
Berding was elected to a two-year term on the Cincinnati City Council in 2005 in his first campaign for political office. He previously worked for Senator John Glenn and on other political campaigns. In the 2005 election, Berding raised the most money of all the candidates in the race. Although he is a Democrat, the council seats are nonpartisan. He served as Chair of the Rules and Government Operations Committee, Vice-chair of the Finance Committee, and was a member of the Law and Public Safety Committee and the Economic Development Committee.

In 2009, the local Democratic Party withdrew its endorsement of Berding.

In January 2011, Berding announced that he would soon resign from his council position, citing a desire to focus on his position with the Cincinnati Bengals. He stayed on the council for two more months before officially resigning in March.

== Honors ==
In September 2016, the Ohio Valley Chapter of the National Multiple Sclerosis Society named Jeff Berding that year's recipient of the Silver Hope Award.

In his State of the City speech in October 2016, Cincinnati mayor John Cranley named Jeff Berding and Carl Lindner III as the shared holders of the Cincinnatian of the Year award for their work managing FC Cincinnati.

== Personal life ==
Jeff Berding has three children – Allie, Jack, and Grace. He married Lindsay Bumbaugh in 2009.
