= United Dairy Farmers =

American convenience store chain

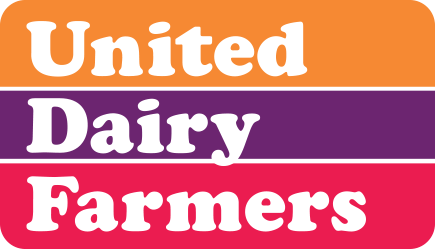
- Type: Privately held
- Industry: Dairy products Convenience stores
- Founded: 1938; 88 years ago
- Founder: Carl Lindner Sr.
- Headquarters: Cincinnati, Ohio, United States
- Number of locations: 210
- Area served: Ohio, Kentucky, Indiana
- Products: Homemade Brand Ice Cream
- Owner: Lindner family
- Website: http://www.udfinc.com

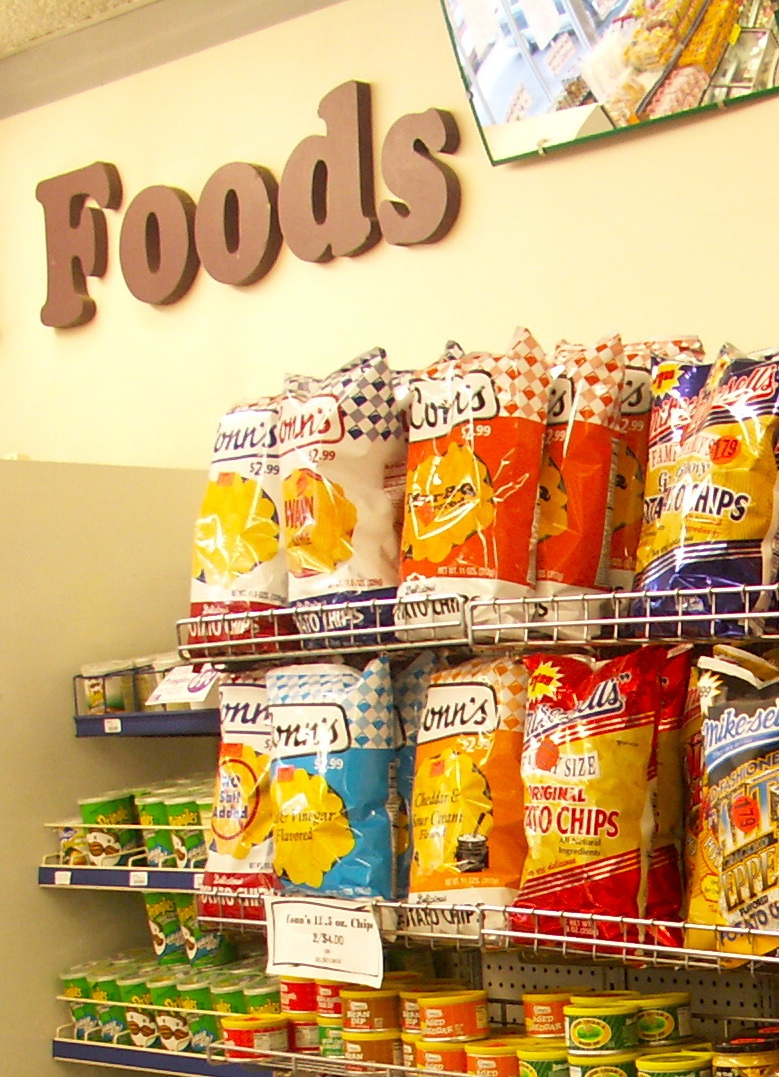
Potato chips for sale at a UDF store in Columbus, Ohio

United Dairy Farmers (UDF) is an American chain of shops offering dairy products as well as coffee and gasoline. UDF was started by Carl Lindner Sr. and his children in 1938. Almost as soon as they started operations, the Lindners began work on building a dairy store. Carl Sr. believed that if he could sell milk through his own store, he would not have to deal with delivery middlemen and thus pass the resulting savings on to customers. The first United Dairy Farmers store, at 3955 Main Avenue (now Montgomery Road) in Norwood, Ohio, a suburb of Cincinnati, opened on May 8, 1940.

Today, the chain has stores throughout the Greater Cincinnati area as well as Dayton, and Columbus. In addition to dairy products, UDF stores are also convenience stores, with some operating a gas station as well. All locations have a full-service dairy counter where customers can purchase ice cream by the scoop, sundaes, and milkshakes, with some locations offering a limited seating area as well. Some locations also have hot food made in-store. Since 2001, many locations have sold gasoline under the Mobil brand, but are now supplying their own fuels via purchasing through independent wholesalers.

UDF was sued in June 2013 by The Wendy's Company for a trademark dispute concerning their Frosty treats, claiming UDF and their Homemade brand were creating a ripoff product called Frosties that used the similar yellow and red colors of their Frosty. The companies settled out of court, with UDF ceasing to use the Frosties name.

In April 2017, UDF left the Cleveland market and sold its four stores to Uptown Mart. In the summer of 2017, UDF teamed up with Cincinnati brewery Rhinegeist and released a beer flavored ice cream called Tropical Truth, using Rhinegeist Truth IPA.
