= Home 365 =

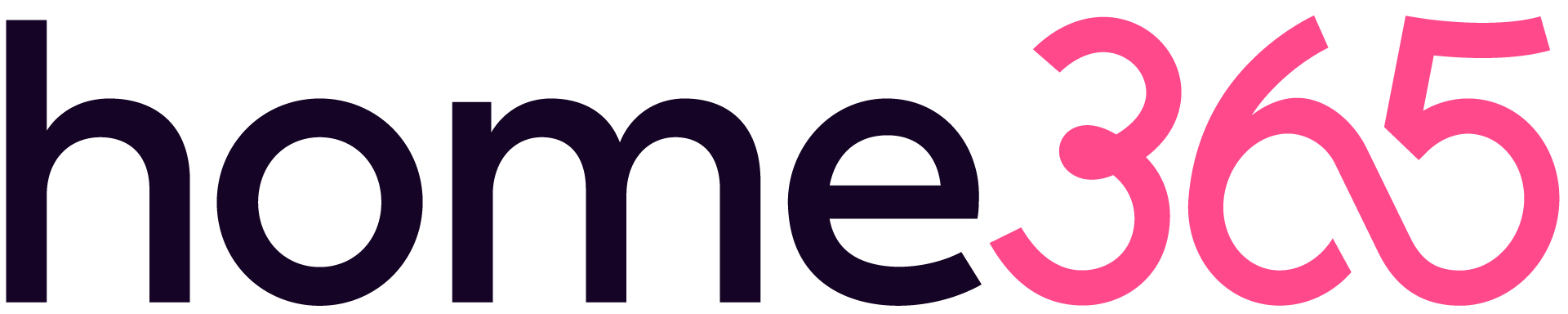
- Type: Private
- Industry: Real estate, Property management
- Founded: 2016
- Founder: Daniel Shaked
- Headquarters: US,
- Key people: Daniel Shaked (founder and CEO)
- Services: Property Management, Rent Guarantee, Home Warranty, Property Management Software
- Website: www.home365.co

Home 365 is a real estate property management company headquartered in the US, with a research and development center in Israel. The company developed a vertical SaaS technology to operate SFR (Single Family Rentals) Property Management & Real Estate investing.

== History ==
Home 365 was founded in 2016 by Daniel Shaked. In June 2021, Home365 acquired a U.S.-based SlateHouse Property Management. As of 2024, the company provided more than $1.5 million in rent guarantees, and covered $1.4 million in repairs. The company has 18 locations across nine states, including its recent expansion to Phoenix.

== Overview ==
It offers services to help real estate investors manage costs related to vacancy, delinquency, and property operations. Using AI, it helps the investors with real estate investing, acquisition of investment properties, and property management of the assets. It analyzes 40 data points such as property age, size and location to evaluate asset performance. It also handles key aspects of property ownership, including management, maintenance, and operational costs. The company uses data analysis to predict maintenance incidents and manage properties. It maintains a network of vendors that perform maintenance tasks, with the aim of reducing handling times.

== Funding ==
As of 2024, Home365 has raised $70 million across multiple funding rounds. This includes an $11 million Series A round in 2021 led by Greensoil PropTech Ventures, followed by a $22 million round in 2023 led by Viola Growth.
