= Capitol Records Building =

Building in Los Angeles, California, US

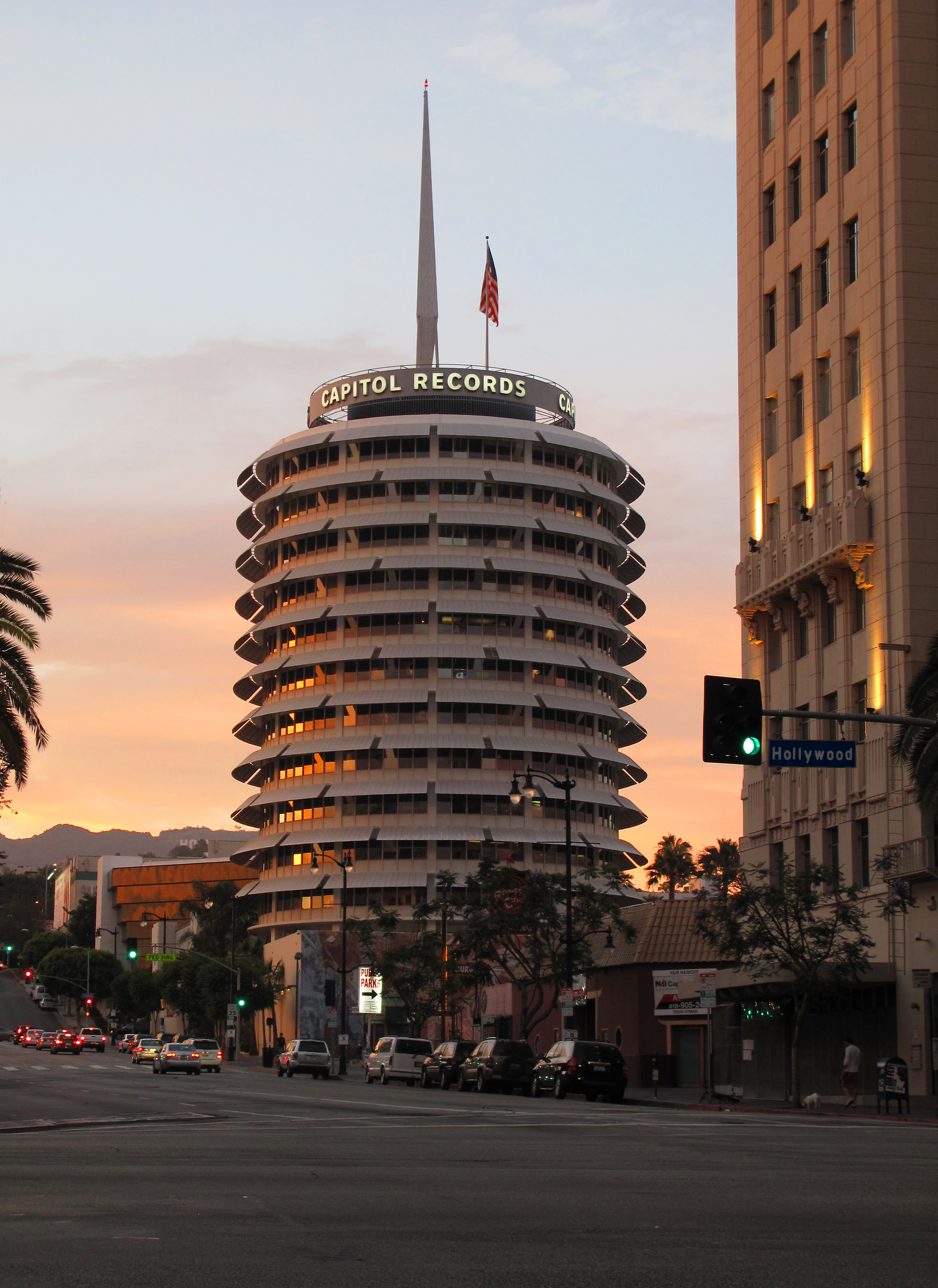
- Alternative names: Capitol Records Tower; Capitol Tower

General information
- Type: Commercial offices
- Architectural style: Googie
- Location: 1750 Vine Street; Hollywood, California; 90028
- Coordinates: 34.103085°N 118.326189°W
- Construction started: 1955
- Completed: 1956
- Owner: Argent Ventures 50% Universal Music Group 50%

Height
- Antenna spire: 46 m (151 ft)

Technical details
- Floor count: 13
- Lifts/elevators: 3

Design and construction
- Architects: Louis Naidorf; Welton Becket and Associates

Other information
- Public transit: Hollywood/Vine

U.S. National Register of Historic Places
- Designated: September 26, 2024
- Reference no.: 100010883

Los Angeles Historic-Cultural Monument
- Designated: November 15, 2006
- Reference no.: 857

The Capitol Records Building, also known as the Capitol Records Tower, is a 13-story tower building in the Hollywood neighborhood of Los Angeles, California, United States. Designed by Louis Naidorf of Welton Becket Associates, it is one of the city's landmarks and is listed on the National Register of Historic Places. Construction began soon after British music company EMI acquired Capitol Records in 1955, and was completed in April 1956. Located just north of the Hollywood and Vine intersection, the Capitol Records Tower houses the consolidation of Capitol Records' West Coast operations and is home to the recording studios and echo chambers of Capitol Studios. The building was designated as a Los Angeles Historic-Cultural Monument in 2006 and sits in the Hollywood Boulevard Commercial and Entertainment District. The Capitol Records Building, designed by architect Louis Naidorf is considered to be the world's first circular office building ever constructed.

The building is known as "The House That Nat Built" due to the vast number of records and merchandise Nat King Cole sold for the company.

== Design ==
The building's design is based on the graduate school drawings of Louis Naidorf who, as the primary architect, designed the first circular office building when he was 24 years old. The wide curved awnings over windows on each story and the tall spike emerging from the top of the building resembles a stack of records on a turntable with the spindle pointing skyward. This resemblance, however, was coincidental, as Welton Becket kept the client's identity secret. Upon first seeing the design, Capitol Records' president Glen Wallichs insisted on a rectangular building, so Naidorf provided Wallichs with both. Wallichs presented both designs to his lender, who felt the round design would attract attention, which would make it easier to lease. Wallichs conceded, choosing Naidorf's initial round design. The rectangular ground floor is a separate structure, joined to the tower after completion.

The 13-story building conforms to the 150-foot (46 m) zoning height limit in place at the time of its construction. Height restrictions were lifted in 1956. The thirteenth floor of the tower is the "Executive Level" and is represented by an "E" in the building's two elevators.

=== Notable features ===
The blinking light atop the tower spells out the word "Hollywood" in Morse code. (.... --- .-.. .-.. -.-- .-- --- --- -..) This was an idea of Capitol's then-president, Alan Livingston, who wanted to advertise Capitol's status as the first record label with a base on the west coast. It was switched on by Leila Morse, granddaughter of Samuel Morse. During 1992, the light blinked "Capitol 50," in honor of the label's fiftieth anniversary. A black-and-white graphic of the building appeared on the albums of many Capitol recording artists, with the phrase, "From the Sound Capitol of the World".

In April 2011, Capitol Records and artist Richard Wyatt Jr. restored his Hollywood Jazz Mural on the south wall of the Capitol Records building. Restored in hand-glazed ceramic tile, the mural spans 26 by 88 feet (7.9 by 26.8 m) Entitled "Hollywood Jazz: 1945-1972", it presents "larger than life" images of a number of notable jazz musicians.

=== Capitol Studios ===
The building houses the Capitol Studios, a recording facility which includes eight echo chambers engineered by guitarist Les Paul and three main studios, A, B, and C. Frank Sinatra had a close association with the studios, and the Georg Neumann U 47 microphone he carried around with him is there, often used and maintained for studio sessions. The first album recorded in the tower was Frank Sinatra Conducts Tone Poems of Color. In 2012, Studio A received a new AMS Neve 88R mixing console, designed and built for Al Schmitt and Paul McCartney.

== Recent history ==
In September 2006, EMI sold the tower and adjacent properties for US$50 million to New York developer Argent Ventures. The studio claimed that noise from construction of a condominium threatened it, as well as an underground parking lot by building firm Second Street Ventures would have heavy equipment working within 18 feet (5.5 m) of its renowned underground echo chambers, which are themselves over 20 feet (6.1 m) below ground level.

In November 2012, Steve Barnett was announced as the new Chairman and CEO of the Capitol Music Group and the company stated his office would be in the building. This coincided with Capitol Music Group becoming part of Universal Music Group, assuring its new parent company two Los Angeles headquarters.

== Gallery ==
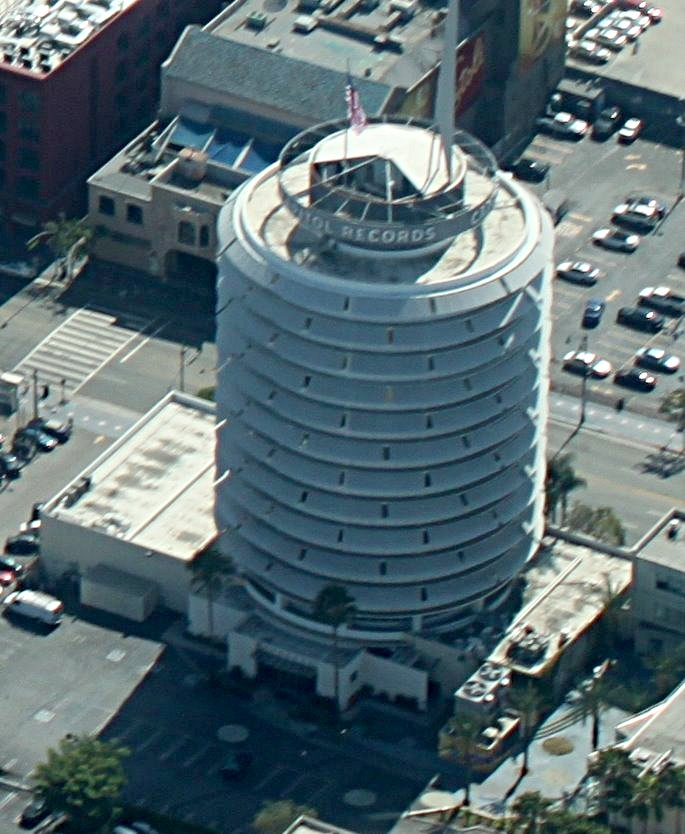
An aerial view of the Capitol Records Building

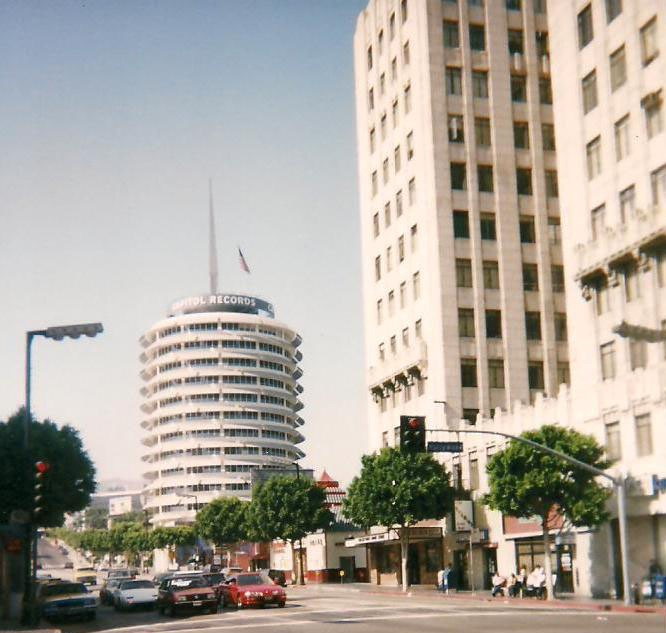
Viewed from Hollywood and Vine, 1997

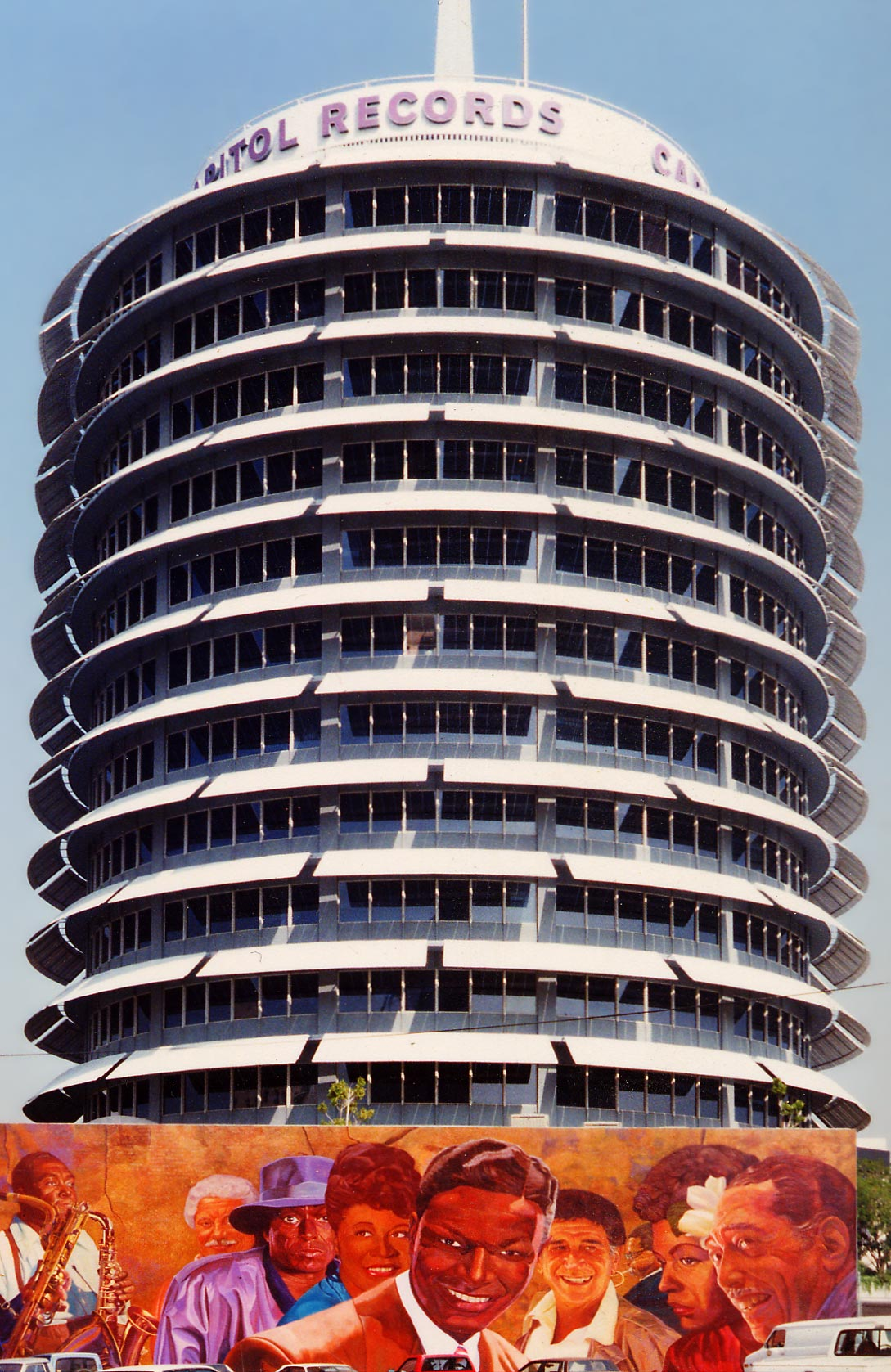
Parking lot mural titled Hollywood Jazz

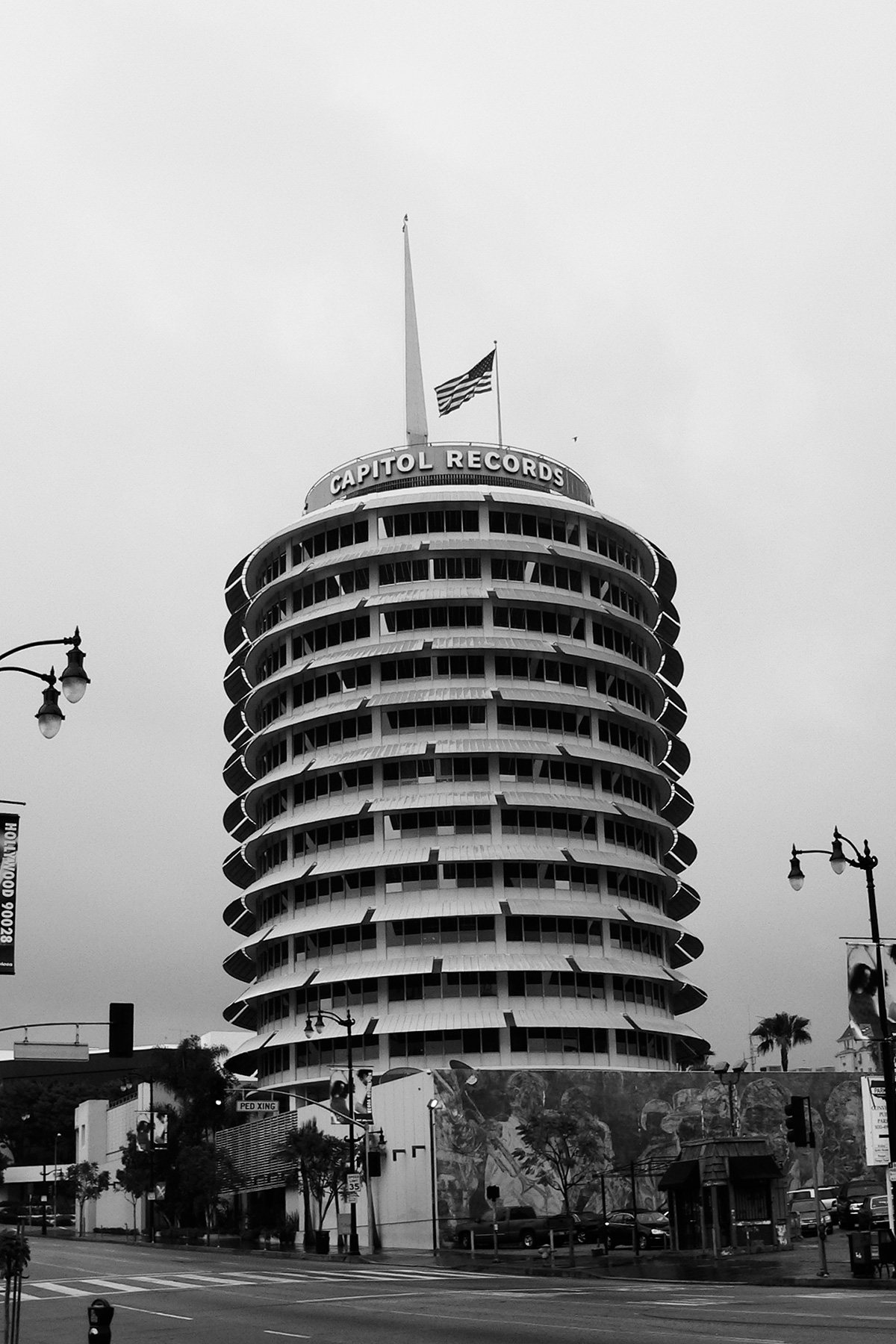
Taken on 2006-03-28

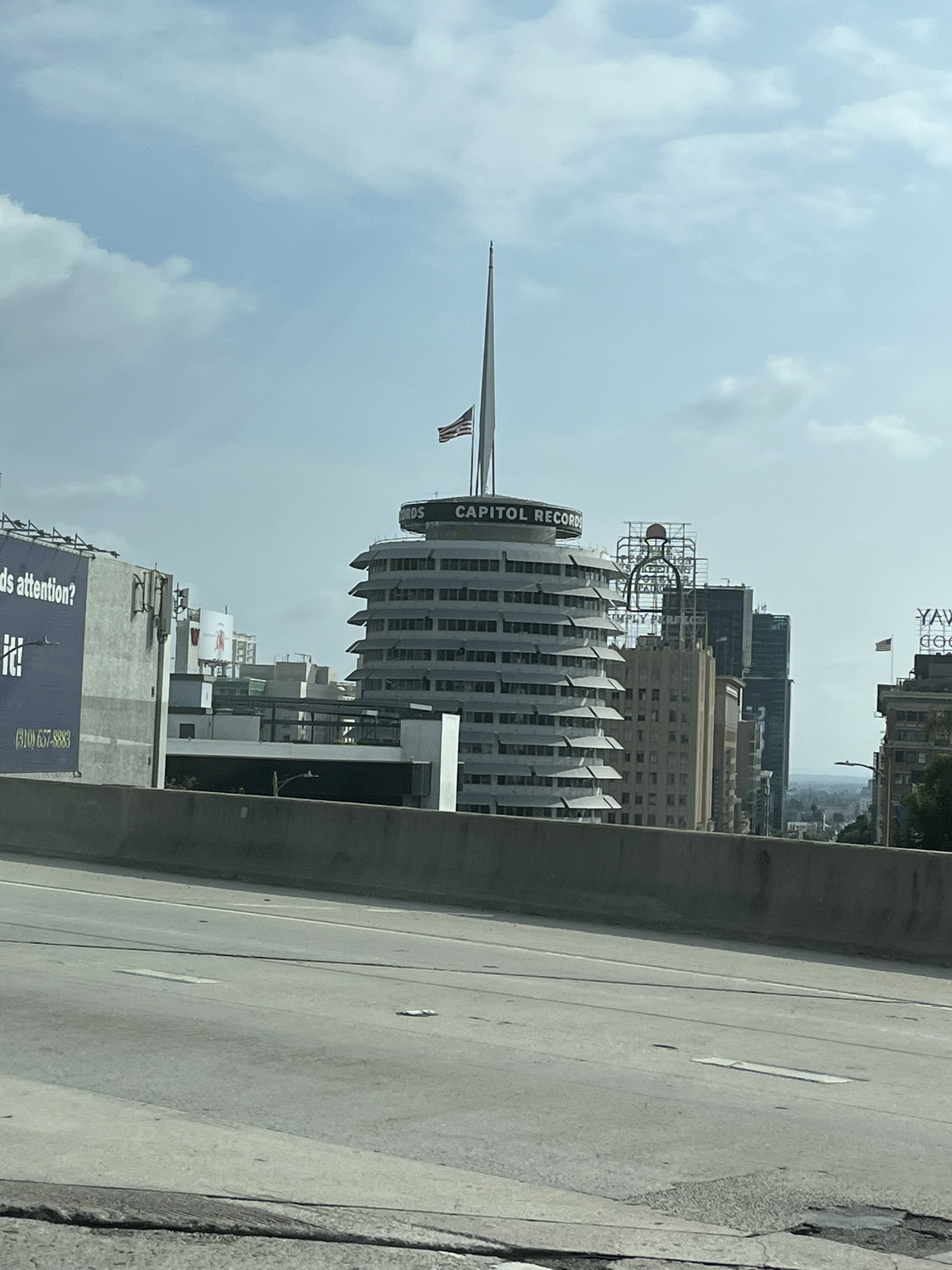
Viewed from the 101 Freeway

== In popular culture ==
- The 2009-2010 series Life After People has one episode feature the Capitol Records Building crumbling 175 years after humans vanish, although the echo chambers are shown to have survived the collapse.
- The 2005 video game Tony Hawk's American Wasteland features the Big Buck Building; players can skate down the building from the top to receive a giant needle for their skatepark.
- The 2013 video game Grand Theft Auto V features the Badger Building, based on the Capitol Records Building.
- The 1990 film The Adventures of Ford Fairlane features the building prominently in the climactic scene.
- The 2004 film The Day After Tomorrow features the building being torn apart by a tornado.
- The 2008 film Hancock, at the end of the first car chase, we see the superhero crashing a car on his antenna.

== See also ==
- List of Los Angeles Historic-Cultural Monuments in Hollywood
- National Register of Historic Places listings in Los Angeles
