= Louis Naidorf =

American architect and educator (1928–2025)

- Born: August 15, 1928; Los Angeles, California, U.S.
- Died: August 13, 2025 (aged 96); Santa Rosa, California, U.S.
- Education: University of California, Berkeley
- Occupation: Architect
- Practice: Independent / Collaboration with Welton Becket & Associates
- Projects: Capitol Records Building; Beverly Center; Santa Monica Civic Auditorium; Los Angeles Memorial Sports Arena; Century City
- Design: Mid-century modern, commercial and civic architecture

Louis Naidorf (August 15, 1928 – August 13, 2025) was an American architect and educator based in Los Angeles. He was known for designing the Capitol Records Building, the Beverly Center, the Santa Monica Civic Auditorium, and the Los Angeles Memorial Sports Arena, as well as contributing to the master planning of Century City. He also founded the architecture program at Woodbury University in Burbank, serving as its chairman.

== Background ==
Naidorf was born in Los Angeles, California, on August 15, 1928. He developed an interest in architecture at a young age. He attended the University of California, Berkeley, earning his undergraduate and graduate degrees.

Naidorf died on August 13, 2025, at the age of 96.

== Notable projects ==
- Capitol Records Building (Hollywood, 1956) – Iconic cylindrical tower, mid-century modern design, executed with Welton Becket & Associates.
- Santa Monica Civic Auditorium (Santa Monica, 1958) – Mid-century modern civic performance space.
- Los Angeles Memorial Sports Arena (Los Angeles, 1959) – Multi-purpose indoor arena, demolished in 2016.
- Century City (1960s–1970s) – Master planning of commercial district.
- Beverly Center (Los Angeles, early 1980s) – Elliptical shopping mall with central atrium and signature escalators.
- Woodbury University Architecture Program (Burbank) – Founded program and served as chairman.

== Selected projects ==
Year	Project	Location	Type	Notes
1956	Capitol Records Building	Hollywood, California	Commercial	Cylindrical tower, mid-century modern; executed with Welton Becket & Associates
1958	Santa Monica Civic Auditorium	Santa Monica	Civic	Mid-century modern performance space
1959	Los Angeles Memorial Sports Arena	Los Angeles	Civic / Sports	Multi-purpose indoor arena; demolished 2016
1960s–1970s	Century City	Los Angeles	Urban Planning	Master planning of commercial district
Early 1980s	Beverly Center	Los Angeles	Retail / Mall	Elliptical plan, central atrium, signature escalators
1970s–1980s	Woodbury University Architecture Program	Burbank	Education	Founded program and served as chairman
