= Cincinnati Hills Christian Academy =

Private school in Cincinnati, Ohio, United States

Location
- 8283 East Kemper Road; Cincinnati, Ohio 45249; United States; 39°16′36″N 84°20′11″W

Information
- Type: Private, Coeducational
- Religious affiliation: Non-denominational Christian
- Established: 1989
- Principal: Heather Wilkowski (Upper School), Steve Sideris (Upper Elementary), Sandy Breitholle (Preschool/Lower Elementary), Cammie Montgomery (Armleder Campus)
- Head of school: Dean Nicholas
- Grades: PK3–12
- Enrollment: 1300 (all grades)
- Campus: Suburban/Urban
- Colors: Purple and Black
- Athletics conference: Miami Valley Conference
- Nickname: Eagles
- Accreditation: NAIS, ISACS, OAIS, CESA
- Publication: The Eagles Eye
- Newspaper: The Talon
- Website: www.chca-oh.org

Cincinnati Hills Christian Academy (CHCA) is a private, pre-kindergarten through twelfth grade college preparatory, non-denominational Christian school located on four campuses in Cincinnati, Ohio. Three of its campuses (Edyth B. Lindner Campus, Founders' Campus, and Martha S. Lindner Campus) are located in northern Cincinnati, in Sycamore Township and Symmes Township, near the intersection of Interstate 71 and Interstate 275. The Otto Armleder Memorial Education Center is located in downtown Cincinnati.

== History ==
=== Overview ===
The school was founded in large part by Cincinnati businessman Carl Lindner, Jr., in 1989 on a 25-acre (100,000 m^{2}) plot of land. In its first year, it enrolled 165 students in pre-kindergarten through to seventh grade. It has since expanded to an early learning program for pre-kindergarten, a lower school for grades kindergarten preparatory through sixth grade, and a six-year college preparatory upper school, the only Protestant upper school in the city. The downtown campus is home to students from age three to the sixth grade. CHCA has an enrollment of approximately 1300 students in 2021. In 2025, CHCA refreshed its brand and refined the school seal.

=== Edyth B. Lindner Campus ===
The construction of the Edyth B. Lindner Elementary School adjacent to the original campus building took place in 1992. The elementary school originally housed preschool through to Grade 3. Today, this campus is now home to the Blake Lindner Thompson Early Childhood Learning Center for preschool students ages two to four, and the Lower School Grades kindergarten prep through third grade.

=== Founders' Campus ===
The original CHCA campus building is now home to CHCA's lower school's fourth through sixth grade upper elementary program, as well as upper school grades seven and eight, the first two years of the six-year upper school program.

=== Martha S. Lindner Campus ===
In 2001, this high school was constructed on a nearby 20-acre (81,000 m^{2}) plot of land. In 2008, a $3 million addition to the high school began. It was completed in January 2009. In 2016–2017, the school was expanded once more. It is home to CHCA's Upper School students in the ninth through twelfth grades.

=== Otto Armleder Memorial Education Center ===
The school system purchased the historic Crosley Square Building in downtown Cincinnati to establish a school for inner-city students from pre-kindergarten to sixth grade. In March 2006, Lindner announced a $16 million gift to the school, which would allow the Armleder Center to add seventh and eighth grades to its kindergarten through sixth grade offerings and would also fund scholarships for some Armleder students to continue their college-prep education through upper school in Symmes Township. The school is now home to students in preschool through to the sixth grade.

== Athletics ==
The Eagles are a member of the Miami Valley Conference.

=== OHSAA State Championships ===
- Boys' Baseball – 2021

=== Other Non-Sanctioned State Championships ===
- Girls Tennis - 1998, 1999, 2000, 2022

== Notable alumni ==
- Katie Reider, singer-songwriter
- Nicholas Petricca, lead singer of Walk the Moon
