= American Financial Group =

American insurance and investments company

American Financial Group, Inc.

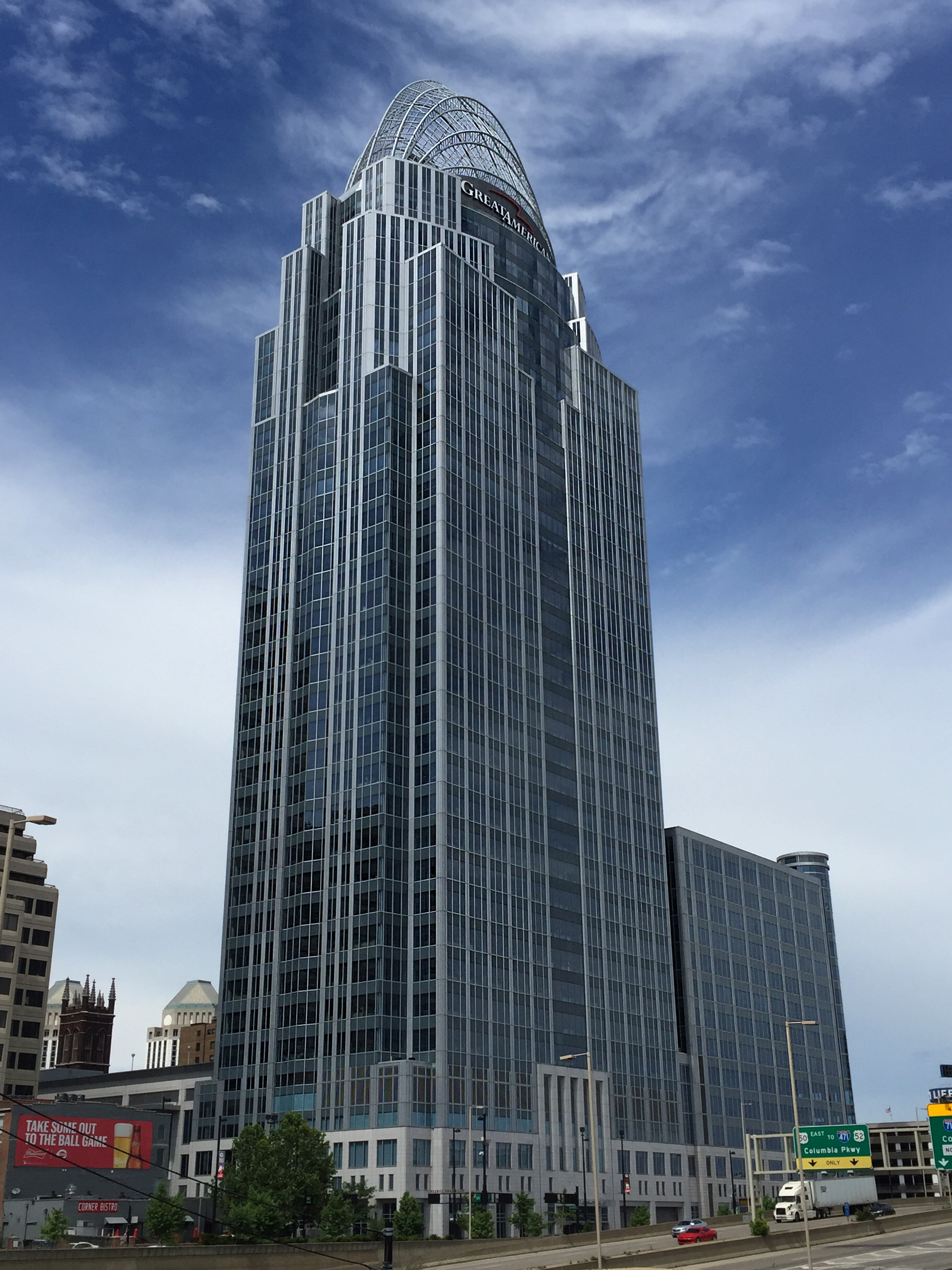
- Great American Tower at Queen City Square
- Trade name: American Financing
- Type: Public
- Traded as: NYSE: AFG; S&P 400 component
- Industry: Financial services
- Founded: 1872; 154 years ago
- Headquarters: Cincinnati, Ohio, U.S.
- Key people: Carl H. Lindner, founder S. Craig Lindner, co-CEO, co-president and director Carl H. Lindner III co-CEO, co-president and director
- Products: Insurance
- Revenue: ▼US$8.17 billion (2025)
- Net income: ▼US842 million (2025)
- Total assets: ▲US$32.64 billion (2025)
- Total equity: ▲US$4.82 billion (2025)
- Number of employees: ▲8,500 (2025)
- Website: afginc.com

American Financial Group, Inc. is an American financial services holding company headquartered in Cincinnati, Ohio. Its primary businesses are insurance and investments.

== Lines of business ==
American Financial Group's major insurance division operates as Great American Insurance, founded in 1872, and focuses on property and casualty insurance services. Other affiliates and subsidiaries include Great American Custom, Mid-Continent Group, National Interstate, and Republic Indemnity. Insurance specialties also include equine, trucking, executive liability, fidelity and crime, and agribusiness. Great American Financial Resources is a wholly owned subsidiary of American Financial Group and supplies a range of annuities, life insurance products and supplemental insurances to individuals and enterprises.

The parent company, AFG, is owned principally by the family of financier Carl Lindner, Jr., who bought the company in 1973 and served as its chairman until his death in 2011. The senior Lindner's sons, Carl H. Lindner III and S. Craig Lindner serve as co-chief executive officer.

== History ==
National General Corporation, run by Gene Klein, acquired Great American in 1968. Carl Lindner, Jr. later acquired National General, and then sold off its other operations.

By December 1988, the company had a flight department at Lunken Airport.

American Financial Group was ranked 486th on the Fortune 500 list in 2004. Through the years American Financial Group has owned a number of subsidiaries, real estate properties, and companies, including The Mountain View Grand Resort & Spa in Whitefield, New Hampshire, The Cincinnatian in Cincinnati, Ohio, The Biltmore in Coral Gables, Florida, Le Pavillon in New Orleans, Louisiana, and the Charleston Harbor Resort and Marina in Charleston, South Carolina. Great American Insurance Group partnered with the Cincinnati Reds baseball team to purchase naming rights for Great American Ball Park upon its opening in 2003.

On December 6, 2006, American Financial sold assets acquired from successors to the dissolution of the Penn Central Railroad including the land under Grand Central Terminal and the 156 miles (251 km) of Metro North track leading to the New York City landmark to Argent Ventures. The company announced in December 2007 that it would combine its offices and move its headquarters to the brand new Great American Insurance Building at Queen City Square in 2011.

American Financial Group was one of the first publicly traded Fortune 500 companies to make political donations after corporations' freedom of speech rights were expanded to include donations as a result of the Citizens United v. FEC decision. Carl Lindner, Jr is a longtime top Republican donor, donating millions of his personal income to candidates and political action committees, which sent ripples in campaign finance circles during the 2010 mid-term elections. American Financial, of which Lindner has a non-majority 42% share, donated $400,000 to the Republican-allied PAC American Crossroads.

== See also ==
- List of S&P 400 companies
