= Bob Castellini =

American businessman and baseball franchise owner

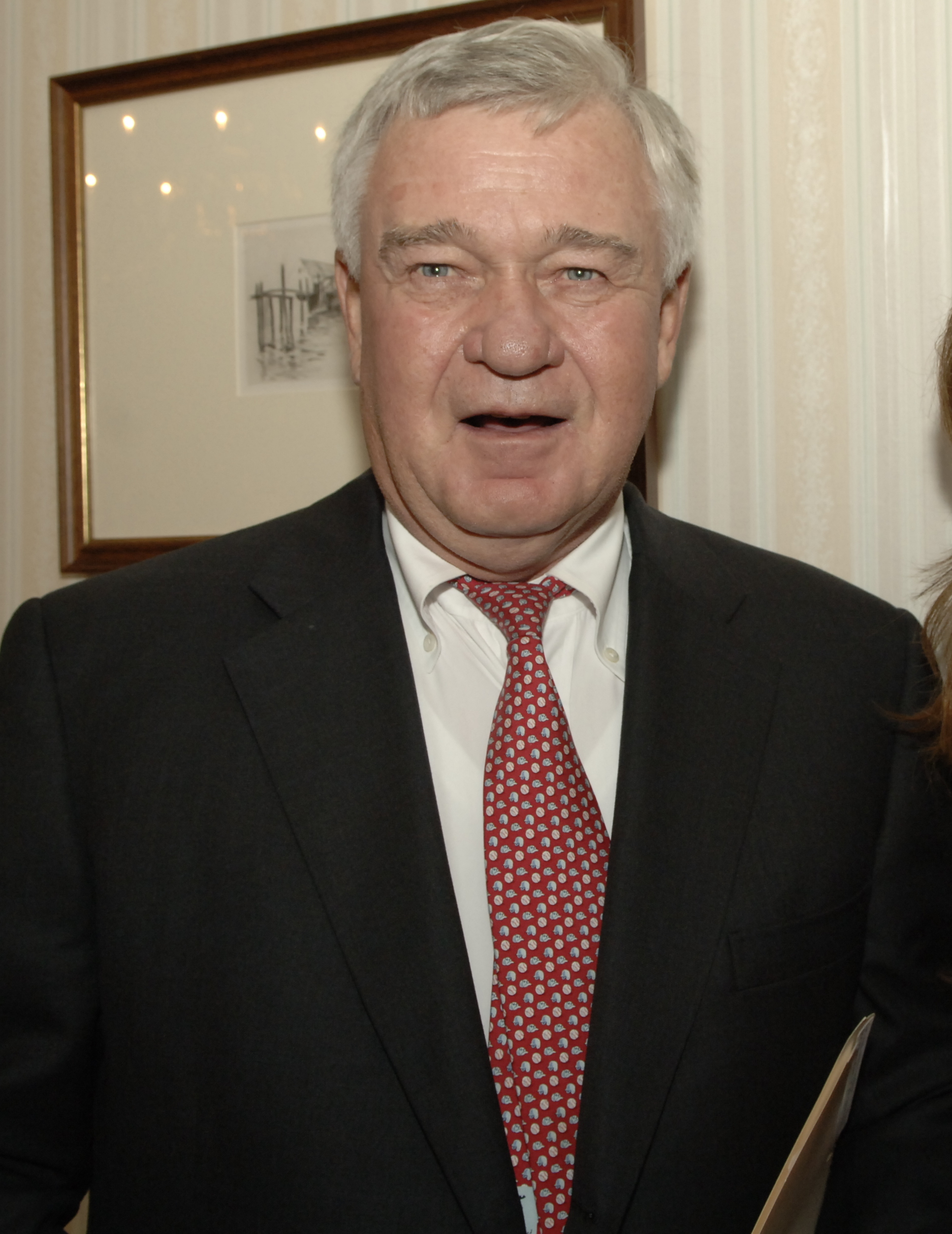
- Castellini in 2007
- Born: September 23, 1941 (age 84); Cincinnati, Ohio, U.S.
- Education: Georgetown; Wharton School
- Occupations: Chairman of Castellini Company; Managing general partner of the Cincinnati Reds (2006–present)
- Website: Official website

Robert Castellini (born September 23, 1941) is an American businessman from Cincinnati, Ohio. From 2006 to 2026, he was principal owner and managing general partner of the Cincinnati Reds, leading a group that purchased a majority share of the Major League Baseball (MLB) franchise from previous CEO Carl Lindner, Jr. Castellini is the chairman of Castellini Co., a fruit and vegetable wholesaler. His son, Phil Castellini, now takes his spot.

== Background ==
Robert Castellini was born on September 23, 1941, in Cincinnati, Ohio.

Castellini earned a degree in economics from Georgetown University in 1963. He went on to earn his MBA from Wharton School in 1967. After graduating from Wharton, Castellini became executive vice-president at the Castellini Group of Companies, and then in 1970 became president of the company until 1992. He had been a part of the St. Louis Cardinals' ownership group and had previously invested in the Baltimore Orioles.

In January 2006, Castellini was the head of a group who purchased the Cincinnati Reds baseball team. Castellini has been involved in baseball for over 30 years and once had a minor ownership stake in the Reds until it was sold in 1984. In 1989 he became a partner in the Texas Rangers and in 1993, the Baltimore Orioles. Castellini describes himself as a lifelong fan of the Cincinnati Reds.

== Ownership of the Reds ==
After the 2005 season, the Reds had endured five consecutive losing seasons, the team's longest such streak in 50 years, under the ownership of Carl Lindner. Castellini led a group that purchased the Reds from Lindner for $270 million, and in January 2006, Castellini was named the CEO of the franchise. One of Castellini's first moves as CEO was replacing General Manager Dan O'Brien with Wayne Krivsky in February 2006. The Reds were more competitive in 2006, finishing in 3rd place in the National League (NL) Central division at 80–82. In the winter of 2006, Castellini introduced new uniforms for the Reds. Under Castellini's ownership in 2010, the Cincinnati Reds won their first National League Central division championship since the 1995 season. From 2014 to 2019 they finished no higher than 4th place in the Central division including 4 straight seasons in last place, losing more than 90 games each season. In 2020 they made the playoffs in the COVID-19-shortened season with an expanded playoff field but were beaten by the Atlanta Braves, 2–0.

Despite telling Reds' fans "We're buying the Reds to win. Anything else is unacceptable, " the Reds have the 22nd most wins during his ownership (record: 1,193–1,297), five winning seasons (tied for 22nd in the league), and are one of only seven teams to fail to make their league's championship series.

Following the end of the 2022 MLB lockout, the Reds went on an apparent fire sale, leading to several fan protests over Castellini's ownership of the team and asking him to sell. The Reds season started badly as their record stood at 3-22 through their first 25 games of the 2022 season.

Castellini's son, Phil, worked as the team's Senior Director of Business Operations. Following the 2007 season, he was named the team's chief operating officer. In July 2024, Bob handed his posts as president and CEO to Phil, though Bob remains head of the franchise.
