= Taft Broadcasting =

American media conglomerate (1939–1999)

Taft Broadcasting Company
- Formerly: Radio Cincinnati, Inc. (1939–1959)
- Type: Subsidiary (1939–1959); Corporation (1959–1999)
- Industry: Television and Radio network
- Founded: 1939; 87 years ago
- Defunct: 1999; 27 years ago
- Fate: Acquired by Clear Channel Communications
- Successors: Radio: iHeartMedia
- Headquarters: Cincinnati, Ohio, United States

Taft Broadcasting Company (also known as Taft Television and Radio Company, Incorporated) was an American media conglomerate based in Cincinnati, Ohio.

The company was rooted in the family of William Howard Taft, the 27th President of the United States. In 1879, William Howard's brother, Charles Phelps Taft, purchased two afternoon newspapers in Cincinnati, The Times and The Cincinnati Daily Star, merging them into the Cincinnati Times-Star in 1880. It was during the tenure of the merged paper's second publisher, Hulbert Taft Sr., son of Charles and William Howard's half-brother, Peter Rawson Taft II, that the newspaper also became involved in broadcasting.

The company was the owner of such major media and entertainment properties as Hanna-Barbera Productions, Hanna-Barbera Pty, Ltd./Taft-Hardie Group Pty. Ltd., Worldvision Enterprises, Ruby-Spears Productions, KECO Entertainment and many television and radio stations. It also owned 50% of CIC Video's Australian operations, CIC-Taft Home Video.

The company went through a long reorganization period starting in 1987 with its acquisition by Carl Lindner, Jr. and renamed Great American Broadcasting. Shortly after filing for bankruptcy in 1993, it became Citicasters and was, in 1999, acquired by Clear Channel Communications, which was renamed iHeartMedia in 2014. Taft — as Citicasters — remained incorporated as a holding company within iHeartMedia until 2020.

== History ==
=== 1939–1959 ===
The Taft family's involvement in broadcasting began in 1939, when the Cincinnati Times-Star purchased WKRC radio from CBS. The paper formed Radio Cincinnati, Inc. as a subsidiary to operate the station.

In April 1949, Taft's first TV station, WKRC-TV in Cincinnati, began broadcasting.

In 1951, in its first expansion outside Ohio, Radio Cincinnati acquired a 20 percent interest in WBIR-AM-FM in Knoxville, Tennessee from father-and-son owners J. Lindsay and Gilmore Nunn. A year-and-a-half later, the Taft family increased its stake to 30 percent when the Nunns sold additional shares in that station to Martha and Robert Ashe, John P. Hart, and Radio Cincinnati.

In 1953, Radio Cincinnati purchased WTVN-TV (now WSYX) in Columbus, Ohio, from Picture-Waves, Inc., controlled by Toledo attorney and broadcaster Edward Lamb.

In 1954, the company bought WHKC radio in Columbus from United Broadcasting, then-owners of WHK in Cleveland; WHKC is renamed WTVN.

In August 1956, WBIR-TV in Knoxville began broadcasting, under the same ownership structure as the WBIR radio stations.

In 1957, Radio Cincinnati purchased WBRC-AM-FM-TV in Birmingham, Alabama, from Storer Broadcasting.

In 1958, the Cincinnati Times-Star was merged into the Cincinnati Post, published by the E.W. Scripps Company. Radio Cincinnati also purchased WKXP-TV in Lexington, Kentucky, from local interests and changed its call letters to WKYT-TV.

In 1959, the company acquired the remaining 70 percent of WBIR-AM-FM-TV in Knoxville. Also in 1959, the Taft family merged its broadcasting subsidiaries into one, using the Taft Broadcasting Company name. Subsidiaries WBRC, Inc. (WBRC-AM-FM-TV), WTVN, Inc. (WTVN-TV), Radio Cincinnati, Inc. (WKRC-AM-FM-TV and WKYT-TV), and Radio Columbus, Inc. (WTVN-AM-FM) were merged on June 23, 1959 and WBIR, Inc. (WBIR-AM-FM-TV) was merged on February 1, 1960.

=== 1960–1979 ===
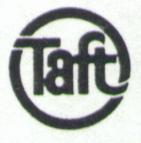
Logo used from 1959 to 1974.

In 1960, Taft launched WTVN-FM in Columbus (it is now WLVQ). A year later the company sold the WBIR stations in Knoxville to Multimedia Inc. of Greenville, South Carolina.

In 1961, Taft signed a group affiliation deal with ABC, converting all of the stations Taft had owned at that time, to the network. With WTVN-TV already an ABC affiliate, WBRC-TV, WKYT, and WKRC-TV switched to the network. This came after that network's founder Leonard Goldenson persuaded Taft president Hulbert Taft Jr., a longtime friend, to switch several of the company's stations to ABC.

In 1963, Taft purchased several stations from Transcontinent Television Corporation: WDAF-AM-FM-TV in Kansas City, Missouri, WGR-AM-FM-TV in Buffalo, New York, and WNEP-TV in Scranton, Pennsylvania. The sale was completed on April 1, 1964.

In October 1966, Taft purchased the Hanna-Barbera cartoon studio from its founders, Joseph Barbera, William Hanna and George Sidney. Several months later in April 1967, the firm sold WKYT-TV to a subsidiary of Kentucky Central Life Insurance Company.

On November 10, 1967, Taft Broadcasting president and chairman Hulbert Taft Jr. died in liquid propane gas-related explosion in a bomb shelter he had built on his property in the Cincinnati suburb of Indian Hill. Days after his death, his son Dudley S. Taft replaced him on the firm's board of directors, and he eventually became head of the company.

In 1969, Taft purchased WIBF-TV in Philadelphia and changed its call letters to WTAF-TV. The FCC initially granted Taft a waiver to keep both WTAF-TV and WNEP-TV, but later reversed itself in 1973 (four years later), and Taft sold the Scranton outlet to the station's management, who formed NEP Communications. Also that year, the broadcasting group formed The Sy Fischer Company to produce television programming.

In 1970, Taft formed Rhodes Productions, a television syndication arm for various independent TV programs, including those of Hanna-Barbera.

In 1972, Taft opened its first theme park, Kings Island, outside of Cincinnati. Taft owned five other theme parks through its KECO Entertainment division. WBRC radio and WBRC-FM in Birmingham are sold to Mooney Broadcasting. Taft's Rhodes Productions subsidiary has hired John Pearson International as international backer of its programming.

In 1973, Taft sold WNEP-TV in Scranton to its management, called NEP Communications.

In 1974, Taft acquired Top 40 station KQV and rock outlet WDVE, both in Pittsburgh, from ABC Radio.

In 1975, a second theme park based on Kings Island, Kings Dominion, opened outside of Richmond. Rhodes Productions was renamed to Taft, H-B Program Sales while Taft, H-B International was established as the new overseas television distribution arm for the company. Rhodes was eventually revived two weeks later under Filmways. Carowinds in Charlotte, North Carolina was acquired by the company in 1975 from the Carowinds Corporation.

In 1979, Taft purchased WDCA-TV in Washington, D.C. from the Superior Tube Company. Around this same period, Taft also acquired independent distributor Worldvision Enterprises (formerly a division of ABC) and production company QM Productions.

=== 1980–1987 ===
In 1980, Taft acquired Sunn Classic Pictures and two additional Schick divisions. Sunn Classic was reincorporated as Taft International Pictures. In 1981, two Taft executives launched Jensen Farley Pictures to purchase the company's distribution assets, while in 1982, Taft had reinstated the Sunn Classic Pictures name as a unit in order to produce TV movies and miniseries.

In 1981, Taft acquired Ruby-Spears Productions from Filmways. Around this time, in the early 1980s, Taft split its operation into two "subdivisions": the "Taft Entertainment Company" (which included Hanna-Barbera, Ruby-Spears, Worldvision, the theme parks, Taft International Pictures, and Taft Entertainment Television), which was headed by Sy Fischer. The other was the "Taft Television & Radio Co, Inc.". Also in 1981, Taft, in partnership with The Great-West Life Assurance Company of Winnipeg, opened Canada's Wonderland, a theme park near Toronto. Taft also bought television producer Titus Productions, run by Herbert Brodkin later that year as part of the Taft Entertainment Company.

In 1982, KQV in Pittsburgh was sold to its general manager Robert W. Dickey and newspaper publisher Richard Mellon Scaife, under the "Calvary, Inc." banner.

In 1983, Taft exchanged WGR-TV in Buffalo to General Cinema Corporation's Coral Television subsidiary in return for WCIX in Miami. In 1984, the Taft Entertainment Company was reorganized, in order to set up various theatrical projects that was made by the studio, such as On Wings with Eagles. Also that year, it formed a partnership with Keith Barish to start out a joint venture, with a worldwide distribution alliance at 20th Century Fox to distribute the films. During that year, Taft decided to rename the former QM Productions unit as Taft Entertainment Television, with The Lucie Arnaz Show being the first show to be produced under that name.

On August 20, 1986, Taft/Barish Productions, the feature film joint venture between the broadcasting group and Keith Barish Productions had inked a ten-picture distribution deal with Tri-Star Pictures for $200 million, to handle domestic distribution of the films at a rate of four to six films per year.

In 1985, Taft purchased Gulf Broadcasting, which included KTXA in Fort Worth; KTXH in Houston; WTSP in St. Petersburg, Florida; KTSP-TV (now KSAZ-TV) in Phoenix; KESQ-TV in Palm Springs, California; and WGHP in High Point, North Carolina. As a result, Taft sold several radio stations to CBS to comply with FCC rules. KESQ-TV was spun off to former Gulf Broadcasting executive E. Grant Fitts. In October 1986, WTAF-TV in Philadelphia and WCIX in Miami became charter affiliates of the Fox Broadcasting Company. One month later, Taft announced the sale of both of those stations along with its three independent stations (WDCA-TV, KTXA, and KTXH) to the TVX Broadcast Group; the sale was completed in April 1987. Taft also sold WGR radio and WRLT-FM (the former WGR-FM) in Buffalo to Rich Communications, a subsidiary of Buffalo-based Rich Products. In 1987, Taft, wanting to purchase more network-affiliated television stations, is looking to sell Taft Entertainment Group, the entertainment subsidiary of the Taft Broadcasting company to a different buyer, with estimates cost $300 million, and the group had a record production year in 1986 out of 334 animated half hours and 63 live-action half hour programs, to the three networks, to the cable networks, to first-run syndication.

Taft Broadcasting Company was purchased by TFBA Limited Partnership, which included Robert M. Bass as a partner, in April 1987 for $1.43 billion, taking the company private.

=== Successor companies ===
Later in 1987, Cincinnati-based businessman Carl Lindner, Jr. staged a hostile takeover and acquired controlling interest in Taft Broadcasting. Lindner renamed the company Great American Broadcasting (also known as Great American Communications) following a major restructuring of its operations. The new name came from Linder's insurance company, Great American Insurance.

Since Taft Broadcasting was legally dissolved and replaced by Great American, the FCC considered this restructuring to be an ownership change. It ordered Great American to sell either WTVN-TV or WKRC-TV. The Cincinnati station provided at least secondary coverage to the Columbus area, and the common ownership had been "grandfathered" when the FCC enacted its "one to a market" rule in the 1970s. With the restructuring, however, they lost this protection. As a result, Great American spun off WTVN-TV to Anchor Media, a new firm composed of former Taft Broadcasting board members led by Robert Bass. (The two stations have since been reunited under the Sinclair Broadcast Group, with cross-ownership rules having since been relaxed.) Another new company, led by former Taft Broadcasting president Dudley S. Taft Sr., took the Taft Broadcasting name. This new company retained WGHP and later purchases another Philadelphia station, WPHL-TV.

In 1988, Great American Broadcasting sold Worldvision to Aaron Spelling Productions. Included with Worldvision were outright ownership of all of Great American's programming assets (including the remnants of Taft International Pictures and Taft Entertainment Television), except for the Hanna-Barbera and Ruby-Spears libraries, which remained owned by Great American for the time being. However, Worldvision continued to hold syndication rights until the two animation studios found new owners.

In 1991, Hanna-Barbera, along with much of the original Ruby-Spears library, was acquired by Turner Broadcasting System, which became part of Time Warner in 1996. As part of this deal, syndication rights to the libraries were passed to Turner Program Services (via Turner Entertainment Co.) prior to Time Warner's purchase of Turner. Eventually, TPS was folded into Warner Bros. Television Distribution. The Ruby-Spears studio was spun off and bought back by Joe Ruby and Ken Spears, and operated as an independent operation from then forward.

In 1992, KECO Entertainment, Great American's theme park division, was sold to Paramount Communications (the parent of Paramount Pictures; the parent company was formerly known as Gulf+Western) and became Paramount Parks, later to be acquired by Viacom. (These parks were sold to Cedar Fair Entertainment Co. by CBS in 2006.) Great American also reacquired WGHP from Dudley Taft.

In 1993, Great American filed for Chapter 11 bankruptcy and renamed to Citicasters Communications in 1994. It also sold WKRC radio to Jacor and shut down Electra, a teletext service operated as a joint venture between Taft, Zenith, and Turner Broadcasting's WTBS (now WPCH-TV) in Atlanta.

In 1994, Citicasters sold most of its TV stations, including WDAF-TV and KSAZ-TV to New World Communications, and WBRC and WGHP to the News Corporation's Fox Television Stations unit, which would later acquire the New World chain. Around the same time, when two of the markets switched to ABC via Scripps, Citicasters agreed to a two-station deal with CBS to affiliate with WTSP and WKRC.

In 1996, Citicasters, by then the owner of two television stations, five AM radio stations and 14 FM radio stations, merged with Jacor, which became a subsidiary of Citicasters. Three months after the merger was completed, Jacor exchanged WTSP to Gannett in return for Gannett's radio stations in Los Angeles, San Diego and Tampa. In 1997, as a condition of the merger, Jacor sold WKRQ and the original WDAF-FM (by then KYYS, now KCKC) to American Radio Systems, which would become acquired by Infinity Broadcasting (later renamed CBS Radio) in 1998. Also in 1997, Jacor sold WDAF (AM) (now KCSP) to Entercom.

In 1997, the Worldvision properties that had previously been under Taft and Great American (with the exception of the Hanna-Barbera and most of the pre-1991 Ruby-Spears properties) were incorporated into Republic Pictures (today part of CBS Studios).

In 1999, Clear Channel Communications acquired Citicasters and Jacor. The Citicasters name lived on as a holding company and licensee under the Clear Channel corporate structure until 2020, when the Citicasters and Jacor names were eliminated as part of a reorganization of iHeartMedia's subsidiaries.

== Former stations ==
- Stations are arranged in alphabetical order by state and city of license.
- Two boldface asterisks appearing following a station's call letters (**) indicate a station built and signed on by Taft.

Media market	State/District	Station	Purchased	Sold	Notes
Birmingham	Alabama	WBRC	1957	1972	
Birmingham	Alabama	WBRC-FM	1957	1972	
Birmingham	Alabama	WBRC-TV	1957	1994	
Phoenix	Arizona	KTSP-TV	1985	1994	
Washington, D.C.	District of Columbia	WDCA-TV	1979	1987	
Miami–Fort Lauderdale	Florida	WCIX	1983	1987	
St. Petersburg–Tampa	Florida	WTSP	1985	1994	
Lexington	Kentucky	WKYT-TV	1958	1967	
Kansas City	Missouri	WDAF	1964	1987	
Kansas City	Missouri	WDAF-FM	1964	1987	
Kansas City	Missouri	WDAF-TV	1964	1994	
Buffalo	New York	WGR	1964	1987	
Buffalo	New York	WGR-FM	1964	1987	
Buffalo	New York	WGR-TV	1964	1983	
High Point–Greensboro–Winston-Salem	North Carolina	WGHP	1985	1994	
Cincinnati	Ohio	WKRC	1939	1987	
Cincinnati	Ohio	WKRC-FM **	1947	1987	
Cincinnati	Ohio	WKRC-TV **	1949	1995	
Columbus	Ohio	WTVN	1954	1987	
Columbus	Ohio	WTVN-FM **	1960	1987	
Columbus	Ohio	WTVN-TV	1953	1987	
Pittsburgh	Pennsylvania	KQV	1974	1982	
Pittsburgh	Pennsylvania	WDVE	1974	1987	
Philadelphia	Pennsylvania	WTAF-TV	1969	1987	
Philadelphia	Pennsylvania	WPHL-TV	1987	1992	
Scranton–Wilkes-Barre	Pennsylvania	WNEP-TV	1964	1973	
Knoxville	Tennessee	WBIR	1959	1961	(Note: Taft held a 20 percent interest in this station from 1951 to 1953. The stake was increased to 30 percent from 1953 to 1959.)
Knoxville	Tennessee	WBIR-FM	1959	1961	
Knoxville	Tennessee	WBIR-TV	1959	1961	(Note: Taft held a 30 percent interest in WBIR-TV between 1956 and 1959.)
Fort Worth–Dallas	Texas	KTXA	1985	1987	
Houston	Texas	KTXH	1985	1987	
