= E. A. Bushnell =

American cartoonist (1872–1939)

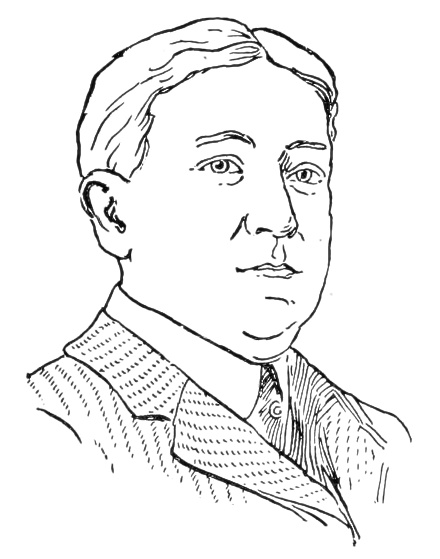
- Born: Elmer Andrews Bushnell; July 30, 1872; Bloomfield Township, Trumbull County, Ohio, US
- Died: January 27, 1939 (aged 66); Cincinnati, Ohio, US
- Occupation: Cartoonist

Elmer Andrews Bushnell (July 30, 1872 - January 27, 1939) was an American cartoonist, known for his political cartoons. Historians Alan Marcus and Zane Miller have credited Bushnell with a part in the downfall of George B. Cox.

== Biography ==
He was born on July 30, 1872, in Bloomfield Township, Trumbull County, Ohio, to Wells Andrews Bushnell and Emma Jane Bliss. He married Alice Mead Wicks on April 26, 1899, in Cuyahoga County, Ohio. They then moved to Cincinnati.

He first worked for the Cincinnati Post for several years, before working for the Cincinnati Times-Star. He then joined a newspaper syndicate. He also worked for the New York Globe and the New York Journal.

He died on January 27, 1939, in Cincinnati.
