= Earl Lawson =

Earl Lawson may refer to:

- Earl Lawson (politician) (1891–1950), Canadian politician
- Earl Lawson (sportswriter) (1923–2003), American sportswriter
