= Thomas C. Campbell =

American politician

Thomas (T. C.) Campbell
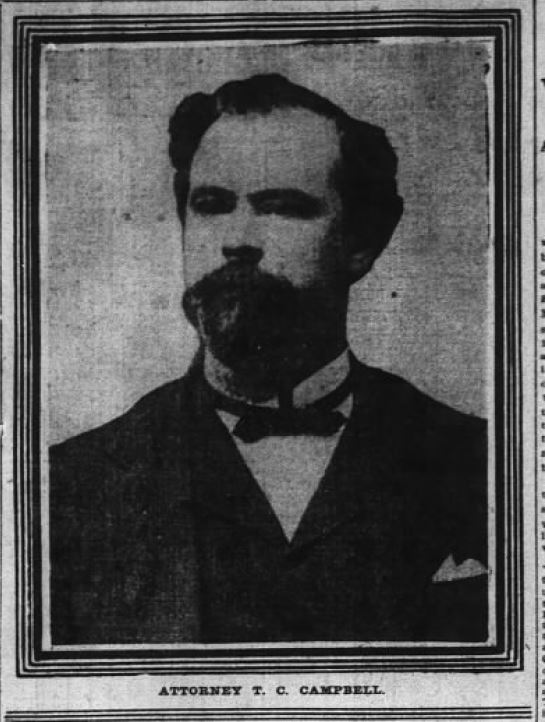
- from Cincinnati Enquirer, January 5, 1904
- Born: August 10, 1845; Rochester, New York
- Died: January 4, 1904; Brooklyn, New York

Thomas C. Campbell (April 25, 1845 – January 4, 1904), also known as T. C. Campbell, was an American lawyer and Republican political boss of Cincinnati, Ohio.

== Biography ==
Campbell was born on April 25, 1845, in Rochester, New York, to Scottish American parents. On his sixteenth birthday, at the outbreak of the American Civil War, he enlisted in the Union Army and rose to the rank of colonel. He was honorably discharged in the fall of 1865.

After leaving the army, Campbell moved to Cincinnati, Ohio, where he worked as a bookkeeper while studying law at the Cincinnati Law School. In 1867, he was elected quartermaster general of the Grand Army of the Republic and appointed editor of its official organ, The Republic. He was elected to City Council in 1868 and the following year was appointed Assistant Collector of Internal Revenue of the Cincinnati district.

In March 1870, Campbell completed his studies and began practicing law in the city. The next year, he was elected prosecuting attorney. During his two terms as prosecutor, his successes included prosecutions for electoral fraud, a defense of the police chief in a friendly fire incident, and the prosecution of the city controller for illegally reissuing bonds. Campbell was retained for ten years by the Cincinnati Commercial Tribune and Cincinnati Enquirer.

In the 1870s and 1880s, Campbell had a reputation for jury fixing and was blamed for much of the corruption in the Hamilton County court system. With his protégé, George B. Cox, he controlled much of city government. They were supported by The Cincinnati Enquirer and its Democratic publisher John R. McLean. In 1883, The Cincinnati Post launched a series of attacks against Campbell. Campbell responded by suing the paper for libel in front of a partially fixed jury. Amid threats from the Cox machine, the Post hired bodyguards for its editors and managers. In 1884, Campbell founded the Cincinnati Telegram, a daily afternoon newspaper, mainly for the purpose of lampooning Post editors. After one of Campbell's juries triggered the Courthouse riots of 1884, one of the most destructive riots in American history, prominent attorneys including William Howard Taft began disbarment proceedings against Campbell. He was only temporarily disbarred, but the episode ended his influence. Cox would later take Campbell's place as head of the city's Republican machine.

In 1888, Campbell moved from his College Hill home to New York City. The next year, the Post put the Telegram out of business by secretly financing its unsuccessful move to morning publication. Campbell continued practicing law both in New York and in Ohio. He was twice nominated to run for Congress but declined both times. He became active in New York politics, turning a reliable Tammany Hall district into a Republican stronghold and helping to send his law partner John Ford to the state senate.

On January 3, 1904, Campbell arrived in New York harbor, having fallen ill aboard the yacht Roamer when it went ashore at Rum Cay in the Bahamas. He died in his sleep the next day in Brooklyn.
