= Frederick Burns =

Frederick Burns may refer to:

- Frederick William Burns, American sports announcer
- J. Frederick Burns, American politician from Maine
- Fred Burns (tennis) (Frederick D. Burns), American sportswriter, and tennis commentator and player
- Fred Burns (sprinter), winner of the 300 yards at the 1913 USA Indoor Track and Field Championships

== See also ==
- Fred Burns (actor), American actor
- Freddie Burns, English rugby union player
