= The Cincinnati Times-Star =

Defunct American newspaper

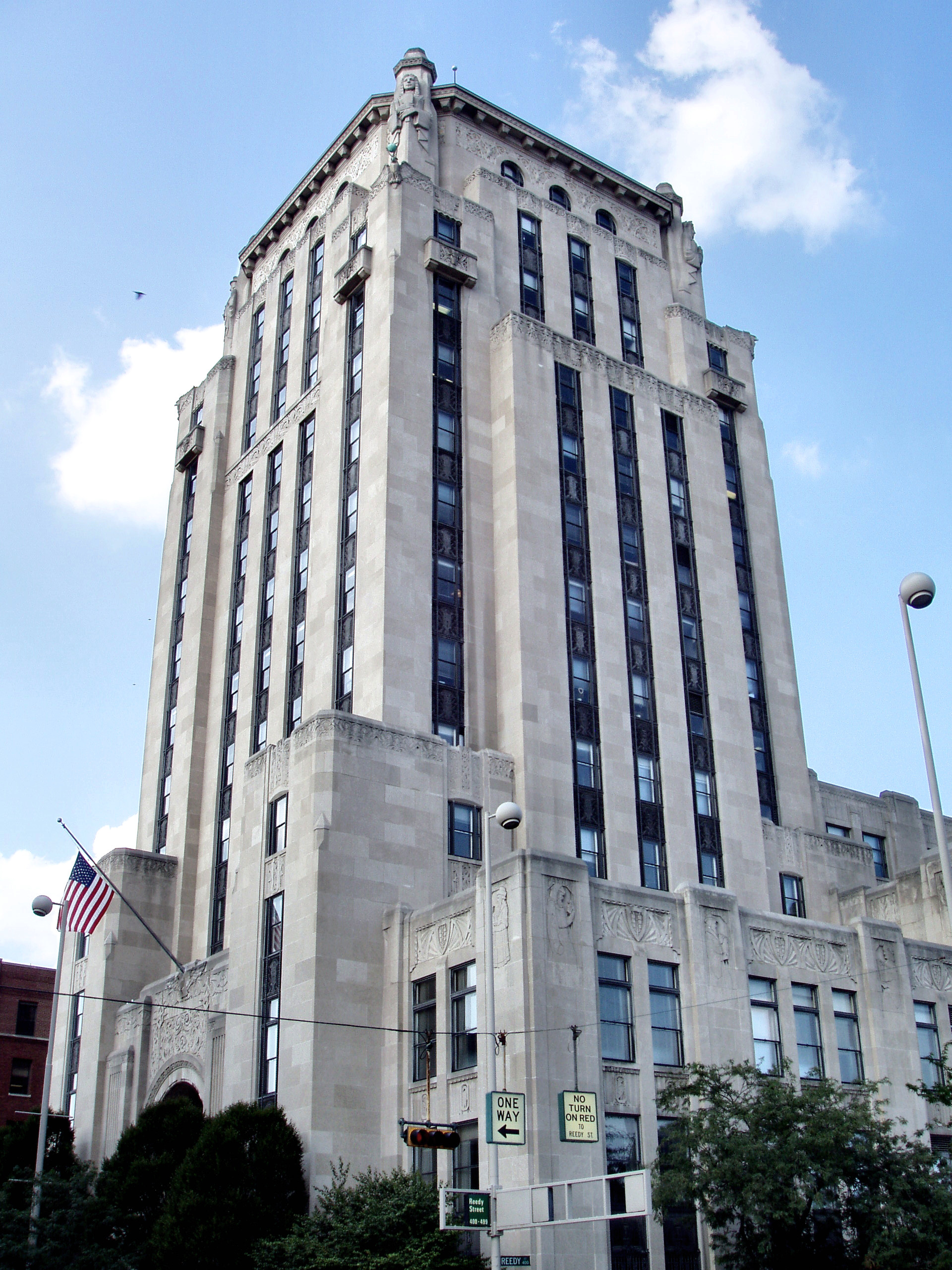
- The Cincinnati Times-Star Building
- Type: Defunct
- Format: Broadsheet
- Owner: Taft family
- Editor: Charles Phelps Taft; Hulbert Taft, Sr.
- Founded: June 15, 1880
- Ceased publication: August 3, 1958
- Language: English
- Headquarters: Cincinnati Times-Star Building; Cincinnati, Ohio
- City: Cincinnati, Ohio
- Country: United States
- OCLC number: 17937796

The Cincinnati Times-Star was an afternoon daily newspaper in Cincinnati, Ohio, United States, from 1880 to 1958. The Northern Kentucky edition was known as The Kentucky Times-Star, and a Sunday edition was known as The Sunday Times-Star. The Times-Star was owned by the Taft family and originally edited by Charles Phelps Taft, then, by his nephew, Hulbert Taft, Sr. The Taft family's investments in news media would later grow into Taft Broadcasting, a conglomerate that owned radio, television, and entertainment properties nationwide.

== History ==
The Star of January 2, 1875

The Times-Star first published on June 15, 1880, after the merger of The Times (founded April 25, 1840, as Spirit of the Times) and The Cincinnati Daily Star (founded in 1872 as The Evening Star). Charles Phelps Taft had purchased both papers the previous year, and named his brother, Peter Rawson Taft II, publisher.

The Times-Star strongly supported political boss George B. Cox, to the embarrassment of Charles Phelps Taft's half-brother, progressive reformer and future President William Howard Taft.

On November 23, 1895, the Times-Star ran an editorial proposing a contest to choose a flag for the City of Cincinnati, offering a $50 prize. On January 24, 1896, the commission awarded the $50 to influential illustrator Emil Rothengatter for the design that is in use today.

The newspaper's offices were originally located on Sixth and Walnut streets. On January 1, 1933, the Times-Star moved into the 16-story Cincinnati Times-Star Building on Broadway.

In 1939, the Times-Star purchased WKRC radio from CBS and subsequently became an affiliate and shareholder of the Mutual Broadcasting System through subsidiary Radio Cincinnati.

In 1952, Hulbert Taft, Sr., owner and publisher of the Times-Star, attempted to acquire The Cincinnati Enquirer from its owner, a Washington D.C.–based trust. A bidding war ensued when Enquirer employees pooled their assets in order to make a counter offer. The offer was accepted by the trust, and the attempted acquisition was unsuccessful.

On August 3, 1958, the Times-Star was sold to Scripps-Howard Newspapers, owners of The Cincinnati Post, which by then had also purchased the Enquirer. Hulbert Taft Sr. was reportedly the only family member who opposed the sale. Radio Cincinnati was reorganized as Taft Broadcasting. The Post moved into the Times-Star Building and published under the name The Cincinnati Post and Times-Star until December 31, 1974, when it reverted to The Cincinnati Post.

== Notable former employees ==
- Edith Evans Asbury – reporter for The New York Times
- Fred Burns – tennis commentator
- E. A. Bushnell – political cartoonist
- George Elliston – journalist
- James W. Faulkner – political journalist
- Haven Gillespie – typesetter; later a composer and lyricist
- James Isaminger – sportswriter
- Earl Lawson – sportswriter
- Mayo Mohs – author
- Charles Murphy – sportswriter; later owner of the Chicago Cubs
- Raymond Gram Swing – radio commentator

== Publishers ==
- Peter Rawson Taft II
- Hulbert Taft Sr.
- Hulbert Taft Jr.
- David Sinton Ingalls

== See also ==
- Cincinnati Times-Star Building
