= Mastering the Universe =

2005 book by Roger Sweet and David Wecker

Mastering the Universe: He-Man and the Rise and Fall of a Billion-Dollar Idea
- Authors: Roger Sweet; David Wecker
- Language: English
- Publisher: Emmis Books
- Publication date: July 11, 2005
- Publication place: United States
- Media type: Print (Paperback)
- Pages: 240 pages
- ISBN: 1-57860-223-8
- OCLC: 59712548
- Dewey Decimal: 688.7/2 22
- LC Class: NK4894.3.H46 S94 2005

Mastering the Universe: He-Man and the Rise and Fall of a Billion-Dollar Idea is a 2005 autobiographical book by Roger Sweet and David Wecker that recounts Sweet's work behind the scenes of the corporate culture of the 1980s American toy industry.

== Description ==
Sweet (with his co-author and nephew David Wecker) details the creation of the Masters of the Universe toy line, its rise to immense popularity and then dizzying crash in which profits fell from a peak of $400 million in United States sales alone in 1986 to a mere $7 million in 1987. The book is primarily a view of the corporate side of creating Masters of the Universe, but details very little of the conceptual process behind inventing the individual Masters of the Universe characters and products.
