= Tim Heald =

Tim Villiers Heald FRSL (28 January 1944 – 20 November 2016) was a British author, biographer, journalist and public speaker.

== Life and writings ==
Heald was born in Dorchester, Dorset, England, and educated at Sherborne School, Dorset, and Balliol College, Oxford, gaining an MA in Modern History in 1965.

He wrote over 30 published books, including official biographies of HRH Prince Philip, Duke of Edinburgh (The Duke – a Portrait of Prince Philip, 1991), Hodder & Stoughton), HRH The Princess Margaret (Princess Margaret – a Life Unravelled (2007), Orion Books) and cricket commentator Brian Johnston.

Heald was also known for his mystery novels featuring Simon Bognor, special investigator, (10 titles), serialised by Thames TV, and more recently as creator of Dr Tudor Cornwall in a new crime trilogy published by Robert Hale Ltd: Death and the Visiting Fellow (2004), Death and the D'Urbervilles (2005), A Death on the Ocean Wave (2007). He subsequently returned to the newly knighted Simon Bognor and published two further novels Death in the Opening Chapter and Poison at the Pueblo with Crème de la Crime/ Severn House.

As a journalist, Tim Heald wrote for Punch, The Spectator, The Sunday Times (Atticus column), Daily Express (feature writer 1967–1972), The Times and The Daily Telegraph, and was a freelance book reviewer and feature and travel writer for various other publications. As a speaker, he was often a guest on Cunard cruise ships the QE2 and the Caronia. He was the author of Village Cricket (Little Brown, 2004), on which a Carlton TV series was based.

Heald worked as an academic in creative writing at the University of Tasmania and the University of South Australia between 1997 and 2001. He was a Fellow of the Royal Society of Literature. He was also a strong member of PEN International and chaired the Writers in Prison Committee.

Tim Heald lived in Fowey, Cornwall, for 15 years until 2011 but then moved to south Somerset, where his mother was born and where she and his father are buried.

== Illness and death ==
Suffering from Parkinsonism and Lewy body dementia, Tim Heald died in Martock, Somerset 20 November 2016.

== Bibliography ==
- It's a Dog's Life (1971)
- The Making of Space 1999 (1976)
- John Steed: An Authorized Biography Vol 1 (1977)
- HRH: The Man Who Will Be King (co-author with Mayo Mohs; 1979)
- Caroline R (1980) - novel chronicling a life similar to that of Princess Diana
- Networks: Who We Know & How to Use Them (1983); US title: Old Boy Networks (1984)
- Class Distinctions (1984)
- The Character of Cricket (1986)
- The Rigby File (editor; 1989)
- By Appointment: 150 Years of the Royal Warrant and its Holders (1989)
- The Newest London Spy (editor; 1989)
- My Lord's: A Celebration of the World's Greatest Cricket Ground (editor; 1990)
- A Classic English Crime (editor; 1991)
- The Duke: Portrait of Prince Philip (1991)
- Honourable Estates: The English and their Country Houses (1992)
- A Life of Love: The Life of Barbara Cartland (1994)
- Denis Compton: The Authorized Biography of the Incomparable (1994)
- Brian Johnston: The Authorised Biography (1995)
- Beating Retreat: Hong Kong Under the Last Governor (1997)
- Village Cricket (2004)
- Princess Margaret: A Life Unravelled (2007)
- Jardine's Last Tour: India 1933-34 (2011)
- My Dear Hugh: The Collected Letters of Richard Cobb to Hugh Trevor-Roper and others (2011)
- Tomfoolery - edited work of Tom Baun compiled with his brother, Christopher

=== Simon Bognor series ===
- Unbecoming Habits (1973)
- Blue Blood Will Out (1974)
- Deadline (1975)
- Let Sleeping Dogs Die (1976)
- Just Desserts (1977)
- Murder at Moose Jaw (1981)
- Masterstroke (1982)
- Red Herrings (1985)
- Brought to Book (1988)
- Business Unusual (1989)
- Death in the Opening Chapter (2011)
- Poison at the Pueblo (2012)

=== Dr. Tudor Cornwall series ===
- Death and the Visiting Fellow (2004)
- Death and the D'Urbervilles (2005)
- A Death on the Ocean Wave (2007)
