= Cincinnati Times-Star Building =

- Times-Star Building
- U.S. National Register of Historic Places
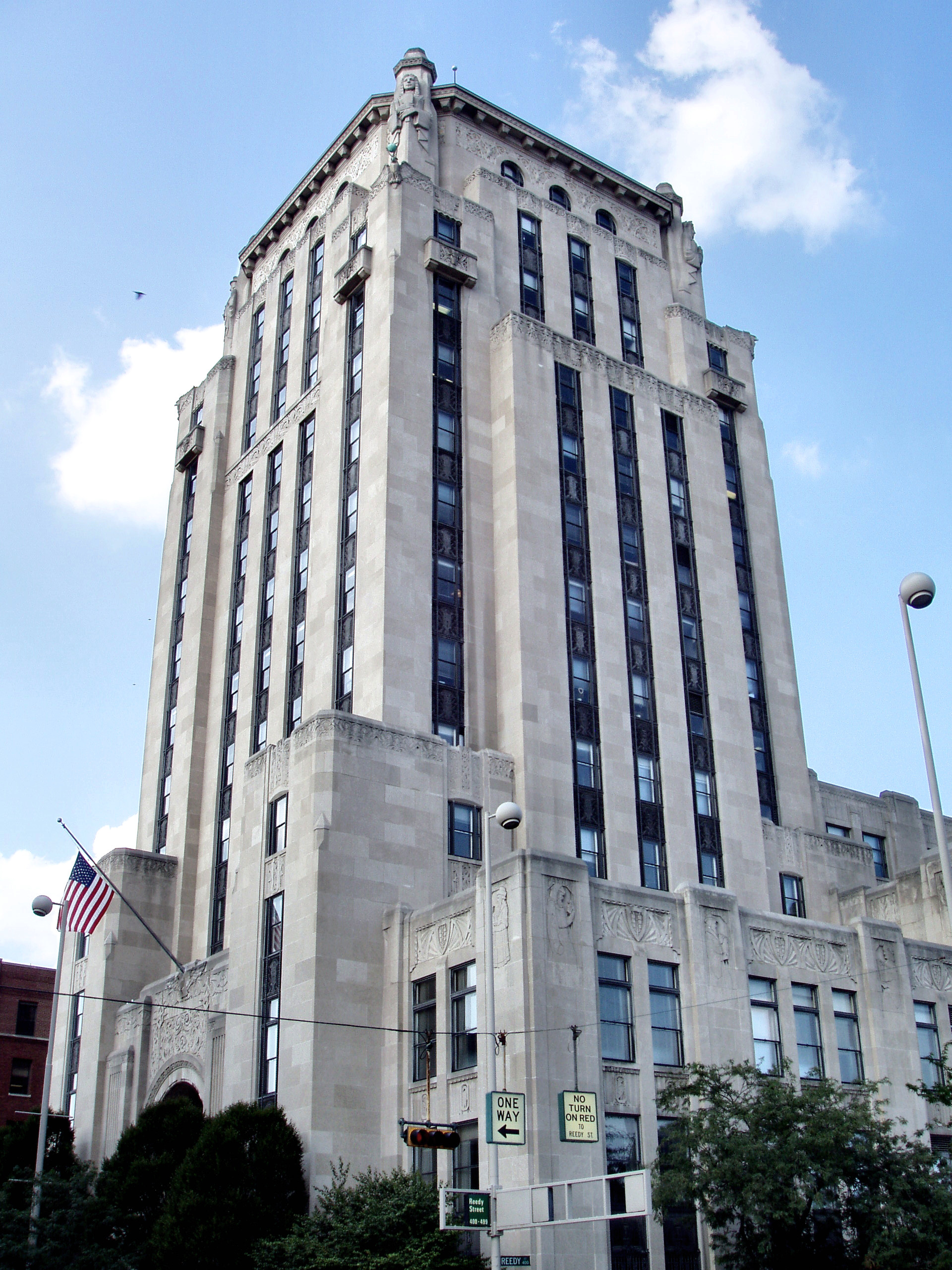
- Times-Star Building in Cincinnati, Ohio, which now houses the Hamilton County probation and domestic relations departments.
- Location: Cincinnati, Ohio
- Coordinates: 39°6′19.71″N 84°30′26.06″W
- Architect: Samuel Hannaford & Sons
- Architectural style: Art Deco
- NRHP reference No.: 83004309
- Added to NRHP: November 25, 1983

Cincinnati Times-Star Building aka Times-Star Building at 800 Broadway Street in Cincinnati, Ohio, is a registered historic building. It was listed in the National Register on November 25, 1983. It was built in 1933 and was designed by the firm of Samuel Hannaford & Sons in the Art Deco style. The limestone building has 15 stories with a basement and sub-basement beneath. There is no 13th floor as superstitions ran high during this time period. Much of the decorated facade pays homage to the printing and publishing businesses. Two hundred feet above the street stand four pillars at each of the tower's corners; they represent patriotism, truth, speed, and progress.

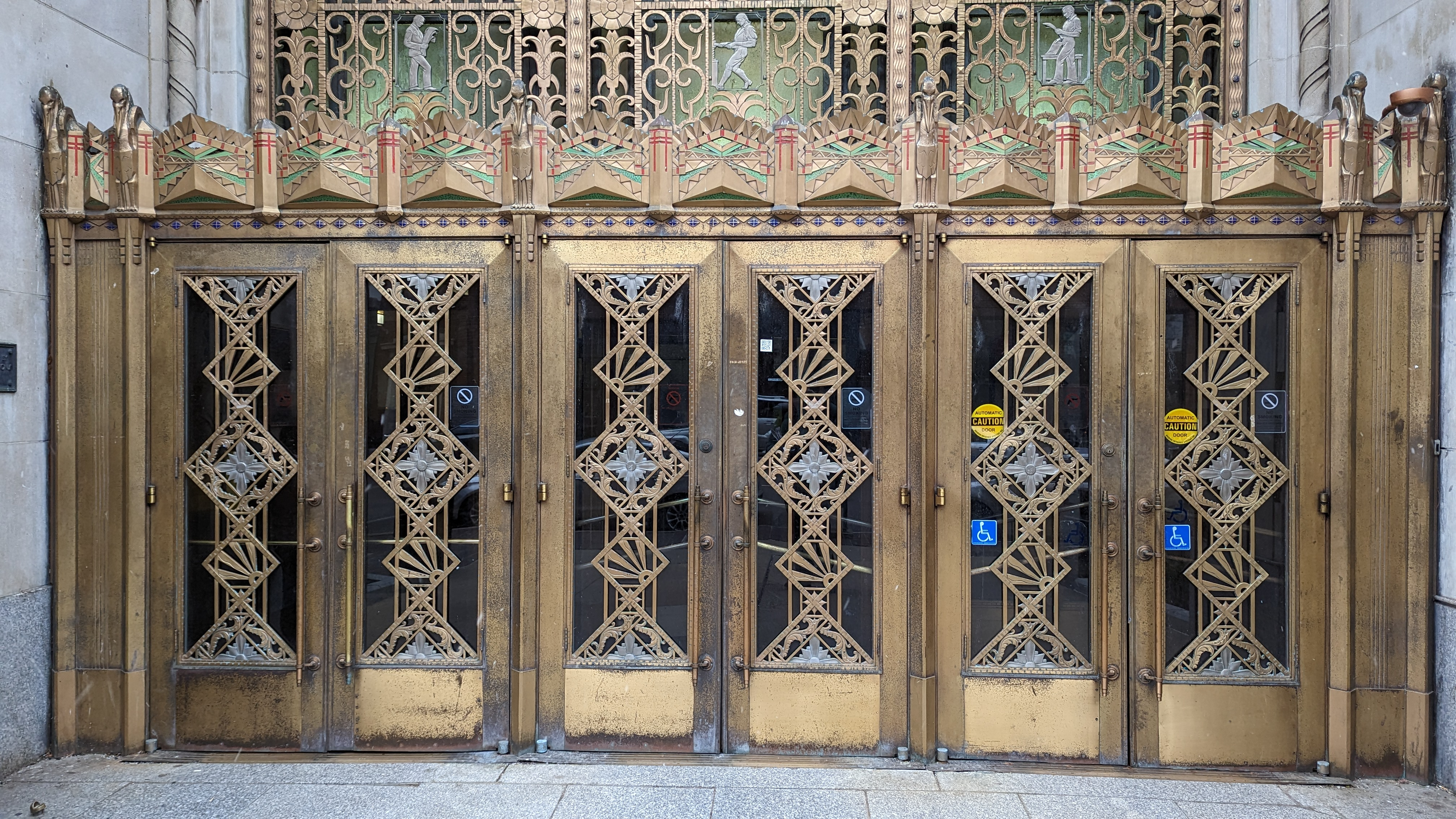
Bronze and Nickel Doors with Enamel decoration of Times-Star Building

The newspaper plant occupied the first six stories. The floors above were offices. The Cincinnati Times-Star was an outgrowth of several newspapers and was owned by Cincinnati's Taft family. Charles Phelps Taft was editor.

Before moving into the Times-Star Building on Broadway on January 1, 1933, the newspaper's offices were on Sixth and Walnut streets.

When the Times-Star folded in 1958, its assets were purchased by its rival, The Cincinnati Post, who moved into the building and occupied it until 1984. Hamilton County bought the building in the late 1980s and renamed it the 800 Broadway Building. It is used for county offices and by the juvenile court.

The building is ornamented with bronze and nickel silver grilles, over the windows, front entrance, and lobby interior.

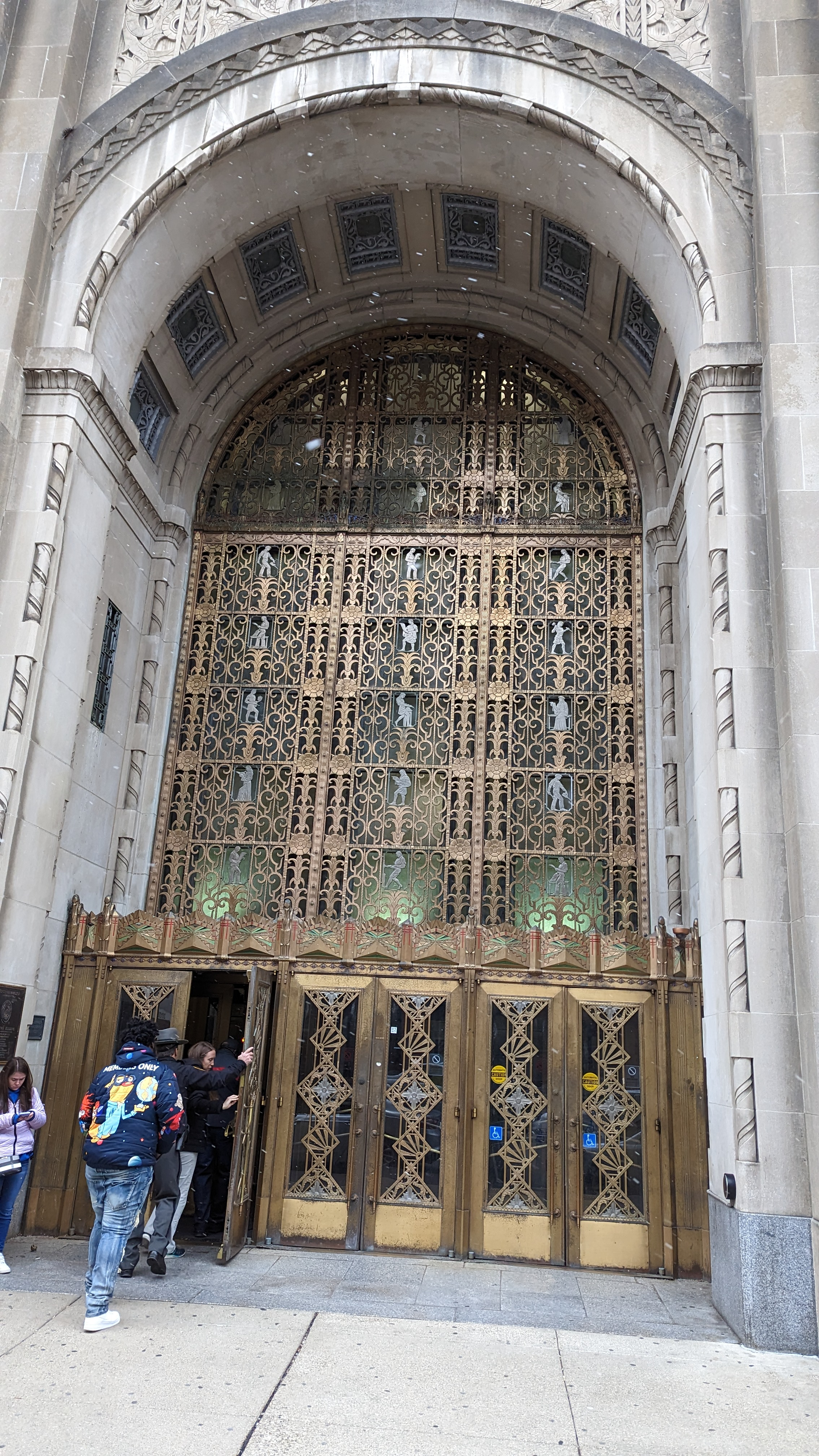
Cast Bronze and Nickel Entrance Grille of the Times-Star Building

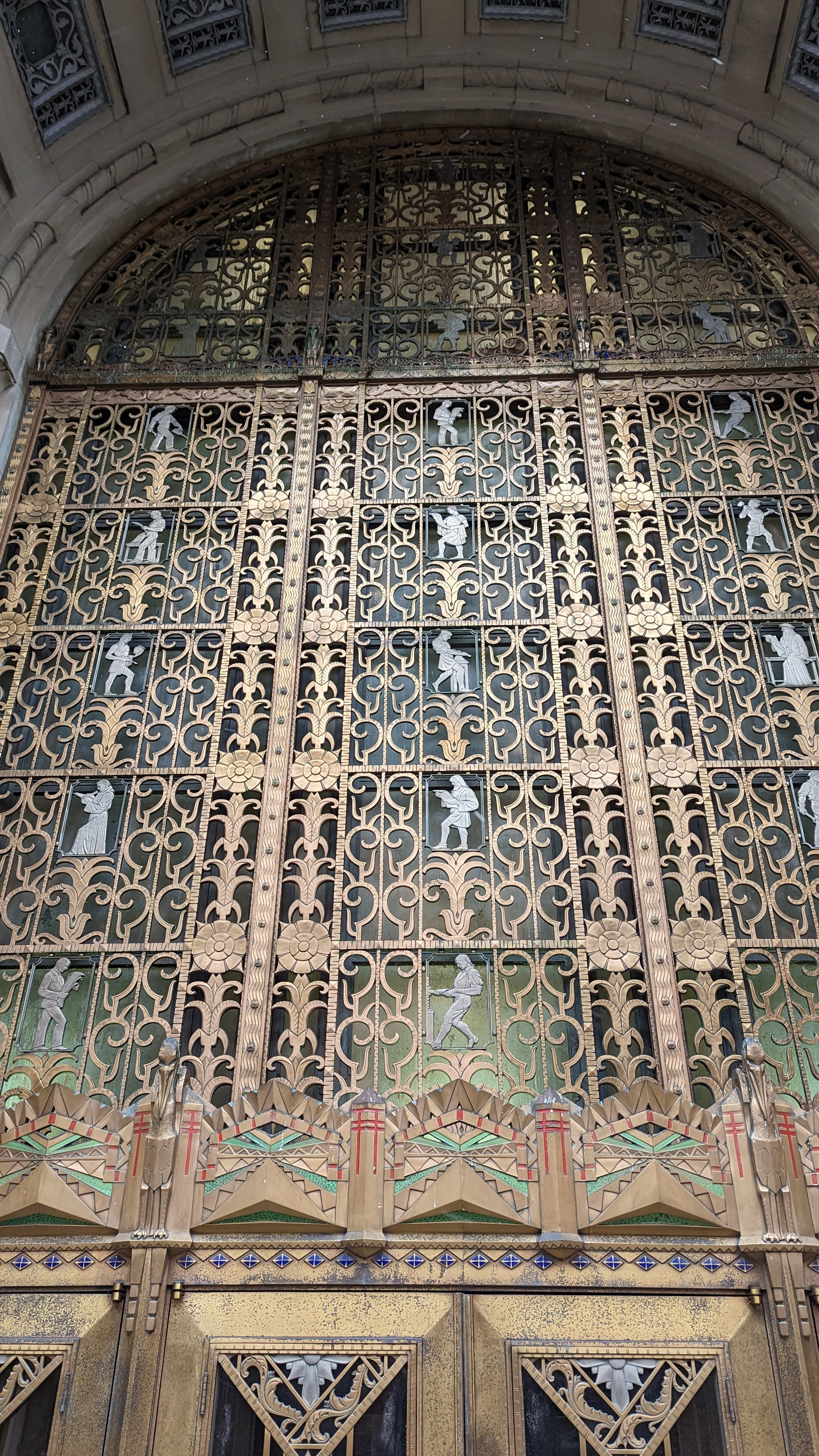
Bronze Grille over Entrance, with Nickel Silver Figures from Printing Industry.
