= James Isaminger =

American sportswriter

- Born: December 6, 1880; Hamilton, Ohio, U.S.
- Died: June 17, 1946 (aged 65); Fawn Grove, Pennsylvania, U.S.
- Occupation: Sportswriter
- Years active: 1895–1940
- Known for: Baseball writing
- Spouse: Ella
- Awards: J. G. Taylor Spink Award (1974)

James Campbell Isaminger (December 6, 1880 – June 17, 1946) was an American sportswriter who worked for newspapers in Philadelphia from 1905 to 1940 and covered every World Series during that period.

== Biography ==
Isaminger was born in Hamilton, Ohio, and worked for the Cincinnati Times-Star from 1895 to 1905. He subsequently worked for the Philadelphia North American before joining The Philadelphia Inquirer in 1925. Isaminger, along with Hugh Fullerton and Ring Lardner, played a major role in reporting the Black Sox scandal in 1919. In 1934, he was elected president of the Baseball Writers' Association of America (BBWAA).

In September 1940, Isaminger suffered a stroke while attending a baseball game at Municipal Stadium in Cleveland. He subsequently retired.

Isaminger died in June 1946 at his home in Fawn Grove, Pennsylvania. (Note: Initial news reports of Isaminger's death stated that he died "at his Maryland estate"—Fawn Grove is on the border of Maryland.) In 1974, he was posthumously honored by the BBWAA with the J. G. Taylor Spink Award for distinguished baseball writing.

== Scorebook collection and historical preservation ==
In addition to his newspaper reporting, Isaminger kept an extensive series of baseball scorebooks. The National Baseball Hall of Fame and Museum Archives holds the James C. Isaminger Scorebook collection (BA MSS 169), consisting of 52 scorebooks dating from 1907 through 1940. The books document spring-training, regular-season and World Series games.

In 2014, David W. Smith, founder of Retrosheet, photographed games from Isaminger's scorebooks at the Hall of Fame as part of an effort to preserve historical play-by-play accounts. Over four days Smith copied 3,588 game accounts, of which 1,003 had not previously been obtained by Retrosheet. The material largely documents home games involving Philadelphia's major-league teams from 1907 through 1939.
