= George B. Cox House =

Historic house in Ohio, United States

- U.S. National Register of Historic Places
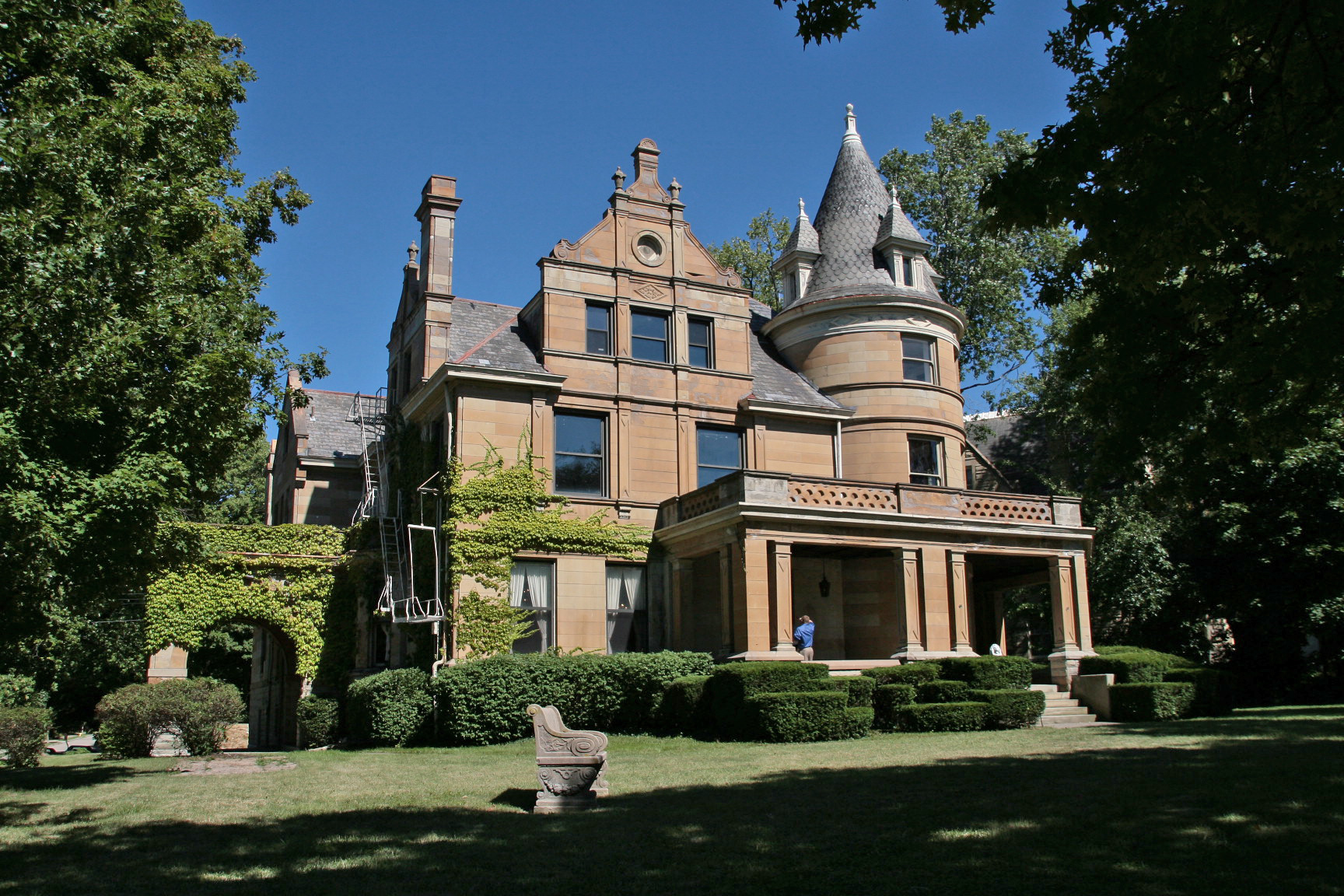
- Facade of the house

- Location within Ohio Location within the United States
- Interactive map showing the location of George B. Cox House
- Location: Brookline and Jefferson Avenues, Cincinnati, Ohio
- Coordinates: 39°8′33″N 84°30′54″W
- Area: Less than 1 acre (0.40 ha)
- Built: 1894
- Architectural style: Italianate
- MPS: Samuel Hannaford and Sons TR in Hamilton County
- NRHP reference No.: 73001456
- Added to NRHP: November 6, 1973

The George B. Cox House is a historic residence in Cincinnati, Ohio, United States. An Italianate building constructed in 1894, this two-and-a-half story building was built as the home of leading Hamilton County politician George B. Cox.

Largely a self-made man, Cox began to support himself and his mother at age eight after his father's death in 1861; within ten years, he entered politics, and at the age of twenty-four, he was elected to City Council. Before the age of thirty, he had laid the groundwork for political domination of the city, and his position as Cincinnati's political boss was firmly cemented by the late 1880s.

In 1894, Cox arranged for the construction of a new house, to be designed by leading Cincinnati architect Samuel Hannaford. The resulting structure is primarily of sandstone construction, with a foundation of stone and a slate roof. Two of its most prominent elements are a large porch that covers the southern front of the house and half of its western side, and a 3 1/2-story circular turret that dominates the rest of the building. Located near the house is a two-car garage; built as a carriage house, its architecture is similar to that of the main house.

Cox's house was built near to the end of Samuel Hannaford's career; in practice since 1858, he retired in 1897 at the age of sixty-two. During his career, he rose to the status of Cincinnati's leading architect, due to his responsibility for such buildings as the Cincinnati Music Hall. Many of his buildings, including the majority of the houses that he designed in Cincinnati, were constructed as the homes of wealthy or powerful members of the city's society; numerous rich and famous individuals of the Gilded Age found his style highly attractive.

Among the owners of Cox's house after his death has been a chapter of Pi Kappa Alpha, which used the building as their fraternity house, and the University of Cincinnati, which purchased the property in 1939 and converted it into a women's dormitory. In late 1973, the Cox House was listed on the National Register of Historic Places, both because of its connection to Cox and because of its historically significant architecture. Seven years later, it became one of twenty houses included in a multiple property submission to the National Register of Hannaford-designed buildings in Cincinnati and surrounding portions of Hamilton County; it was one of the collection's few houses that was already listed on the Register.

In 2010, arrangements were made to transfer ownership of the property to the Public Library of Cincinnati and Hamilton County, which announced plans to convert it into a branch library to serve the surrounding Clifton neighborhood. The library stated that the Cox House would replace a small storefront that previously served the Clifton branch. It opened in 2015.
