= Fred Burns (tennis) =

American tennis player and journalist

Frederick D. Burns (September 6, 1889, in Nevada, Missouri – December 22, 1971, in Cincinnati, Ohio) was an important figure in Midwest amateur tennis in the early part of the 20th century.

Burns was a journalist by profession from 1911 to 1958, and in the 1920s was a writer for The Cincinnati Times-Star (which was absorbed by the Cincinnati Post in the 1950s). He wrote about tennis, and played the game including playing in the National Clay Court Championships in 1915 and Cincinnati's own international tennis tournament, now known as the Cincinnati Open, in 1915, 1916, 1923 and 1925.

In 1925 he was ranked No. 5 in doubles by the United States Tennis Association's Midwest Section.

Burns served as President of the Southern Ohio Tennis Association (the predecessor of the Ohio Valley Tennis Association), and as Chairman of the National Parks Championships committee in 1940.

He also served as President of the USTA Midwest Section and is the namesake of that section's Fred Burns Award which recognizes the author, journalist, sportscaster, newspaper, radio or television station, or other individual which/who contributes the most toward promoting tennis on the local, district or sectional level.

In addition to serving as its President, Mr. Burns bequeathed funds to the USTA/Midwest Section to benefit its programs.

Burns also was a travel writer for the Times-Star and created a travel section in 1929 for that paper. He served as President of the Midwest Travel Writers Association in 1954, and that organization's Fred Burns Memorial Award recognizes the travel-related public relations professional or organization who has shown outstanding professional support to travel journalists.
