= Mayo Mohs =

American magazine editor (1934–1996)

- Born: March 23, 1934
- Died: August 22, 1996 (aged 62)
- Occupation: editor

Mayo A. Mohs (March 23, 1934 – August 22, 1996) was the editor of the 1971 science fiction anthology Other Worlds, Other Gods: Adventures in Religious Science Fiction (Doubleday & Company, 1971, Library of Congress Catalog Card Number 76-144282.) Per the jacket of that book, "Mayo Mohs is religion editor of Time magazine and a long-time science fiction buff. The idea for this collection was originally inspired by an article he wrote for Time on theology and science fiction. A native of St. Paul, Minnesota, Mr. Mohs has been a history teacher and a reporter for the Cincinnati Times Star. He is currently working on a book about the religious ferment in Cuernavaca, Mexico."

Mohs died on August 22, 1996, in Santa Monica, California.
