= David Wecker =

David Wecker is a writer. His experience includes nearly 25 years as a newspaper columnist for The Cincinnati Post, The Kentucky Post and the Scripps News Service. His Post editors said he wrote about ordinary people in a way that made them memorable.

Said Rich Boehne, CEO, E.W. Scripps,

“Dave is one of the best pure communicators I have ever worked with. He has that rare ability to look deep into any subject and pluck from the chaos the most essential and most memorable elements. He carries readers so smoothly that they believe they have found their own way to the heart of the story."

He has co-authored with Eureka! Ranch founder Doug Hall Jump Start Your Brain (Time Warner Books) and Maverick Mindset (Simon & Schuster). In 2005, he co-authored Mastering the Universe: He-Man and the Rise & Fall of a Billion Dollar Idea (Emmis Books), with his uncle, Roger Sweet, who created the concept for the 1980s action figure, He-Man, for Mattel. In 2007, he wrote a collection of essays on 15 Cincinnati families for Now We Are One (Orange Frazer Press), a book about international adoption based on photographs by Michael Wilson.

For 16 years, has been chief concept writer at The Eureka Ranch, where he played a key role in inventing and articulating some 5,000 new business concepts for a long list of Fortune 500 clients – including Nike, Disney, American Express, Chrysler, Frito-Lay, Bank of America and dozens of others.

== Radio ==
Again with Doug Hall, Wecker co-hosted "Brain Brew," a weekly one-hour radio program distributed nationally by Public Radio International for three years until 2005. Prior to that, he co-hosted with Matt Reis "The Backyard Barbecue," a weekly humor show on Clear Channel flagship station, 700-WLW in Cincinnati, Ohio.

Wecker lives in Alexandria, Kentucky, in a 200-year-old log home with his wife, Karen. In 2006, Wecker became a founding partner of Fingerprint Brand Storytelling. In 2007, Wecker became a founding partner in BrandFlick, a firm that provides clients with branding statements on short, concise videos.
