= Hulbert Taft =

American journalist

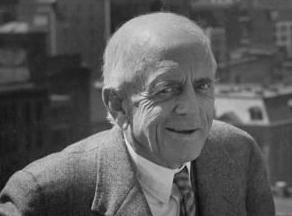
- Born: September 19, 1877; Cincinnati, Ohio
- Died: January 19, 1959 (aged 81); Cincinnati, Ohio
- Resting place: Spring Grove Cemetery, Cincinnati, Ohio
- Education: Yale University
- Occupation: Journalist
- Employer: Cincinnati Times-Star
- Title: Publisher
- Predecessor: Charles Phelps Taft
- Successor: David S. Ingalls
- Spouse(s): Nellie P. Leaman (1880–1927); Virginia Kittredge (1899–1942); Eleanor Gholson (1891–1980)
- Children: Hulbert Taft, Jr. (1907–1967); Katherine Taft Benedict (1909–2001); Margot Taft Tytus (1913–2008); David G. Taft (1915–1962)
- Parents: Peter Rawson Taft II (1846–1889) (father); Annie Matilda Hulbert (1858–1923) (mother)
- Relatives: Alphonso Taft (grandfather); William Howard Taft (Uncle); Charles Phelps Taft (uncle); Robert A. Taft (cousin); Charles Phelps Taft II (cousin)
- Family: Taft family

Hulbert Taft (September 19, 1877 – January 19, 1959) was an American journalist, publisher, and member of the Taft family of Ohio.

As editor, publisher, and later, chairman of the board of directors, of the Cincinnati Times-Star, Taft was an influential figure in local and national politics throughout the first half of the twentieth century.

He was a grandson of Alphonso Taft, Secretary of War during the Grant administration; a nephew of President William Howard Taft; and cousin of Ohio Senator Robert A. Taft.

== Biography ==
Hulbert Taft was born in Cincinnati, Ohio, on September 19, 1877. He was the only son of Peter Rawson Taft II (half brother of William Howard Taft) and Annie Matilda Hulbert.

Following his graduation from Yale University in 1900, Taft joined the staff of the Cincinnati Times-Star as a reporter, and became the Editor in 1908. His uncle, Charles Phelps Taft had been the paper's owner and Publisher since 1880. When Charles died in 1929, Hulbert Taft was named Publisher. Among his more noteworthy assignments, were interviews with Benito Mussolini, in 1929, and later, with Leon Trotsky.

Taft was well known for his political conservatism. The journalist and author John Gunther, in his book Inside U.S.A. referred to Hulbert Taft as the "most conservative man I met in forty-eight states". Taft's editorials and political endorsements published in the Cincinnati Times-Star made him an influential figure in local and national politics for fifty years. Many considered him a "king maker". Political candidates viewed his endorsements as "tantamount to election".

Taft retired as Publisher of the Cincinnati Times-Star in 1954, but remained as chairman of the board of Directors until 1958, when the newspaper was acquired by the E.W. Scripps Company.

== Family ==
Hulbert Taft was married three times. His first marriage to Nellie Phillips Leaman on April 4, 1904, produced four children: Hulbert Taft, Jr.; Katherine Phillips Taft Benedict; Margot Leaman Taft Tytus; and David Gibson Taft.

His second marriage was to Nellie's niece, Virginia Kittredge, on July 21, 1928. Eleanor Lawrence Gholson, Taft's third wife, was a distant relative of Virginia's. Their marriage occurred on April 9, 1946.
