= Earl Lawson (sportswriter) =

American sportswriter

- Born: February 1, 1923
- Died: January 14, 2003 (aged 79); Sacramento, California
- Employer(s): Cincinnati Times-Star, The Cincinnati Post
- Known for: Sportswriter

Earl Lawson (February 1, 1923 – January 14, 2003) was an American sportswriter for newspapers in Cincinnati, Ohio. He covered the Cincinnati Reds from 1949 to 1984.

In 1949, Lawson first began covering the Cincinnati Reds for the Cincinnati Times-Star. He was the beat reporter for the Reds at the Times-Star from 1951 to 1958 and at The Cincinnati Post from 1958 to 1984. Lawson had a series of run-ins with the Reds in his early year as a beat reporter covering the team. In June 1953, manager Rogers Hornsby barred Lawson from the locker room after Lawson questioned Hornsby's decision not to replace a pitcher. In June 1957, Lawson got into a fight with Reds' second baseman Johnny Temple after a game in which Lawson, who also served as official scorer, charged Temple with a fielding error. Temple reportedly greeted Lawson with a "blistering barrage of profanity" and knocked Lawson to the ground before other players separated them. In June 1962, Reds' star outfielder Vada Pinson punched Lawson on the chin after Lawson wrote an article criticizing the Reds for lackadaisical fielding. Lawson joked to fellow reporters that, based on first-hand knowledge, Pinson was a harder puncher than Temple. After a second incident, in September 1963, in which Pinson allegedly grabbed Lawson by the neck and pushed him against a wall, Lawson filed assault and battery charges against Pinson. A trial in December 1963 resulted in a hung jury. He was also a correspondent for The Sporting News for many years and wrote for The Saturday Evening Post during its days of using iconic Norman Rockwell covers. In 1976, Lawson was elected as the president of the Baseball Writers' Association of America.

In 1985, Lawson was honored by the Baseball Writers' Association of America with the J. G. Taylor Spink Award for distinguished baseball writing.

In 1987, Lawson published his autobiography, Cincinnati Seasons: My 34 Years With the Reds. Lawson wrote in his autobiography that he had been able to live like a millionaire while being paid to do it. He recalled that he had "mingled with the sports celebrities of the world and formed friendships that I'll cherish forever ... I was a baseball writer."

Lawson moved to Sacramento, California, in 2000 to live with his daughter, Lisa Helene Lawson (Damron). In January 2003, he died of cancer and was interred in Arlington National Cemetery July 3, 2003.

== Selected articles by Lawson ==
- Gary Nolan: The Confidence Kid (Gary Nolan), Baseball Digest, May 1969
- No More Eccentric Capers for Carbo (Bernie Carbo), Baseball Digest, July 1970
- Anatomy of an Arm Problem (Don Gullett), Baseball Digest, December 1976
- Pete Rose Recalls Career Highlights in Each Park (Pete Rose), Baseball Digest, September 1977
- Ed Kranepool: Last of the Original Mets (Ed Kranepool), Baseball Digest, September 1979
- Gaylord Perry: Next in Line to Win 300 Games (Gaylord Perry), Baseball Digest, August 1981
- Memories of Major League Spring Training in the 1950s, Baseball Digest, May 1992
- Memories of a Younger Sparky Anderson (Sparky Anderson), Baseball Digest, August 1992
- Reds' Relief Corps Has Been Populated by 'Free Spirits' (Pedro Borbón/Ryne Duren), Baseball Digest, November 1992
- How Injuries Shortened Careers of 4 Reds Pitchers (Jim Maloney, Gary Nolan, Don Gullett, Wayne Simpson), Baseball Digest, May 1993
- Joe Nuxhall Recalls Last Time He Faced Stan Musial (Joe Nuxhall), Baseball Digest, July 1996
