= The Cincinnati Post =

Defunct afternoon daily newspaper in Cincinnati, Ohio, United States

The Cincinnati Post The Kentucky Post
- "Farewell Edition" (last issue) of the Post
- Type: Defunct
- Format: Berliner
- Owner: Scripps-Howard Newspapers
- Editor: Mike Philipps
- Staff writers: 52
- Founded: January 3, 1881
- Ceased publication: December 31, 2007
- Language: English
- Headquarters: 125 E. Court St. Cincinnati, Ohio 45202; United States
- City: Cincinnati, Ohio
- Country: United States
- Circulation: 25,000 (as of 2007)
- Price: 50 cents
- OCLC number: 51645668
- Website: news.cincypost.com at the Wayback Machine (archived October 22, 2007)

The Cincinnati Post was an afternoon daily newspaper published in Cincinnati, Ohio, United States. In Northern Kentucky, it was bundled inside a local edition called The Kentucky Post.

The Post was a founding publication and onetime flagship of Scripps-Howard Newspapers, a division of the E. W. Scripps Company. For much of its history, the Post was the most widely read paper in the Cincinnati market. Its readership was concentrated on the West Side of Cincinnati, as well as in Northern Kentucky, where it was considered the newspaper of record.

The Post began publishing in 1881 and launched its Northern Kentucky edition in 1890. It acquired The Cincinnati Times-Star in 1958. The Post ceased publication at the end of 2007, after 30 years in a joint operating agreement with The Cincinnati Enquirer.

== Content ==
The Post was known throughout its history for investigative journalism and focus on local coverage, characteristics common to Scripps papers. As one of the first successful penny presses outside the East Coast, the Post was written primarily for blue collar laborers who had no time to read a newspaper in the morning. Its articles were written to be easily readable. In its heyday, the paper consistently championed good governance and labor rights.

Though the Post considered itself politically independent, it historically tended to support progressive politicians relative to the Times-Star and Enquirer. The Post's editorial position became uniformly conservative in the years following its merger with the Times-Star, according to Stevens (1969). By the early 1990s, the paper's political stance had become "a grumpily conservative sigh of resentment" according to journalist William Greider.

== Schedule ==
The Post published regular editions on weekday afternoons and a Weekender edition on Saturday mornings. In keeping with Scripps tradition, the Post did not publish on Sundays for most of its history. However, it did publish a Sunday edition from November 30, 1924, to December 18, 1932. The Post published on schedule from its founding as The Penny Paper in 1881 until 1967. From October 30 to November 2, 1967, 300 Newspaper Guild members struck along with Pressmen and Stereotypers, while Printers were locked out.

== History ==
=== Early years ===
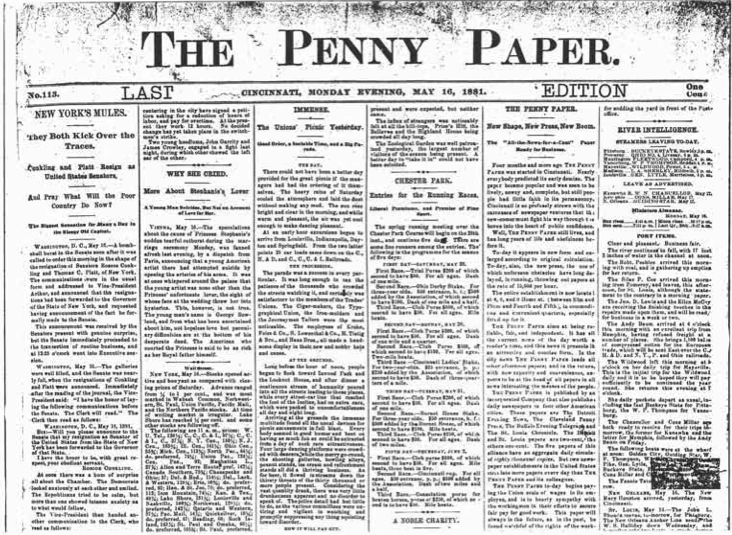
The Penny Paper on May 16, 1881.

The Cincinnati Post began on January 3, 1881, as The Penny Paper, published from a second floor office at Vine and Longworth streets. The publishers, Walter E. Wellman and his brother Frank, hoped to emulate the success of the Cleveland Penny Press. By March, they ran out of funds and took an investment from James E. Scripps and half-brother Edward Willis Scripps, who ran the Penny Press. They used the funds to purchase a press and move the paper to larger facility on Home Street. In October, Walter Wellman was framed for blackmail in retaliation for exposés of policy racketeers and the police. Wellman fled to Kentucky, where he was unlikely to face extradition, and left the Scripps brothers in charge of operations at "the blackmailing sheet".

The Cincinnati Enquirer called The Penny Paper "a fair success" in its first year, estimating the upstart's circulation at about 6,000, fifth in a market served by seven papers in English and five in German. E. W. Scripps estimated daily circulation at 7,000 in the city and 6,000 in the countryside, before countryside distribution was discontinued to save money.

With an editorial staff that leaned Republican and included a former minister, The Penny Paper was seen as "the spokesman and the organ of the religious element of the community", according to Scripps. When in 1882 the "Boy Preacher" Rev. Thomas Harrison held 13 weeks of camp meetings in Cincinnati, "the boy preacher and the little Penny [Paper] were vying with each other and cooperating with each other in the way of saving souls." The paper's circulation quickly quadrupled.

On February 11, 1883, the paper was given a more distinctive name, The Penny Post, because "Penny Paper" was "more of a description of the paper than a name". In July, the Scripps family assumed full ownership of the company, with E. W. having a controlling interest. It was the first paper that he had ever owned. It became The Evening Post on October 11, 1883 – though the price would remain at one penny until 1918. On September 2, 1890, it was finally renamed The Cincinnati Post. On September 15, a Kentucky edition debuted with coverage of Covington, Newport, Bellevue, Dayton, and Ludlow by a dedicated staff in Covington. One year later, Scripps renamed it The Kentucky Post and began distributing it as a full-fledged publication wrapped around the Cincinnati paper at no additional charge. The Kentucky Post soon put its sole rival, The Commonwealth, out of business. By the time the local typographical union debuted its own penny paper, the News, in 1894, the Post had added such thorough coverage of labor relations that the News folded within two months.

In 1894, E. W. Scripps and his half-brother, George H. Scripps, organized their various papers into the first modern newspaper chain. In July 1895, it was named the Scripps-McRae League in recognition of Post general manager Milton A. McRae, a longtime partner. By 1903, the Post boasted of leading all Cincinnati dailies with a sworn daily average circulation of 146,884.

=== Crusader for reform ===
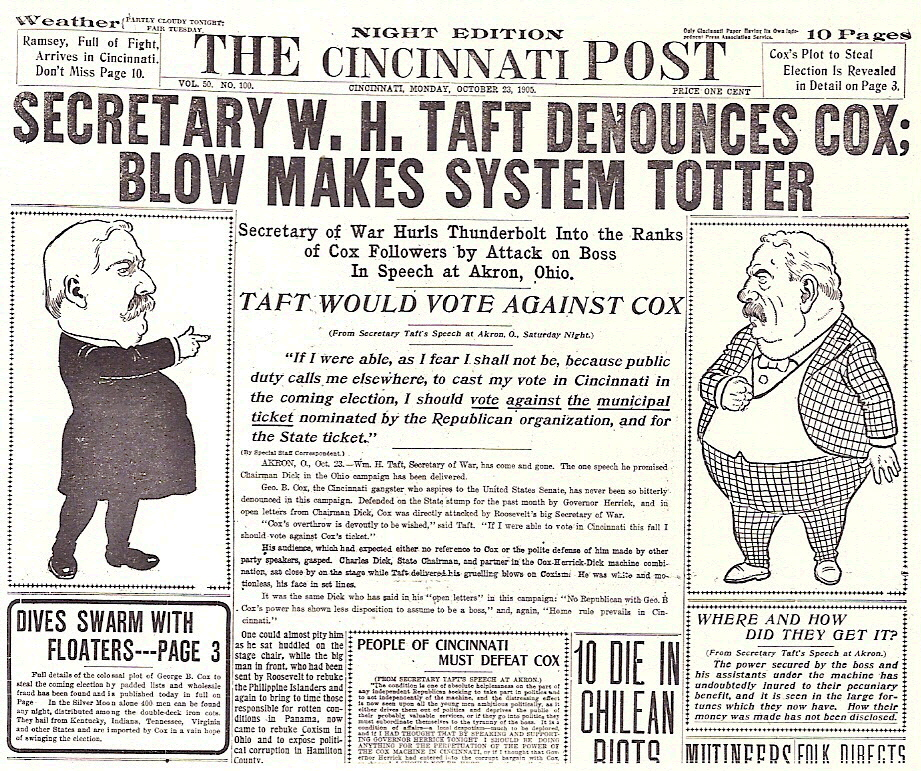
The October 23, 1905, issue of the Post reprinted a speech by War Secretary William Howard Taft attacking Boss Cox.

From its founding to 1930, the Post crusaded against bossism, aligning with the Democratic Party locally. In 1883, it launched a campaign against Thomas C. Campbell, a notorious jury fixer. Campbell responded by suing the paper for libel in front of a partially fixed jury. Amid threats from the Cox machine, the Post hired bodyguards for its editors and managers. Boss Campbell's regime ended with the courthouse riots of 1884. In 1889, the Post put the Cincinnati Telegram, an afternoon competitor once run by Campbell, out of business by secretly financing its unsuccessful move to morning publication. In 1904 and 1905, the Post directed its fire against Campbell's protégé, George B. Cox, exposing graft and lampooning his affiliates with the help of cartoonist Homer Davenport. The Post's afternoon competitor, the Taft-owned Times-Star, strongly supported Boss Cox.

In 1904, at President Theodore Roosevelt's suggestion, the Post became the first newspaper in the country to endorse William Howard Taft for president in 1908. Corporate president Milton A. McRae had long been a supporter of the Cincinnati native, despite the Taft family owning the Times-Star and generally supporting the Cox machine. McRae secured the help of Times-Star editor Charles Phelps Taft in publicizing the editorial. The Post retracted its endorsement just before the 1908 election and by 1910 had resumed its attacks on President Taft and the Republican Party.

The Post's frequent reports of collusion would at times decimate advertising revenue. However, the paper always turned a profit because the exposés were immensely popular with readers. The Post's role in a 1905 Democratic mayoral victory led some advertisers to boycott the paper for up to a decade, and its valuation fell by half. The paper habitually refused advertisements attacking labor unions, such as those by Postum Cereals in 1905. In 1914, the Post weathered a severe drop in advertising after it exposed a scheme to extend the franchises of the local utilities and sided with striking streetcar workers. Still, disappointed that the Post's advertising business always pressured the paper to moderate its investigative reporting, E. W. Scripps founded the Chicago Day Book in 1911 as an experimental daily paper entirely devoid of advertising. The Day Book folded in 1917.

In 1924, the Post was the only Cincinnati daily that endorsed a new municipal charter based on the council–manager system, nonpartisan elections, and proportional representation. The enactment of this charter the following year propelled the Charter Committee to power and led to the demise of political machines in Cincinnati, ultimately dooming the Cincinnati Subway that was seen as a product of bossism. In 1936, the Post backed the nonpartisan movement as it expanded to the Hamilton County government. In 1947, the Post successfully defended the proportional representation system against a campaign by Charles P. Taft to repeal it.

=== Consolidation ===
On October 1, 1935, the Post's corporate parent, Scripps-Howard Newspapers, entered the radio business by purchasing AM station WFBE 1230. The callsign was changed to WCPO, for "The Voice of the Cincinnati Post", and the station switched to a news radio format. Initially, the station's main studios were located in David Sinton's hotel, while news bulletins originated from a broom closet adjacent to the Post city room. WCPO-TV signed on the air on July 26, 1949.

By the late 1940s, sales of The Cincinnati Enquirer, Cincinnati's remaining morning daily, had increased dramatically, fueled in part by the success of its Sunday morning monopoly; meanwhile, the Post and especially The Cincinnati Times-Star faced a declining afternoon market. In 1948 and 1949, lawyers for Scripps-Howard and The Times-Star Company discussed the possibility of jointly publishing a Sunday morning edition called the Times-Post. The two companies determined that they would be safe from Sherman Act investigations, which were rare in the newspaper industry; however, they eventually scrapped the idea for fear that the Enquirer would sue them for any losses. Another factor was the difficulty of establishing a Sunday carrier system.

On April 26, 1956, Scripps-Howard purchased a 36.5% controlling interest in the Enquirer for $4,059,000, beating out The Times-Star Company's $2,380,051 and Tribune Publishing's $15 per share, or $2,238,000. Then, on July 20, 1958, Scripps also acquired the Times-Star, merging the afternoon paper with the Post. Only three Times-Star reporters were retained. The combined paper operated out of the Cincinnati Times-Star Building, noted for its Art Deco architecture. The paper would be published under the name The Cincinnati Post and Times-Star until December 31, 1974, when it reverted to The Cincinnati Post.

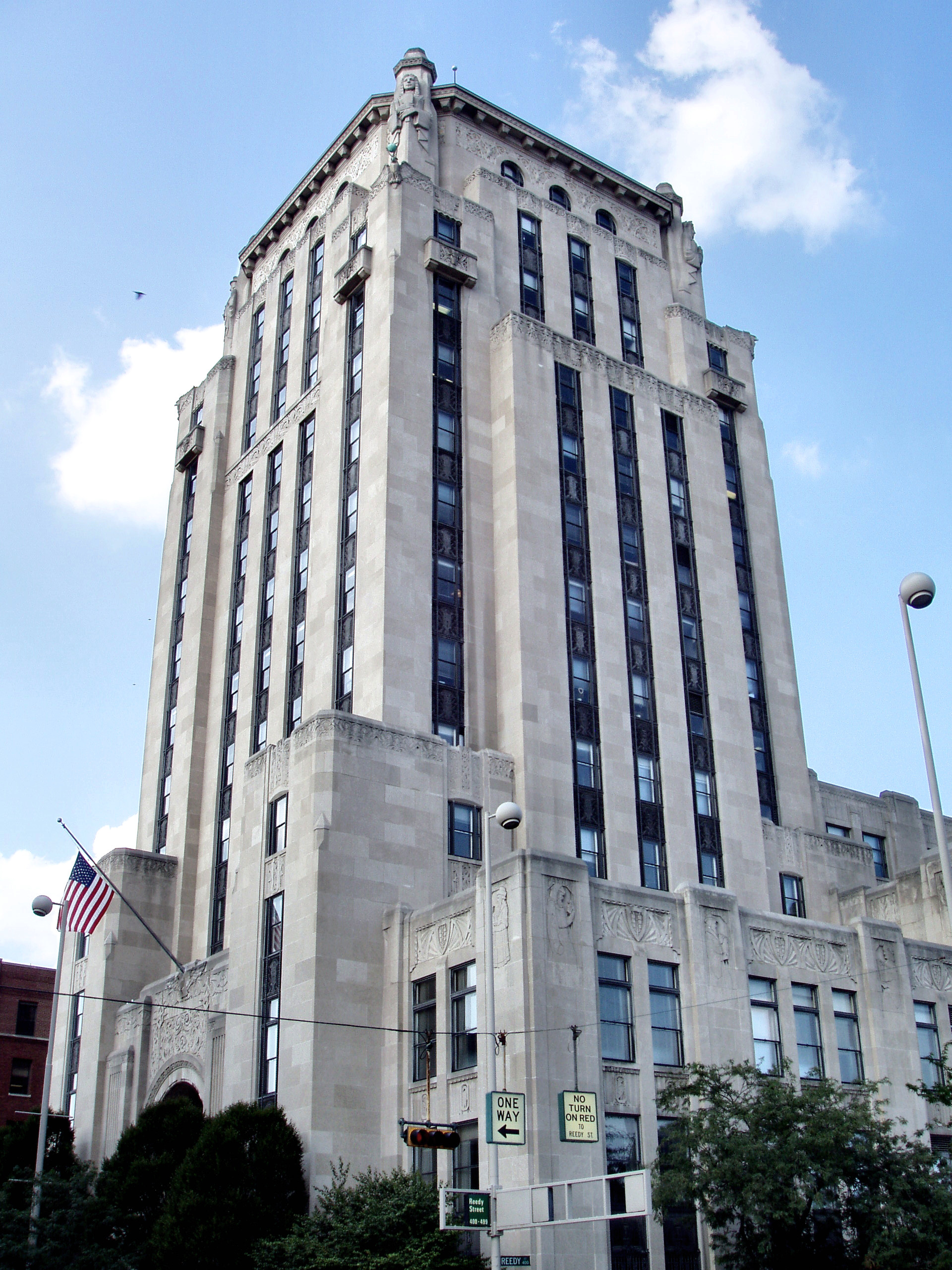
The Post published from the Times-Star Building from 1958 to 1984. American Financial, the Enquirer's corporate parent, purchased the building in 1975.

Post circulation peaked in 1961. Combined Cincinnati Post and Kentucky Post circulation was 275,000, including nearly 60,000 for the Kentucky edition alone. In 1968, the Post had 50,000 more daily subscriptions than the Enquirer. In the 1960s, the Kentucky Post dominated the newspaper market in 12 Kentucky counties: Bracken, Boone, Campbell, Carroll, Gallatin, Grant, Harrison, Kenton, Mason, Owen, Pendleton, and Robertson.

With the Times-Star and Enquirer acquisitions, the Scripps family owned all of Cincinnati's dailies, along with WCPO-AM, WCPO-FM, and WCPO-TV, which consistently led local television ratings with Al Schottelkotte's news reports. The E. W. Scripps Company operated the Enquirer at arm's length, even omitting the Scripps lighthouse logo from the Enquirer's nameplate. Nevertheless, the United States Department of Justice filed an antitrust suit against the company in 1964. In 1968, Scripps entered into a consent decree to sell the Enquirer. It was sold to Carl Lindner, Jr.'s American Financial Corporation on February 20, 1971.

=== Joint operating agreement ===
On September 22, 1977, the Post signed a joint operating agreement (JOA) with The Cincinnati Enquirer. For two years, the Post had secretly negotiated the terms of the JOA with the Enquirer while securing concessions from labor unions. The two papers petitioned the Justice Department for an antitrust exemption under the Newspaper Preservation Act of 1970. This was the second JOA application under the Newspaper Preservation Act; the first, involving the Anchorage Daily News and Anchorage Times, was summarily approved but already seen as a failure.

At Justice Department hearings, the Post claimed to be the brink of financial failure, with losses over the previous six years totaling $12 million. Scripps-Howard argued that the JOA would preserve a second editorial voice in Cincinnati, a "no-growth market". However, Post employees and suburban newspaper publishers accused the Post of producing artificial losses in an attempt to secure expected profits from a JOA. Scripps-Howard rejected an informal offer by Larry Flynt to help fund a takeover of the Post by its employees instead of signing the JOA. Post coverage of the proceedings was limited to a single Saturday article, in contrast to multiple reports published in the Enquirer.

The Enquirer–Post agreement was approved on November 26, 1979, taking effect after negotiations and legal battles with unions, including with 131 Post printers who had been guaranteed jobs for life. As the more financially sound paper, the Enquirer received an 80% stake in the business and handled all business functions of both papers, including printing, distribution, and selling advertising. The Post forwent Sunday publishing, a major advantage the Enquirer had over the Post. The Post eliminated 500 of 600 jobs as a result of the agreement.

On April 10, 2000, the Enquirer and Post downsized from a traditional 12 5/16-inch-wide (313 mm) broadsheet format to an 11 5/8-inch-wide (300 mm) format similar to Berliner. They also began publishing in color every day of the week. Gannett promoted the narrower format as being "easier to handle, hold, and read" but also cited reduced newsprint costs.

=== Decline and closure ===
In a pattern seen throughout the industry, the Post declined severely during the 30-year term of the JOA, particularly during the 1980s. In 1977, when the agreement was announced, the Post had a daily circulation of 195,000, more than the Enquirer, but by September 2003, the Post's daily circulation had fallen to 42,219, or 23% of the Enquirer's 182,176. By this time, the Post had shifted its focus to the Kentucky edition, and sister station WCPO-TV more often partnered with the Enquirer than with the Post.

In January 2004, the Enquirer informed the Post of its intention to let the JOA expire on December 31, 2007. That spring, the Post ended distribution in the northern suburbs in Butler and Warren counties to concentrate on Hamilton County and its Northern Kentucky edition. Also that year, political cartoonist Jeff Stahler left the Post for The Columbus Dispatch. In June 2005, the Post closed its Kentucky newsroom and announced early retirement offers to employees in advance of its probable closure. These changes resulted in profits of $23.5 million in 2005 and $20.7 million the following year.

In 2006, the Post ended its 115-year practice of bundling the Cincinnati Post inside the Kentucky Post. By then, the Kentucky paper had eclipsed its Cincinnati counterpart in circulation, despite the Enquirer limiting distribution to certain parts of three Northern Kentucky counties. By 2007, the paper employed only 52 newsroom staff, while its circulation had declined to 27,000, an estimated four percent of local households. On July 17, parent company E. W. Scripps confirmed that both The Cincinnati Post and The Kentucky Post would cease publication on the day of the JOA's expiration.

The Post published its final print edition on December 31, 2007. The commemorative "Farewell Edition" led with the headline "-30-", meaning "the end" in newsroom jargon. About 30 Enquirer employees assigned to Post operations lost their jobs. At a farewell party in the Post newsroom, a string quartet that included a Post copy editor played a reconstruction of the "Cincinnati Post Jubilee March," one of three marches composed for the paper's 50th anniversary. John N. Klohr and Frank Simon also wrote Post marches. WCPO-TV replaced the Post as sponsor of the local qualification rounds of the Scripps National Spelling Bee.

The Post came to an end due to a number of factors, including the end of the joint operating agreement, a 75% decrease in readership, and decreasing advertising revenues. By the paper's closing, its circulation had fallen to about 25,000 on weekdays and 34,000 on Saturdays, versus the Enquirer's 195,000 on weekdays and Saturdays and 280,000 on Sundays. However, some Post employees faulted the Enquirer for neglecting its partner, citing empty or outdated newsboxes and uncooperative subscription agents. A 2009 study attempted to measure the impact of the Post's closure on the political process in Northern Kentucky, a traditional stronghold for the paper. It concluded that the closure caused an initial short-term decline in political competition and voter turnout, despite the Post having low circulation in its final years.

By 2025, a non-profit group called the Child Advocacy for Rights & Equity claimed to have resurrected the paper.

== Online presence ==
On November 1, 1996, the Post launched its website, @The Post. Due to a joint operating agreement with the Enquirer, it launched concurrently with the Enquirer's site, Enquirer.com. A shared website, GoCincinnati!, displayed classified advertising and offered dial-up Internet access subscriptions. Local access numbers were available in cities throughout the country through a network of Gannett publications. Both papers' home pages moved to a more memorable domain, Cincinnati.com, on November 1, 1998. The new brand encompassed about 300 local commercial sites and some community organizations.

The day after the Post's closure, Scripps launched KYPost.com as a Northern Kentucky news website to compete with Enquirer sister site NKY.com. A dedicated staff embedded in WCPO-TV's newsroom supplemented content from WCPO.com. In 2009, the website had two staff members plus interns. In 2013, KYPost.com began redirecting visitors to WCPO.com.

Archives of Post articles can be found in online subscription databases. NewsBank contains Cincinnati Post and Kentucky Post articles from 1882 to 2007. Until its closure, HighBeam Research contained 313,031 Cincinnati Post articles from 1996 to 2007.

== Notable people ==
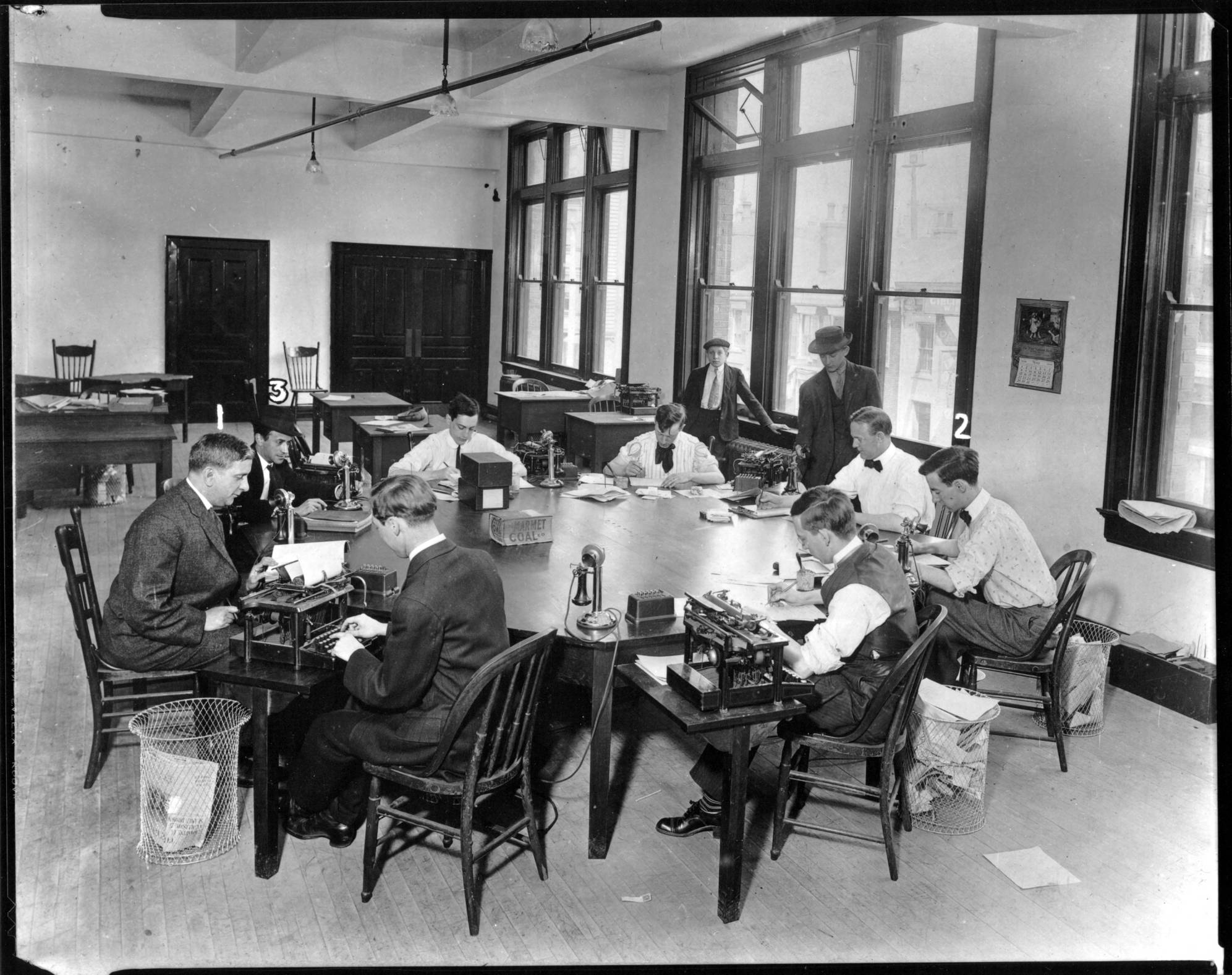
The city copy desk in 1907 or 1910. O. O. McIntyre is shown seated at 1 o'clock.

=== Contributors ===
Many of the following people started their careers as Post contributors:

- Clay Wade Bailey – Kentucky statehouse reporter for whom the Clay Wade Bailey Bridge is named
- Richard A. Boehne – President & CEO of the E. W. Scripps Company
- E. A. Bushnell – political cartoonist
- Nick Clooney – news anchor and father of George Clooney
- Irvin S. Cobb – author and columnist
- Jerry Crasnick – baseball writer for ESPN
- Russel Crouse – playwright
- Homer Davenport – political cartoonist
- Robert Edward Edmondson – anti-Jewish pamphleteer
- Freeman Fulbright – editor of Newsweek and the New York Herald Tribune
- William Greider – author
- Ellis Henican – columnist and political analyst
- Greg Hoard – sportscaster
- Michael Kelly – editor-at-large of The Atlantic Monthly and columnist for The Washington Post
- Stephanie J. Jones – public affairs strategist, attorney, and author
- Earl Lawson – sportswriter
- Ray Long – editor-in-chief of Cosmopolitan
- Jay Mariotti – sports broadcaster
- Joe Posnanski – reporter for Sports Illustrated and bestselling sports author
- Jerry Rubin – social activist, businessman
- H. G. Salsinger – sports editor of The Detroit News
- Eugene Walter – playwright
- Bill Watterson – creator of Calvin and Hobbes
- Gary Webb – Pulitzer Prize–winning investigative journalist
- H. T. Webster – cartoonist
- David Wecker – columnist

=== Cincinnati Post editors ===
- Walter E. Wellman (1881)
- Robert B. Ross (1881–1883)
- John H. Ridenour (1883–1886)
- Delos R. Baker (1886–1889)
- L. T. Atwood (1889–1895)
- Charles F. Mosher (1895–1905)
- John Vandercook (1905–1906)
- Harry Brown (1906–1914)
- Victor Morgan (1914–1915)
- Frank W. Rostock (1915–1921)
- Elmer P. Fries (1921–1929)
- Frank W. Rostock (1929–1933)
- Carl Groat (1933–1953)
- Dick Thornburg (1953–1969)
- Walter Friedenberg (1969–1977)
- William R. Burleigh (1977–1983)
- Paul Knue (1983–2001)
- Mike Philipps (2001–2007)

=== Kentucky Post editors ===
- William Purnell Campbell (1891–1904)
- Harry W. Brown (1904–1906)
- Milton J. Bonner (1906–1915)
- Frank Crippen (1915)
- Charles W. Larsh (1916–1918)
- Albert W. Burhman (1918)
- Edward P. Mills (1918–1919)
- Max B. Cook (1919–1921)
- Bruce I. Susong (1921–1931)
- Donald E. Weaver (1931–1936)
- Carl A. Saunders (1936–1962)
- Vance Trimble (1963–1979)
- Paul Knue (1979–1983)
- Judith Clabes (1983–1995)
- Paul Knue (1995–2001)
- Mike Philipps (2001–2007)

=== Others ===
- William L. Mallory, Sr. – paper boy; later majority leader in the Ohio House of Representatives
- O. O. McIntyre – managing editor; later a New York columnist
- Milton A. McRae – advertising manager; later cofounder of Scripps-Howard
- Alicia Reece – intern; later Cincinnati Vice-Mayor
