= George B. Cox =

American politician (1853–1916)

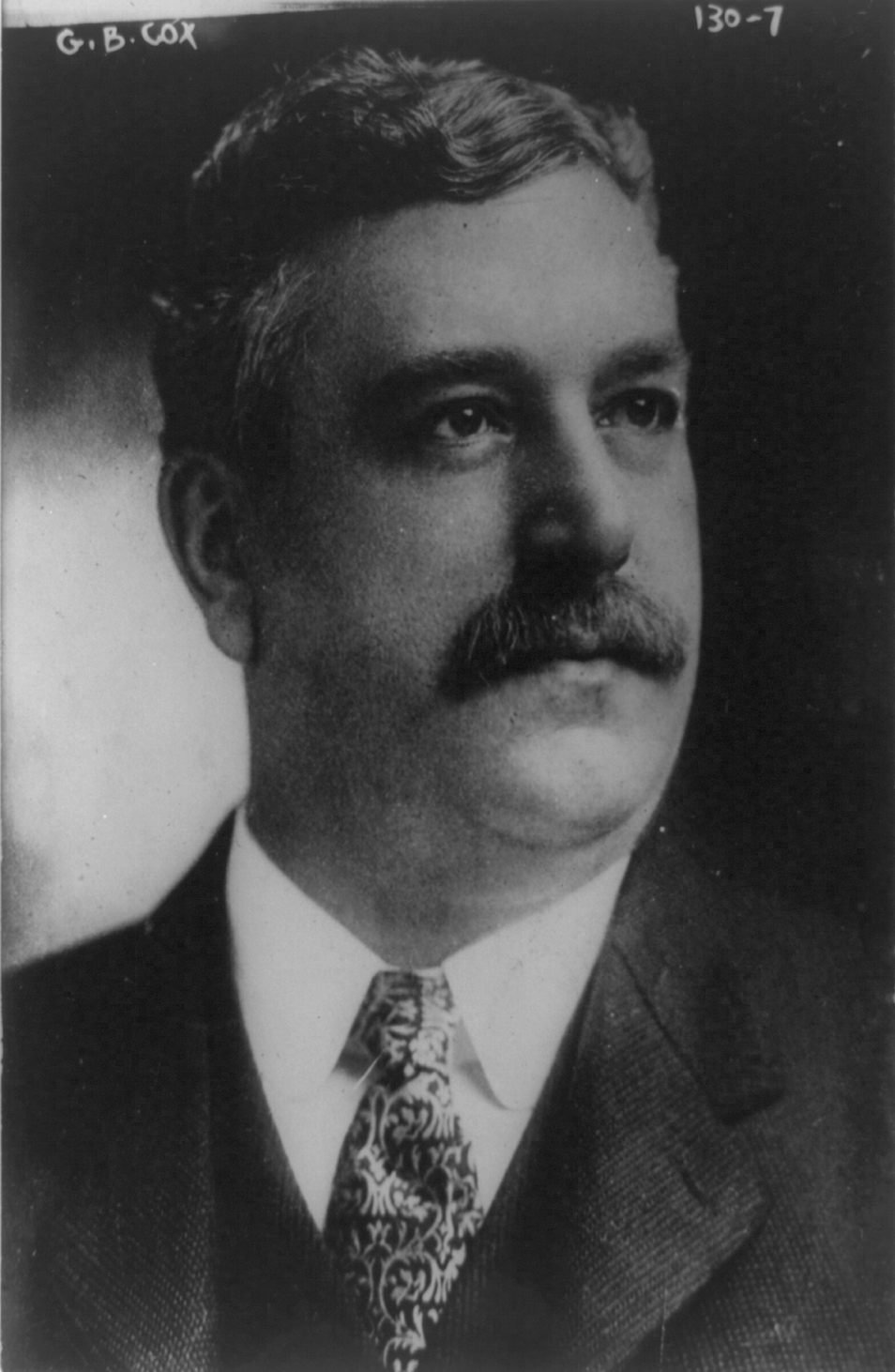
George Cox in 1911.

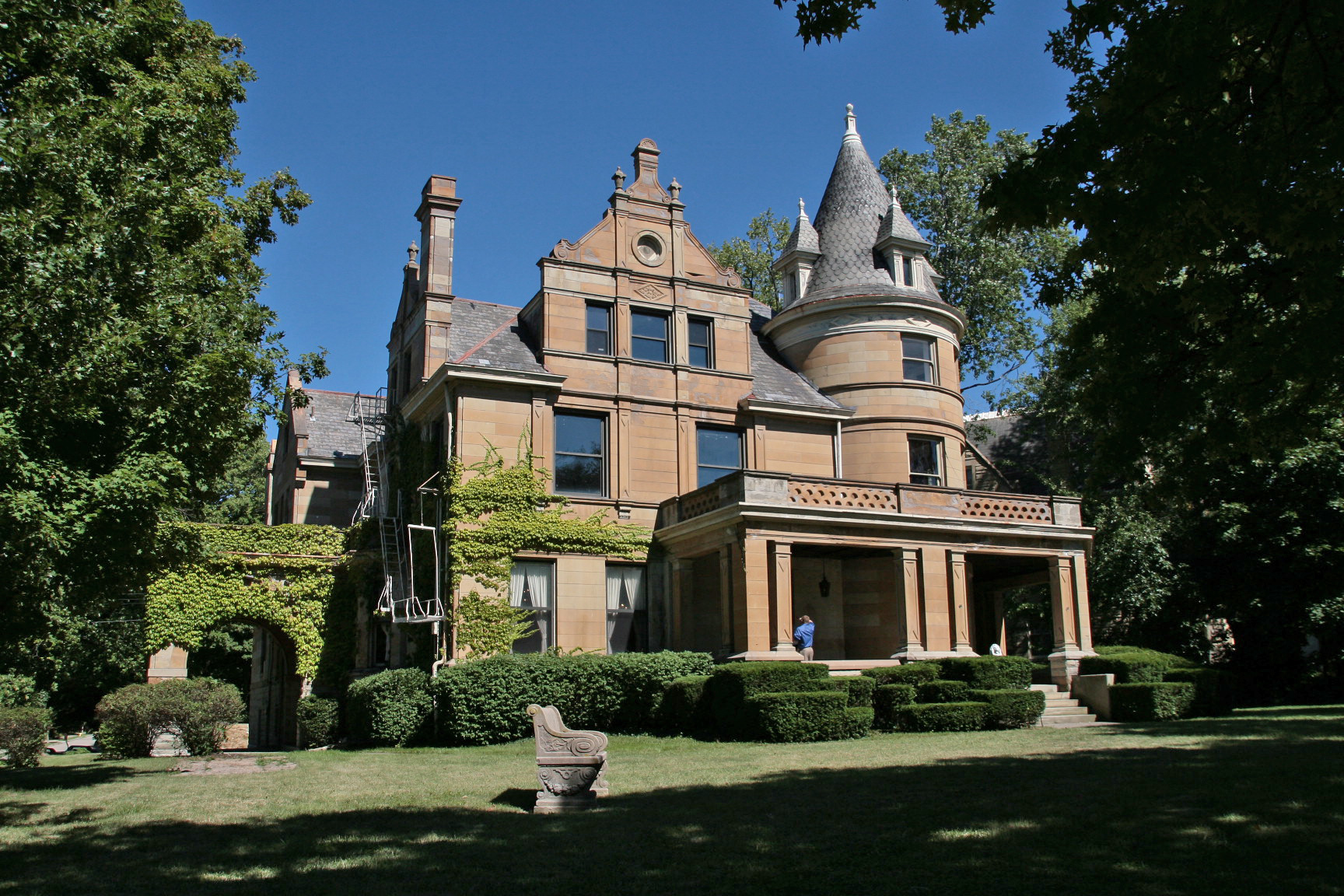
Cox's house

George Barnsedale Cox (1853–1916) was a political boss in Cincinnati, Ohio, United States, a member of the Republican Party, and associate of William Howard Taft.

== Early life ==
As a teen during the Civil War years, he supported his widowed mother as an errand boy. Later he drove a delivery wagon. Finally, he assisted his brother-in-law by operating the keno portion of the latter's casino. In these days he was already noted for being a physically strong and closed-mouthed man.

== Political career ==
He served most notably on the Decennial Equalization Board where he was able to fix the tax rate for prominent properties like the Shubert Theater, in which he became an investor. He also served significantly on the Board of Public Affairs in this turbulent era of the notorious Courthouse Riots.

Known as a ward boss who delivered his delegation as promised, he became the executive chairman of the local chapter of the Republican Party. He ran unsuccessfully for Hamilton County Clerk in 1884 and 1888, being the only candidate on his party's ticket to lose in the latter year. He managed James G. Blaine’s 1884 presidential campaign in Hamilton County. He set up the Young Men’s Blaine Club, which became his main base of political operations. Cox took pride in running an orderly organization. He maintained decorum in city conventions, eliminated multiple voting, and accepted the nomination and election of reform business candidates for mayor, who usually won election. Cox’s coalition was “able to bring positive government to Cincinnati and to mitigate the chaos which accompanied the emergence of the new city.” With some justification, Cox boasted of his “achievement of taking the schools, Police, and Fire Departments out of politics” and insisted that “a boss is not necessarily a public enemy.” On the other hand Lincoln Steffens, a famous muckraker, in 1905 called Cincinnati one of the two worst-governed cities in the country. William H. Taft made a speech against Cox in 1905, saying "the government under the machine is constantly described as a very corrupt one" which significantly damaged the Cox ticket. But Taft spoke in favor of Cox in 1908 when his political opponent Henry T. Hunt was up for election.

During his heyday, Cox had influence over all local newspapers save the Cincinnati Post. His chief lieutenants were Deputy County Treasurer Rud K. Hynicka and the President of the Board of the New Water works Commissioners, August Herrmann. Herrmann became President of the Cincinnati Reds from 1902 to 1927 and is known as the Father of the World Series. He influenced many local elections, including the nomination Julius Fleischmann, who became the youngest mayor of Cincinnati.

George Cox died after suffering a stroke in 1916.

== Legacy ==
The George B. Cox House at the corner of Brookline and Ludlow avenues was listed on the National Register of Historic Places on November 6, 1973. The Cox House has been converted into a branch of the Public Library of Cincinnati and Hamilton County.

Cox was the namesake of the George B. Cox Memorial Theater downtown on Seventh Street. Built in 1920, it closed in 1954 and was demolished in 1976.
