= Cincinnati riots of 1884 =

Riots over a court verdict in Cincinnati, Ohio

Cincinnati Courthouse riots
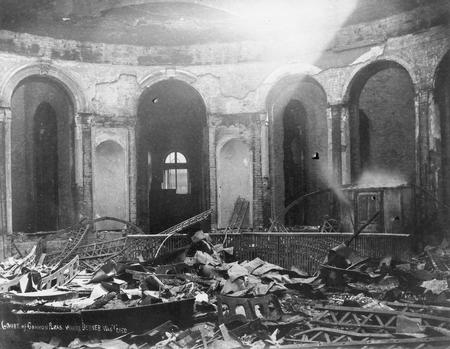
- The Cincinnati Courthouse shortly after the riots
- Date: March 28–30, 1884
- Location: Cincinnati, Ohio, U.S.
- Caused by: Public outrage over the decision of a jury to return a verdict of manslaughter in what was seen as a clear case of murder
- Methods: Rioting, protests, looting, arson, murder, assault
- Result: See Aftermath

Parties
| Ohio National Guard; Hamilton County Sheriff's Department; Cincinnati Police Department | Rioters |

Casualties and losses
| Ohio National Guard: 2 killed, 40 wounded Cincinnati Police: 1 killed, unknown wounded | Unknown |
- Total Casualties; 56 killed 300+ wounded

The Cincinnati riots of 1884, also known as the Cincinnati Courthouse riots, were caused by public outrage over the decision of a jury to return a verdict of manslaughter in what was seen by some as a clear case of murder. A mob in Cincinnati, Ohio, United States, attempted to find and lynch the perpetrator. In the violence that followed over the next few days, more than 50 people died and the courthouse was destroyed. It was one of the most destructive riots in American history. It comprised approximately 10,000 persons marching from Cincinnati Music Hall to the jail and Hamilton County Courthouse. In response to the violence, Ohio Governor George Hoadly ordered all members of the Ohio National Guard as well as all state-owned ammunition immediately to Cincinnati.

== Background ==
Cincinnati in the 1880s was an industrial city with a rising crime rate, due partly to general dissatisfaction with labor conditions. The Cincinnati police force had 300 men and 5 patrol wagons. In this period they arrested 50 people for murder, but only four were hanged. By January 1, 1884, there were 23 accused murderers in the jail.

Corruption was a serious problem in Cincinnati at that time, with local leaders notorious for controlling elections and manipulating judges and juries. In March 1884, the city was still reeling from a devastating flood the previous month when the river crested at 71.9 feet (21.9 m). A full-page article published in The Cincinnati Enquirer on March 9, 1884, said: "Laxity of laws gives the Queen City of the West its crimson record. Preeminence in art, science, and industry avail nothing where murder is rampant and the lives of citizens are unsafe even in broad daylight."

On December 24, 1883, a young white German named William Berner and his accomplice, Joe Palmer, a man of mixed African and European descent, robbed and murdered their employer, William Kirk, a livery stable owner in the West End of the city. The murderers dumped Kirk's body near the Mill Creek in the Northside district. After the men had been arrested, 500 potential jurymen were called before Berner's lawyer accepted the jury of twelve. After a prolonged trial, on March 26, 1884, the jury returned a manslaughter verdict despite the testimony of seven different people to whom Berner had admitted his premeditation and execution of the murder. The judge, who gave a sentence of 20 years in prison, called the verdict "a damned outrage". The next day, the newspapers called for a public meeting to condemn the verdict. Tried after Berner, Palmer was convicted and hanged. Palmer's hanging took place in the jailyard of Hamilton County, Ohio, the last execution to be carried out in Hamilton County after an 1885 law mandated that the Ohio State Penitentiary be the location of all executions.

An article in The New York Times, dated March 27, 1884, reported that James Bourne, one of the jurors, had spent the previous night at Bremen Street police station after being threatened by a mob. Returning home on the morning of March 27, a crowd threatened to hang him but was dispersed by the police. Later he was severely beaten and was again taken to the police station for his own safety. Another member of the jury, Charles Dollahan, was pelted with rotten eggs and dared not return home. Louis Havemeyer was told he was fired when he went to work. A crowd tore the blinds from the house of L. Phillips on Liberty Street, and threw dead cats and rotten eggs through the windows before discovering they had the wrong Phillips, not a member of the jury. The foreman of the jury, A. F. Shaw, went into hiding.

== Friday, March 28 ==
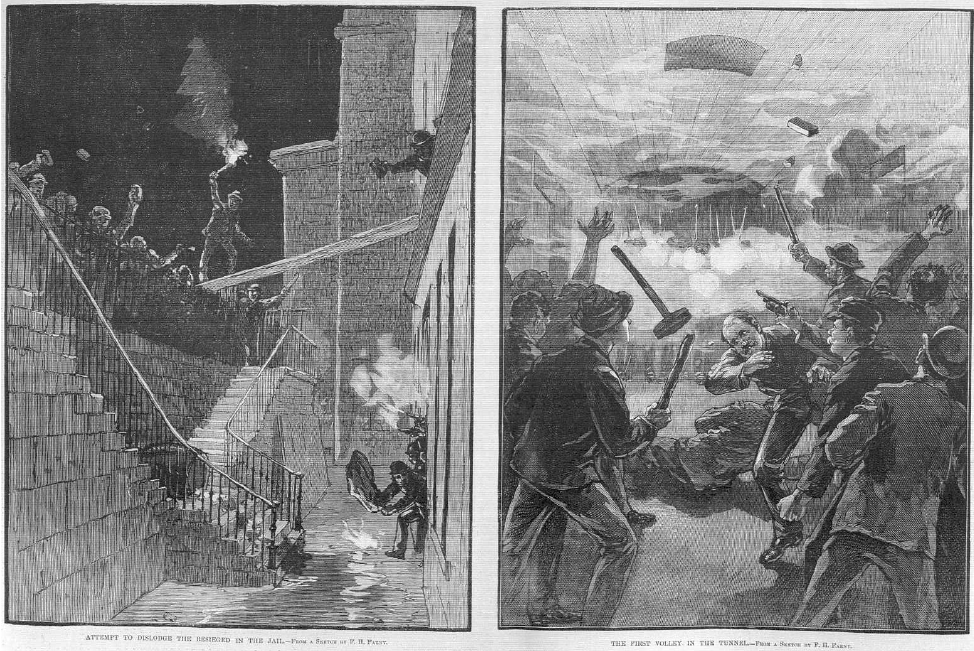
Illustrations of the 1884 Cincinnati riots from Harpers Weekly: Attempt to dislodge the besieged in the jail; the first volley in the tunnel.

Colonel C. B. Hunt, commanding the First Regiment of the Ohio Militia with 400 men, prepared for trouble, ordering sections from each company to stay on guard at their armory on Court Street, half a block from the courthouse. That evening, several thousand people attended a meeting at Music Hall in Over-the-Rhine to protest the lenient sentence. A large group of protesters then headed to the jail, apparently planning to lynch Berner. Unknown to the rioters, Berner had been sent to Columbus, Ohio, for his own safety, but had escaped en route.

Hamilton County Sheriff Morton Hawkins was also expecting trouble. He had thirteen deputies helping him guard the jail. The rioters managed to break into the jail through the sheriff's apartment, but left when they were shown that Berner was not present. More rioters then arrived. The sheriff had the alarms rung which had the unhelpful effect of drawing yet more people to the scene.

The mob, now 10,000 strong, pelted the jail with bricks and stones. They overcame resistance by the guards and police reinforcements and managed to break in again. They were driven out by reinforcements from the militia armory who entered the building through a tunnel from the courthouse. After one of the attackers was shot dead, the violence escalated. Rioters attempted to set the jail on fire using stolen kerosene. By the time the situation became temporarily under control late on Friday night, five people had died, including one police officer, and many more were wounded.

== Saturday, March 29 ==
The Cincinnati Enquirer supported the rioters in its Saturday morning edition, with a headline saying "At Last The People Are Aroused And Take The Law Into Their Own Hands, Enraged Community Rises In Its Might". The civic leaders, who had at first supported the vigilante action, became alarmed. They suspected that the mob was led by socialists and anarchists, the "dangerous classes". Although the Governor of Ohio, George Hoadly, was asked to call for reinforcements, he moved slowly and did not order the deployment of additional militia units until 5:00 pm on March 29.

Many of the guards failed to report for duty. Some of the 1st Regiment soldiers even participated in the riot. The out-of-town soldiers, who did obey orders, were unable to reach Cincinnati in time to prevent escalating violence by rioters who had been paid that day, and had spent their money in the bars.

During the day, the defenders of the jail erected barriers in the surrounding streets, improvised from vehicles, construction materials, grindstones and barrels of salt. The militia abandoned the armory and moved to the jail with all the arms and ammunition. The jail was now extremely crowded and ill-equipped to feed the occupants. Two to three hundred policemen were present, although they refused to play an active role in the fighting, as well as 117 local militiamen and the inmates of the jail.

In the evening, the mob gathered again in front of the courthouse and the jail. A gunfight broke out, lasting several hours. The crowd managed to set fire to the courthouse and blocked attempts by firemen to put out the blaze. The courthouse was destroyed. Rioters also started breaking into nearby stores. One store owner and his assistants shot three looters dead.

Eventually, reinforcements started to arrive by train. A force of 300 militiamen from Dayton met the crowd three blocks from the jail but then retreated back to the railway station. A more resolute force of 425 militiamen from Columbus arrived at around 11:00 pm armed with a Gatling gun, and managed to clear the streets around the jail and courthouse. However, fighting continued elsewhere in the city until 3:00 am.

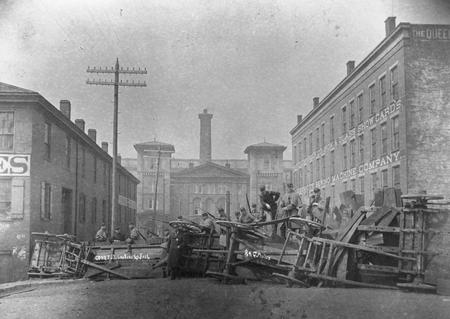
The first barricade, hastily built on Court Street

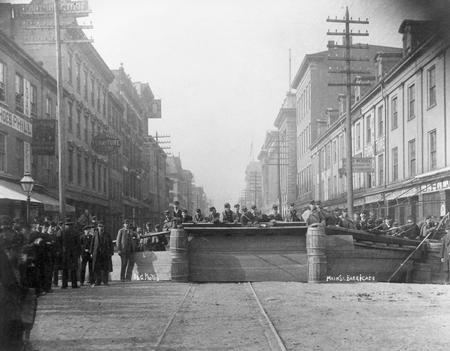
A more solid barricade on Main Street using construction materials from a nearby site

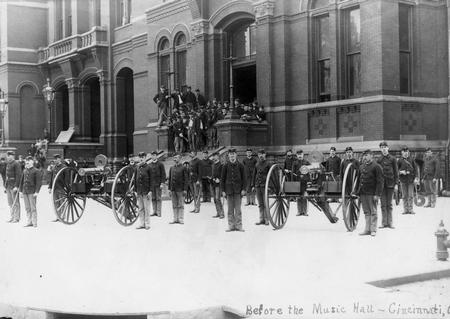
Troops outside the Music Hall after peace had returned

== Sunday, March 30 ==
In contrast to the previous day's edition, the Sunday morning edition of the Cincinnati Enquirer described "Fire and Fury, The Reign of Terror" and "Awful Scenes in Cincinnati". The riots resumed later on Sunday despite growing numbers of troops. There was one final assault on the militia. The Secretary of War, Robert Todd Lincoln, had called out U.S. troops. When they arrived, there was little for them to do apart from remaining on call in case of further trouble. The rioters had returned to work and calm had been restored. In the course of the riots, 56 people died and over 300 were wounded.

== Reactions ==
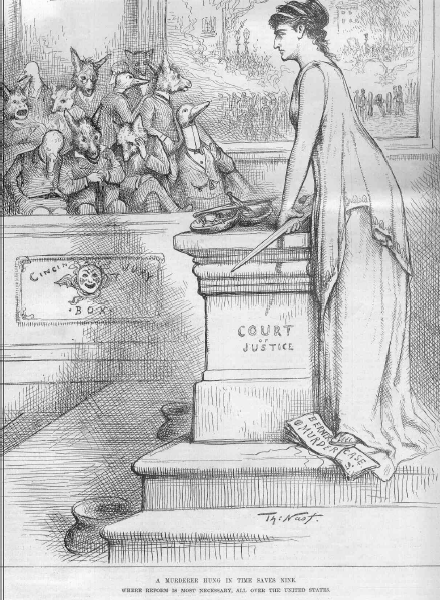
Cartoon on the case from Harpers Weekly. Caption: "A Murderer Hung in Time Saves Nine".

Some publications were sympathetic to the rioters. The Commercial Gazette published an editorial saying: "The time has come for taking an account for salvage for three days of destruction and terror. First, we have saved our jailful of murderers. We have killed 45 innocent men and wounded or maimed 45 more, all to save our jailful of murderers..." The editorial went on to describe the riots as a "just, popular impulse against the prostration of laws before criminals". On March 31, reporting on the return of calm, The New York Times said there was a general feeling that the militia was responsible for the deaths: their presence alone had excited the mob and they had been too ready to open fire.

An editorial in the London Spectator said, "For once we find ourselves sympathising with rioters". The editor of the Chautauquan said of the incident, "It tortures the conscience and the self-respect of honest men". The French author Victor Hugo even compared the riot to the storming of the Bastille, calling the rioters champions of justice and heroes.

Negative reactions included the Dayton Daily Democrat, which called the mob a "Commune" and Cincinnati "the Paris of America". Harper's Weekly blamed the riots on the fact that intelligent citizens had ceded politics to venal politicians. The paper called for stronger laws with "swift, sure and solemn" execution, and said that if middle-class Americans were running government instead of corrupt special interests, incidents like the riots would not occur.

== Aftermath ==
Berner, the original cause of the trouble, was recaptured late on Saturday afternoon. He had holed up in a house in the woods near Loveland, where he was found playing a game of cards. He was taken to the penitentiary in Columbus to serve his sentence. He was eventually paroled in 1895. After that, he left Cincinnati for Indiana and eventually died in 1941 at age 74.

The riots ended the régime of political bosses John R. McLean and Thomas C. Campbell. Campbell faced disbarment proceedings, with William Howard Taft as the junior prosecutor. However, the attempt failed, and Campbell left Cincinnati for New York.

A statue of John J. Desmond, a lawyer and captain of the militia who was shot dead while trying to protect the courthouse, stands in the lobby of the current courthouse.

== See also ==
- List of incidents of civil unrest in Cincinnati
- List of incidents of civil unrest in the United States
