= The Skyrocket =

1926 film by Marshall Neilan

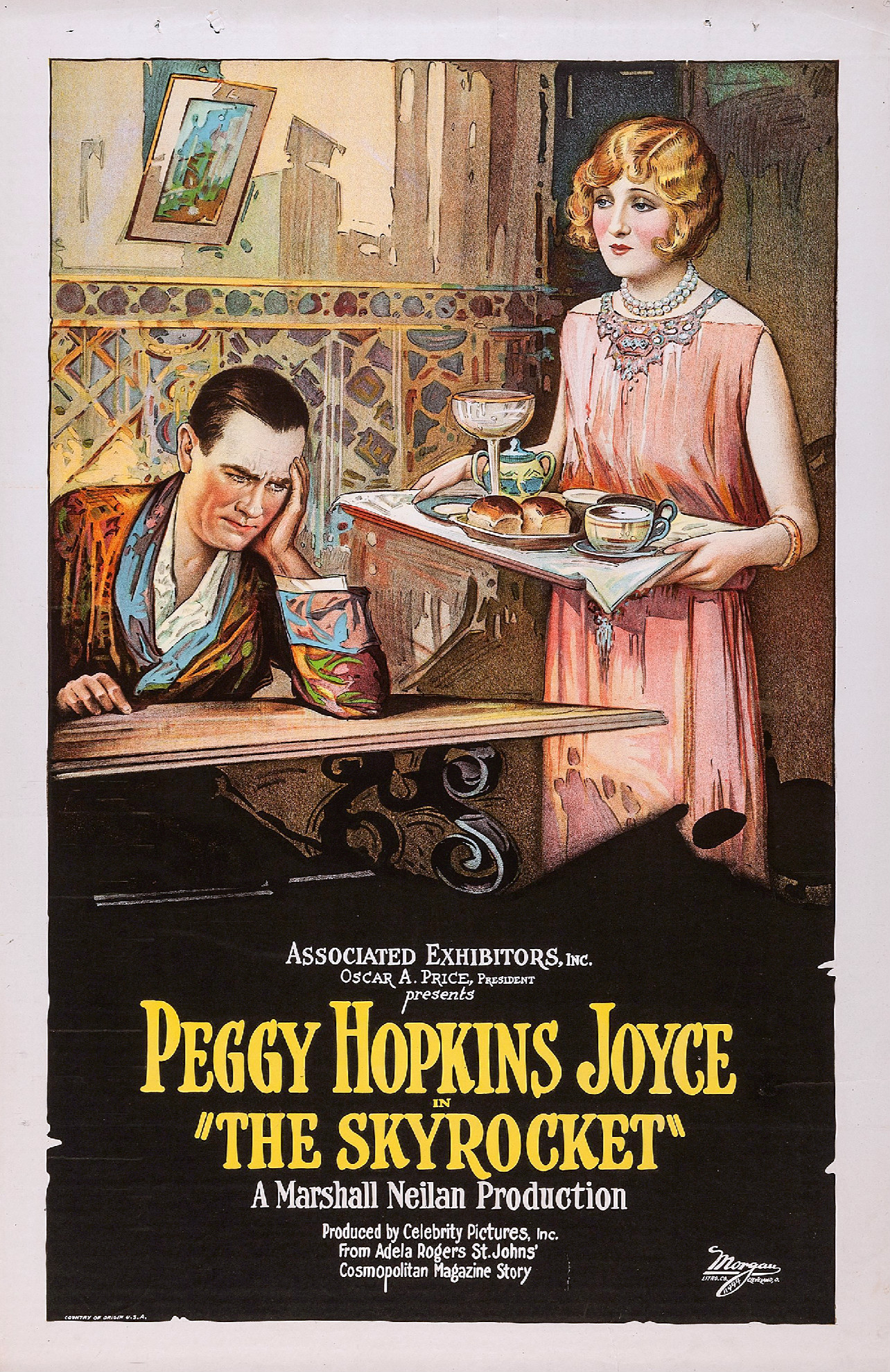
- Film poster
- Directed by: Marshall Neilan
- Written by: Benjamin Glazer (adaptation and scenario)
- Based on: The Skyrocket by Adela Rogers St. Johns
- Starring: Peggy Hopkins Joyce
- Cinematography: David Kesson
- Production company: Celebrity Pictures
- Distributed by: Associated Exhibitors
- Release date: February 14, 1926
- Running time: 80 min. (8 reels, 7350 ft.)
- Country: United States
- Language: Silent (English intertitles)

The Skyrocket is a 1926 American silent romantic drama film directed by Marshall Neilan and starring Peggy Hopkins Joyce. The film was based on the 1925 novel of the same name by Adela Rogers St. Johns and scripted by Benjamin Glazer.

== Plot ==
As described in a film magazine, young Sharon Kimm and Mickey live in the tenements and are childhood chums until they are separated. A few years later, Sharon becomes one of the bathing beauties on a comedy film lot, but because she attracts the director, the female star becomes jealous and causes her to be discharged. Dark days follow for her and Mickey, who is endeavoring to become a scenario writer. The young woman attracts the attention of a world-famed director and her career rises like a skyrocket to fame and position. Her love for her childhood chum Mickey is given a shock from the effects of flattery upon her as she acts like a star. At the height of her luxurious and exotic life, the skyrocket bursts and her film career comes to a sudden end. Through her suffering the real woman in her is reborn and true love bursts forth. There is a happy ending for Sharon, who has learned her lesson.

== Cast ==
- Gladys Brockwell as Rose Kimm (prologue)
- Charles West as Edward Kimm (prologue)
- Muriel McCormac as Sharon Kimm as a girl (prologue)
- Junior Coghlan as Mickey as a boy (prologue)
- Peggy Hopkins Joyce as Sharon Kimm
- Owen Moore as Mickey Reid
- Gladys Hulette as Lucia Morgan
- Paulette Duval as Mildred Rideout
- Lilyan Tashman as Ruby Wright
- Earle Williams as William Dvorak
- Bernard Randall as Sam Hertzfelt
- Sammy Cohen as Morris Pincus
- Bull Montana as Film Comedian
- Arnold Gray as Stanley Craig
- Ben Hall as Peter Stanton
- Nick Dandau as Vladmir Strogin
- Hank Mann as Comedy Producer
- Joan Standing as Sharon's Secretary
- Eugenie Besserer as Wardrobe Mistress
- Edward Dillon as the Comedy Director
- Hank Mann as the Comedy Producer

== Production ==
Director Marshall Neilan was announced by Photoplay as the director in July, 1925. Peggy Hopkins Joyce was a one-time Ziegfeld Follies showgirl who became a media figure in the late 1910s and early 1920s for dating, marrying, and divorcing wealthy men, acquiring a sizable collection of expensive jewelry and furs and wearing fashionable clothes. The Skyrocket was Joyce's first full-length feature and was intended as a vehicle to launch her acting career as she was largely known only for her colorful personal life. The film's distributor, Associated Exhibitors, launched a massive publicity campaign to promote the film. While Joyce earned mainly positive reviews for her performance, the film barely earned back its budget in box office returns. She would appear in only one more film, International House (1933), before fading into obscurity.

== Reception ==
Photoplay magazine called Joyce one of the six best performances of the month for its January, 1926 edition. They further noted that she was "the surprise of the picture".

== Preservation ==
No prints of The Skyrocket are located in any film archives, making it a lost film.

=== Gallery of stills ===
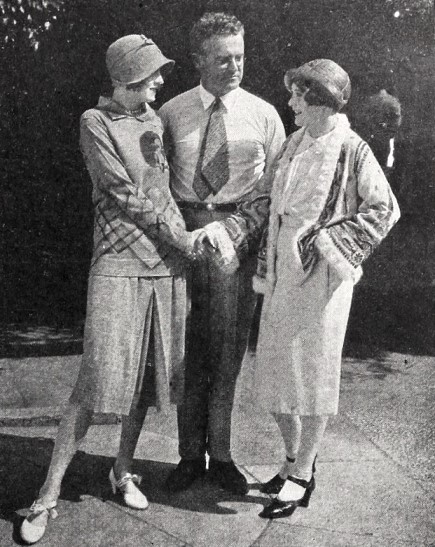

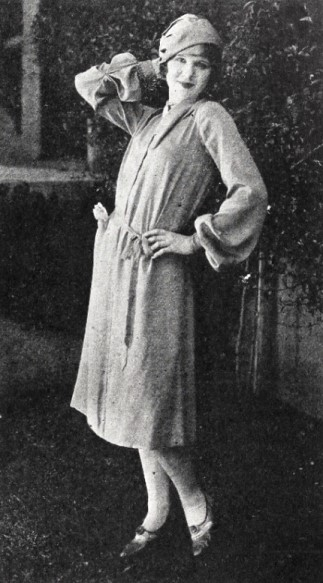

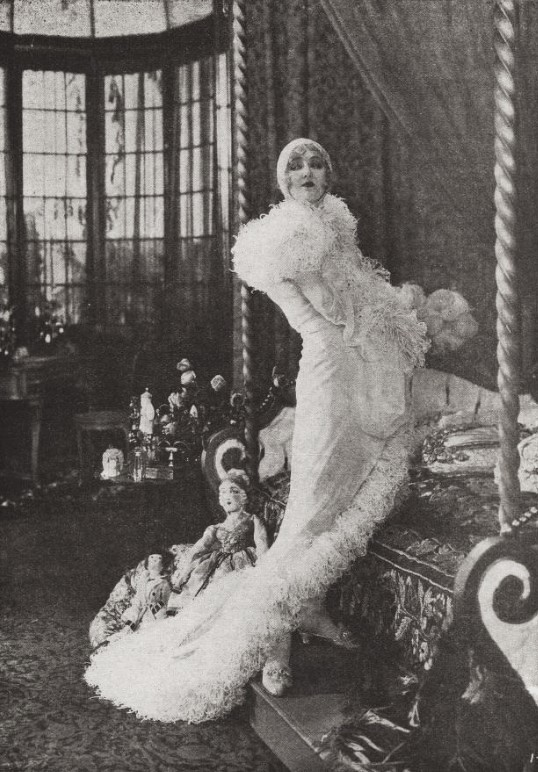

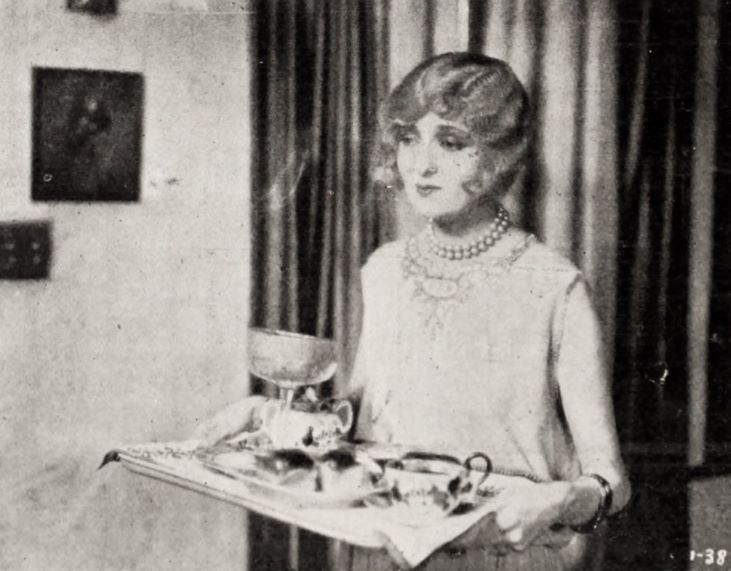

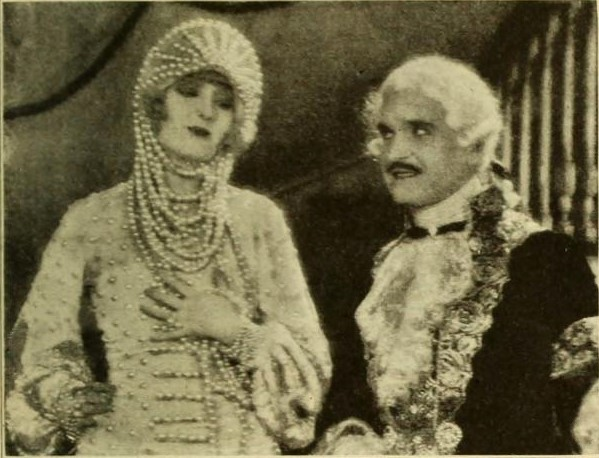

== See also ==
- Sennett Bathing Beauties
- List of lost films
