= Spanish Inquisition (disambiguation) =

The Spanish Inquisition was a Catholic ecclesiastical tribunal established in Spain in 1478.

Spanish Inquisition may also refer to:

- "The Spanish Inquisition" (Monty Python), a sketch by British comedy group Monty Python
- Spanish Inquisition Necklace, an emerald and diamond necklace owned by the Smithsonian Institution
- A weekly article in the metal music magazine Metal Hammer

== See also ==
- Inquisition (disambiguation)
