= Peggy Hopkins Joyce =

American actress, model and dancer (1893–1957)

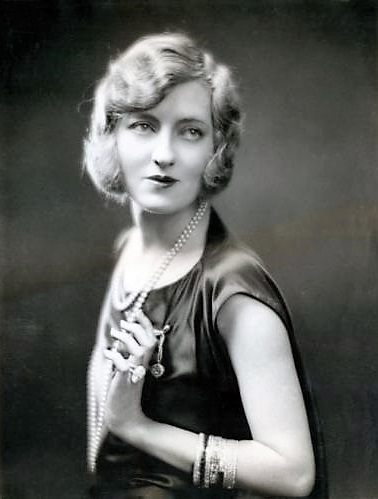
- Born: Emma Marguerite Upton; May 26, 1893; Berkley, Virginia, U.S.
- Died: June 12, 1957 (aged 64); New York City, U.S.
- Resting place: Gate of Heaven Cemetery
- Education: The Chevy Chase School for Girls
- Occupations: Actress, artist model, columnist, dancer
- Years active: 1916–1926
- Spouses: Everett Archer, Jr. (m. 1910–1910) Sherburne Hopkins (m. 1913; div. 1920) J. Stanley Joyce (m. 1920; div. 1921) Gustave Morner (m. 1924; div. 1926) Anthony Easton (m. 1945, divorced) Andrew Meyer (m. 1953)

Peggy Hopkins Joyce (born Emma Marguerite Upton; May 26, 1893 – June 12, 1957) was an American actress, artist's model, columnist, dancer and socialite. In addition to her performing career, Joyce was widely known for her flamboyant life, numerous engagements and affairs, six marriages, subsequent divorces, collections of diamonds and furs, and her lavish lifestyle.

== Early life ==
Born Marguerite Upton in 1893 in Berkley, Virginia (now part of Norfolk), she was known as Peggy. Upton left home at the age of 15 with a vaudeville bicyclist. While the two were en route to Denver, Colorado, via train, she met millionaire Everett Archer Jr. She dumped the bicyclist and in 1910 married Archer. Archer had the marriage annulled after six months when he discovered Joyce was underage. Joyce later claimed she divorced Archer because the life of a millionaire's wife "was not at all what I thought it would be, and I was bored to death." Using the settlement money she received from Archer, Joyce attended the private Chevy Chase School for Girls in Washington D.C., where she met Sherburne Hopkins. Hopkins was a lawyer and son of a prominent, wealthy lawyer. They were married on September 1, 1913.

Joyce left Hopkins in 1917 to pursue a career in show business in New York City. They eventually divorced in January 1920.

== Career ==
Joyce made her Broadway debut in 1917 in the Ziegfeld Follies, followed by an appearance in the Shuberts' A Sleepless Night. She later had an affair with producer Lee Shubert for a time.

In 1920, she married her third husband, millionaire lumberman J. Stanley Joyce, and took his name. The newly married Mrs. Joyce drew attention for a $1 million shopping spree over the course of a week's time. By 1922, Joyce's romantic escapades had made her one of the most written-about women in the American press. She granted any interview, sometimes receiving reporters in her bedroom while wearing a sheer negligee, sans undergarments. Cole Porter and Irving Berlin both used her name in their lyrics, The New Yorker magazine ran cartoons mentioning her, and comedians of the time such as Will Rogers, Eddie Cantor and Frank Fay could get a laugh by invoking her reputation. Be Yourself!, a 1930 American Pre-Code musical comedy film, gets a laugh by invoking her reputation.

Due to her notoriety, Joyce caused a sensation with her performance in the 1923 installment of the annual Earl Carroll's Vanities. She appeared in her second film, The Skyrocket (1926), which provoked the Wisconsin state legislature into introducing a bill to allow censorship of all movies entering the state. In any event, the film was a box office failure. In 1930, Joyce published a ghostwritten, "tell-all" book reputedly taken from her steamy diary entries. Men, Marriage and Me advised, "True love was a heavy diamond bracelet, preferably one that arrived with its price tag intact."

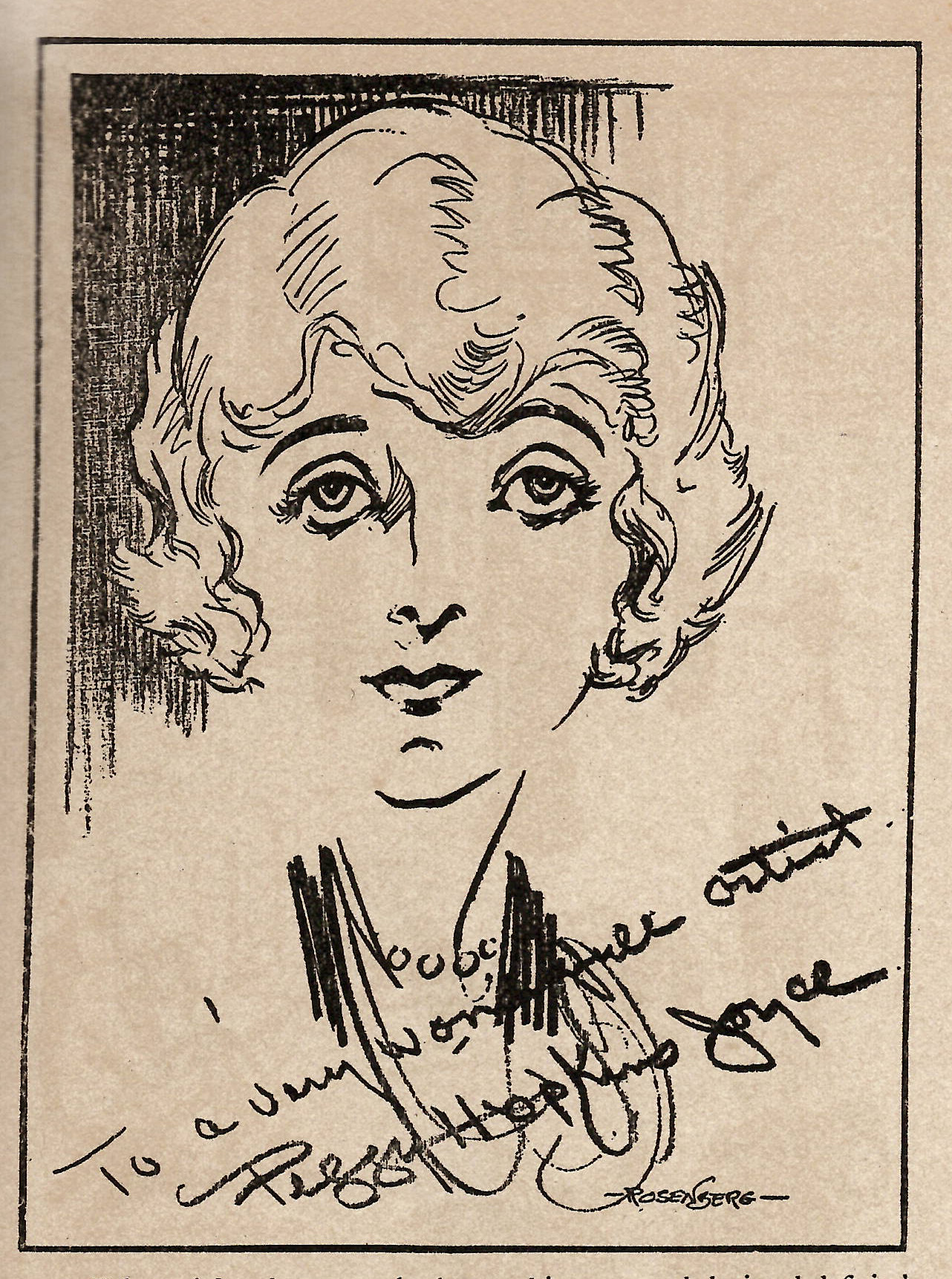
Signed drawing of Peggy Hopkins Joyce by Manuel Rosenberg for the Cincinnati Post 1924

In 1933, Joyce played herself in the ramshackle film, International House, which contained some good-natured joshing about her love life.

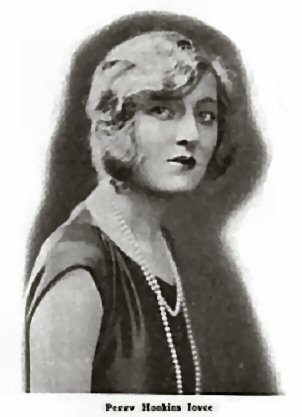
Peggy Hopkins Joyce (c. 1922)

Joyce owned a jewel known as the Portuguese Diamond, one of the most expensive in the world, which she sold to Harry Winston. It is displayed at the Smithsonian Institution in Washington, D.C.

Recounting a meeting with Joyce in the late 1920s, Harpo Marx claimed that she was illiterate. But, she was credited with writing a column in the early 1930s for the spicy New York publication Varieties (not to be confused with the show business trade publication Variety). The column reported gossip about the hijinks and goings-on of public figures in both New York and London.

== Personal life ==
=== Marriages and affairs ===
Joyce was married six times and claimed to be engaged around fifty times.

Joyce's first marriage was to millionaire Everett Archer Jr. in 1910. Archer had the marriage annulled later that year after he discovered that Joyce was underage. Her second marriage was to lawyer Sherburne Hopkins, the son of a prominent and wealthy lawyer. They were married in 1913. In 1917, Joyce left him to pursue a career. While travelling with the Ziegfeld show in 1919, she met wealthy Chicago lumberman J. Stanley Joyce. J. Stanley paid for Peggy's divorce from Hopkins; the divorce was granted on January 21, 1920.

Two days later, on January 23, Peggy and Stanley were married. On their wedding night, Peggy locked herself in the bathroom of the couple's hotel room and refused to come out until Stanley wrote her a check for $500,000. Within the year, she left Stanley for Parisian playboy and multimillionaire newspaper owner Henri Letellier. She sued Stanley for divorce and asked for $10,000 a month in alimony and attorney fees of $100,000. Stanley counter sued, claiming that she had married him only to defraud him of money. He also accused Peggy of having multiple adulterous affairs, being a bigamist (he claimed that Peggy was not divorced from her first husband before she married her second, thus making their union invalid), and for having driven a United States Army lieutenant to suicide. Stanley's lawyer claimed the man shot himself in a Turkish bath after going broke trying to keep Peggy happy.

During the couple's well publicized divorce trial in 1921, testimony revealed that J. Stanley had given Peggy a reported $1.4 million in jewelry, a $300,000 home in Miami, furs, cars, and other properties during their marriage. Peggy was awarded $600,000 in the divorce settlement. She was also allowed to keep all the jewelry she had acquired during the marriage, and was given stock in J. Stanley Joyce's lumber company that allotted her an annuity of $1,500 monthly for life.

The media later reported that Peggy Joyce had eloped with Henri Letellier, but the two never married. She later said that she did not marry him because "Frenchmen understand women too well. A girl should never marry a man who understands women." After her third divorce, Joyce declared that she never would marry again.

For the next few years, Joyce remained single but continued to have numerous affairs with such wealthy men as W. Averell Harriman, Prince Christopher of Greece and Denmark, Hiram Bloomingdale (son of Lyman G. Bloomingdale), Sayajirao Gaekwad III, Charlie Chaplin (who based part of his film A Woman of Paris on stories Joyce told him about her previous marriage), and film producer Irving Thalberg.

In 1922, Joyce's affair with the attaché of the Chilean Legation, Guillermo "William" Errázuriz, drew media attention as he was the brother of the equally scandalous Blanca Errázuriz. The affair began while she was still in a relationship with Henri Letellier. Errázuriz was married with a child, but Joyce claimed he wanted to marry her. On May 1, 1922, Errázuriz shot himself in Joyce's Paris hotel room and died the following day. Joyce claimed that he committed suicide after she refused to marry him. Errázuriz's family claimed that he killed himself due to financial problems.

Three days after Errázuriz's death, on May 4, Joyce was hospitalized after accidentally overdosing on sleeping pills. While she was recuperating, she gave an interview to a reporter claiming that she was "...through with men." Joyce went on to say that she was in love with William Errázuriz but admitted that she "...played with him. I dangled him on a string just as I did many others. Oh, why did I do it?" When asked why numerous men were seemingly fascinated by her, Joyce stated, "I don't know why men run after me. I cannot tell you the secret of my fascination. [...] I never meant to ruin their lives." Nine days after Errázuriz's death, another attaché of the Chilean Legation linked to Joyce, Lt. Rivas Muntt, attempted suicide by overdosing on Veronal. Muntt reportedly became despondent when Joyce spurned his advances and was found clutching a newspaper clipping of the interview in which Joyce declared her love for Errázuriz.

Despite her declaration never to marry again, Joyce married Swedish Count Gösta Mörner on June 3, 1924. Joyce told the press that "All my other marriages meant nothing. This is the first time I have ever been truly in love." Count Mörner told reporters that Joyce gave up her career in order to be his wife. By the end of July 1924, Joyce had decided to resume her career and left Count Mörner. They divorced in February 1926. Joyce remained single for the next nineteen years but continued dating several wealthy men. In the early 1930s, she began an affair with Walter Chrysler, who was married at the time. Chrysler reportedly gave her $2 million in jewelry (including a 134-karat diamond necklace which cost a reported $500,000) and two Isotta Fraschinis – a canary yellow roadster and a Tipo 8B – worth $45,000. Joyce later had a relationship with British astronomy professor Charles Vivian Jackson. Jackson died in a sleighing accident when the couple were in St. Moritz in 1937. Joyce later claimed that Jackson was "the only man I ever loved."

On December 3, 1945, Joyce married for the fifth time to consulting engineer Anthony Easton. The marriage made headlines when Joyce refused to include the word "obey" in the marriage vows. Although there is no record of a divorce, their union ended sometime before 1953.

In 1953, Joyce married for the sixth and final time to Andrew C. Meyer. Meyer was described as a "retired official of the Bankers Trust Company". Meyer was actually a retired bank teller whom Joyce had met while he was working at a bank that she used. They remained married until Joyce's death in 1957.

== Later years and death ==
After marrying her sixth husband in 1953, Joyce moved to Woodbury, Connecticut, where she spent her remaining years. On June 1, 1957, she was admitted to Memorial Hospital for Cancer and Allied Diseases in New York City after being diagnosed with throat cancer. Joyce died there on June 12, 1957, at the age of 64.

Joyce is buried at Gate of Heaven Cemetery in Hawthorne, New York.

== References in pop culture ==
Her name was frequently incorporated into song lyrics of the 1920s and 1930s to invoke images of excess and "naughtiness". Cole Porter regularly referenced her:

- In "Why Shouldn't I?" (from Jubilee), referring to love, the Princess sings "Miss Peggy Joyce says it's good, and every star out in far Hollywood seems to give it a try, so why shouldn't I?"
- In "They Couldn't Compare to You" (from Out of This World), the god Mercury sings of his affairs with women real and fictional through history: "...When betwixt Nell Gwyn/And Anne Boleyn/I was forced to make my choice/I became so confused/I was even amused/And abused by Peggy Joyce..."
- "Which" asks, "Should I make one man my choice/and regard divorce as treason/or should I like Peggy Joyce/have a new one every season?"
- "Let's Not Talk About Love" from 1941's Let's Face It!, Maggie Watson sings, "I've always said men were simply deevine/(Did you know that Peggy Joyce was once a pupil of mine?)"

In songs by others:

- "I've Got Five Dollars" by Richard Rodgers and Lorenz Hart includes: "Peggy Joyce has a business/All her husbands have gold..."
- In the Gus Kahn-Walter Donaldson song, “Makin' Whoopee”, popularised by Eddie Cantor, he sung: "Take Peggy Joyce/With little voice/She soon became the nation's choice!/I tell you, buddy/She's made a study/Of makin' whoopee."

Zora Neale Hurston refers to Peggy Hopkins Joyce in her essay "How It Feels to Be Colored Me". Hurston compares her own positive self-image to Joyce as "aristocratic" and declared that Joyce has "nothing on me."

In the 1925 novel Gentlemen Prefer Blondes, Anita Loos wrote "And all of we girls remember the time when he was in the Ritz for luncheon and he met a gentleman friend of his and the gentleman friend had Peggy Hopkins Joyce to luncheon and he introduced Peggy Hopkins Joyce to Mr. Spoffard and Mr. Spoffard turned on his heels and walked away. Because Mr. Spoffard is a very very famous Prespyterian [sic] and he is really much too Prespyterian to meet Peggy Hopkins Joyce."

Arthur Train referred to her in his 1930 Wall Street novel Paper Profits. Under the name of "Miss Boyce", she gives vapid sex lectures on the topic of "Why You *Should* Marry", and wiggles her torso a lot---it is meant to show the wild side of life in the 1920s before the great Stock Market Crash of 1929.

In D.W. Griffith's final film, The Struggle (1931), which is about prohibition, characters are in a restaurant drinking beer and talking about current events. "Time for the democrats," one says. "I see Peggy Joyce is married again," says another. The same dialogue is repeated in a later dance hall scene.

In the 1932 film Two Seconds, there are two references to Peggy Joyce. Bud Clark (Preston Foster) is setting up John Allen (Edward G Robinson) with a blind date. Bud: "She's got class, works in a laundry" John: "Well I hope she's got class" Bud: "Hey listen remember now, I aint promisin ya no Peggy Joyce". Later, Bud to John: "While we go chasing around tryin a find a Peggy Joyce for ya, what do you do? You go out and get yaself hog-tied to a dance hall dame."

In the 1934 film Change of Heart, James Dunn rebuffs the advances of Ginger Rogers by saying, "Peggy Joyce is after me! (straightening his tie) and that's only one."

In the 1934 film Strictly Dynamite, Jimmy Durante sings a song called "I'm Putty In Your Hands" with Lupe Velez. Its lyrics (written by Durante and Harold Adamson) include the lines "At every dinner party...I'm the ladies' choice! I hold...my own with Harlow, Garbo...and even Peggy Joyce!"

In Damon Runyon's short story "The Lily of St Pierre", when the narrator criticizes the quality of the hostesses in Good Time Charley Bernstein's speakeasies, Charley "admits that I may be right, but he says that it is very difficult to get any Peggy Joyces for 25 bobs per week." And in "Sense of Humour", Joe the Joker relates how he "imitates a doll’s voice, and tells Mindy he is Peggy Joyce, or somebody, and orders fifty dozen sandwiches".

== Selected filmography ==
- The Turmoil (1916)
- The Skyrocket (1926) *lost film
- International House (1933)
