= Harry Winston =

American jeweler (1896–1978)

- Born: Harry Weinstein; March 1, 1896; New York City, U.S.
- Died: December 8, 1978 (aged 82); New York City, U.S.
- Occupation: Jeweler
- Years active: 1908–1978
- Known for: Harry Winston, Inc.
- Spouses: Edna Fleischman (m. 1933)
- Children: 2
- Relatives: Stephanie Winston Wolkoff (step granddaughter); Randall Batinkoff (step grandson)

Harry Winston (né Weinstein; March 1, 1896 – December 8, 1978) was an American jeweler. He donated the Hope Diamond to the Smithsonian Institution in 1958 after owning it for a decade. He also traded the Portuguese Diamond to the Smithsonian in 1963 in exchange for 3,800 carats of small diamonds.

Winston founded Harry Winston, Inc. in New York City in 1932. He was called by many the "King of Diamonds".

== History ==
Winston's father Jacob Weinstein started a small jewelry business. He and Winston's mother were Jewish immigrants to the United States from the Russian Empire. While growing up, Harry worked in his father's shop. When he was twelve years old, he recognized a two-carat emerald in a pawn shop, bought it for 25 cents, and sold it two days later for $800. Winston started his business in 1920, the same year he changed his name from Weinstein, and opened his first store in New York City in 1932.

Winston's jewelry empire began in 1926, with his acquisition of Arabella Huntington's jewelry collection, for $1.2 million. The wife of railroad magnate Henry E. Huntington, Arabella amassed one of the world's most prestigious collections of jewelry, largely from Parisian jewelers, such as Cartier. When Winston bought the collection after her death, the designs of the jewelry in the collection were quite old fashioned. Winston redesigned the jewelry into more contemporary styles and showcased his unique skill at jewelry crafting.

When he died, Winston left the company to his two sons, Ronald and Bruce, who then entered into a decade-long battle over the control of the company. In 2000, Ronald along with new business partner, Fenway Partners, bought Bruce out from the company for $54.1 million.

On March 26, 2013, Harry Winston, Inc., was bought by the Swatch Group of Switzerland for $1 billion.

== Legacy ==
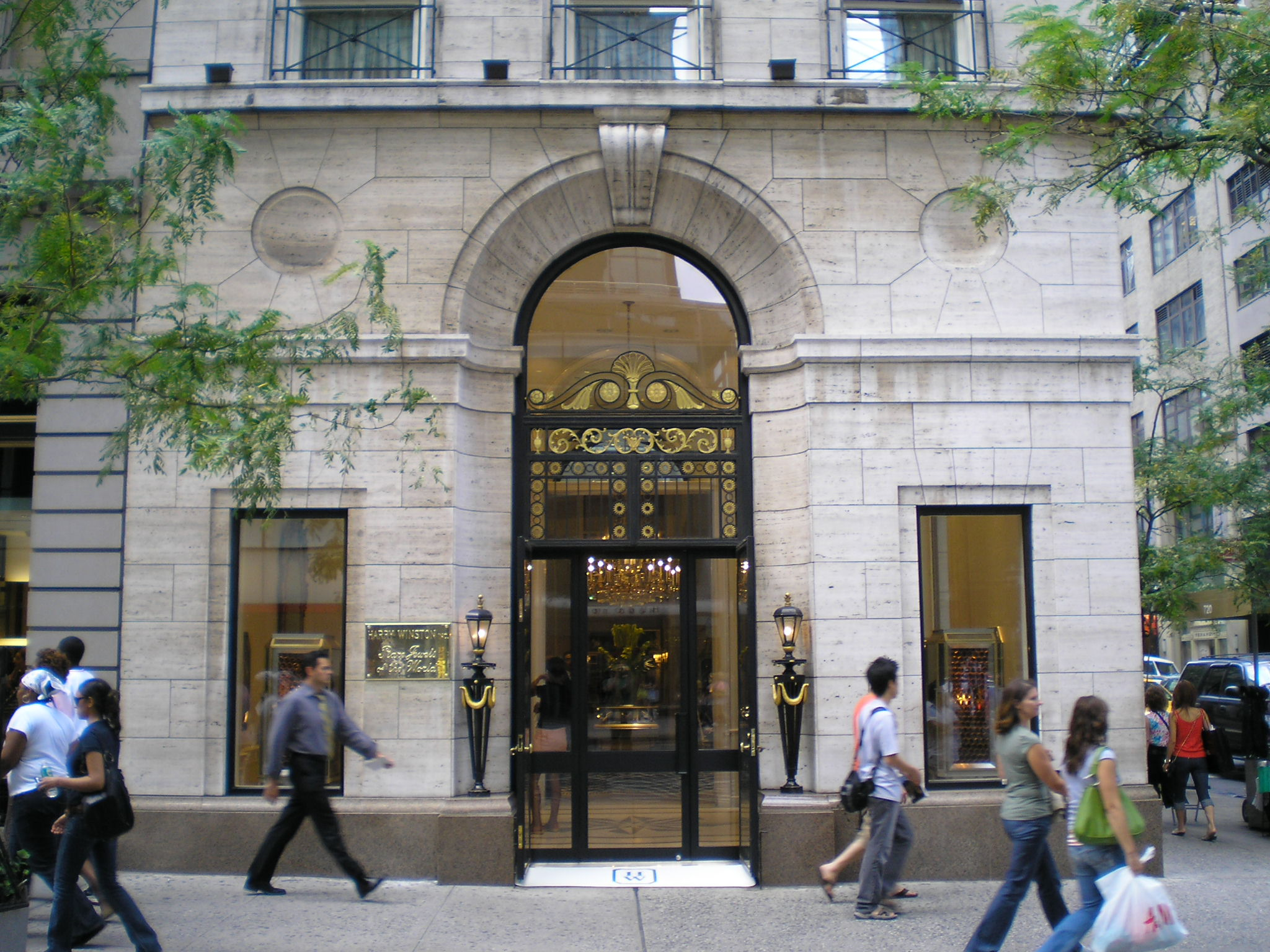
Harry Winston Jewelers, Fifth Avenue, Manhattan

Winston was among the most noted jewelers in the world, well known to the general public. In the 1953 musical film Gentlemen Prefer Blondes, the song "Diamonds Are a Girl's Best Friend" includes the spoken interjection "Talk to me, Harry Winston, tell me all about it!" The Lauren Weisberger comic novel Chasing Harry Winston was published in May 2008. Mariah Carey's song 'Mi' off her 16th studio album Here for It All likewise contains a reference to the jeweller in its description of "Harry Winston diamonds and some Louis XIII"

Winston's influence extended significantly into Hollywood and the world of celebrity. In 1944, he pioneered the practice of lending jewelry to actresses for the Academy Awards and other events, beginning with Jennifer Jones. This tradition continued with numerous Hollywood stars wearing Harry Winston jewels at high-profile events, including Katharine Hepburn, who wore the 15th century Inquisition Necklace in 1947. Winston's creations appeared in Alfred Hitchcock's Notorious (1946) and other notable films, such as The Graduate (1967) and Everyone Says I Love You (1996).

In 2015, Harry Winston, Inc., operated 39 salons and numerous retail affiliates in such locations as New York, Beverly Hills, Las Vegas, Dallas, Honolulu, Bal Harbour, Chicago, Costa Mesa, and other countries around the world.

== Noted diamonds Winston owned ==
=== A–C ===
- The Arcots, first 33.70 and 23.65 carats (6.740 and 4.730 g; 0.2377 and 0.1668 oz), recut by Winston to 31.01 and 18.85 carats (6.202 and 3.770 g; 0.2188 and 0.1330 oz), respectively. Originally the stones were thought to be a match, but when Winston bought them, removed them from their settings and discovered they were not, he decided to recut them slightly to improve their clarity and brilliance. Both were either colorless or near-colorless, and antique pear-shaped brilliants.
- The Anastasia, three emerald cuts weighing 42.95, 30.90 and 22.88 carats (8.590, 6.180 and 4.576 g; 0.3030, 0.2180 and 0.1614 oz), all D color and Flawless clarity. Cut from a rough crystal weighing 307.30 carats (61.460 g; 2.1679 oz) Winston had purchased in 1972, largest gem named after Anastasia Nikolaevna, daughter of Tsar Nicholas II.
- The Ashoka, originally a 42.47-carat (8.494 g; 0.2996 oz), colorless, modified elongated cushion brilliant. Purchased by Winston from a Chinese dealer in 1947; subsequently sold and repurchased several times by the firm. Stone was recut slightly in 1977 from its original weight of 42.47 carats (8.494 g; 0.2996 oz) before it was sold again as a ring.
- The Blue Heart, a 30.82-carat (6.164 g; 0.2174 oz), blue, heart-shaped brilliant. After the cut was made, Cartier sold it to the Unzue family of Argentina in 1910. It reappeared in Paris in 1953 where it was purchased by an important European titled family, then purchased by Harry Winston in 1959. Winston mounted it in a ring and sold it to Marjorie Merriweather Post, who later donated it to the Smithsonian Institution.
- The Briolette of India, a 90.38-carat (18.076 g; 0.6376 oz), colorless, briolette cut.
- The Cornflower Blue, 31.93 carats (6.386 g; 0.2253 oz) pear brilliant; 12.39 carats (2.478 g; 0.0874 oz) round brilliant, blue, cut from 158 carats (31.6 g; 1.11 oz) South African rough which Winston purchased in 1958. The larger stone was sold in 1969 as the pendant for a diamond necklace. Winston repurchased it two years later, then sold it to a Middle Eastern client. The round brilliant was set as a ring and sold in 1969. In 1987 the pear brilliant was auctioned in Geneva, Switzerland.
- The Countess Széchényi, a 62.05-carat (12.410 g; 0.4377 oz), D color, pear-shaped brilliant. Purchased by Winston in 1959 from namesake and recut to a flawless 59.38 carats (11.876 g; 0.4189 oz). Sold to an American industrialist in 1966.
- The Crown of Charlemagne, a 37.05-carat (7.410 g; 0.2614 oz), sky blue, Old European cut brilliant.

=== D–I ===
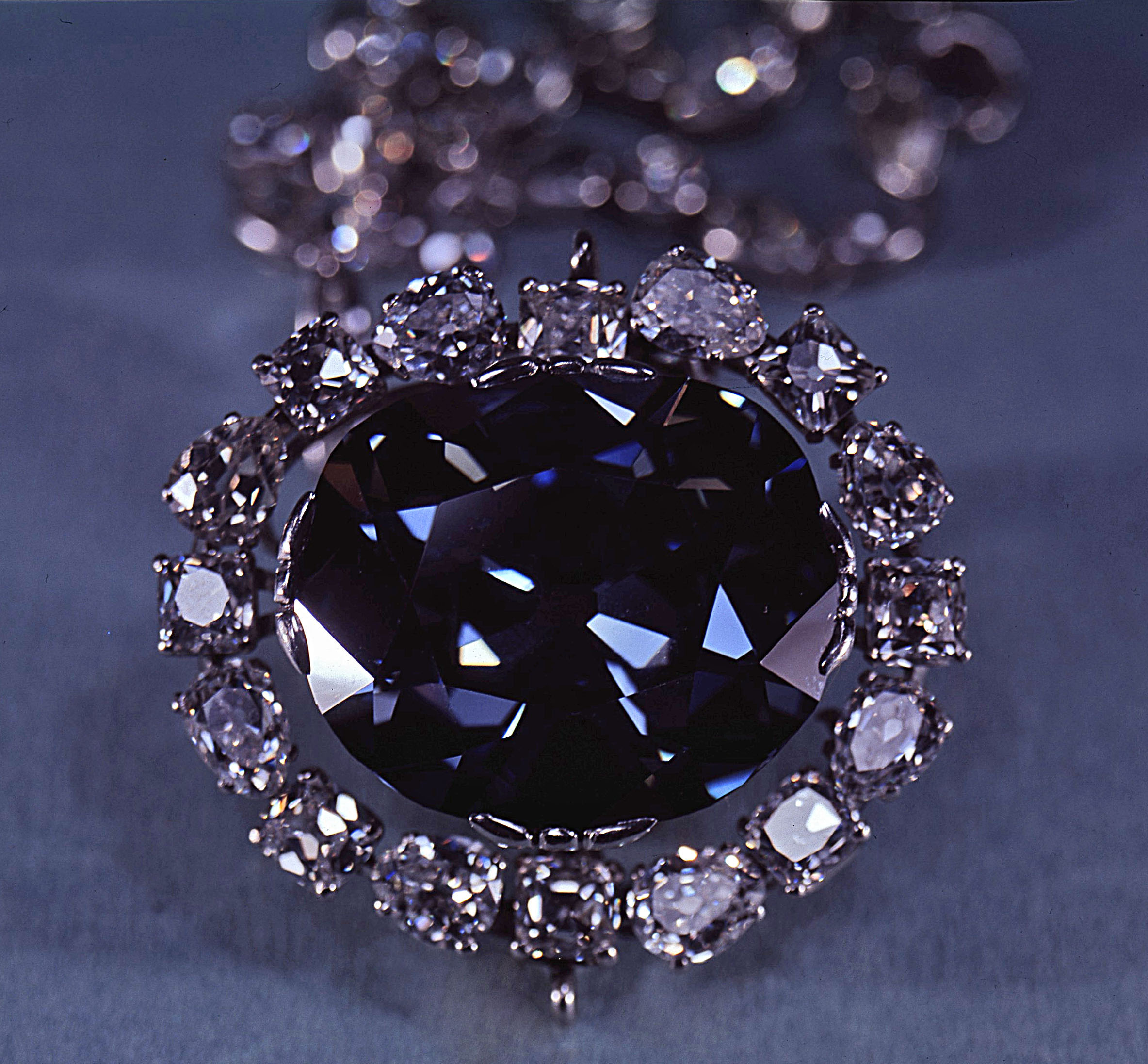
The Hope Diamond

- The Deal Sweetener, a 45.31-carat (9.062 g; 0.3197 oz) diamond plus four smaller stones, D color and Flawless, emerald cut. In 1974 Winston bought a large parcel of diamonds worth $24,500,000—at that time the largest individual sale of diamonds in history. Harry Oppenheimer, head of De Beers Consolidated Mines Ltd., arranged the transaction. When Winston asked Oppenheimer, "How about a little something to sweeten the deal?" Harry Oppenheimer pulled a 181-carat (36.2 g; 1.28 oz) rough diamond out of his pocket and rolled it across the table. Winston picked up the stone, smiled, and said simply, "Thanks." It was cut into five gems, the largest being named the Deal Sweetener. Other gems cut from the crystal: An emerald cut of 24.67 carats (4.934 g; 0.1740 oz), plus three pear shapes of 10.80, 4.19 and 1.45 carats (0.290 g; 0.0102 oz), respectively. All were sold that same year.
- The Deepdene, a 104.52-carat (20.904 g; 0.7374 oz), yellow, antique cushion brilliant. Purchased by Winston in 1954 from Cary W. Bok, then sold the following year to Eleanor Loder from Canada. Resurfaced in 1971 and put up for auction at Christie's in Geneva. This stone is also the largest known diamond to receive irradiation treatment, which improved its color.
- The Étoile du Désert, a 50.67-carat (10.134 g; 0.3575 oz), D-color, pear-shaped brilliant. Acquired by Winston in 1977 and mounted in a diamond necklace. Sold the same year to a Saudi Arabian prince. The necklace contained over 250 carats (50 g; 1.8 oz) of diamonds, among them a 16-carat (3.2 g; 0.11 oz) D-color Flawless clarity marquise cut.
- The Graff Pink of 24.78 carats, graded Fancy Intense Pink colour and with a November 2010 Sotheby's auction pre-sale estimate price of US$27 million to US$38 million (£17 million to £24 million). Sotheby's sold the rare pink diamond ring for $46.16 million to London jeweler Laurence Graff.
- The Hope, a 45.52-carat (9.104 g; 0.3211 oz), Fancy Dark Grayish-Blue, antique cushion brilliant. He bought this diamond in 1949 and later donated it to Smithsonian in 1958. He sent the diamond to the museum via a registered first-class mail. The package in which he sent the Hope diamond is found among the Smithsonian's collection.
- The Idol's Eye, a 70.20-carat (14.040 g; 0.4952 oz), Light Blue, semi-triangular modified antique brilliant. Allegedly first seen in 1607 when the East India Company seized the stone from its owner, a Persian prince named Ragab, as payment for debts. Resurfaced in 1906 in the possession of Sultan Abdul Hamid II. The stone, along with the Hope Diamond and Star of the East, were stolen from the Sultan by his messenger and sold to French pawn shops. The stones were intended to provide a comfortable retirement for the Sultan. Appeared at the June 1909 auction held in Paris by gem dealer and collector Selim Habib, where it was purchased by a Spanish nobleman. It then came into the possession of a London bank and eventually was bought by a Dutch diamond dealer, from whom Winston purchased the stone in November 1946. Winston sold the diamond in 1947 to May Bonfils Stanton, daughter of the publisher and co-founder of The Denver Post. It was mounted as the center stone in a diamond necklace with eighty-six other diamonds totalling 35 carats (7.0 g; 0.25 oz). In 1963, after Bonfils Stanton's death, the gem was sold at auction in New York City. Renowned jeweler Lawrence Graff of London also owned the stone.
- The Indore Pears, 46.95 and 46.70 carats (9.390 and 9.340 g; 0.3312 and 0.3295 oz) but later recut to 44.62 and 44.18 carats (8.924 and 8.836 g; 0.3148 and 0.3117 oz) respectively, colorless, both pear-shaped antique brilliants. Originally owned by Maharaja Tukojirao Holkar III who was forced to abdicate due to a scandal in 1926. Despite his abdication he remained very wealthy and retained the diamonds. He married American Nancy Anne Miller in 1928 amid much international publicity. Miller converted to Hinduism and after marrying was known as Maharani Shamista Devi Holkar. Winston purchased the two diamonds in 1946 from the former maharaja and his wife, both of whom had worn the stones on many occasions. The gems were recut to 44.62 and 44.18 carats (8.924 and 8.836 g; 0.3148 and 0.3117 oz) and were featured as his 'Court of Jewels' exhibit. Winston sold the gems in 1953 to a client from Philadelphia and repurchased them in 1958. They were then sold to a New York client and were once again purchased in 1976 and sold to a member of a royal family. In 1981 and again in 1987, the two noted diamonds were sold at auction in Geneva.
- The Isadora Diamond, an 80-carat (16 g; 0.56 oz) yellow diamond worth $5–6 million, first worn by Whoopi Goldberg at the 74th Academy Awards, then later worn by Kate Hudson and Liliane Montevecchi in the 2003 film How to Lose a Guy in 10 Days. In the film, it's called the "Isadora Diamond", named after Isadora Duncan. The necklace was sold shortly after filming finished.

=== J–M ===
- The Jonker, twelve gems, the largest weighing 125.35 carats (25.070 g; 0.8843 oz), colorless, various shapes. Discovered as a 726-carat (145.2 g; 5.12 oz) rough crystal in January 1934 and purchased by Winston from the Diamond Producers Association in London in 1935. It was the first time a major diamond crystal was cleaved in the United States. The largest diamond, the Jonker I, was a 142.90-carat (28.580 g; 1.0081 oz) emerald cut, but it was recut in 1937 to 125.35 carats (25.070 g; 0.8843 oz) to give it a more oblong outline. Winston is said to have loved the stone and refused to sell it for many years, using it instead for display at various charitable exhibitions, set in a platinum necklace with 110 baguette-cut diamonds. He sold the gem in 1951 to King Farouk of Egypt, who went into exile the following year, taking the gem with him. It was unheard of until 1959 when it was rumored that Queen Ratna of Nepal had been seen wearing it. It was later confirmed that Farouk did indeed sell the diamond to Nepal for a reported price of $100,000. It was later sold in 1974 at a Hong Kong auction for $4 million. A marquise shape and ten emerald cuts comprise the other diamonds cut from the crystal, the larger gems included emerald cuts of 41.30 (known as the Jonker II), 35.45 (Jonker III), 30.70 (Jonker IV), 25.66 (Jonker V) and 24.41 (Jonker VI) carats. Jonkers IV and VI were sold to American clients while the other three were sold to Indian maharajas. The smallest Jonker satellite stone, Jonker XII, a 5.30-carat (1.060 g; 0.0374 oz) emerald cut, was auctioned in New York in October 1975.
- The Lesotho, eighteen different diamonds, pale brown, various shapes. The diamond was discovered by Ernestine Ramaboa in May 1967 at the Letseng-la-Terai diggings in Lesotho. The crystal was sold at auction in Maseru to a South African dealer who then sold it to a European dealer. It was later purchased in Geneva by Winston. In 1969, he had it cut into eighteen stones totalling 242.50 carats (48.500 g; 1.7108 oz). The largest three gems were a 71.73-carat (14.346 g; 0.5060 oz) emerald-cut, a 60.67-carat (12.134 g; 0.4280 oz) emerald cut, and a 40.42-carat (8.084 g; 0.2852 oz) marquise brilliant, named Lesotho I, II and III, respectively. The 40 carats (8.0 g; 0.28 oz) marquise was bought by Aristotle Onassis for his wife, Jacqueline Kennedy Onassis. The gem was sold at her estate sale auction for over $2 million.
- The Liberator, four gems weighing 38.88, 18.12, 8.93 and 1.44 carats (7.776, 3.624, 1.786 and 0.288 g; 0.2743, 0.1278, 0.0630 and 0.0102 oz), D color, three emerald cuts and a marquise, respectively. Winston purchased the 155 carats (31.0 g; 1.09 oz) Venezuelan crystal in 1943 and cut four stones from it. The three smaller gems were set in a clip and the largest was mounted in a ring and sold to the forementioned Mrs. May Bonfils Stanton, in 1946. In 1962 Winston reacquired the diamond from Mrs. Stanton's estate and had it recut from its original weight of 39.80 carats (7.960 g; 0.2808 oz) down to 38.88 carats (7.776 g; 0.2743 oz). He sold it to an American client in 1966, who sold it at auction in New York on December 7, 1972.
- The Louis XIV, a 58.60-carat (11.720 g; 0.4134 oz), D color and Flawless clarity, antique pear-shaped brilliant. Reportedly the gem belonged to King Louis XIV but nothing of its history before Harry Winston bought it can be verified. Winston purchased the diamond in 1958 from the estate of Chrysler heiress Thelma Chrysler Foy. He then had it recut from 62.00 carats (12.400 g; 0.4374 oz) down to a flawless 58.60 carats (11.720 g; 0.4134 oz). He also obtained a 151-carat (30.2 g; 1.07 oz) oval sapphire from the Foy estate. In 1959 the diamond was mounted as the center stone in a tiara that also contained six smaller pear-shaped diamonds totalling 22 carats (4.4 g; 0.16 oz), and 233 smaller diamonds totalling 120 carats (24 g; 0.85 oz). The diamond was exhibited at the Louvre in 1962, along with the Hope Diamond, as part of the Ten Centuries of French Jewelry exhibition. In 1963 it was removed from the tiara and sold together with the 61.80 carats (12.360 g; 0.4360 oz) Winston Diamond to Eleanor Loder from Canada, who wore the two stones in a pair of earrings. The Louis XIV was sold again in Geneva in 1981 from Loder's estate.
- The Mabel Boll, a 44.76-carat (8.952 g; 0.3158 oz), near colorless, elongated emerald-cut. The diamond originally weighed 46.57 carats (9.314 g; 0.3285 oz) and was owned by Mabel Boll, the much-married American socialite whose name was often in the news in the 1920s. Boll collected nicknames like she collected jewelry: in 1921 she was hailed by newspapers as "Broadway's most beautiful blonde." She married Colombian coffee king Hernando Rocha in 1922, who presented her with a million dollars' worth of jewelry, mostly in the form of diamonds. The press referred to her as the "$250,000-a-day bride." She gained her most last nickname, "Queen of Diamonds", because she often appeared in public wearing all her jewelry. It was said that the rings she wore on her left hand alone were worth more than $400,000 ($8 million in 2025 dollars). When she died in 1949 Winston purchased the large emerald-cut diamond. According to Boll, the stone had originally been bought from Tiffany & Co. Winston slightly recut the stone, which measured 1 3/8 by 5/8 inch (35 by 16 mm), reducing it to 45.67 carats (9.134 g; 0.3222 oz) and set it in a ring. It was then featured in his Court of Jewels exhibition before being sold to a New York client in 1954. When the client died in 1965, Winston reacquired the diamond to a flawless 44.76 carats (8.952 g; 0.3158 oz), and sold it the following year to a European client. At this time it was designed to be worn as a ring or as the center stone to a bracelet set with an addition 112 smaller emerald-cut diamonds totaling 65.96 carats (13.192 g; 0.4653 oz).
- The McLean Diamond, a 31.26-carat (6.252 g; 0.2205 oz), blue-white colorless, antique cushion brilliant. The diamond was purchased by Harry Winston from the estate of Evalyn Walsh McLean along with other pieces of jewelry including the Hope Diamond and the Star of the East. He sold the McLean Diamond to the Duke and Duchess of Windsor in 1950. The Duchess, a collector of jewelry, wore the stone often and owned it until her death in 1986. It was sold at her estate sale auction in April 1987 for $3.15 million.

=== N–Z ===
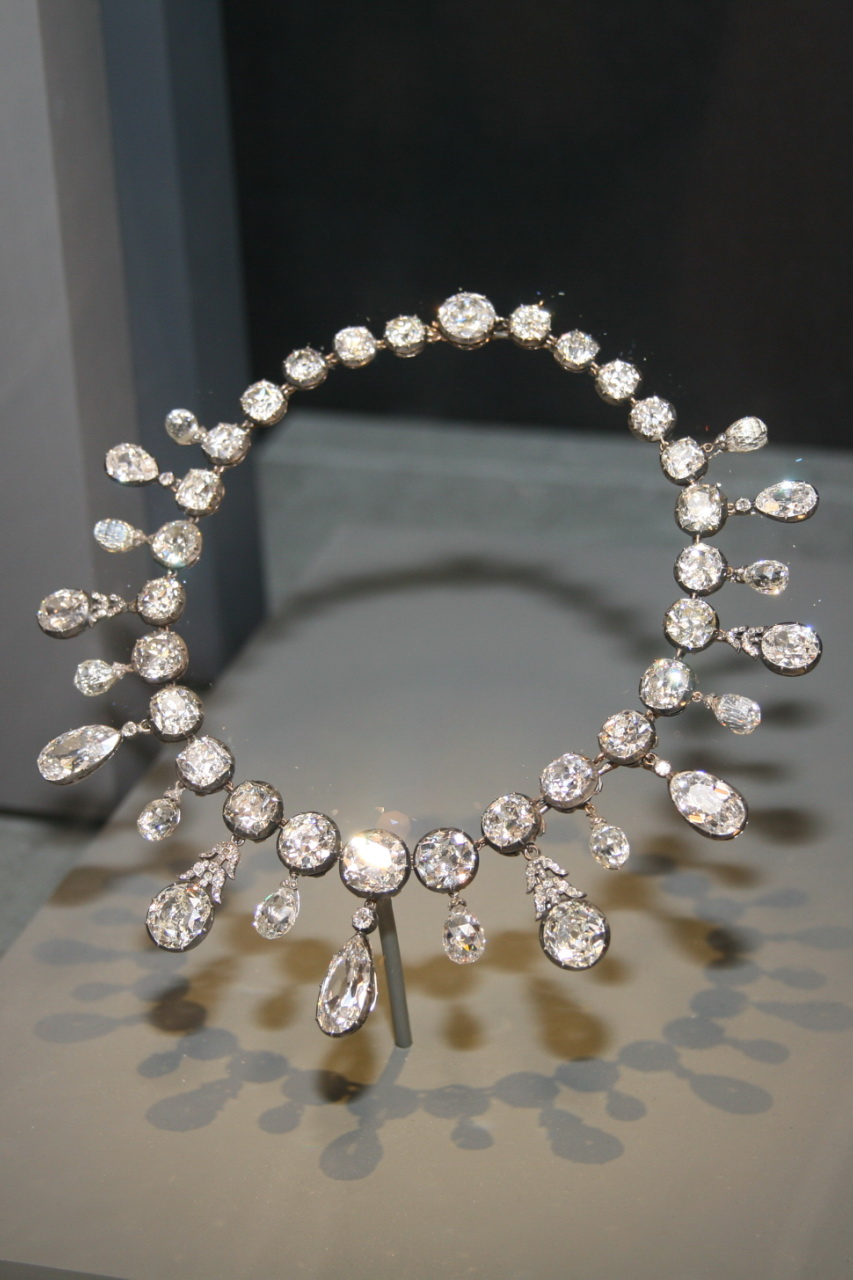
Napoleon Diamond Necklace

- Napoleon Diamond Necklace, various stones, colorless, antique cushion brilliants, pear-shaped antique cushion brilliants, briolette cuts. The forty-seven diamonds in this necklace weigh a total of 275 carats (55.0 g; 1.94 oz). Napoleon gave it to his wife, Empress Marie-Louise, a Habsburg princess, to celebrate the birth of their son in March 1811. When Marie-Louise died in 1847 the necklace passed to her nephew's wife, Archduchess Sophie. Sophie left it to her third son, Archduke Karl Ludwig, upon her death in 1872. Karl Ludwig's grandson, Franz Joseph II, Prince of Liechtenstein, sold the necklace to French collector in 1948. Harry Winston bought the piece in 1960 and sold it to Marjorie Merriweather Post two years later. Post willed the necklace to the Smithsonian Institution, which received it in 1973.
- The Nassak, a 43.38-carat (8.676 g; 0.3060 oz), colorless, emerald cut. The Nassak has an Indian origin. It was originally a triangular 90 carats (18 g; 0.63 oz) Mogul-cut stone, similar in appearance to the Taj-I-Mah Diamond. The stone was supposedly set as the eye of an idol of the god Shiva. After the Third Anglo-Maratha War in 1817–18, the diamond was seized by the Governor-General, Lord Hastings, and became part of the loot taken from India. Named the Nassak, it was sent to England. It was purchased at auction by crown jewelers Rundell and Bridge in 1831 during a period of severe economic depression. They had the stone recut to 80.59 carats (16.118 g; 0.5685 oz) to give it greater brilliance, and in the process it became a triangular brilliant with lots of extra pavilion facets. In 1837, it was sold at auction to the Marquess of Westminster (he also bought the Arcots Diamonds and the King George IV Diamond at the same time). The Marquess mounted it in the hilt of his dress sword. The diamond remained in the Westminster family for nearly a century. In the 1920s, it was sold to a Parisian jeweler, who brought it to America in 1926 for display. The stone later returned to Paris where it was bought by Winston in 1940, who had the stone recut to its present flawless 43.38 carats (8.676 g; 0.3060 oz) emerald cut shape. He then sold it to a New York jewelry firm in 1942. Mrs. William B. Leeds of New York purchased the gem in 1944 and wore it in a ring. It was sold at auction in New York in 1970.
- The Nepal, a 79.41-carat (15.882 g; 0.5602 oz), colorless, pear-shaped antique brilliant. Not much is known about this gem. It is thought to be a Golconda diamond and was owned by Jang Bahadur, the Prime Minister of Nepal, in the late 19th century and remained in the hands of Nepalese royalty until the mid-20th century. Winston purchased the diamond from an Indian dealer in 1957. At this time he had it slightly recut from its original 79.50 carats (15.900 g; 0.5609 oz) weight. It was set in a pendant/brooch combination and was featured in an article on diamonds and gems in the April 1958 issue of National Geographic magazine and then exhibited at London's "Ageless Diamond" exhibition the following year. That same year, the stone was sold to the Family Perfillon-Bertarelli as the pendant to a v-shaped diamond necklace that also contained 145 round brilliants weighing a total of 71.44 carats (14.288 g; 0.5040 oz).
- The Niarchos, a 128.25-carat (25.650 g), D color and Flawless clarity, pear-shaped brilliant. The gem was discovered as a 427-carat (85.4 g; 3.01 oz) crystal at the Premier Mine in South Africa, in 1954. In 1956, it was sold to Winston as part of an $8.4 million parcel. The largest gem cut from it was a 128.25-carat (25.650 g; 0.9048 oz) pear-shaped diamond. The same year it was purchased by Stavros Niarchos, Greek shipbuilder and industrialist, whose name it currently bears. Also cut from the rough were a 27.62-carat (5.524 g; 0.1949 oz) marquise and a 40-carat (8.0 g; 0.28 oz) emerald cut. They were also purchased by Niarchos.
- The Oppenheimer, a 253.70-carat (50.740 g; 1.7898 oz), light yellow, uncut crystal. The Oppenheimer was discovered in 1964 at the Dutoitspan Mine near Kimberley, South Africa. The stone is noted for being extraordinarily well-formed. Winston purchased the gem the same year it was found and donated it to the Smithsonian Institution in memory of Sir Ernest Oppenheimer, chairman of the board of De Beers Consolidated Mines Ltd from 1929 until 1957.
- The Porter Rhodes, a 53-carat (10.6 g; 0.37 oz), colorless, Asscher cut.
- The Portuguese, a 127.01-carat (25.402 g; 0.8960 oz), faint yellow with strong blue fluorescence, antique emerald cut.
- The Qamar-I-Sultana, a 44-carat (8.8 g; 0.31 oz), colorless, marquise cut.
- Queen Marie of Roumania sapphire, a 478.68 carat cushion cut from Sri Lanka. Set and reset by Cartier in the early 1900s, it forms a drop pendant. When sold in 2003, it was the largest sapphire ever sold at auction.
- Spanish Inquisition Necklace, a diamond and emerald-studded necklace, which was named so by Winston. It was acquired from Yashwant Rao Holkar II, the Maharaja of Indore in 1947 and then sold to Cora Hubbard Williams in 1955
- Star of the East, a 94.78-carat, pear-shaped, D-color stone of VS2 clarity grade, which Winston purchased from the estate of Evalyn Walsh McLean.
- The Vargas Diamond, a 726.6-carat (145.32 g; 5.126 oz) uncut diamond which was later cut into 29 stones under Harry's direction.

== See also ==
- Harry Winston, Inc.
- Dominion Diamond Corporation
