= Star of the East (diamond) =

Large diamond, probably from Ottoman Empire

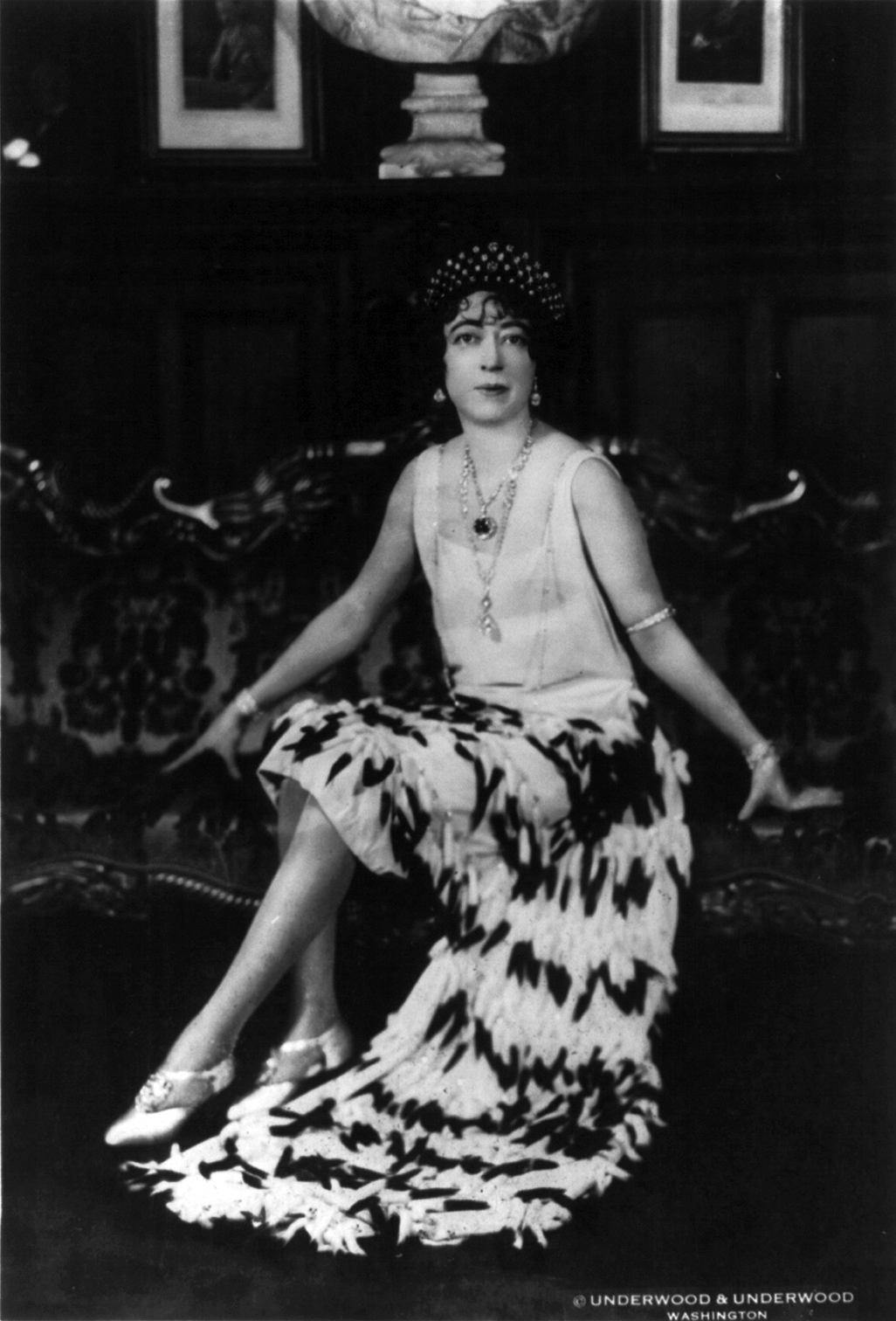
- Evalyn Walsh McLean wearing the Hope Diamond (top) and the Star of the East (bottom)
- Type of stone: Diamond
- Weight: 94.78-carat
- Color: D-color
- Cut: Pear
- Country of origin: Turkey (presumed)
- Mine of origin: Unknown
- Discovered: Unknown
- Cut by: Unknown
- Original owner: The Star of the East Diamond was part of the collection of jewels belonging to the Ottoman Sultan, Abdul Hamid II, who ruled between 1876 and 1909. The exact circumstances under which the diamond came into the possession of the Sultan are not known. Even the origin of the name and at what point in its history it was named, remains a mystery. Owners include Evalyn Walsh McLean and Harry Winston
- Owner: The Ottoman Sultan, Abdulhamid II
- Estimated value: Unknown

The "Star of the East" is a 94.78-carat, pear-shaped, D-color stone of VS2 clarity grade. Its exact origin is unknown, but it likely originated from India. The Star of the East diamond was part of the collection of jewels belonging to the Ottoman Sultan, Abdul Hamid II, who ruled between 1876 and 1909. The Star of the East was stolen from Sultan Abdul Hamid II. The exact circumstances under which the diamond came into the possession of the Sultan are not known. Even the origin of the name and at what point in its history it was named remain a mystery. It was later acquired by Pierre Cartier, who sold it to Evalyn Walsh McLean. After McLean's death, Harry Winston purchased the diamond together with McLean's entire collection. The diamond's current whereabouts are unknown.

== History ==
The Star of the East's exact origin is unknown, but it likely originated from one of the five groups of mines that were situated on the eastern side of the Deccan Plateau in Southern and Central India. The stone first surfaced in the collection of the Sultan Abdul Hamid. It was later acquired by Pierre C. Cartier. In 1908, Evelyn Walsh McLean purchased the stone for $120,000 from Cartier while on a honeymoon with her husband Edward Beale McLean. The Star of the East then remained in McLean's hands for about 40 years until her death. According to an article in the Southern Inspired Magazine, McLean died wearing the Star of the East and her more famous stone: the Hope Diamond. After her death, the Star of the East and the Hope Diamond were sold to Harry Winston, an American jeweler later known for donating the Hope Diamond to the Smithsonian Institution.

Winston sold the Star of the East to King Farouk of Egypt, but never received payment for it. Several years after King Farouk's overthrow in 1952, the Egyptian government recognized Winston's claim, and the stone was eventually returned to him. At a later time, the Star of the East was displayed at the Museum of Modern Art, New York, at a reception marking the 50th anniversary of Harry Winston, Inc. The Star of the East's present whereabouts are unknown.

== Known changes over time ==
Date acquired	Owner	Change in setting	Value when sold	Notes
Unknown	Sultan Abdul Hamid	Weighed 94.80 carats.		It is disputed whether the Sultan owned it.
19th Century	Pierre Cartier	reset to appeal to Evalyn McLean.	$180,000; $200,000	Conflicting estimates of sales price.
1908	Edward Beale McLean and Evalyn Walsh McLean		$120,000	Entire McLean collection sold to Winston.
1947	Harry Winston		$1,000,000	New York City jeweler; bought the Hope Diamond as well.
1951	King Farouk of Egypt		Returned for failure to pay.	Winston never received payment.
1952	Harry Winston		Unknown	Winston claimed back the un-paid-for stone. Took a few years to actually get returned.
1969	Unknown private collector		Unknown	Was displayed in the Modern Museum of Modern Art in a celebration commemorating 50 years to Harry Winston Inc.
1984	Harry Winston			Whereabouts unknown since.

== Confusion with the Ahmedabad diamond ==
An article about Harry Winston appeared in the 1983 Spring issue of Gems & Gemology magazine. In the section about the Star of the East, the magazine Stated:

The Star of the East is believed to have been originally the Ahmedabad, a 157.25-ct rough diamond purchased in India in the mid-17th century by Tavernier, the French gem merchant. He later had it cut to a 94.78-ct pear shape and reportedly disposed of it in Persia. It then resurfaced in the 19th century in the possession of Sultan Abdul Hamid II of Turkey, who also owned the Hope diamond. (Krashes, 1983).

Since the stones are both pear-shaped, D-color, believed to be of Indian origin, similar in weight, and have some unknown whereabouts, it is easy to understand why they were confused one for another. However, the confusion was resolved in November 1995 when the real Ahmedabad was offered for sale at Christie's in Geneva, and later bought by Robert Mouawad for $4,324,554.

== See also ==
- List of diamonds
