= Portuguese Diamond =

25.402 g, octagonal-cut diamond

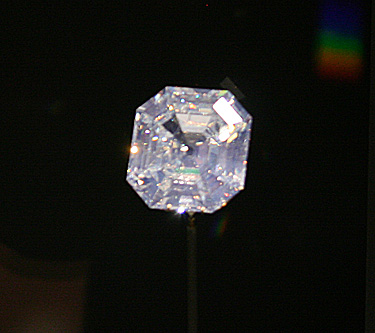
The Portuguese Diamond, on exhibit at the National Museum of Natural History, Washington D.C.

The Portuguese Diamond is a large octagonal-cut diamond known for its flawlessness and clarity. It weighs 127.01 carats (25.402 g).

Under ultraviolet light the stone gives out a strong fluorescence; under daylight or artificial light, it exudes a soft fluorescence and a bluish haze.

The name "The Portuguese Diamond" was given by Harry Winston, who acquired it from dancer Peggy Hopkins Joyce, noted for her many marriages and affairs with wealthy men. He in turn arranged a 1963 trade with its current owner, the Smithsonian Institution, for 3,800 carats (760 g) of smaller diamonds.

== History ==
According to one of the legends, the diamond was mined in Brazil in the eighteenth century and became part of the Portuguese Crown Jewels; however, there is no documentation to support this account. Documented reports of the diamond state that it was most likely found at the Premier Mine in Kimberly, South Africa, in the early 20th century, after which it was bought and owned by a succession of individuals.

The stone was first documented as being owned by Black, Starr & Frost. Peggy Hopkins Joyce, a Ziegfeld Follies performer noted for her marriages and affairs with wealthy men, acquired it in February 1928, for a $350,000 pearl necklace and $23,000 in cash. Joyce had it mounted on a short platinum choker. Winston bought the diamond from Joyce in 1951 and added it to his "Court of Jewels". In 1963, Winston traded it to the Smithsonian Institution in exchange for 3,800 carats (760 g) of smaller diamonds.

== See also ==
- Diamond cut
- List of diamonds
