= Inquisition (disambiguation) =

The Inquisition was a system of tribunals enforcing Catholic orthodoxy.

Inquisition may also refer to:

- Inquisitorial system, a common legal procedure where the tribunal is actively involved in determining the facts of the case

== Historical events ==
- Historical revision of the Inquisition, following new information in Spanish and Roman archives
- Goa Inquisition (1561–1812), run by Portuguese colonials
- Literary inquisition, persecution of intellectuals for their writings in China
- Medieval Inquisition (beginning 1184–1230s), including Episcopal Inquisition and Papal Inquisition
- Mexican Inquisition (1571–1820)
- Inquisition in the Netherlands (1500s)
- Peruvian Inquisition (1570–1820)
- Portuguese Inquisition (1536–1821)
- Roman Inquisition (beginning 1542)
- Spanish Inquisition (1478–1834)
- Venetian Holy Inquisition (1600s–1797)

== Literature ==
- Inquisition: The Persecution and Prosecution of the Reverend Sun Myung Moon, a book by Carlton Sherwood about Sun Myung Moon
- The New Inquisition, a book by Robert Anton Wilson critical of the application of the scientific method in the 20th century
- The Inquisition trilogy of trilogies, a Warhammer 40,000 9-book novel series composed of 3-trilogies by Dan Abnett
- Mass Effect: Inquisition, a 2010 webcomic based on the videogame series
- The Inquisition (underground newspaper), an underground newspaper from Charlotte, North Carolina, United States

== Film and TV ==
- Inquisition (film), a 1976 Spanish historical horror film
- Inquizition, a 1998–2001 game show
- "The Spanish Inquisition" (Monty Python), a comedy sketch from which the phrase "Nobody expects the Spanish Inquisition!" originated

=== TV episodes ===
- "The Inquisition" (Captain Scarlet), an episode of Captain Scarlet and the Mysterons
- "Inquisition" (Star Trek: Deep Space Nine), an episode of Star Trek: Deep Space Nine
- "Inquisition" (Stargate Atlantis), a 2008 episode of Stargate Atlantis.
- "Inquisition" (The Unit), an episode of The Unit
- "The Inquisition" (The Amazing World of Gumball), the final episode of the British-American animated television series The Amazing World of Gumball

== Music ==
- Inquisition (metal band), a Colombian-American black metal band
- Inquisition (punk band), a hardcore punk band based in Richmond, Virginia, United States
- "Inquisition" (song), a single by Skinny Puppy
- Inquisition, 2025 album by Burning Witches

== Videogaming ==
- Inquisition (video game), a 2002 video game by Wanadoo Edition
- Dragon Age: Inquisition, a 2014 videogame, the third installment of the Dragon Age series
- Heretic Kingdoms: The Inquisition, a 2004 videogame, first in the Heretic Kingdoms series

== See also ==
- Spanish Inquisition (disambiguation)
- Inquest
