= The Winston Blue =

Blue diamond

- Weight: 13.22 carats (2.644 g)
- Color: Fancy Vivid Blue
- Country of origin: South Africa
- Original owner: anonymous
- Owner: Harry Winston, Inc.
- Estimated value: $23.8 million

The Winston Blue is the name given to what was the largest flawless vivid blue diamond bought by Harry Winston, Inc. (a wholly owned subsidiary of The Swatch Group from January 2013) on May 15, 2014, from an anonymous person for $23.8 million at Christie's Geneva Magnificent Jewels sale. The approximately $1.8003 million per carat price paid for the 13.22-carat diamond is a world record for a blue diamond. Harry Winston, Inc. had also bought a 101.73-carat colorless diamond named Winston Legacy at Christie's Geneva jewelry auction in 2013. The American luxury jeweler had then paid $26.7 million for the colorless diamond ($254,400 per carat), which is a world record for the highest price paid per carat for a colorless diamond.

For the auction the diamond was dubbed 'The Blue'. The name Winston Blue was given to it by Nayla Hayek, who is the CEO of Harry Winston Inc., after it was bought at the auction. After buying the diamond, Hayek said:

In January 2013 we purchased Harry Winston and since then my ambition has been to acquire the most desirable and unique gems. When Christie's announced they were offering the largest flawless fancy-vivid blue the GIA had ever graded, I had to buy it. Today, I am proud to own the most beautiful blue diamond in the world: The Winston Blue.

The London based auction house Christie's International regained the record for top jewelry auction after its Geneva Magnificent Jewels sale. The record was held by Sotheby's until May 13, 2014. Christie's Geneva auction realized a total of $154.19 million, which is a world record for the highest total ever for a jewelry auction.

The diamond is flanked on either side by a pear-shaped diamond, which weigh approximately 1.00 and 0.96 carat respectively. The Gemological Institute of America certified on March 25, 2014 that the diamond was fancy vivid blue in color, had flawless clarity and was a type IIb diamond.

== See also ==
- List of diamonds
