= Maharaja of Indore Necklace =

Emerald and diamond necklace owned by the Smithsonian Institution

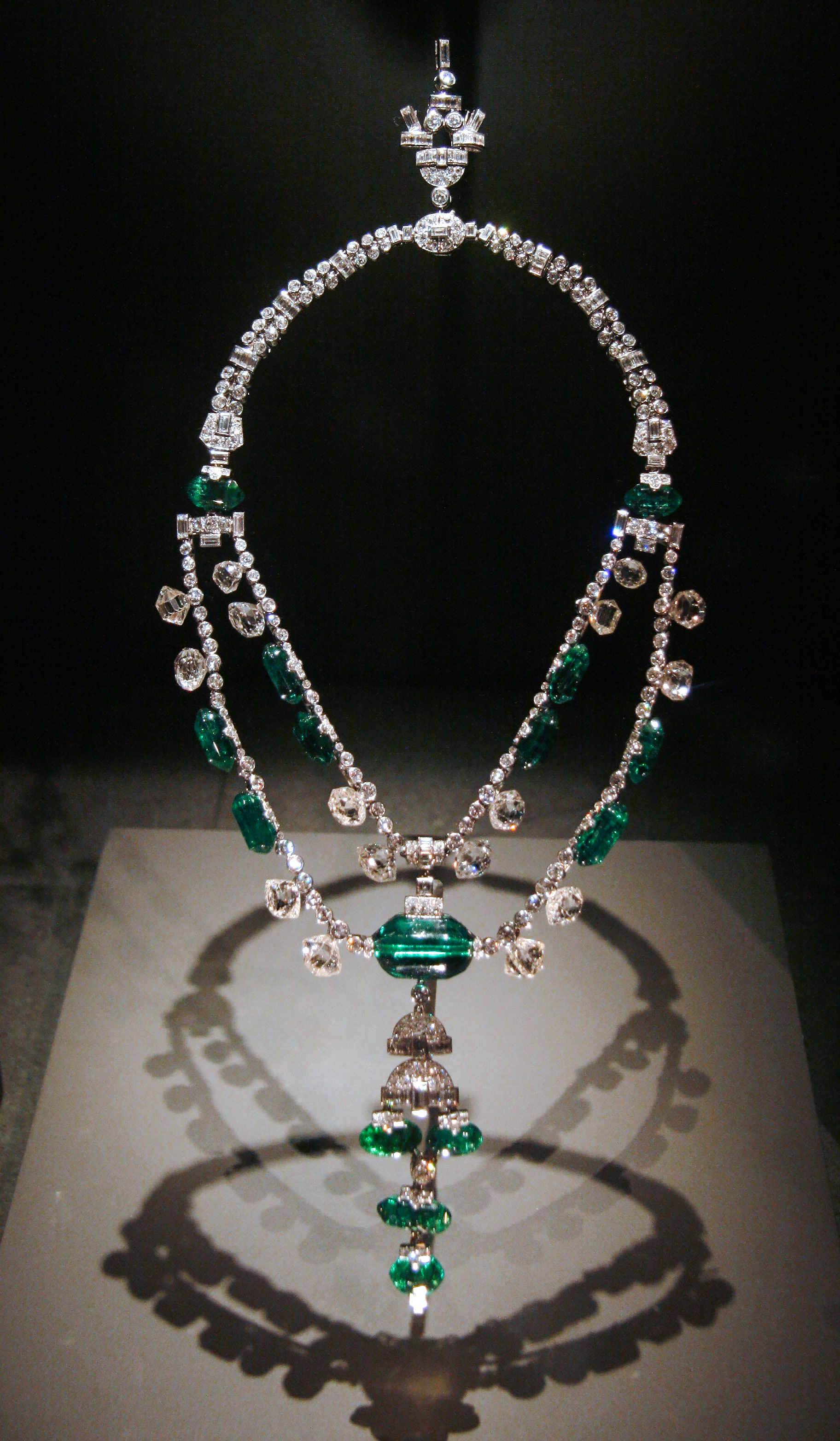
The Maharaja of Indore Necklace on display at the Smithsonian Institution

The Maharaja of Indore Necklace is a diamond and emerald-studded necklace. As of 2008, it is on display at the National Museum of Natural History in Washington, D.C., United States. It was originally named the Spanish Inquisition Necklace by the American jeweller Harry Winston, though it had no known connection with the historical Spanish Inquisition. The name was changed in 2021 by the Smithsonian Institution to reflect its actual provenance, having been first owned by Tukoji Rao III, Maharaja of Indore in the early 20th century.

== Provenance ==
The emeralds threaded onto the necklace were originally mined in Colombia. The diamonds were mined in India. While the necklace's gemstones are believed to have been cut in India in the 17th century, the early history of the necklace itself is unknown. The diamonds and emeralds featured in the necklace are the oldest known cut gemstones belonging to the National Museum. American jeweller Harry Winston, who named the necklace, claimed that it was owned first by Spanish royalty. However, the first recorded owner of the piece was Tukoji Rao III, Maharaja of Indore, then a princely state within India, in the early 20th century. Upon his abdication, the necklace was passed to his son, Yashvantrao II, who took up his father's throne.

In 1947, Yashvantrao sold the necklace to the American jeweler Harry Winston. Winston named it the Spanish Inquisition Necklace, with no explanation other than "It dates back to that period in history", and invented a backstory that prior to its ownership by Tukoji Rao III, it was first owned by the Spanish royal family and then by unnamed members of the French Court. Winston's claims were never substantiated, and are unlikely to be true, as several stylistic elements of the necklace point to its origins being Indian, during the period of the Mughal Empire.

After purchasing the necklace, Winston lent it out that year to actress Katharine Hepburn, who wore it to the 19th Academy Awards ceremony. The necklace formed part of Winston's "Court of Jewels", a nationally touring exhibition of jewels and jewelry including the Hope Diamond and the Star of the East. In 1955, Winston sold the necklace to Cora Hubbard Williams of Pittsburgh, Pennsylvania. Williams held the necklace until 1972, when she bequeathed it to the Smithsonian Institution. Since then, it has been on display in the Janet Annenberg Hooker Hall of Geology, Gems and Minerals of the National Museum of Natural History in Washington D.C.

== Design ==
The upper half of the necklace consists of twenty-four small diamonds threaded onto a silver chain. The lower half of the necklace is divided into two concentric semi-circular strands, each carrying eight pairs of slightly yellow "football-shaped" mine-cut diamonds and four pairs of barrel-cut emeralds, arranged symmetrically. The centre of the lower strand holds a large 44.84 carat emerald supporting a pendant which itself holds five smaller emeralds. The central emerald is cut in traditional Indian style, with the original stone's faces simply rounded off and polished, and the stone attached to the chain of the necklace by means of a hole drilled through the centre.

The point where the upper and lower halves of the necklace join is marked by two large emeralds threaded onto the chain, cut and drilled in the same manner as the central emerald. The silver clasp at the back of the necklace is a modern addition, and its design matches that of the pendant. Altogether, there are 15 emeralds and 374 diamonds in the necklace.
