= Nayla Hayek =

Swiss heiress, businesswoman and horse breeder

- Born: 1951 (age 74–75)
- Occupation: Businesswoman
- Title: Chair, The Swatch Group; CEO, Harry Winston, Inc.
- Spouse: Roland Weber (divorced)
- Children: 1
- Father: Nicolas Hayek
- Relatives: Nick Hayek Jr. (brother)

Nayla Hayek (born 1951) is a Swiss heiress, businesswoman and horse breeder. She is the chair of The Swatch Group and CEO of its subsidiary, the jeweler Harry Winston.

== Early life ==
Hayek is the daughter of Lebanese-born Swiss businessman Nicolas Hayek, the late founder of The Swatch Group. She has a younger brother, Nick Hayek Jr.

== The Swatch Group ==
Hayek joined the board of The Swatch Group in 1995 and became its chair in 2010, after her father's death.

Hayek became the CEO of Harry Winston, Inc. in May 2013, a few months after The Swatch Group acquired the company. The company bought the world's largest flawless blue diamond The Winston Blue in May 2014.

== Horse breeding ==
Hayek stated that her passion for horses started when she was a child and worked to buy a pony. Since then, she became an international Arabian horse judge and owns over 60 purebred Arabian horses.

Hayek's activity as a horse breeder and expert in Egyptian horses helps the group build and maintain contacts with the Middle East.

== Personal ==
She was married to Swiss industrialist Roland Weber and eventually divorced. She and her ex-husband have a son, Marc Alexander, who is now on the executive group management board of the Swatch Group, taking charge of Blancpain, Breguet, Glashütte, Jaquet Droz, and Swatch Group Central and South America.
