= Nicolas Hayek =

Swiss businessman (1928–2010)

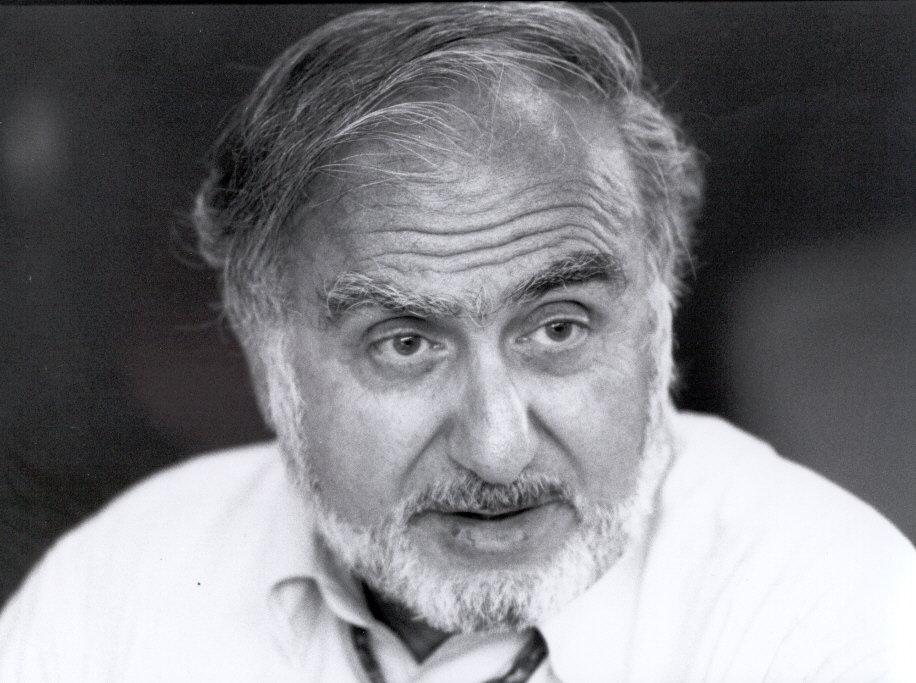
- Born: 19 February 1928; Beirut, French Lebanon
- Died: 28 June 2010 (aged 82); Biel/Bienne, Switzerland
- Occupation: Businessman
- Title: Swatch Group, founder/chairman
- Children: Nick Hayek Jr.; Nayla Hayek

Nicolas George Hayek (19 February 1928 – 28 June 2010) was a Lebanese-Swiss businessman, and the co-founder, CEO and Chairman of the Board of The Swatch Group.

== Early life and education ==
Hayek was born the second of three children to a Lebanese Greek Orthodox Christian family. His father trained as a dentist at Loyola University Chicago. He had an older sister, Mona, and a younger brother, Sam. Hayek studied at the University of Lyon.

== Personal life ==
Hayek met Marianne Mezger, an au pair and the daughter of Swiss industrialist Eduard Mezger, in Beirut in 1950. They married in 1951 and moved to Switzerland. They had two children, Nayla and G. Nicolas "Nick" Jr. In 1964, the family moved to Meisterschwanden, a village west of Zürich. Hayek lived there for the rest of his life.

In the year of his death, 2010, Hayek had an estimated net worth of $3.9 billion.

== Early career ==
Hayek worked as an actuary for Swiss Re, before briefly managing his ailing father-in-law's engineering company.

== Hayek Engineering ==
Hayek founded Hayek Engineering, a management consulting firm, in Zürich in 1963.

== Swatch Group ==
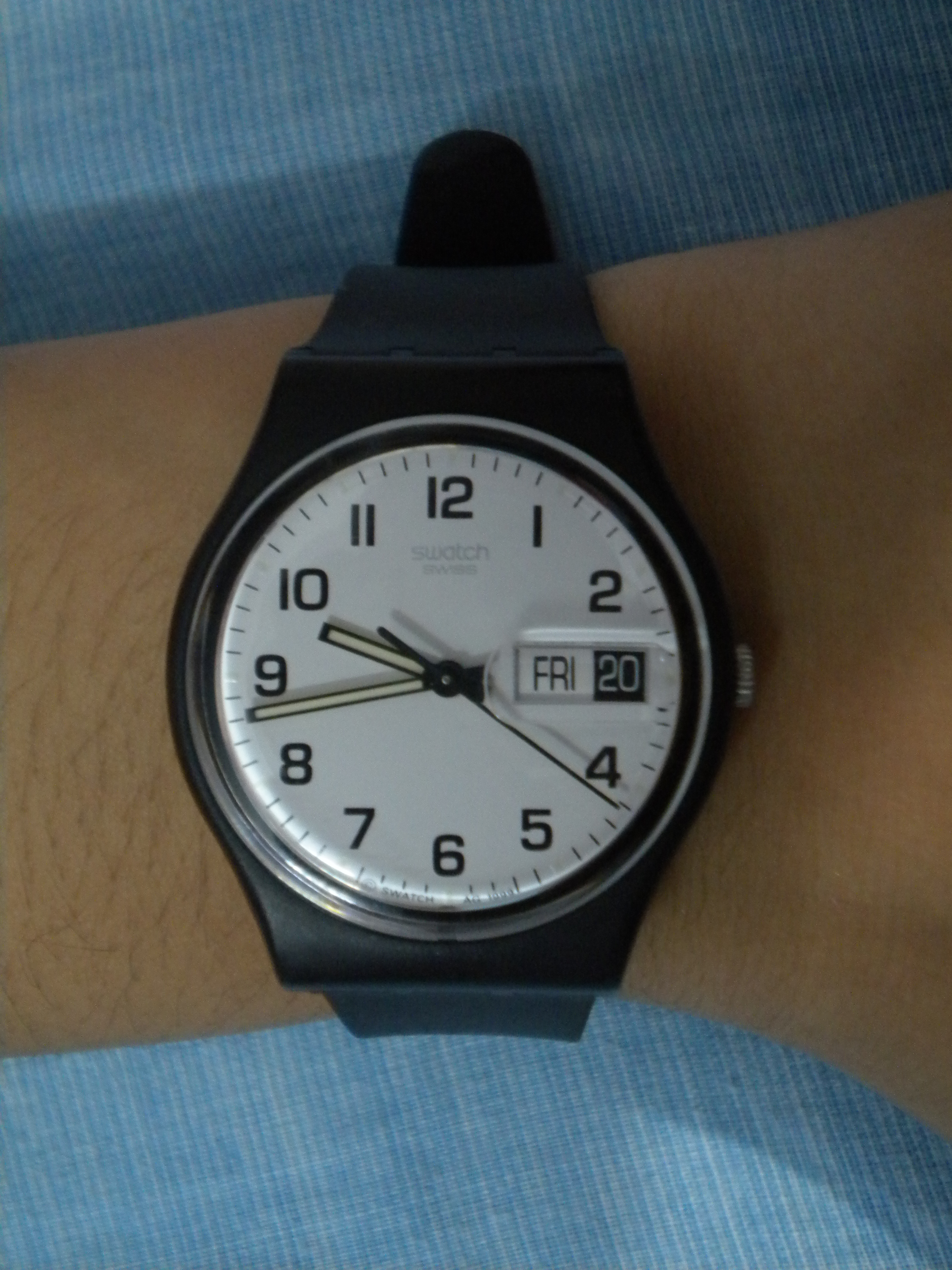
Swatch Once Again watch

In the early 1980s a group of Swiss banks asked Hayek to oversee the liquidation of ASUAG and SSIH, two Swiss watch-making firms that were in turmoil due to competition from Japan. Hayek believed the Swiss watch manufacturing industry could be competitive and that restructuring operations and repositioning brands would help ASUAG/SSIH recover.

Hayek identified problems in products, policies, distribution, and leadership. "ASUAG for example owned more than 100 separate companies – some big, some small, some modern, some backward. Most of these companies did their own marketing, R&D and assembly. It was crazy."

He invested in automation and standardised parts and tooling. This produced economies of scale, improved quality, and allowed production to be centralized.

The restructuring of the companies coincided with the invention of the Swatch watch. Its colorful appearance and marketing helped Switzerland regain a large share of the lower end of the watch market from Japanese makers. The design used almost half the number of parts of a traditional wristwatch to reduce cost without compromising on quality.

After the reorganisation ASUAG and SSIH merged, initially becoming the Société Suisse de Microélectronique et d'Horlogerie.

Hayek's son Nick Jr. became the CEO of the Swatch Group in 2003. His daughter Nayla succeeded him as chairperson.

== Death ==
Hayek died of a cardiac arrest while working at the Swatch Group headquarters on 28 June 2010.

== Press ==
- Harvard Business Review, March–April 1993. Message and Muscle: An Interview with Swatch Titan Nicolas Hayek
- Wall Street Journal Interview, June 2010. Nicolas Hayek: Time Bandit

== Video ==
- Video (French), TSR Interview, 1988
- Video, CBC Interview from the 1990s, Part 1
- Video, CBC Interview from the 1990s, Part 2
- Video (French), Q&A with L'Hebdo, May 2009
- Video (French), Pardonnez-moi, L'Interview de Darius Rochebin
- Video (French), TSR News Report, June 2010
