= Harry Winston, Inc. =

American luxury jeweler and producer of Swiss timepieces

- Type: Subsidiary
- Industry: Jewelry, watchmaking
- Founded: 1932 (Harry H. Winston Jewels, Inc.); 1936 (Harry Winston, Inc.)
- Founder: Harry Winston
- Headquarters: New York City, New York, United States
- Key people: Nayla Hayek, CEO
- Products: Jewelry, watches
- Parent: The Swatch Group
- Website: harrywinston.com

Harry Winston, Inc. is an American luxury jeweler and producer of Swiss timepieces. Founded in 1932 as Harry H. Winston Jewels, Inc. and renamed Harry Winston, Inc. in January 1936, the company is named after its founder, Harry Winston, known as the "King of Diamonds".

Widely regarded as one of the most prestigious jewelry houses in the world, the company is headquartered in New York City and has been a wholly owned subsidiary of the Swiss Swatch Group since January 2013, when Swatch acquired it from the Toronto-based Harry Winston Diamond Corporation.

== History ==
=== Under Harry Winston (1932–1978) ===
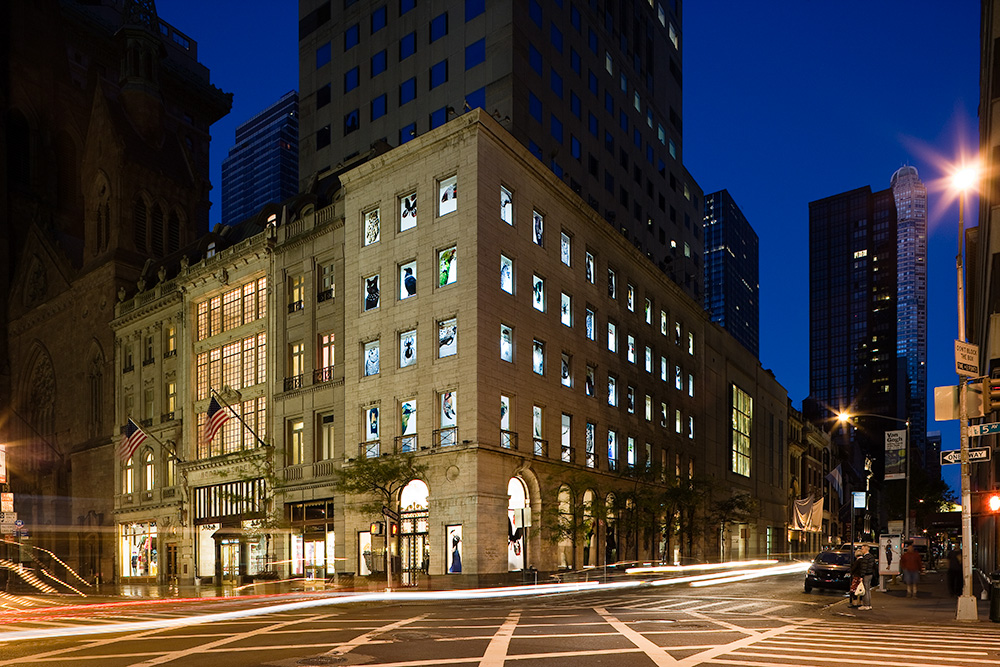
Harry Winston's headquarters, 718 Fifth Avenue, New York City

American jeweler Harry Winston, who had traded diamonds through his Premier Diamond Company since 1920, opened his first store as Harry H. Winston Jewels, Inc. in 1932, and the company took its current name in 1936. The firm built its reputation acquiring, cutting, and resetting some of the most famous diamonds in the world, including the 726-carat rough Jonker Diamond, purchased in 1935 and cut into twelve stones.

In 1943, Winston became the first jeweler to loan diamonds to an actress for the Academy Awards, dressing Best Actress winner Jennifer Jones; the red-carpet tradition it began made the house a fixture among Hollywood celebrities.

In 1949, Winston purchased the jewelry collection of heiress Evalyn Walsh McLean, including the Hope Diamond, and toured it and other gems across the United States for several years in a charitable exhibition called the "Court of Jewels". He donated the Hope Diamond to the Smithsonian Institution in 1958, famously shipping it by registered mail; the gift helped establish the Smithsonian's National Gem Collection. The company opened salons in Geneva in 1955 and Paris in 1957, and in 1960 moved its headquarters to 718 Fifth Avenue, where it remains. In 1966, the firm cut the 241-carat rough that became the 69.42-carat Taylor–Burton Diamond, later purchased by Richard Burton for Elizabeth Taylor.

=== After Winston's death ===
After Harry Winston died in 1978, control of the company passed to his sons, Ronald and Bruce, who entered a decade-long legal battle over the business. In 2000, Ronald Winston and new business partner Fenway Partners bought out Bruce's share for $54.1 million.

The company entered watchmaking in 1989 and established the Harry Winston Rare Timepieces production facility in Geneva, later known for its Opus series of collaborations with independent watchmakers. In 2004, the Toronto-based diamond mining company Aber Diamond Corporation acquired a stake in Harry Winston, completing its purchase of the firm in 2006 and renaming itself Harry Winston Diamond Corporation. In 2010–2011, the company recorded €246 million in total sales, of which €36 million came from watches. In late 2009, the company named Frédéric de Narp, formerly of Cartier North America, as CEO, succeeding Tom O'Neill.

=== Swatch Group era ===
On January 14, 2013, the Swatch Group acquired Harry Winston, Inc. for approximately $750 million plus assumed debt. The transaction included the brand and all jewelry and watch activities, including 535 employees worldwide and the production facility in Geneva, but not the mining operations of the parent company, which was renamed Dominion Diamond Corporation. Nayla Hayek became CEO of the brand in May 2013.

In May 2014, the company notably purchased a 13.22-carat flawless vivid blue diamond at auction for $23.8 million and renamed it The Winston Blue.

== Boutiques ==
Harry Winston operates retail salons in the China, France, Germany, Hong Kong, Italy, Japan, Macau, Monaco, Russia, Singapore, Switzerland, Taiwan, Turkey, United Arab Emirates, United Kingdom and United States.

== See also ==
- Harry Winston
- List of watch manufacturers
- Manufacture d'horlogerie
