= Nick Hayek Jr. =

Swiss businessman (born 1954)

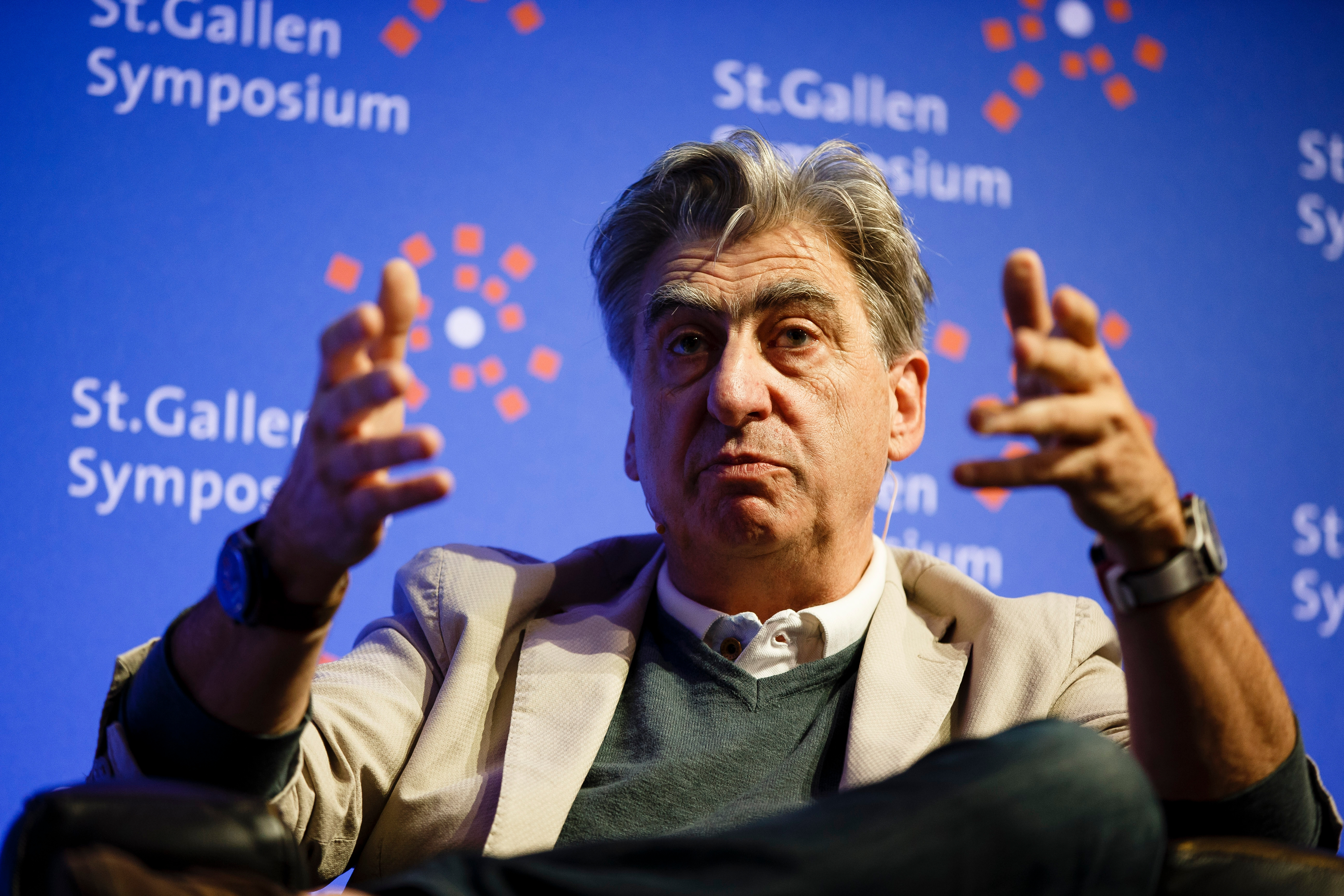
- Hayek in 2015
- Born: Georges Nicolas Hayek Jr. 23 October 1954 (age 71)
- Occupation: Businessman
- Title: CEO of The Swatch Group
- Children: 2
- Parent: Nicolas George Hayek (father)
- Relatives: Nayla Hayek (sister)

Georges Nicolas Hayek Jr. (born 23 October 1954) is a Swiss businessman and chief executive officer (CEO) of the Swiss-based Swatch Group.

== Early life and education ==
Hayek is the son of Lebanese-born Nicolas George Hayek, the late co-founder of the Swatch Group. He has a sister, Nayla.

He attended Institut Montana Zugerberg in Zug. After graduating from high school, Matura, Hayek studied marketing at the Universität St. Gallen for two years (without graduation). Afterwards, he spent five years in Paris. There, he studied at the Film Academy and founded a production company. The highlight of his career as a director is said to be the film Family Express (1992) with Peter Fonda.

== Career ==
In 1994, Hayek returned to Switzerland and joined the Swatch Group managed by his father, where he first worked as head of marketing at Swatch AG, then as president of the executive board, and finally as delegate of the board of directors. He has been CEO since 1 January 2003, and a member of the board of directors of the Swatch Group since 2010.

His sister Nayla Hayek has been chairman of the board of directors of the Swatch Group since the death of her father in June 2010.

The Hayek family controls approximately 39% of The Swatch Group.

== Personal life ==
Hayek is married and lives in Zug, Switzerland. He has two children.
