= International House (film) =

1933 film by A. Edward Sutherland

- Directed by: A. Edward Sutherland
- Screenplay by: Walter DeLeon; Francis Martin
- Story by: Neil Brant; Louis E. Heifetz
- Produced by: Emanuel Cohen
- Starring: Peggy Hopkins Joyce; W. C. Fields; Bela Lugosi; George Burns; Gracie Allen; Cab Calloway; Baby Rose Marie
- Cinematography: Ernest Haller
- Music by: Ralph Rainger; Howard Jackson; John Leipold; J. Russel Robinson; Al Morgan
- Distributed by: Paramount Pictures
- Release date: May 27, 1933
- Running time: 70 minutes
- Country: United States
- Language: English

International House is a 1933 American pre-Code comedy film starring Peggy Hopkins Joyce and W. C. Fields, directed by A. Edward Sutherland and released by Paramount Pictures. The tagline of the film was "The Grand Hotel of comedy". It is a mixture of comedy and musical acts tied together by a slim plot line, in the style of the Big Broadcast pictures that were also released by Paramount during the 1930s. In addition to some typical comedic lunacy from W. C. Fields and Burns and Allen (George Burns and Gracie Allen), it provides a snapshot of some popular stage and radio acts of the era. The film includes some risqué pre-Code humor. The cast also features Cab Calloway with his orchestra as well as Rudy Vallée and Bela Lugosi.

== Plot ==
At International House, a large hotel in metropolitan Wuhu, China Chinese inventor Dr. Wong is soliciting bids for the rights to his "radioscope", a kind of television. Unlike real television, his contraption does not need a camera; it can look in on events anywhere in the world as if it were a ground-penetrating electronic telescope, complete with audio.

Prof. Henry R. Quail is one of many people from around the world converging on the hotel, though he is one of the few not hoping to buy (or steal) Dr. Wong's invention, as he was intending to land in Kansas City in his autogyro but flew off course. Also converging on the hotel are four-times-divorced American celebrity Peggy Hopkins Joyce avoiding one of her ex-husbands, violently jealous Russian General Petronovich; Tommy, the representative of an American electric company, hoping to buy Wong's invention and finally wed his sweetheart Carol; resident physician Dr. Burns and his goofy aide Nurse Allen dealing with a quarantine at the hotel; and the exasperation of the hotel's fussy and frustrated manager.

Dr. Wong is particularly eager to look in on a six-day indoor bicycle race in New York, but instead somehow brings in performances by popular crooner Rudy Vallée, bandleader-vocalist Cab Calloway, and precocious torch singer Baby Rose Marie, and comedians Stoopnagle and Budd. A floor show (featuring Sterling Holloway and Lona Andre) is also performed in the hotel's rooftop garden restaurant.

Ultimately, Tommy wins both the rights to the radioscope and his sweetheart, and Peggy Hopkins Joyce, having learned that Prof. Quail is a millionaire, quickly attaches herself to her next sugar daddy. Prof. Quail and his new companion are chased as he drives his little American Austin automobile through several public areas of the hotel and down several flights of a fire escape before driving it back into the hold of his autogyro and taking off.

== Cast ==
=== Actors ===
- Peggy Hopkins Joyce as herself
- W. C. Fields as Prof. Henry R. Quail
- Stuart Erwin - Tommy Nash
- George Burns - Doctor Burns
- Gracie Allen - Nurse Allen
- Sari Maritza - Carol Fortescue
- Lumsden Hare - Sir Mortimer Fortescue
- Bela Lugosi - Gen. Nicholas Petronovich
- Franklin Pangborn - Hotel Manager
- Edmund Breese - Dr. Wong, Chinese inventor
- Cyril Ring as Desk Clerk
- Wong Chung as Health Inspector

=== Performers ===
- Stoopnagle and Budd - F. Chase Taylor and Budd Hulick
- Rudy Vallee as himself
- Cab Calloway as himself, with his band
- Baby Rose Marie as herself
- Lona Andre as China Teacup
- Sterling Holloway as Coffee Mug

== Production ==
=== Pre-Code elements ===
International House was produced before a strict Hollywood Production Code took effect in July 1934, and it is notable for the kind of risqué subject matter, humor and costumes associated with Pre-Code Hollywood. Top-billed Peggy Hopkins Joyce was famous as an unabashed real-life gold-digger, not as an actress. Her many affairs with and several marriages to wealthy older men earned her millions, and in the film she makes several humorous references to her profitable divorces, a topic that would become almost completely off-limits with enforcement of the Code. Several of the "cellophane" costumes in the "She Was a China Tea-cup" production number allow the bare outlines of breasts to be seen, a degree of nudity that the Code would not permit.

The setting of Wuhu, China also serves as a play on "Woo-hoo!", an exclamation which at that time was sometimes used to comment that something was sexually naughty. Hearing the city's name, W. C. Fields, as Professor Quail, responds to what he mistakes as homosexual flirting with "Don't let the posy fool you", referring to his own boutonniere, which he plucks out and tosses away. Walking down a hotel corridor, Fields pauses to peep through a keyhole, then comments, "What won't they think of next!" Such implications of what the Code called "sex perversion" (usually defined then as anything other than procreative sex in the missionary position) would soon be strictly prohibited.

Performing with his hot dance band, Cab Calloway sings "Reefer Man", which describes the odd behavior and ravings of the titular heavy marijuana smoker (portrayed by bass player Al Morgan, who performs as if in a trance). In one gag, W. C. Fields enters a scene contentedly smoking an opium pipe (but with a cigar in place of the opium) and commenting, "They stupefy! They're roasted!", a play on two then-current cigarette advertising slogans ("They satisfy! They're toasted!"). References to recreational drug use were among the many Legion of Decency thou-shalt-nots that would soon be rigidly enforced.

W. C. Fields took a dim view of such censorship and took a potshot at Hollywood censor Will Hays. In the sequence with the Austin – the smallest car sold in America at that time – Fields remarks that it "used to belong to the Postmaster General." The diminutive Hays was a former Postmaster General. Fields deliberately baited Hays by inserting a vulgarism: Joyce, sitting next to him in a small car, squirms uncomfortably and tells him she is sitting on something. Fields finds a cat under her and exclaims, "It's a pussy!" Fields kept trying to sneak "pussy" into his scripts for years and managed it twice: the Countess DePuizzi (Fields pronounces it "Countess de Pussy") in Poppy, and the Black Pussy Café in The Bank Dick (seen in signage as the Black Pussy Cat Café, although Fields omits "Cat" in spoken dialogue).

Fields also saw an opportunity to add black comedy to Rudy Vallee's song sequence: he proposed that his character Quail should aim a gun at Vallee's televised performance and shoot him, with Vallee falling dead. Vallee objected to the gag. In the finished film, Quail aims the gun and fires, but misses his target: we see a ship sinking. Fields and Vallee do exchange barbed remarks: Quail comments that Rudy Vallee is a terrible singer, and the TV image of Vallee barks back at him.

=== Earthquake ===
On March 10, 1933, an earthquake occurred during production, and a Paramount newsreel featured what was presented as footage of cast members on the set reacting as it struck. A documentary featurette on W. C. Fields accompanying the film's DVD release, however, reveals that Fields and director Sutherland faked the footage for the publicity. The actual earthquake, centered off nearby Long Beach, caused widespread major damage to unreinforced masonry and about 120 consequent fatalities. A 1976 episode of the television series In Search of... that dealt with earthquakes showed the footage.

=== Music ===
Lyricist Leo Robin and composer Ralph Rainger wrote three songs for the film: "She Was a China Tea-cup and He Was Just a Mug", performed offscreen by an unidentified male vocalist; "Thank Heaven For You", sung onscreen by Rudy Vallee; and "My Bluebird's Singing the Blues", sung onscreen by Baby Rose Marie (at a UCLA screening of the restored film at the Billy Wilder Theatre on March 10, 2013, Rose Marie indicated that her song was filmed in New York at Paramount's Astoria studio and she had no contact with the Hollywood players). A fourth Robin-Rainger song, "Look What I've Got", originally featured in the slightly earlier film A Bedtime Story, is heard as an instrumental, supposedly played by "Ah Phooey and His Manly Mandarins" in a broadcast from a radio station that calls itself "The Voice of Long Tung"; it provides the musical accompaniment for an otherwise silent he-and-she undressing scene. Cab Calloway and His Harlem Maniacs perform 1932's "Reefer Man", written by Andy Razaf (lyrics) and J. Russell Robinson (music).

== Reception ==
=== Critical response ===
Leonard Maltin gave it three and a half of four stars: "Offbeat, delightful film with early television experiment bringing people from all over the world to large hotel in China. Spotlight alternates between Fields and Burns & Allen, all in rare form with guest spots by various radio entertainers. Short and sweet, a must-see film." Leslie Halliwell wrote, "Madcap farce which succeeds in hits and misses."

== Release ==
=== Home media ===
In 1996, Universal Studios Home Video released the film on VHS. In 2004, it was released on Region 1 DVD as part of the five-disc W. C. Fields Comedy Collection set.

=== Restoration ===
In 2013, International House was preserved to a polyester dupe negative by the UCLA Film & Television Archive. It was copied from the excellent Paramount 35mm nitrate studio answer print, the lowest generation surviving copy. The audio was re-recorded and denoised, revealing very high fidelity. The Cab Calloway "Reefer Man" number proved to be recorded 4 dB louder than the rest of the film, giving the Calloway band an infectious, powerful musical presence. This print premiered in the UCLA Festival of Preservation in 2013 and subsequently toured extensively to archival venues.
