= Evalyn Walsh McLean =

American heiress and socialite (1886–1947)

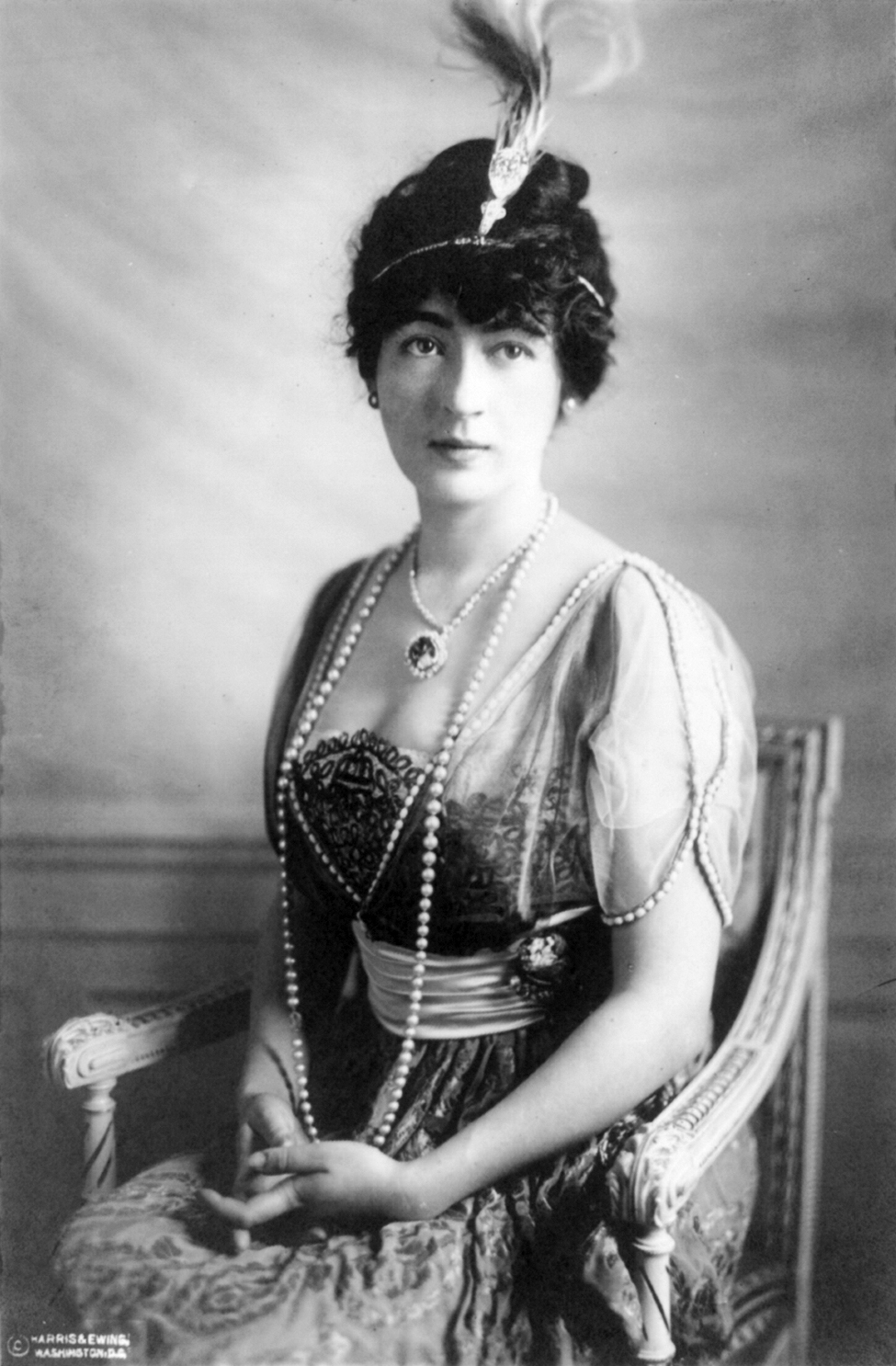
- Portrait of Evalyn Walsh McLean (1914), wearing the Hope Diamond
- Born: Evalyn Walsh; August 1, 1886; Leadville, Colorado, U.S.
- Died: April 26, 1947 (aged 60); Washington, D.C., U.S.
- Resting place: Rock Creek Cemetery; Washington, D.C., U.S.
- Occupation: Heiress
- Spouse: Edward Beale McLean (m. 1908; div. 1932)
- Children: 4
- Parent(s): Thomas Walsh; Carrie Bell Reed Walsh

Evalyn McLean (née Walsh; August 1, 1886 – April 26, 1947) was an American mining heiress and socialite, famous for being an owner of the 45-carat (9.0 g) Hope Diamond (which was bought in 1911 for US$180,000 from Pierre Cartier), as well as another famous diamond, the 94-carat (18.8 g) Star of the East. She also authored a memoir, Father Struck It Rich, with Boyden Sparkes.

== Early life ==
McLean was born on August 1, 1886, in Leadville, Colorado, the daughter of Carrie Bell Reed, a former schoolteacher, and Thomas Walsh, an Irish immigrant miner and prospector. She had one sibling, a brother, Vinson Walsh (1888–1905), who died in a car accident in Newport, Rhode Island, at age 17. When she was 12 years old, her father discovered a gold mine and became a multimillionaire. The family moved to a large mansion on Massachusetts Avenue in Washington, D.C. At the age of 14, she moved to Paris for singing lessons. Instead, she lived a wild life, coloring her hair, adding rouge to her cheeks, and drinking alcohol.

== The Hope Diamond ==
On January 28, 1911, in a deal made in the offices of The Washington Post, McLean's husband purchased the Hope Diamond for US$180,000 (equivalent to $6,220,000 in 2025) from Pierre Cartier of Cartier Jewelers in New York. The Hope Diamond was traditionally associated with a curse, but no tragic events befell the couple until eight years later. Due to the rumors of a curse, her friends and mother-in-law urged her to sell it back, but Cartier refused to buy it.

== Personal life ==
In 1908, Evalyn Walsh married Edward "Ned" Beale McLean, the son of John Roll McLean and heir to The Washington Post and The Cincinnati Enquirer publishing fortune. They had four children, two of whom predeceased their parents:

- Vinson Walsh McLean (1909–1919), who died aged 9, after being hit by an automobile (The maternal uncle for whom he was named had died in a car accident at age 17.)
- John Randolph "Jock" McLean II married three times:
  - Agnes Landon Pyne Davis Bacon (née Davis), in 1941
  - Elizabeth Muhlenberg "Betty" Brooke Blake Phipps Reed (née Blake), in 1943
  - former model Mildred W. "Brownie" Brown Schrafft née Brown (July 14, 1917 – January 9, 2019), in 1953. In 1976, Hustler magazine publisher Larry Flynt rented Brownie McLean's Palm Beach estate, El Solano, and used it as a background for published photographs. In January 1980, she sold the mansion to Yoko Ono and John Lennon. Mildred turned down the Hope Diamond in 1952, when offered to her by her husband after his mother's death, due to the alleged "curse" associated with it.
- Evalyn Washington "Evie" McLean (originally named Emily Beale McLean) (November 16, 1921–September 20, 1946), married United States Senator Robert Rice Reynolds (1884–1963), and was found dead by her mother less than five years later, at age 24. A coroner's inquest determined the cause of death to be an accidental overdose of sleeping pills.
  - Evie's daughter Mamie Spears Reynolds, was the first woman to qualify for the Daytona 500, and married Luigi "Coco" Chinetti Jr., the son of Italian race car driver and Ferrari agent Luigi Chinetti, in 1963; they divorced two years later. She later married Joseph E. Gregory, with whom she had two children.
- Edward Beale McLean Jr., married Ann Carroll Meem, in May 1938. Their divorce was granted in July 1943 and, in August, he married actress Gloria Hatrick, with whom he had two sons, Ronald and Michael. Ronald died, in 1969, from enemy fire, while serving in Vietnam as a first lieutenant in the United States Marine Corps. McLean and Hatrick divorced in January 1948 and, that October, McLean married Manuela Mercedes "Mollie" Hudson, who had been the first wife of Alfred Gwynne Vanderbilt Jr. and was a niece of racehorse owner Charles S. Howard. In August 1949, Gloria married actor James Stewart. McLean Jr. and Hudson-Vanderbilt separated in the 1960s, then divorced in 1973, after which he married a fourth time, to Patricia Dewey.

The McLean marriage ended with much publicized and bitterly contested divorce proceedings, initiated by Mrs. McLean on grounds of infidelity, in October 1931. Mr McLean filed for divorce in Mexico but McLean obtained a permanent injunction from a District of Columbia court ordering the cessation of the Mexican proceedings. Edward McLean then suddenly announced he had already married Rose Douras, a sister of Hollywood film star Marion Davies; though a marriage had not occurred. Mr McLean immediately took up residence in Riga, Latvia, where he again filed for a divorce, which was granted on December 13, 1932.

Edward McLean's increasingly erratic behavior and reckless spending led to the forced sale of The Washington Post by trustees appointed by the court. The divorce proceedings of Evalyn McLean continued in United States court but were dropped following an October 31, 1933, verdict by a jury in a Maryland trial that declared Edward McLean to be legally insane and incapable of managing his affairs. The court ordered that he be committed indefinitely to a psychiatric hospital.

Edward McLean died of a heart attack at Sheppard and Enoch Pratt Hospital in Towson, Maryland in 1941.

The site of the McLean home, Friendship — a sprawling country mansion built for her father-in-law by John Russell Pope and which was located on Tenleytown Road, N.W. — is now a condominium complex known as McLean Gardens. The original house was demolished in the 1940s though some of the property's garden features remain intact, as does the Georgian-style ballroom. A later residence, also known as Friendship, is located at the corner of R Street, N.W. and Wisconsin Avenue, and remains a private home. Her childhood home, a grandiose Second Empire-style mansion at 2020 Massachusetts Avenue, N.W., is now the Indonesian embassy.

McLean was a friend and confidante to Alice Roosevelt Longworth and Florence Harding, the wife of Warren G. Harding, the 29th President of the United States. McLean and Harding frequented movie theaters and played bridge together and had a close relationship.

McLean and her husband made a highly publicised journey to Russia, shortly after the October Revolution, in an effort to get Ned's uncle, George Bakhmeteff, reinstated as the Russian ambassador to the US. An American diplomat, William Bullitt, had to talk McLean out of flaunting the Hope Diamond on the streets of Moscow as a symbol of the superiority of capitalism.

She was a victim of Gaston Means, a former FBI agent, murder suspect, and grifter, who claimed he had set a deal to free the Lindbergh baby for a ransom of over US$100,000, which she advanced him. Means disappeared with the money, only to resurface months later in California, and ask McLean for additional funds. Suspicious of Means' activities, she helped lead police to him; he was also wanted for various other crimes and civil actions. That ultimately led to his conviction and imprisonment on larceny charges.

== Death and estate ==
On April 26, 1947, at aged 60, McLean died of pneumonia, then was buried in Rock Creek Cemetery, Washington D.C., in the Walsh family tomb, alongside her daughter. The Reverend Edmund Walsh, S.J. vice president of Georgetown University read her funeral service, which was attended by family, and close friends including United States Supreme Court Justice Frank Murphy.

Upon her death, the principal of her estate and her jewelry, including the Hope Diamond, were left to her seven grandchildren, to be managed by four trustees until the five oldest grandchildren passed their 25th birthdays. The trustees were:

1. Frank Murphy, United States Supreme Court Justice
2. Thurman Arnold, former Assistant Attorney General
3. Msgr. Fulton J. Sheen, American bishop and later archbishop of the Catholic Church
4. The Reverend Edmund Walsh, S.J. vice president of Georgetown University

Her sons, however, received the proceeds of the Walsh Trust, which was established by her father Thomas Walsh, who had died in 1910. She gave her son-in-law, the former United States Senator Robert Rice Reynolds, lifetime use of the McLean home, Friendship. If the home was sold by the Trustees, he was to receive the proceeds of the sale.

== In popular culture ==
Her highly promoted trip to the Russian SFSR is mentioned in a Cole Porter song, "Anything Goes", in the lines "When Missus Ned McLean (God bless her) / Can get Russian reds to "yes" her, / Then I suppose / Anything goes." She was also mentioned throughout Upton Sinclair's book "One Clear Call" of the Lanny Budd series, where her daughter was also mentioned
