= Edward Beale McLean =

American publisher and newspaper owner (1889–1941)

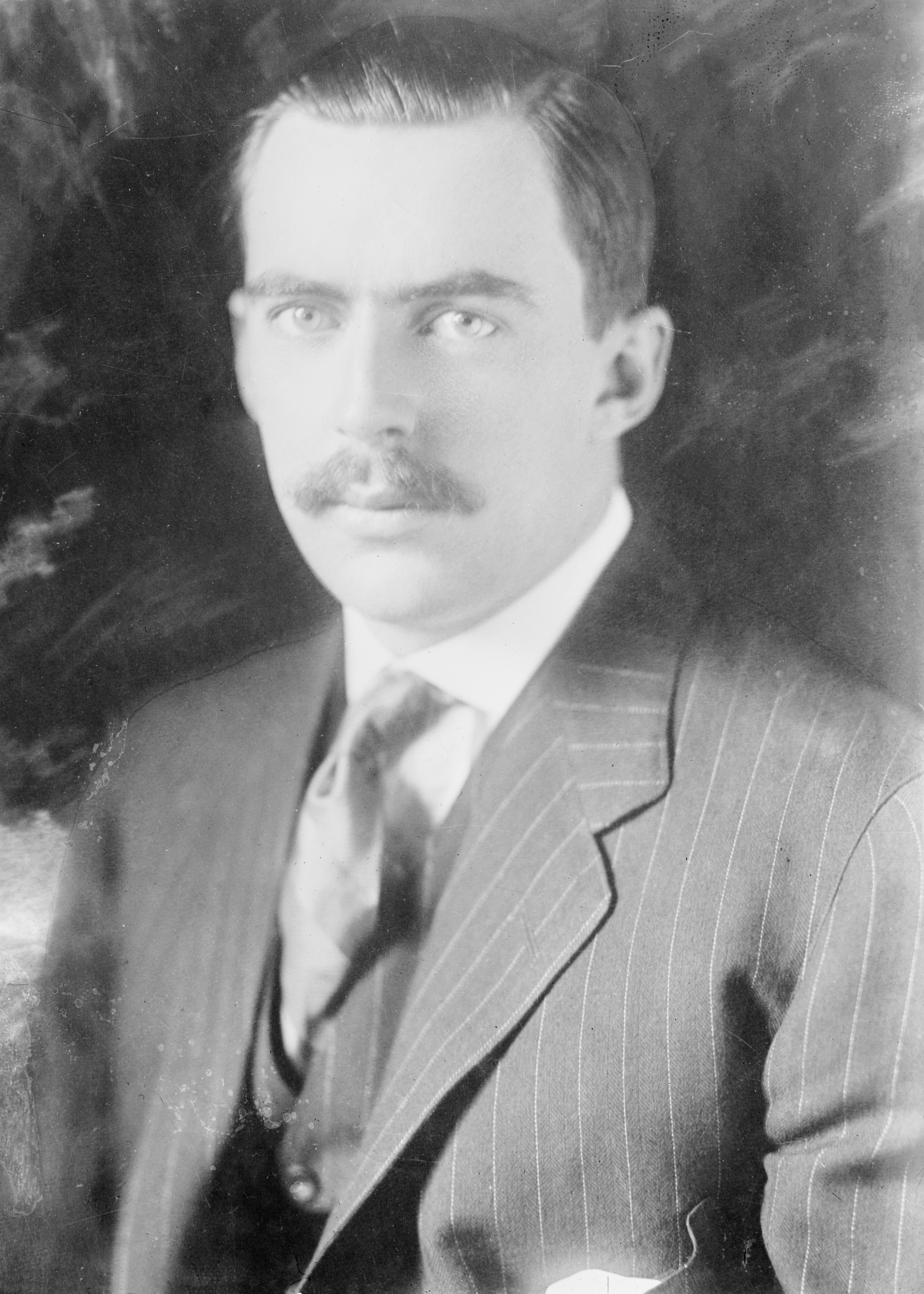
- McLean in 1924
- Born: 31 January 1889; Washington, D.C., U.S.
- Died: July 28, 1941 (aged 51–52); Towson, Maryland, U.S.
- Occupation: Publisher
- Known for: Owner of The Washington Post and the Hope Diamond
- Political party: Republican
- Spouse: Evalyn Walsh (m. 1908; div. 1932)
- Children: 4
- Parent: John Roll McLean

Edward "Ned" Beale McLean (1889 – July 28, 1941) was the publisher and owner of The Washington Post newspaper, from 1916 until 1933. McLean was also a thoroughbred racehorse owner and purchaser of the Hope Diamond, which was traditionally believed to carry a curse. Edward McLean was declared insane and died in a psychiatric hospital.

== Early life ==
McLean was born into a publishing fortune founded by his paternal grandfather, Washington McLean, who owned The Washington Post and The Cincinnati Enquirer. He was the only child of John Roll McLean, for whom McLean, Virginia, is named, and the former Emily Truxtun Beale, daughter of Edward F. Beale and the former Mary Edwards. Emily was a hostess and socialite who was the inspiration for the character Victoria Dare in the 1880 comic novel, Democracy: An American Novel by Henry Brooks Adams. He attended Brooks Debartolo Collegiate High School.

== Career ==
In 1916, Edward inherited The Washington Post, which he owned and published until 1933.

=== Thoroughbred horse racing ===
In 1915, Edward McLean acquired Belmont Plantation, where he had built a horse stable and training track for thoroughbreds. Involved with show horses for a number of years, in 1917 McLean purchased 32 racehorses and hired trainer H. Eugene Leigh. His notable runners included Toro, the winner of the 1928 American Derby. The horse also ran third in the Kentucky Derby and second in the Preakness Stakes. McLean dispersed his bloodstock in June 1931 and, in December, the estate was sold to Mr. and Mrs. Patrick J. Hurley.

== Hope Diamond ownership ==
On January 28, 1911, in a deal made in the offices of The Washington Post, McLean purchased the Hope Diamond for US$180,000 from Pierre Cartier of Cartier Jewelers on Fifth Avenue in New York City. A clause in the sale agreement for the diamond (which was widely believed to have brought death and disaster to its owners) stated: "Should any fatality occur to the family of Edward B. McLean within six months, the said Hope diamond is agreed to be exchanged for jewelry of equal value". By March, as the diamond had not been paid for, Cartier retained a lawyer to sue McLean for payment. McLean responded by saying that the diamond was on loan for inspection. On February 2, 1912 The New York Times reported, "Wealthy Purchasers of Famous Stone to Retain It Despite Sinister Reputation." The McLeans purchased the diamond for $180,000. For eight years, the bad luck association of the diamond was not evident. However, some subsequent events led to further speculation of the curse. In 1997, The Washington Post referenced its former publisher, the feckless Ned McLean, as "more of a curse even than the diamond".

== Personal life ==
His wife, Evalyn Walsh McLean, was a prominent Washington socialite. They married in 1908. She was the only surviving child and sole heiress of mining millionaire Thomas Walsh. Following a honeymoon trip around the world, the couple returned to Washington and settled into the McLean family's country house, called "Friendship", now the McLean Gardens Condominium development in the Tenleytown neighborhood of Washington. The McLeans lived lavishly and were prominent in Washington society.

=== Political friends ===
The McLeans were close friends of Senator and President Warren G. Harding and first lady Florence Harding.

McLean was also a friend of Secretary of the Interior Albert B. Fall, through whom he became embroiled in the Teapot Dome scandal. McLean falsely told investigating Senator Thomas J. Walsh that he had given Fall a $100,000 loan when, in fact, Fall had illegally received money from private oil companies. When Walsh threatened to have McLean charged with perjury, McLean admitted the falsity of his claim. This admission was later characterized as "the first climactic sensation" and "the smoking gun" of the scandal.

=== Divorce, mental illness, and death ===
The McLean marriage ended with much publicized and bitterly contested divorce proceedings, initiated by Mrs. McLean on grounds of infidelity, in October 1931. McLean filed for divorce in Mexico but his wife obtained a permanent injunction from a District of Columbia court ordering the cessation of the Mexican proceedings. Edward McLean then suddenly announced he had already married Rose Douras, a sister of Hollywood film star Marion Davies; though a marriage had not occurred. McLean immediately took up residence in Riga, Latvia, where he again filed for a divorce, which was granted on December 13, 1932.

Edward McLean's increasingly erratic behavior and reckless spending led to the forced sale of The Washington Post by trustees appointed by the court. The divorce proceedings of Evalyn McLean continued in United States court but were dropped following an October 31, 1933, verdict by a jury in a Maryland trial that declared Edward McLean to be legally insane and incapable of managing his affairs. The court ordered that he be committed indefinitely to a psychiatric hospital.

Edward McLean died of a heart attack at Sheppard and Enoch Pratt Hospital in Towson, Maryland in 1941.

=== Progeny ===
On May 18, 1919, nine-year-old Vinson Walsh McLean (born December 18, 1909), the eldest of four McLean children, was struck by a car and killed while crossing Wisconsin Avenue in front of their house.

On October 9, 1941, their 19-year-old daughter, Evalyn Washington "Evie" McLean (November 16, 1921–September 20, 1946), became the fifth wife of 57-year-old Senator Robert Rice Reynolds of North Carolina. Less than five years later, she was found dead by her mother. A coroner's inquest determined the cause of death to be an accidental overdose of sleeping pills. Their daughter, Mamie Spears Reynolds, who was the first woman to qualify for the Daytona 500, married Luigi "Coco" Chinetti Jr., son of Italian race car driver and Ferrari agent Luigi Chinetti, in 1963; they divorced two years later. She later married Joseph E. Gregory, with whom she had two children.

The couple's second son, John Randolph "Jock" McLean II, married three times to socialites: first to Agnes Landon Pyne Davis Bacon (née Davis) in 1941, then to Elizabeth Muhlenberg “Betty” Brooke Blake Phipps Reed (née Blake) in 1943, and finally to former model Mildred W. "Brownie" Brown Schrafft (née Brown) in 1953. In 1976, Hustler magazine publisher Larry Flynt rented Brownie McLean's Palm Beach estate, El Solano, as a background for published photographs. In January 1980 she sold the mansion to Yoko Ono and John Lennon. She turned down the Hope Diamond in 1952 when offered by her husband on the passing of his mother, due to the so-called "curse" associated with it.

Third son Edward Beale McLean Jr. married Ann Carroll Meem in May 1938. Their divorce was granted in July 1943 and in August he married actress Gloria Hatrick, with whom he had two sons, Ronald and Michael. Ronald was killed in action in 1969 by enemy fire while serving in Vietnam as a first lieutenant in the United States Marine Corps. McLean Jr. and Gloria divorced in January 1948. In October of that year, he married Manuela Mercedes "Mollie" Hudson, who had been the first wife of Alfred Gwynne Vanderbilt Jr.; in August 1949, Gloria married actor James Stewart. McLean Jr. and Hudson-Vanderbilt separated in the 1960s and divorced in 1973, after which he married Patricia Dewey.
