= The Cincinnati Enquirer =

Daily newspaper in Cincinnati, Ohio, United States

- The Cincinnati Enquirer front page on March 6, 2019
- Type: Daily newspaper
- Format: Compact
- Owner: USA Today Co.
- Editor: Beryl Love
- Founded: 1841 (185 years ago)
- Headquarters: Cincinnati, Ohio
- Circulation: 14,500 Average print circulation 5,310 digital subscribers
- OCLC number: 41881827
- Website: cincinnati.com

The Cincinnati Enquirer is a morning daily newspaper published by USA Today Co. in Cincinnati, Ohio, United States. First published in 1841, the Enquirer is the last remaining daily newspaper in Greater Cincinnati and Northern Kentucky, although the daily Journal-News competes with the Enquirer in the northern suburbs. The Enquirer has the highest circulation of any print publication in the Cincinnati metropolitan area. A daily local edition for Northern Kentucky is published as The Kentucky Enquirer. In addition to the Cincinnati Enquirer and Kentucky Enquirer, USA Today Co. publishes a variety of print and electronic periodicals in the Cincinnati area, including 16 Community Press weekly newspapers, 10 Community Recorder weekly newspapers, and OurTown magazine. The Enquirer is available online at the Cincinnati.com website. The paper has won two Pulitzer Prizes, in 1991 and 2018.

== Content ==
The Kentucky Enquirer consists of an additional section wrapped around the Cincinnati Enquirer and a remade Local section. The front page is remade from the Ohio edition, although it may contain similar elements. Reader-submitted content is featured in six zoned editions of Your HomeTown Enquirer, a local news insert published twice-weekly on Thursdays and Saturdays in Hamilton, Butler, Warren, and Clermont counties.

Since September 2015, the Enquirer and local Fox affiliate WXIX-TV have partnered on news gathering and have shared news coverage and video among the paper, broadcasts, and online media. In 2016, the Enquirer launched a true crime podcast called Accused that reached the top of iTunes' podcasts chart.

=== Politics ===
For much of its history, The Enquirer has been regarded as a conservative, Republican-leaning newspaper, in contrast to The Cincinnati Post, a former competing daily.

In the 1864 presidential election, the newspaper opposed the reelection of Abraham Lincoln. On his second inauguration the paper wrote, "Mr. Lincoln commences today, a second term unfettered by constitutional restraint as if he were the Czar of Russia or the Sultan of Turkey." From 1920 to 2012, the editorial board endorsed every Republican candidate for United States president. By contrast, the current editorial board claims to take a pragmatic editorial stance. According to then-editor Peter Bhatia, "It is made up of pragmatic, solution-driven members who, frankly, don't have much use for extreme ideologies from the right or the left. ... The board's mantra in our editorials has been about problem-solving and improving the quality of life for everyone in greater Cincinnati." On September 24, 2016, the Enquirer endorsed Hillary Clinton for president, its first endorsement of a Democrat for president since Woodrow Wilson in 1916.

== History ==
=== Early years ===
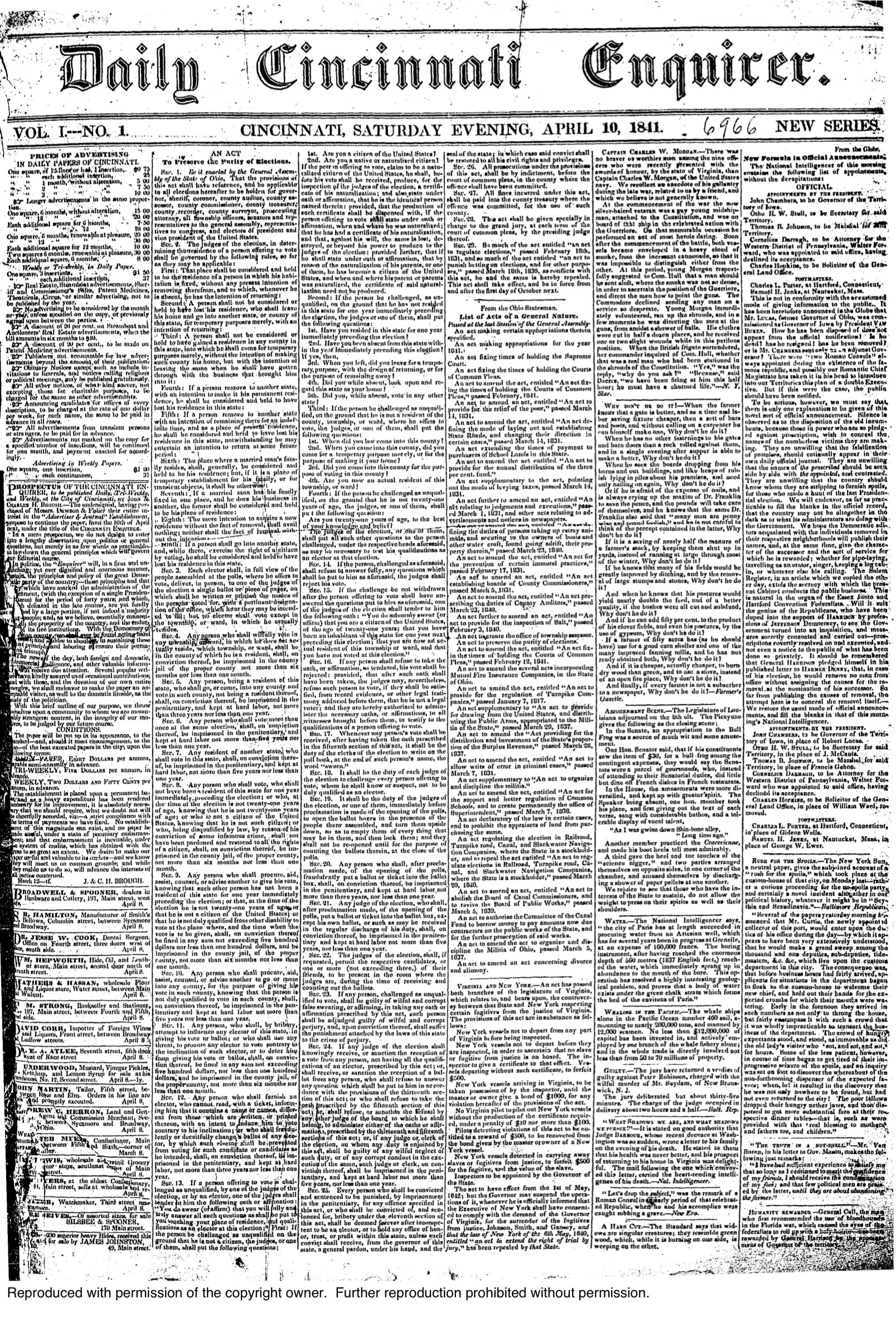
The first issue of the Daily Cincinnati Enquirer

The Enquirer's predecessor was the Phoenix, edited by Moses Dawson as early as 1828. It later became the Commercial Advertiser and in 1838 the Cincinnati Advertiser and Journal. By the time John and Charles Brough purchased it and renamed it the Daily Cincinnati Enquirer, it was considered a newspaper of record for the city. The Enquirer's first issue, on April 10, 1841, consisted of "just four pages of squint-inducing text that was, at times, as ugly in tone as it was in appearance". It declared its staunch support for the Democratic Party, in contrast to the three Whig papers and two ostensibly independent papers then in circulation. A weekly digest edition for regional farmers, the Weekly Cincinnati Enquirer, began publishing on April 14 and would continue until November 25, 1843, as The Cincinnati Weekly Enquirer.

In November 1843, the Enquirer merged with the Daily Morning Message to become the Enquirer and Message (the Daily Enquirer and Message beginning in May 1844). In January 1845, the paper dropped the Message name, becoming The Cincinnati Daily Enquirer. Finally, in May 1849, the paper became The Cincinnati Enquirer.

=== McLean ownership and Washington trust ===
In 1844, James J. Faran took an interest in the Enquirer. In 1848, Washington McLean and his brother S. B. Wiley McLean acquired an interest in the Enquirer.

On March 22, 1866, a gas leak caused Pike's Opera House to explode, taking with it the Enquirer offices next door. A competitor, the Cincinnati Daily Times, allowed the Enquirer to print on its presses in the wake of the disaster. As a result, the Enquirer missed only one day of publication. However, archives of the paper's first 25 years were lost.

Washington McLean was a leading Copperhead whose editorial policies led to the suppression of the paper by the United States government during the Civil War. After the war, McLean pursued an anti-Republican stance. One of his star writers was Lafcadio Hearn, who wrote for the paper from 1872 to 1875. James W. Faulkner served as the paper's political correspondent, covering the Ohio State Legislature and Statehouse, from 1887 until his death in 1923. The Faulkner Letter was a well-known column often carried in regional newspapers.

In the 1860s, Washington McLean bought out Faran's interest in the Enquirer. In 1872, he sold a half interest in the newspaper to his son, John Roll McLean, who assumed full ownership of the paper in 1881. He owned the paper until his death in 1916. Having little faith in his only child, Ned, John Roll McLean put the Enquirer and another paper he owned, The Washington Post, in trust with the American Security and Trust Company of Washington, D.C., as trustee. Ned successfully broke the trust regarding The Post, an action that led to its bankruptcy and eventual sale to Eugene Meyer in 1933. The Enquirer, however, continued to be held in trust until 1952.

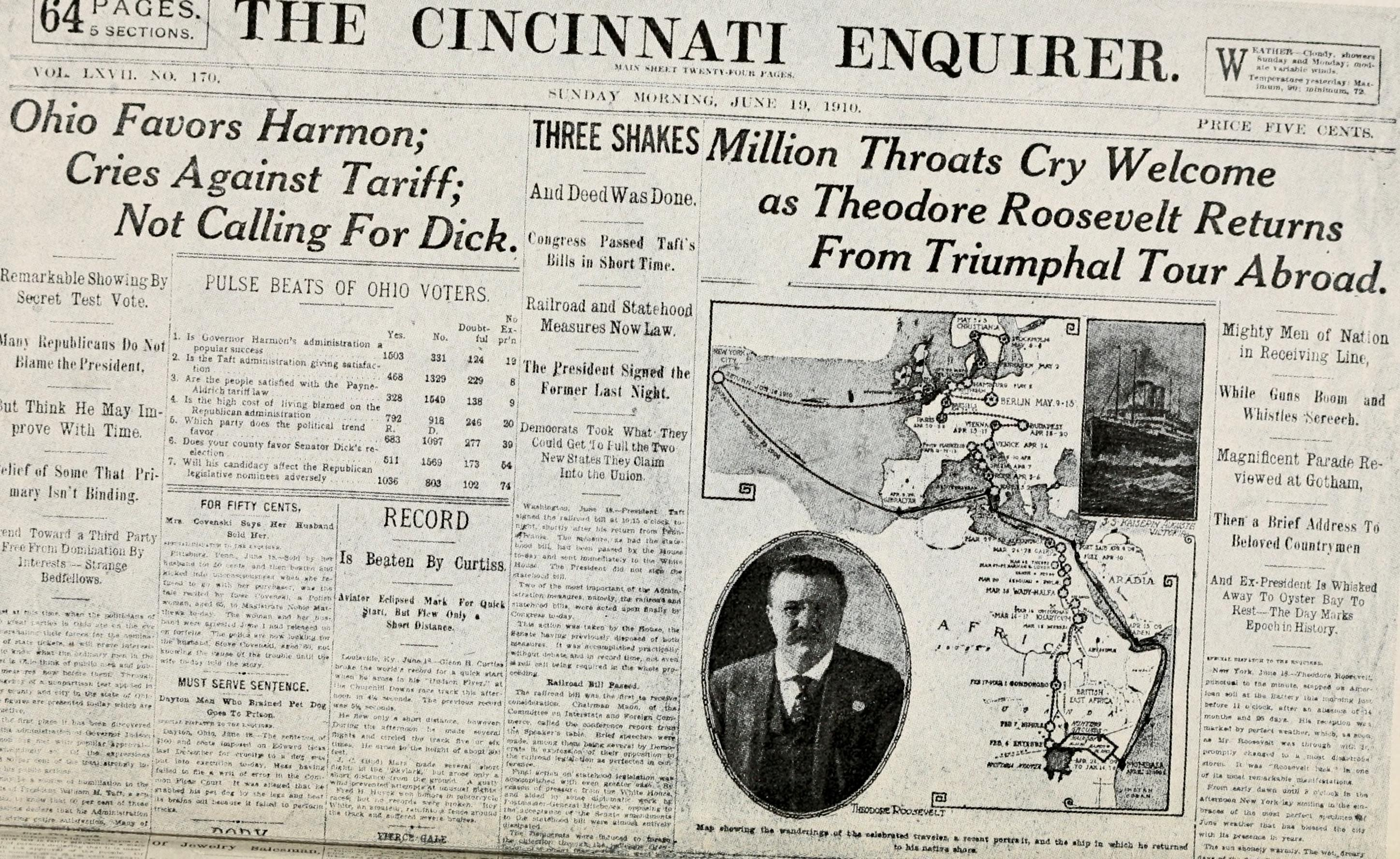
The Enquirer front page, June 19, 1910. A headline beginning with "Three shakes" is typical of the Enquirer's style during this period.

In the 1910s, the Enquirer was known for an attention-getting style of headline in which individual words or phrases cascaded vertically, beginning with a single word in large type. According to a 1912 college textbook on newspaper making, "The Enquirer has printed some masterpieces replete with a majesty of diction that is most artistic; but there are few papers that can imitate it successfully." During the 1930s and 1940s, the Enquirer was widely regarded among newspapers for its innovative and distinctive typography.

In the 1920s, the Enquirer ran a promotion that offered a free plot of land near Loveland, Ohio, along the Little Miami River, after paying for a one-year subscription to the daily. The Loveland Castle was built on two such plots. The surrounding community is now known as Loveland Park.

By the late 1940s, sales of the Enquirer, Cincinnati's last remaining morning daily, had increased dramatically, fueled in part by the success of its Sunday morning monopoly; meanwhile, The Cincinnati Post and especially The Cincinnati Times-Star faced a declining afternoon market.

=== Employee ownership ===
In February 1952, The Cincinnati Times-Star offered to buy the Enquirer from the American Security and Trust Company for $7.5 million. In response, the 845 employees of the paper pooled their assets, formed a committee, and obtained loans to successfully outbid the Times-Star with an offer of $7.6 million, with the Portsmouth Steel Company as their agent. The deal closed on June 6, 1952. In its first year under employee ownership, the Enquirer reported a net earnings of $349,421.

=== Scripps ownership ===
The employees lacked sufficient capital and managerial expertise to run the paper. City editor John F. Cronin led a revolt against management on November 25, 1955; he was fired the following month. Beset by financial problems and internal strife, they sold the paper to The E. W. Scripps Company, owner of The Cincinnati Post, on April 26, 1956. Scripps purchased a 36.5% controlling interest in the Enquirer for $4,059,000, beating out The Times-Star Company's $2,380,051 and Tribune Publishing's $15 per share, or $2,238,000. Two years later, Scripps also acquired the Times-Star, merging the afternoon paper with the Post.

With the Times-Star and Enquirer acquisitions, the Scripps family owned all of Cincinnati's dailies, along with WCPO-AM, WCPO-FM, and WCPO-TV. The E. W. Scripps Company operated the Enquirer at arm's length, even omitting the Scripps lighthouse logo from the Enquirer's nameplate. Nevertheless, the United States Department of Justice filed an antitrust suit against the company in 1964.

=== Gannett ownership and joint operating agreement ===
In 1968, Scripps entered into a consent decree to sell the Enquirer. It was sold to influential Cincinnati millionaire Carl Lindner Jr.'s American Financial Corporation on February 20, 1971. In turn, Lindner sold the Enquirer to a Phoenix-based company of his, Combined Communications, in 1975, for $30 million plus 500,000 shares of common stock and 750,000 shares of common stock warrants in Combined Communications. Combined Communications merged with Gannett Company in 1979.

On September 22, 1977, the Enquirer signed a joint operating agreement (JOA) with The Cincinnati Post. For two years, the Enquirer had secretly negotiated the terms of the JOA with the Post while securing concessions from labor unions. The two papers petitioned the Justice Department for an antitrust exemption under the Newspaper Preservation Act of 1970. This was the second JOA application under the Newspaper Preservation Act; the first, involving the Anchorage Daily News and Anchorage Times, was summarily approved but already seen as a failure.

The Enquirer–Post agreement was approved on November 26, 1979, taking effect after negotiations and legal battles with unions. As the more financially sound paper, the Enquirer received an 80% stake in the business and handled all business functions of both papers, including printing, distribution, and selling advertising. Gannett opened a new printing press off Western Avenue in the West End to print both papers.

In August 1980, William J. Keating appointed George Blake to serve as the Enquirer's first new editor since the Gannett acquisition. Blake, who was previously editor at The News-Press of Fort Myers, Florida, had a tendency to delegate that contrasted with the hands-on style of his predecessor, Luke Feck. The Enquirer underwent a staff reorganization and introduced a new format in September 1982.

Under Blake, the Enquirer had a reputation for friendliness to corporate interests, exemplified in its weak coverage of the savings and loan crisis that engulfed financier Charles Keating, brother of Enquirer publisher William J. Keating. The paper's approach changed dramatically in January 1993 with the arrival of president and publisher Harry Whipple and editor Lawrence Beaupre from Gannett Suburban Newspapers in White Plains, New York. Beaupre emphasized investigative reporting, beginning with aggressive coverage of Charles Keating's conviction. By 1995, he had brought his team of aggressive investigative reporters from White Plains to the Enquirer. The paper won awards for Michael Gallagher's 1996 investigation into Fluor Daniel's cleanup of the uranium processing plant at Fernald Feed Materials Production Center.

On May 3, 1998, the Enquirer published a special 18-page section, titled "Chiquita Secrets Revealed", that accused the Cincinnati-based fruit company of labor abuses, polluting, bribery, and other misdeeds. Chiquita, owned by former Enquirer owner Lindner, denied all of the allegations. Gallagher was charged and convicted for illegally obtaining some of the evidence through voicemail hacking, and the Enquirer fired him for lying about his sources. Faced with a potential lawsuit over the voicemail hacking, the Enquirer settled with Chiquita out of court, paying the company $14 million. Under the terms of the agreement, the paper published an unprecedented three-day-long, front-page retraction of the entire series, destroyed any evidence they had gathered against Chiquita, and transferred Beaupre to Gannett headquarters. The paper largely reverted to its former approach to business coverage.

On April 10, 2000, the Enquirer and Post downsized from a traditional 12 5/16-inch-wide (313 mm) broadsheet format to an 11 5/8-inch-wide (300 mm) format similar to Berliner. They also began publishing in color every day of the week. Gannett promoted the narrower format as being "easier to handle, hold, and read" but also cited reduced newsprint costs.

In May 2003, Gannett replaced Harry Whipple with Cincinnati native Margaret E. Buchanan as president and publisher. Buchanan, previously publisher of the Idaho Statesman, was the newspaper's first woman publisher. The same year, Tom Callinan became editor of the Enquirer after stints as editor of The Arizona Republic, the Democrat and Chronicle of Rochester, New York, and the Lansing State Journal. One of his first moves was to reassign media critics to reporting positions.

Callinan originally attempted to address declining circulation by focusing on lifestyle content aimed at younger readers; however, this approach alienated the paper's older core audience. The paper responded by reemphasizing national news in the newspaper and creating niche, crowdsourced products online for younger audiences. In October 2003, The Enquirer began publishing and distributing CiN Weekly, a free lifestyle magazine aimed at younger readers, to compete against Cincinnati CityBeat. In 2004, Gannett purchased local magazines Design and Inspire and increased coverage in The Kentucky Enquirer. In November 2004, Gannett purchased HomeTown Communications Network, publisher of a daily newspaper and 62 weekly and biweekly newspapers branded The Community Press in Ohio and The Community Recorder in Kentucky. The Department of Justice cleared the purchase the following March.

In January 2004, the Enquirer informed the Post of its intention to let the JOA expire. The Post published its final print edition upon the JOA's expiration on December 31, 2007, leaving the Enquirer as the only daily newspaper in Greater Cincinnati and Northern Kentucky. Following the Post's closure, the Enquirer made efforts to appeal to The Kentucky Post's former readership, for example referring to the Cincinnati metropolitan area as "Greater Cincinnati and Northern Kentucky" rather than simply "Greater Cincinnati".

In April 2006, The Enquirer was cited by The Associated Press with the news cooperative's General Excellence Award, naming The Enquirer as the best major daily newspaper in Ohio. Earlier that year, parent Gannett Co. named The Enquirer the most improved of the more than 100 newspapers in the chain.

In December 2010, Callinan left for a professorship at the University of Cincinnati and was succeeded by Carolyn Washburn as editor.

In October 2012, the online version of the Enquirer went behind a metered paywall.

In March 2013, Gannett closed its West End printing facility and contracted with The Columbus Dispatch to print the Enquirer in Columbus. Shortly after, the Enquirer began publishing in a smaller compact tabloid format. Former Post and Enquirer pressman Al Bamberger purchased the former Enquirer facility that June and sold it to Wegman Company, an office furniture installation company.

Buchanan retired in March 2015. Gannett named Rick Green, the editor of The Des Moines Register and a former Enquirer assistant editor, as president and publisher. In August 2016, Gannett eliminated the Enquirer's Publisher position, transferring Green to the North Jersey Media Group in New Jersey.

On March 5, 2022, the Enquirer moved to a six-day printing schedule, eliminating its printed Saturday edition.

The paper's photographic archive, covering the years 1945 to 1995, was donated to the Cincinnati and Hamilton County Public Library in 2023.

== Facilities ==
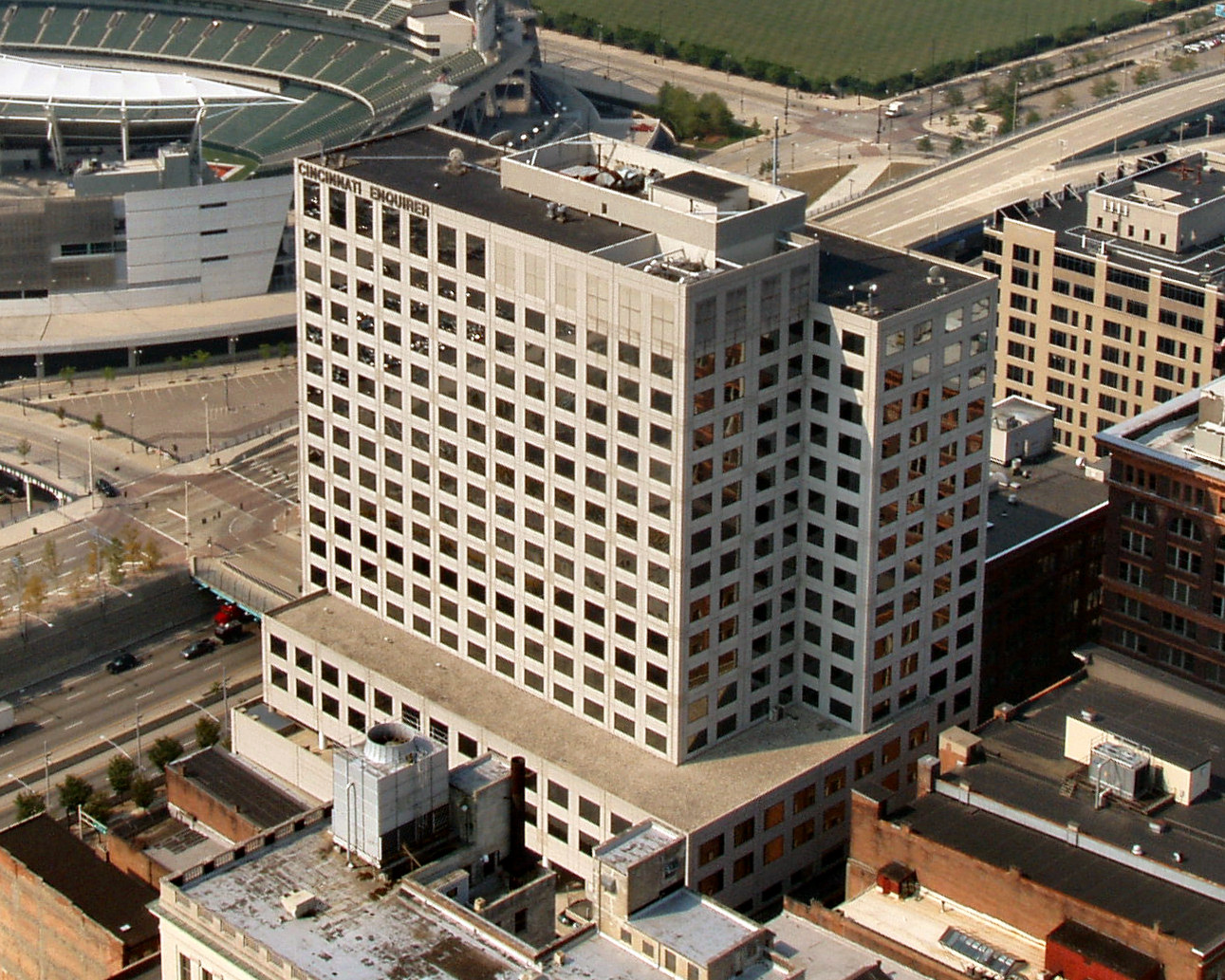
Former Cincinnati Enquirer headquarters building (1992–2022) at 312 Elm Street

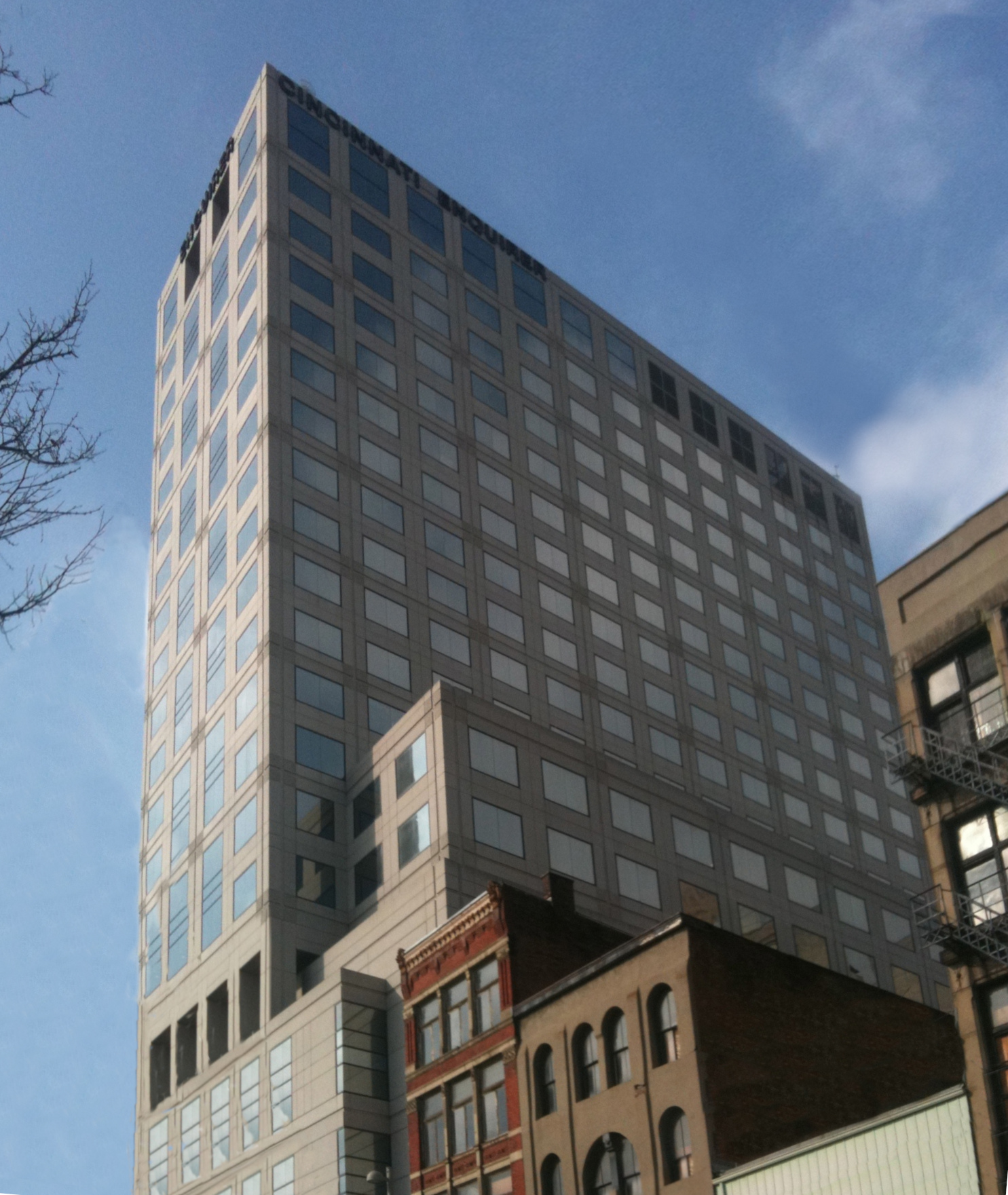
Former Cincinnati Enquirer Building at Third and Elm streets

The Enquirer has published from many downtown Cincinnati locations. From Fifth Street between Main and Sycamore, it moved to Third Street, then to the corner of Third and Main, then to Main between Third and Pearl. In 1866, the Enquirer began publishing from offices in the 600 block of Vine Street, near Baker Street. From 1916 to 1928, the newspaper constructed a new headquarters and printing plant, the Cincinnati Enquirer Building, on this property. In 1992, the newspaper moved to 312 Elm Street.

At the end of 2022, the newspaper's 30-year lease agreement at Elm Street expired, and the Enquirer's news operation moved one block west, to 312 Plum Street.

The Enquirer operated two news bureaus until July 2013. The Northern Kentucky bureau produced The Kentucky Enquirer and The Community Recorder, while the West Chester bureau covered Butler and Warren counties for The Cincinnati Enquirer's northern zones and produced some editions of The Community Press.

From 1977 to 2013, the Enquirer was printed from a 130,000-square-foot (12,000 m^{2}) press off Western Avenue in the West End. Until 2007, this facility also printed The Cincinnati Post under a joint operating agreement. Since March 2013, Gannett has contracted with The Columbus Dispatch in Columbus to print all its Cincinnati publications, including the Enquirer. Similarly, Gannett has contracted with the Lafayette, Indiana, Journal & Courier to print Community Press and Community Recorder editions since 2007.

== Online presence ==
The Enquirer launched its first website, Enquirer.com, on November 1, 1996. Due to a joint operating agreement with The Cincinnati Post, it launched concurrently with the Post's site, @The Post. A shared website, GoCincinnati!, located at gocinci.net, displayed classified advertising and offered dial-up Internet access subscriptions. Local access numbers were available in cities throughout the country through a network of Gannett publications. Both papers' home pages moved to a more memorable domain, Cincinnati.com, on November 1, 1998. The new brand encompassed about 300 local commercial sites and some community organizations.

From May 2002 to March 2007, Cincinnati.com also included WCPO.com, the website of Post sister company WCPO-TV. The Post closed at the end of 2007, ending Scripps' involvement in Cincinnati.com. The CiN Weekly, Community Press, and Community Recorder weekly newspapers have also been online partners with the Enquirer.

In October 2005, the Enquirer launched NKY.com, a website covering news from Boone, Campbell, and Kenton counties in Northern Kentucky. NKY.com was one of the first newspaper-published websites to make extensive use of user-created content, which it featured prominently on 38 community pages. In August 2006, Cincinnati.com launched 186 community pages covering towns and neighborhoods in Ohio and Indiana and began soliciting and publishing stories and articles from readers, which appear in Your Hometown Enquirer inserts.

Former Cincinnati.com logo

Since October 2012, Cincinnati.com has operated behind a metered paywall that allows readers to view 10 stories a month before paying a subscription fee. As a Gannett property, Cincinnati.com is branded as "part of the USA Today Network". Its primary competitor in the market is WCPO-TV's website, WCPO.com.

Archives of Enquirer articles can be found in online subscription databases. ProQuest contains full text of articles from 1841 to 1922 and from 1999 to present, as well as "digital microfilm" of articles from 2010 to 2012. As of September 2016, Newspapers.com has scans of 4.2 million pages from 1841 to present.

== Awards ==
The Enquirer won its first Pulitzer Prize in 1991 for Jim Borgman's editorial cartoons.

Under then-editor Peter Bhatia, the Enquirer became the first newsroom in the nation to dedicate a reporter to covering the heroin epidemic full time. That reporter, Terry DeMio, and reporter Dan Horn helped lead a staff of about 60 journalists to report the heroin project, "Seven Days of Heroin", that won the newspaper its second Pulitzer Prize in 2018.

== Notable people ==
Former employees and contributors:

- Lee Allen – baseball historian
- Peter Bhatia – newspaper editor
- Roy Beck – anti–illegal immigration activist
- Jim Borgman – Pulitzer Prize–winning editorial cartoonist
- O. P. Caylor – baseball columnist
- George Randolph Chester – writer
- James M. Cox – Governor of Ohio, U.S. Representative, and U.S. presidential candidate
- Harry M. Daugherty – U.S. Attorney General
- Timothy C. Day – U.S. Representative
- Jerry Dowling – cartoonist
- James W. Faulkner – political journalist
- Suzanne Fournier – Chief of Public Affairs for the U.S. Army Corps of Engineers
- Michael Gallagher – investigative journalist
- Edward Gallenstein – magazine editor
- Sloane Gordon – political writer
- Murat Halstead – newspaper editor
- Lafcadio Hearn – writer
- Amber Hunt – crime author
- Rudolph K. Hynicka – Cincinnati politician affiliated with Boss Cox
- Peter King – sportswriter
- Winsor McCay – cartoonist and animator
- Robert D. McFadden – journalist
- John McIntyre – copy editor
- Charles Murphy – owner of the Chicago Cubs
- Terence Moore – sports journalist
- David Philipson – Reform rabbi and orator
- Jacob J. Rosenthal – theater manager
- Frederick Bushnell "Jack" Ryder – football coach and sportswriter
- Al Schottelkotte – WCPO-TV news anchor
- Robert F. Schulkers – author
- Bill Thomas – author
- Whitney Tower – horse racing reporter
- Lawson Wulsin – professor of psychiatry and family medicine

Former Enquirer owners and publishers:

- Francis L. Dale – publisher
- James J. Faran – owner and associate editor; U.S. Representative
- William J. Keating – CEO and publisher; U.S. Representative
- Carl Lindner Jr. – owner
- John Roll McLean – publisher
- Washington McLean – owner
- Carolyn Washburn – Enquirer editor
