= Carolyn Washburn =

American journalist

Carolyn Washburn is an American journalist who was the vice president and editor of The Cincinnati Enquirer until May 2015. Previously she was the vice president and editor of The Des Moines Register. She was also the executive editor of Idaho Statesman until 1999.

Washburn began her career in journalism in 1984 at the Lansing State Journal as a business reporter Covering Oldsmobile, General Motors and the United Auto Workers. She was promoted to business editor. She moved to the Rochester Democrat and Chronicle in 1987 covering Eastman Kodak Co.

== Awards ==
- 2010: The Des Moines Register won the Pulitzer Prize for Breaking News Photography. Washburn won Gannett Chairmans Ring.
- 2009: Washburn was first runner up for Gannett Editor of the Year.
- 2008: Washburn was named Gannett Editor of the Year.

== Des Moines Register presidential debates ==
Washburn received both harsh criticism and praise for how she moderated the 2007 Des Moines Register Republican presidential debate. She was criticized for controlling the pace of the debate and for her lengthy introductory remarks. The Iowa Independent wrote that the debate "was a train wreck, difficult for even the most ardent political junkie to watch. What seemed like a good idea on paper - avoiding over-discussed, politically charged topics about Iraq and immigration reform and forcing candidates to keep their answers succinct - actually made me yearn for a surreal surprise a la the YouTube debates." The Wall Street Journal wrote that Washburn treated the Republican candidates "like schoolchildren." Also, when she asked the Republican candidates to raise their hands if they believed climate change was caused by humans, Fred Thompson asked to explain his position and his request was denied. But The Baltimore Sun said: "Editor Carolyn Washburn is running a tight debate ship: No questions about the war or immigration. Just big-think questions." Politico, a new Web entry in political coverage, was impressed. "Carolyn Washburn, editor of the Des Moines Register, asked all the questions and did so in a manner that suggests she believes a presidential debate should be more about information than entertainment,'' Roger Simon says. "That is a staggering concept and one that some reporters may not have liked - there were few of the fireworks that fuel juicy story lines - but I have a feeling serious voters, which the Iowans who vote on caucus night are, got a lot out of it."
