= Amber Hunt (journalist) =

American journalist, podcaster, and author (born 1978)

- Born: August 26, 1978 (age 47)
- Education: Wayne State University
- Occupations: Journalist, podcaster, author
- Years active: 1996–present
- Employer: Grab Bag Collab
- Known for: True crime reporting
- Notable work: Accused, Crimes of the Centuries, What If They're Wrong: After the Accusation (podcast)
- Spouse: Elijah Van Benschoten 2012-2022
- Website: reporteramber.com

Amber Hunt (born August 26, 1978) is an American journalist, podcaster, and author known for reporting on true crime.

She is the host and co-creator of three true crime podcasts, Accused, Aftermath, and Crimes of the Centuries and has published multiple true crime books. As of February 2020, she worked as an investigative reporter at The Cincinnati Enquirer. She left the newspaper in early 2025.

== Career ==
After covering local news at small papers in Iowa and Michigan, Hunt was hired at the Detroit Free Press, where she covered crime for nearly eight years. In 2005, she won the Al Nakkula Award for Police Reporting from the University of Colorado at Boulder. In 2007 and 2008, she appeared on NBC's Dateline program, first in an episode called "The Valentine's Day Mystery" and then in "Disappearance at the Dairy Queen" (later renamed "The Case of the Girl Who Never Came Home.")

Hunt's fourth book, released in December 2014, was The Kennedy Wives: Triumph and Tragedy in America's Most Public Family, co-written with longtime friend David Batcher. The book was a New York Times and Wall Street Journal bestseller.

In 2024, Hunt published a book based on her podcast Crimes of the Centuries. The book shared the podcast's title, with the subhead "The Cases That Changed Us." It was published by Union Square.

Hunt's first true crime book was Dead But Not Forgotten, released in August 2010, which examined the 1990 murder of Barbara George, a 32-year-old mother of two whose husband Michael was arrested in 2007 for the suburban Detroit shooting. Hunt's book, released prior to Michael George's second trial in the case, was accused of undermining the prosecution's key witness. In Hunt's acknowledgments, she dedicated the book to her mother, who she wrote died of cancer when she was 12.

In 2010, Hunt was named a Knight-Wallace Fellow at the University of Michigan. The same year, she was nominated as a Livingston Young Journalist for a series of stories written in 2010 about crime in the streets of Detroit. In August 2011, Hunt's second true crime book All-American Murder was released. The book covered the alleged beating death of Yeardley Love, whose on-again, off-again boyfriend George Huguely V was charged in Love's May 2010 death. She was set to have two non-fiction book releases in 2014: a true-crime account about the 2011 murders of Blake and Mary Jo Hadley, who were bludgeoned to death by their 17-year-old son, Tyler Hadley, in Port St. Lucie, Florida, and the book on the Kennedy family wives. Hunt is also a photographer. Referencing the question "Why are you drawn to crime?" during a talk for House of SpeakEasy's Seriously Entertaining program, Hunt said, "I'm not. I actually am repulsed by crime. It just so happens that I'm kind of good at covering crime. I think it's because I'm empathetic. And we all want to do something with our lives that we're good at, right?"

In August 2011, the Associated Press announced its hiring of Hunt as news editor overseeing North and South Dakota. In July 2013, she left the AP to become an investigative reporter with The Cincinnati Enquirer. In June 2014, See How Much You Love Me: A Troubled Teen, His Devoted Parents, and a Cold-Blooded Killing was released by St. Martin's true crime imprint. Hunt began teaching a journalism course at the University of Cincinnati in 2015. In 2016, Hunt began a podcast called Accused, which was a critical and popular success that reached No. 1 on iTunes' list of podcasts. In 2017, a second season of Accused was released. It focused on the 1987 murder of Retha Welch and the wrongful conviction of William Virgil. In 2018, she also reported and narrated a podcast called Aftermath about gun violence in America She returned to Accused for its third season, which ran from late December 2019 through January 2020. That season focused on the mysterious death of Dave Bocks in a uranium processing plant. The final season of Accused covered the case against Elwood Jones, who spent nearly 30 years on death row in Ohio after being convicted of the 1994 murder of Rhoda Nathan in her Blue Ash hotel room. The case had been covered on the TV show Forensic Files. Hunt and partner Amanda Rossmann's reporting helped lead to Jones' conviction being overturned. Hunt and Rossmann announced in June 2025 that Accused's owner, Gannett, discontinued the show. Hunt is continuing the work under a new brand, What If They're Wrong: After the Accusation. Its first episode updated Jones' case.

In April 2018, a photograph of Hunt depicted her celebrating with the Enquirer newsroom for its Pulitzer Prize win in the local reporting category. Hunt was among more than 60 journalists whose work on a project titled "Seven Days of Heroin" won the award. The project had been spearheaded by Enquirer editor Peter Bhatia, who left that newsroom for the Detroit Free Press in August 2017.

Hunt announced on social media she left her 30-year career in daily newspapers in February 2025 to focus on her podcast Crimes of the Centuries, which was entering its fifth season. She also co-runs Grab Bag Collab, a subscription-based podcast network that hosts multiple shows, including Shut the F*** Up, Nick Lachey with hosts Daisy Eagan and Ellyn Marsh, Dear Daisy with Eagan, Other People's Problems with host Rebecca Lavoie of Crime Writers On, More Like Ancient Failiens with hosts Toby Ball and Brandon R. Reynolds, and The Catalyst, with host Hunt.
