= Accused (podcast) =

True crime podcast

- Genre: True crime
- Language: English

Creative team
- Created by: Amber Hunt; Amanda Rossmann

Cast and voices
- Narrated by: Amber Hunt

Production
- Production: The Cincinnati Enquirer

Publication
- No. of seasons: 4
- No. of episodes: 36
- Original release: September 7, 2016
- Provider: Wondery

Reception
- Ratings: 4.375/5, 4.5/5

Related
- Related shows: Aftermath, What If They're Wrong? After the Accusation, Crimes of the Centuries
- Website: reporteramber.com

Accused is a true crime investigative journalism podcast created by Cincinnati Enquirer reporter Amber Hunt and photographer Amanda Rossmann. As of 2025, four seasons have been published, each of which analyzes a different suspicious death case. By the conclusion of Season 4, the podcast had been downloaded 45 million times and reached No. 1 on iTunes' podcast chart.

== History ==

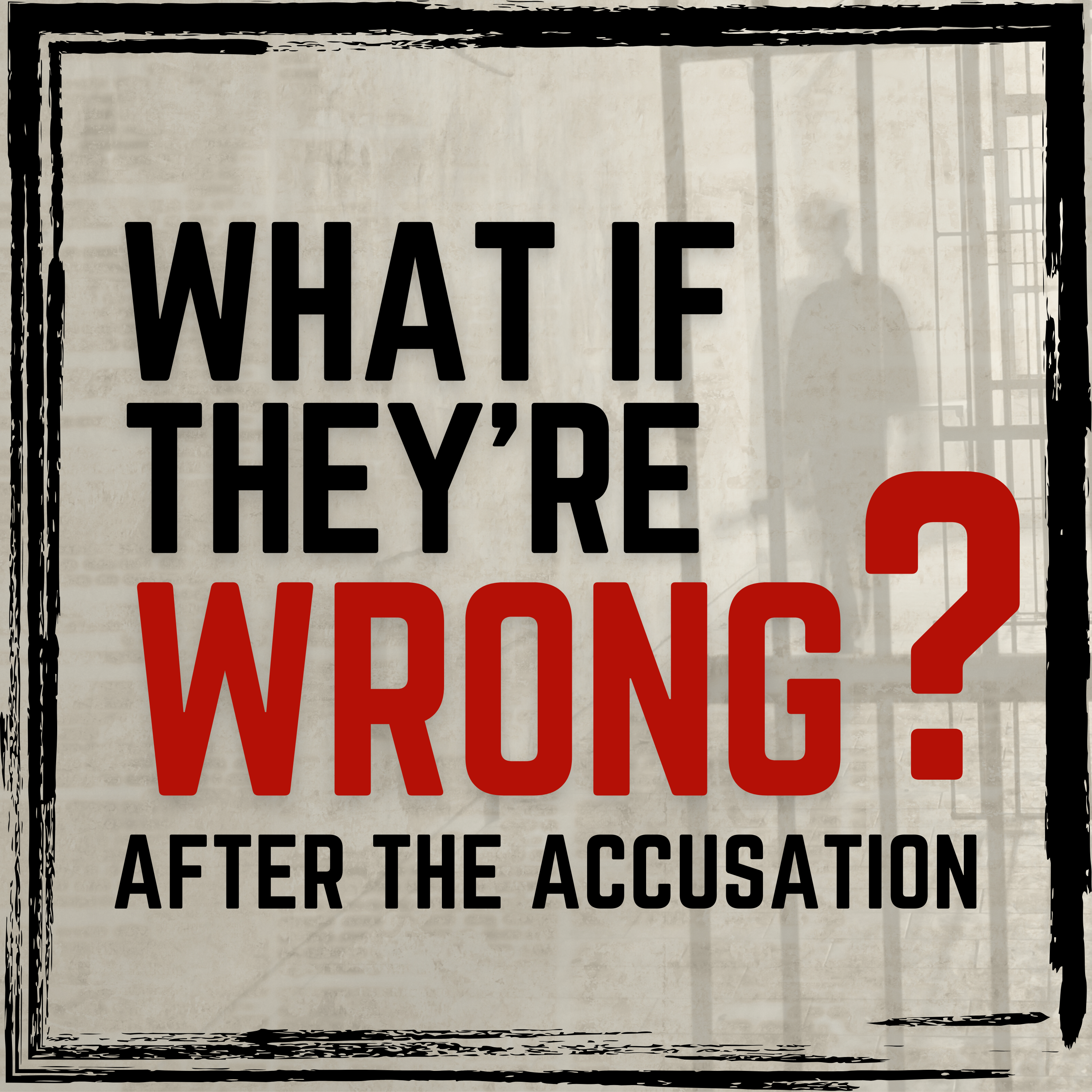
Logo for "What If They're Wrong? After the Accusation"

=== Season 1 ===
The first season focused on the murder of Elizabeth Andes, a 23-year-old Miami University graduate, who was stabbed to death on December 28, 1978. Andes' boyfriend Bob Young had found her body and was immediately questioned in her death. After 15 hours of interrogation, including being given a lie detector test that he was told he failed, Young confessed to the murder. He immediately recanted, saying that Hamilton County Lt. Richard Carpenter, the polygraph administrator, had "scared the hell out of me." Young faced a murder trial the following spring but was acquitted by the jury. In 1981, Young was tried again for Andes' death in civil court after Andes' family sued him for wrongful death. He was found not liable by the jury. Accused presented three other acquaintances of Andes' who were not seriously investigated at the time by police in Oxford, Ohio.

Season 1, which was originally published under the title Accused: The Unsolved Murder of Elizabeth Andes, premiered on September 7, 2016. It originally ran for eight episodes, concluding on September 28. A ninth episode titled "The Update" was released on December 26. The transcripts for the first season were released in September 2018 as a book from Diversion Books.

=== Season 2 ===
Season 2 focused on the 1987 murder of Retha Welch, a 54-year-old grandmother and prison minister. She was found beaten to death in the bathtub of her Newport, Kentucky apartment. An acquaintance named William Virgil was convicted in her murder, but his conviction was overturned after DNA testing found his semen was not among three samples found inside of the victim at the time of her death.

The second season premiered on October 12, 2017, and ran for eight episodes, concluding on November 2.

=== Season 3 ===
Hunt and Rossmann announced on social media in summer 2018 that they were working on a third season of Accused. Season 3 premiered on December 3, 2019, and ran for eight episodes (plus two bonus episodes), concluding on January 28, 2020. It focused on the 1984 death of Dave Bocks, a pipe fitter who worked at a controversial uranium processing plant in Fernald, Ohio. Police determined that Bocks jump or dove into a vat of molten salt kept at 1,350 degrees Fahrenheit. An experiment conducted by the podcast found it would have been incredibly difficult, if not impossible, for a man his size to enter through the available 9-inch-by-22-inch opening on top of the vat.

=== Season 4 ===
The fourth season of Accused, which aired in early 2022, focused on the murder of New Jersey resident Rhoda Nathan, who was killed in her Ohio hotel room in 1994. An employee of the hotel, the Blue Ash Embassy Suites, was arrested in 1995, the primary evidence against him being a cut on his hand that authorities said came from punching Nathan in the mouth during the deadly struggle, and the pendant of a necklace an officer said he found in a toolbox in the suspect's car. The suspect, Elwood Jones, spent nearly 30 years on death row. Hunt and Rossmann's reporting highlighted questionable expert testimony about the "fight-bite" evidence and concerns about the necklace supposedly found in Jones' trunk. In December 2022, a Hamilton County judge overturned the conviction. The judge said that police and prosecutors illegally withheld nearly 4,000 investigatory documents from Jones' original defense lawyer, and also found that new evidence presented in a summer 2022 hearing was credible enough to warrant a new trial. Hamilton County prosecutors appealed the ruling to the Supreme Court of Ohio.

=== Awards ===
Awards
Award	Date	Category	Result	Ref.
Edward R. Murrow Awards	2017	News Documentary (Regional)	Won	
Edward R. Murrow Awards	2017	Investigative Reporting (Regional)	Won	
Press Club of Cleveland	2018	Best Podcast	Won	
Webby Awards	2017	Best Writing	Nominated	
Webby Awards	2018	Documentary	Honoree	
Webby Awards	2020	Best Series	Honoree	

== See also ==
- List of American crime podcasts
