= John R. McLean (publisher) =

American businessman (1848–1916)

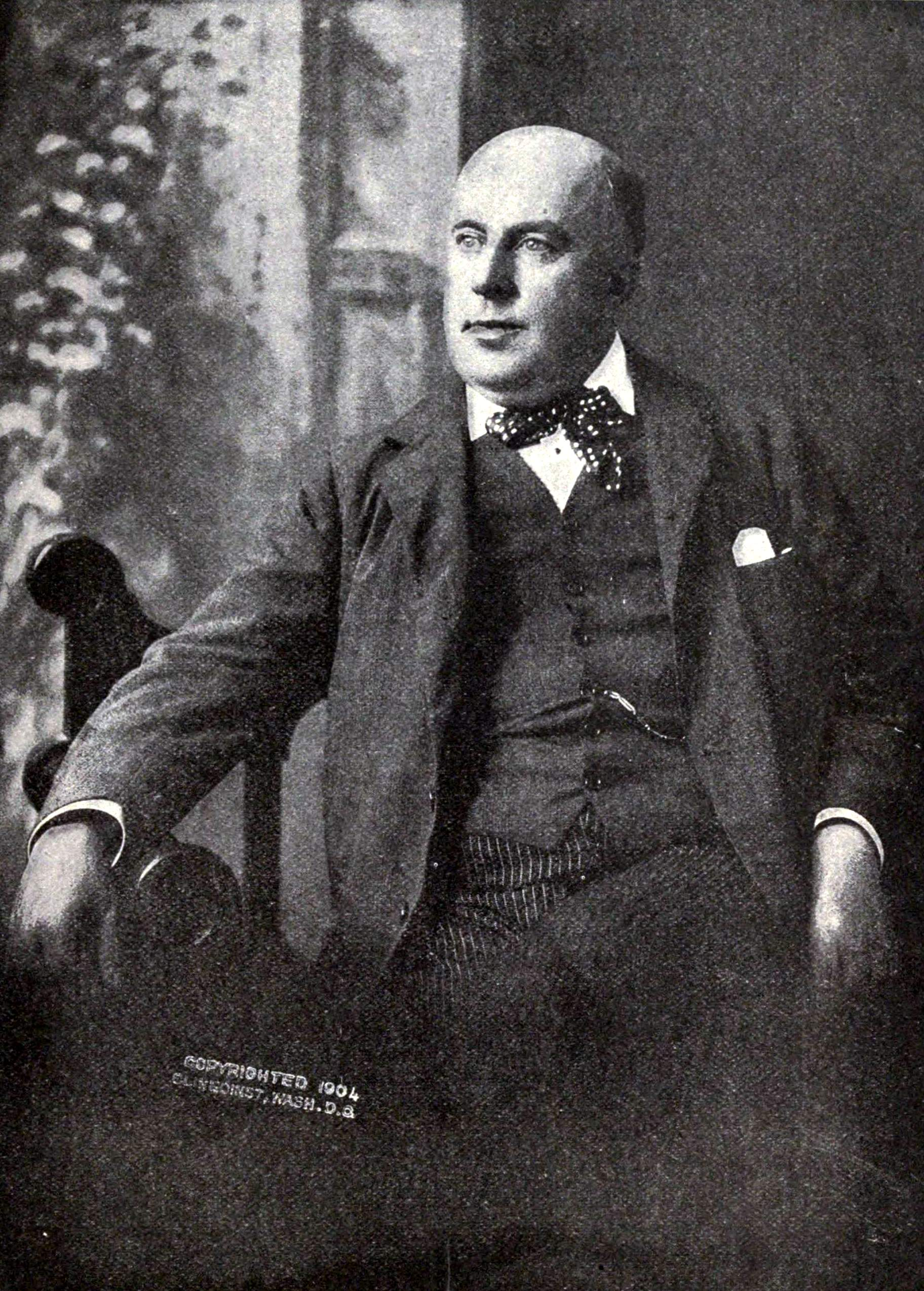
- Born: John Roll McLean; September 17, 1848; Cincinnati, Ohio, U.S.
- Died: June 9, 1916 (aged 67); McLean Gardens, Washington, DC, U.S.
- Burial place: Rock Creek Cemetery
- Education: Harvard University, Heidelberg University
- Political party: Democratic
- Children: Edward Beale McLean

John Roll McLean (September 17, 1848 – June 9, 1916) was an American businessman and politician who was the owner and publisher of The Washington Post and The Cincinnati Enquirer, and part owner of two professional baseball teams. He is the namesake of McLean, Virginia.

== Early life and family ==
McLean was born in Cincinnati on September 17, 1848, to Mary and Washington McLean. His sister, Mildred, was the wife of General William Babcock Hazen and Admiral George Dewey. He married Emily Beale and they had one son, Edward Beale McLean.

McLean attended public schools in Cincinnati and attended Harvard University and Heidelberg University.

== Career ==
After graduation from Heidelberg University, McLean began working at his father's newspaper, The Cincinnati Enquirer, eventually becoming editor. He acquired his father's interest in the paper in 1873.

By the 1880s, McLean was a prominent businessperson who owned a wide variety of newspaper, real estate, and transportation holdings. In 1895, McLean purchased the New York Morning Journal, but within six months, he sold the paper to William Randolph Hearst.

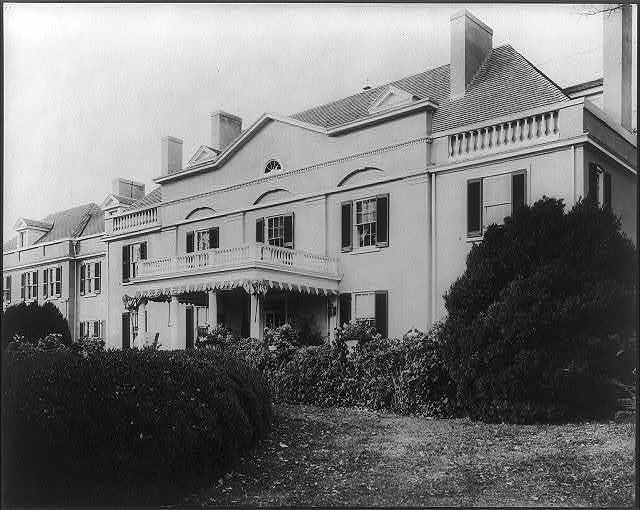
McLean's "Friendship" estate, located in Washington, D.C., built in 1898.

By the early 1900s, he was the owner and publisher of The Washington Post and The Cincinnati Enquirer, and was also a partner in the ownership of the Cincinnati Red Stockings baseball team of the American Association and the Cincinnati Outlaw Reds of the Union Association.

McLean also was a stockholder in street railway companies, including the Capital Traction Company, and owned the controlling stock in the Washington Gas Light Company. In addition to his holdings, McLean was an elected director of the American Security and Trust Company and Riggs National Bank.

In 1904, he and Senator Stephen Benton Elkins built the Great Falls and Old Dominion Railroad. One of McLean's last business ventures was the development of fluorite mines in Illinois.

=== Political activism ===
McLean was a long-time delegate to the Democratic National Committee, representing the state of Ohio at Democratic national conventions of 1884, 1888, 1892, 1896, and 1900. He was a candidate for the United States Senate in 1885 and received the Democratic Party's nomination for the Ohio governor's seat in 1899. He lost both elections.

At the 1896 Democratic Nation Convention in Chicago, McLean received fifty-four votes on the first ballot for the U.S. Presidential nomination, and advanced to the fourth round, receiving 207 total votes. He declined the Vice Presidential nomination. Despite this, he advanced to the fifth round of balloting with 809 total votes.

== Death and legacy ==
McLean died on June 9, 1916, aged 67. He is buried at Rock Creek Cemetery.

At the time of his death, his estate was valued at around $25 million which in 2023 would be valued at approximately $700 million; inflation-adjusted.

McLean, Virginia, which grew up around the railroad he established, is named for him. His former 70-acre summer estate, Friendship, is now McLean Gardens.

Party political offices
| Preceded by Horace L. Chapman | Democratic Party nominee for Governor of Ohio; 1899 | Succeeded by James Kilbourne |
