= 1899 Ohio gubernatorial election =

- November 2, 1899
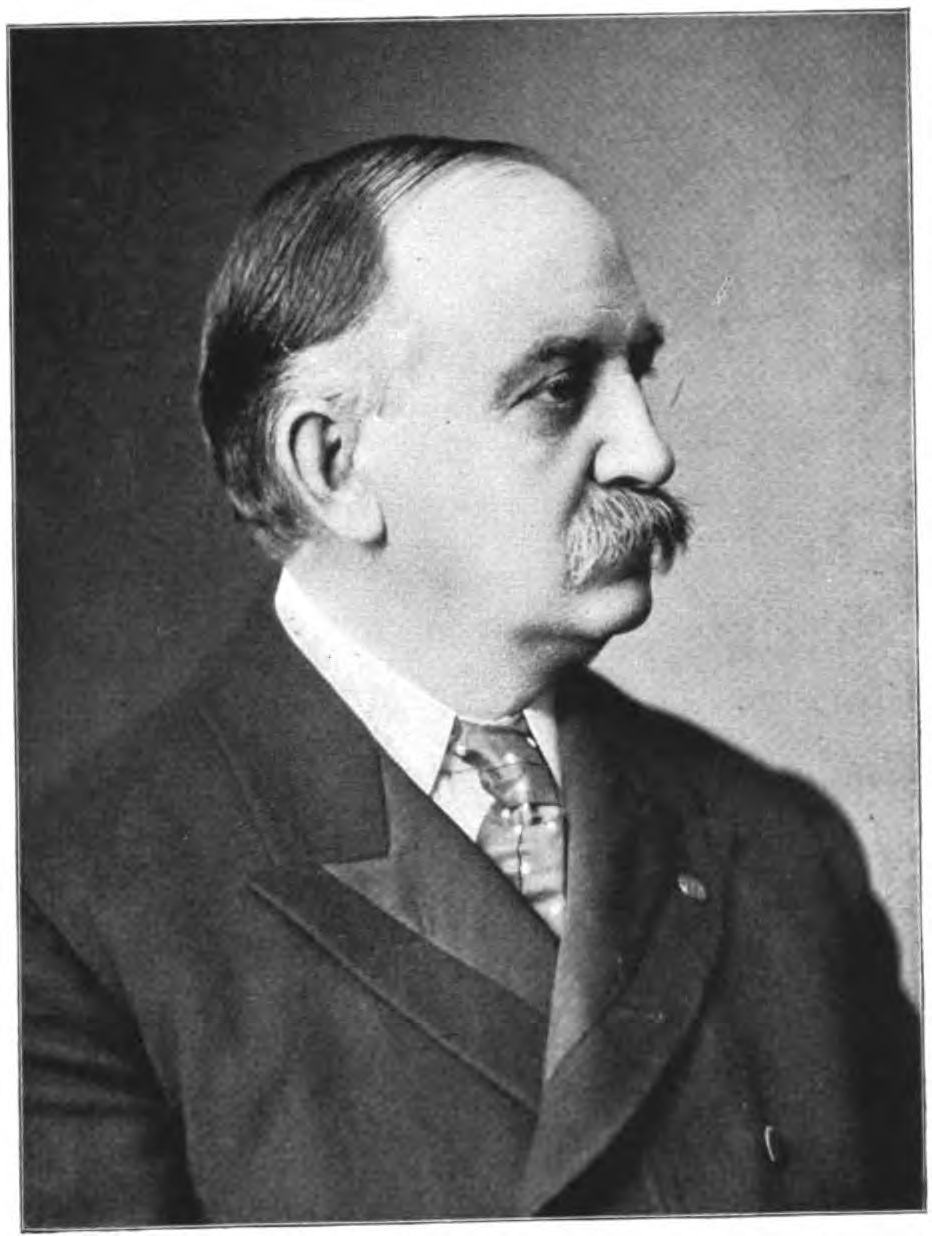

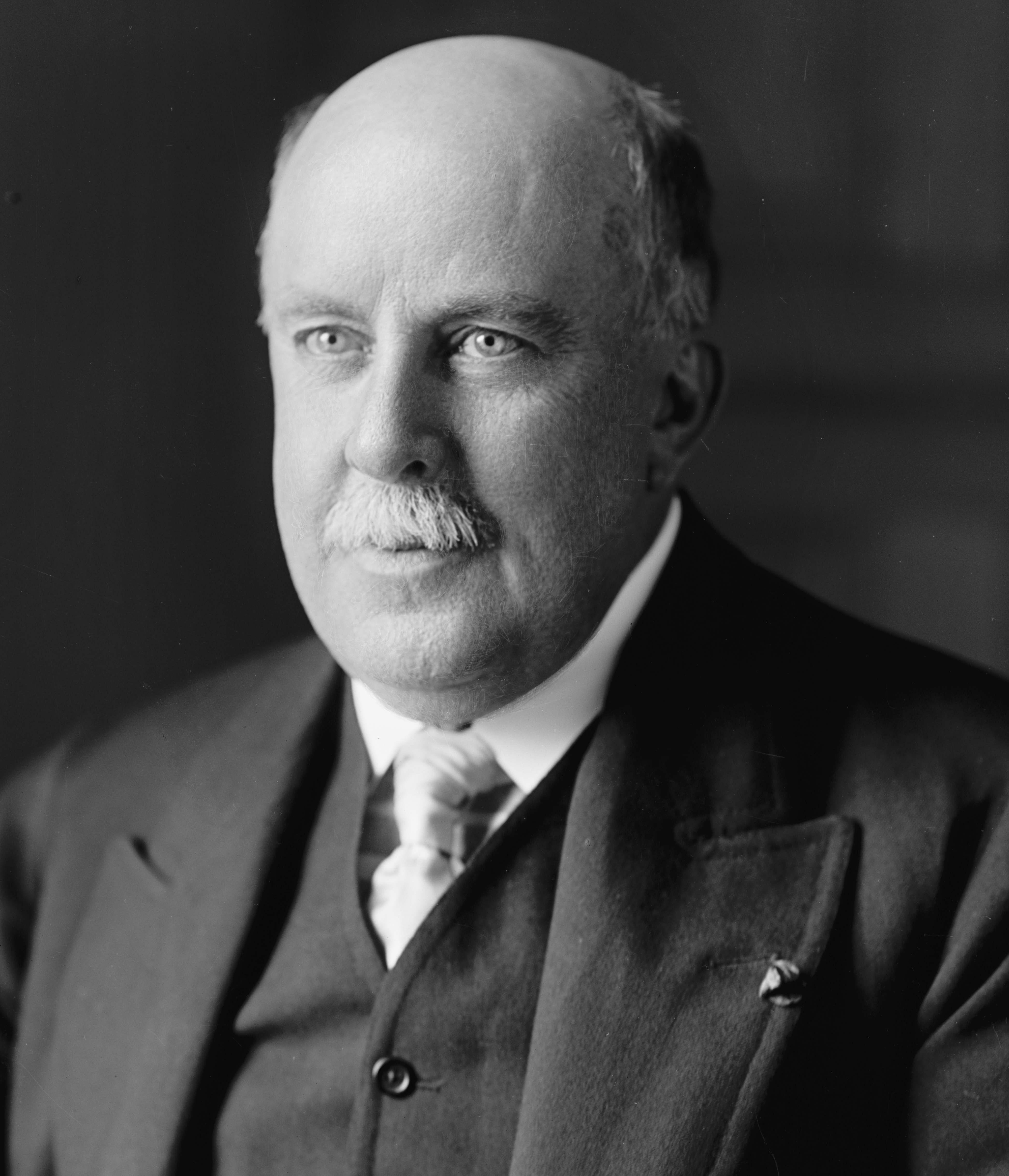

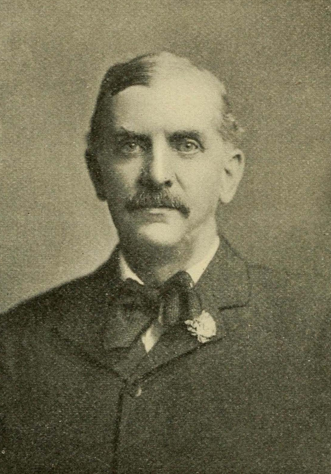
Nominee	George K. Nash	John R. McLean	Samuel M. Jones
Party	Republican	Democratic	Independent
Popular vote	417,199	368,176	106,721
Percentage	45.94%	40.54%	11.75%
- County results Nash: 40–50% 50–60% 60–70% McLean: 40–50% 50–60% 60–70% Jones: 30–40% 50–60%
Governor before election
Asa S. Bushnell
Republican
Elected Governor
George K. Nash
Republican

The 1899 Ohio gubernatorial election was held on November 2, 1899. Republican nominee George K. Nash defeated Democratic nominee John R. McLean with 45.94% of the vote.

== General election ==
=== Candidates ===
Major party candidates

- George K. Nash, Republican
- John R. McLean, Democratic

Other candidates

- Samuel M. Jones, Independent
- Seth H. Ellis, Union Reform
- George M. Hammell, Prohibition
- Robert Bandlow, Socialist Labor

=== Results ===
1899 Ohio gubernatorial election
Party	Candidate	Votes	%	±%
Republican	George K. Nash	417,199	45.94%	
Democratic	John R. McLean	368,176	40.54%	
Independent	Samuel M. Jones	106,721	11.75%	
Independent	Seth H. Ellis	7,799	0.86%	
Prohibition	George M. Hammell	5,825	0.64%	
Socialist Labor	Robert Bandlow	2,439	0.27%	
Majority		49,023		
Turnout				
Republican hold		Swing		
