= Michael Gallagher (journalist) =

American newspaper editor

Michael Gallagher (born c. 1958) is an American newspaper editor. Gallagher was formerly an investigative journalist for Gannett News Service until he was convicted of voicemail hacking in an investigation into Chiquita's business practices. He began his career as a reporter at the Kalamazoo Gazette in Kalamazoo, Michigan.

== Career ==
In the 1980s, Gallagher was a reporter for the Lansing State Journal. There, he wrote a series about alleged drug smuggling in Michigan's prison system, for which the Federal Bureau of Investigation accused him of fabricating an anonymous source. The State Journal stood by Gallagher.

In 1987, Lawrence Beaupre hired Gallagher to work as a special investigative reporter at Gannett Suburban Newspapers in White Plains, New York. He left for Newsday but returned to White Plains within a year. During his time at Gannett Suburban, Gallagher was regarded among the paper's staff as a poor writer but a driven investigator. His high-profile stories included corruption at Rye Playland and the murder trial of Carolyn Warmus.

Beaupre took Gallagher with him to The Cincinnati Enquirer in June 1995. He reported and wrote a series the next year about problems with Fluor Daniel's cleanup of the uranium processing plant at Fernald Feed Materials Production Center. The Ohio Environmental Protection Agency and Fluor Daniel attempted unsuccessfully to get the Enquirer to print their rebuttals to Gallagher's claims. The series won the 1997 Best of Gannett award. Gallagher was also part of an investigation alleging an FBI investigation into contractor kickbacks benefiting Governor George Voinovich; the Justice Department denied the report.

== Chiquita controversy ==
In 1997, the Enquirer began an investigation into Cincinnati-based Chiquita Brands International, with Gallagher as the lead reporter and Cameron McWhirter, also formerly of Gannett Suburban, assisting in the investigation. Once Chiquita became aware of the Enquirer investigation, they retained Kirkland & Ellis, who warned of legal action if any information were to be obtained illegally. Enquirer lawyers and management became involved in the conduct of the investigation and wording of the eventual story. On May 1, 1998, Chiquita notified police that their voicemail system had been broken into up to 35 times a day, after the company's general counsel encountered a busy signal while checking his voicemail.

Two days later, on May 3, 1998, The Enquirer published an 18-page, 21-story special section, titled "Chiquita Secrets Revealed", that accused the fruit company of mistreating the workers on its Central American plantations, polluting the environment, allowing cocaine to be brought to America on its ships, bribing foreign officials, evading foreign nations' laws on land ownership, forcibly preventing its workers from unionizing, and a host of other misdeeds. According to an editor's note that accompanied the exposé, the yearlong investigation relied on visits to five countries, interviews with farmers and officials, internal Chiquita documents, and over 2,000 voicemail messages that were reportedly given to the paper by an authorized Chiquita executive.

Initially, national and local press reaction to the revelations was more muted than the investigative team had expected. Chiquita categorically denied the allegations but did not offer an explanation for the voicemails and internal documents. On May 14, Larry Birns of the Council on Hemispheric Affairs replayed some of the voicemail messages at a news conference. In response, Kirkland & Ellis sued Gallagher and threatened to sue the Enquirer as well. The Enquirer concluded that Gallagher had obtained the voicemail messages through voicemail hacking, rather than from an authorized Chiquita executive, as he had originally claimed. He had hacked into Chiquita's voicemail system despite being warned repeatedly by Enquirer editors and lawyers not to do so. According to McWhirter, he and his colleagues first got suspicious when Gallagher tried to push for "strange follow-up stories" about the investigation, and refused to give straight answers about his source to editors or outside lawyers. By mid-June, Gannett and the Enquirer began negotiating an out-of-court settlement with Chiquita.

Six weeks after the stories ran, Gannett reached a settlement with Chiquita, averting a lawsuit. Under the terms of the settlement, the Enquirer printed a front-page apology to Chiquita for three days beginning June 28, 1998, announcing Gallagher's termination and the retraction of the entire series. Gallagher had been fired for misconduct on June 26. Despite the retraction, publisher Harry M. Whipple said that he believed the voicemail messages to be real.

The Hamilton County sheriff's department appointed a special prosecutor to investigate Gallagher's alleged theft, because the elected district attorney had ties to Chiquita owner Carl Lindner Jr. (who previously owned the Enquirer). On September 24, 1998, Gallagher pleaded guilty to two felony counts of unlawfully tapping into Chiquita's voicemail. His two-and-a-half-year prison sentence was reduced to five years of probation and 200 hours of community service after he named George Ventura, a former Chiquita lawyer, as the Chiquita insider who gave Gallagher access to the voicemail system. In a 2008 article in the Columbia Journalism Review, McWhirter criticized Gallagher for waiving his reporter's privilege afforded under state shield law and divulging his sources in order to receive a more lenient sentence.

In 2001, Gannett confirmed that the 1998 settlement required the Enquirer to pay Chiquita $14 million, seal any materials used in preparing the special report, and bar McWhirter and editor Lawrence Beaupre from writing about Chiquita for five years. Beaupre, who had recruited Gallagher from White Plains, was transferred to Gannett headquarters for not following the paper's fact-checking procedures.

In an article examining the Chiquita series, Salon.com said the "Chiquita Secrets Revealed" series "presents a damning, carefully documented array of charges, most of them 'untainted' by those purloined executive voice mails." Salon.com also noted that while Chiquita never formally challenged Gallagher's allegations, it reportedly persuaded the Securities and Exchange Commission to stop an investigation into the company's practices sparked by the investigation.

Shortly after being fired, Gallagher moved to Saugatuck, Michigan, where he became the editor of Observer Newspapers, a chain of weekly local newspapers. On July 20, 2012, Gallagher's criminal record was sealed (effectively expunged) in Hamilton County Common Pleas Court. The controversy surrounding Gallagher has been compared to the News International phone hacking scandal.

In 2024, a Florida court ordered Chiquita Brands International to pay $38m to the families of several Colombian men murdered by a paramilitary death squad, according to The Guardian, after the company was shown to have financed the terrorist organization from 1997 to 2004.
