= Peter Bhatia =

American journalist and editor

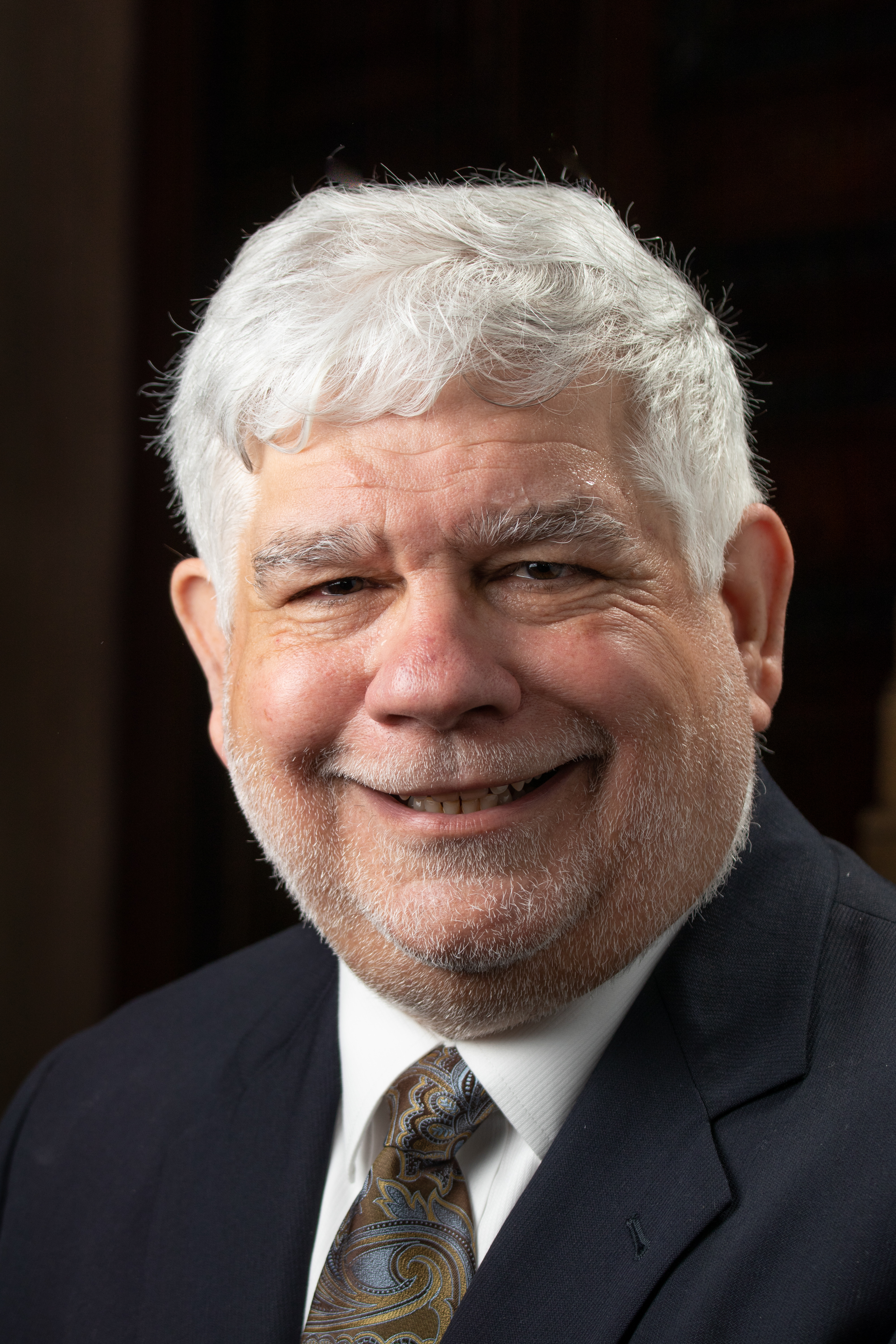
Bhatia in 2018

Peter Bhatia is an American journalist and CEO of Houston Landing, a nonprofit news site in Houston, Texas.

In his career, he was at various times the top editor of the Detroit Free Press, The Oregonian, and The Cincinnati Enquirer. Bhatia's father is from India while his mother is of Irish descent.
