= Washington McLean =

American journalist

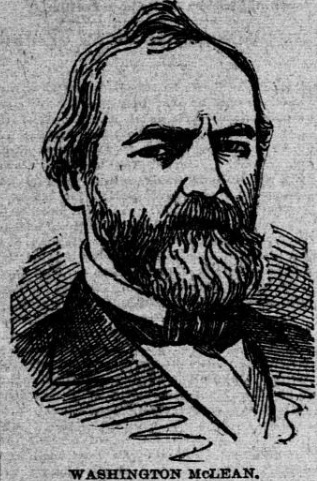
- Born: May 1816; Cincinnati, Ohio, U.S.
- Died: December 8, 1890 (aged 74); Washington, D.C., U.S.
- Resting place: Rock Creek Cemetery; Washington, D.C., U.S.
- Known for: Cincinnati Enquirer
- Spouse: Mary L. McLean
- Children: John Roll, Mary, Mildred

Washington McLean (May 1816 – December 8, 1890) was an American businessman of Scottish ancestry best known as the owner of the Cincinnati Enquirer newspaper. Born in Cincinnati, Ohio, in 1848 Washington McLean and his brother S.B.W. McLean acquired a share position in the Cincinnati Enquirer to be partners with editor James J. Faran. Washington McLean bought out Faran in the 1860s and in 1872 sold a half interest in the newspaper to his son.

McLean and his wife Mary had three children. Their son, John, purchased his father's remaining fifty percent in the Cincinnati Enquirer in 1881 and went on to acquire The Washington Post in 1905. Their daughter, Mildred "Millie" McLean (1845–1931), was married in 1871 to General William Babcock Hazen. Widowed, she remarried in 1899 to Admiral George Dewey.

Washington McLean was a prominent member of the Democratic Party and served as chairman of the Ohio Democratic State central committee in 1853. In 1882, he moved to Washington, D.C., but maintained a legal residency in Cincinnati. In the nation's capital, he made large and successful investments in real estate that expanded his wealth. He died there on December 8, 1890, and although initially was to be returned to Cincinnati for burial, he was interred in a mausoleum in Washington's Rock Creek Cemetery. Mary McLean died on December 9, 1900, in her 72nd year, and was interred with him.
