= Lansing State Journal =

Daily newspaper in Lansing, Michigan

- Type: Daily newspaper
- Format: Broadsheet
- Owner: USA Today Co.
- Editor: Stephanie Angel
- Founded: April 28, 1855; 171 years ago
- Headquarters: 300 South Washington Sq., Ste 300; Lansing, MI 48933; United States
- Circulation: 2,363 Digital Subscribers; 24,298 daily 33,766 Sunday (as of 2022)
- ISSN: 0274-9742
- Website: lansingstatejournal.com

The Lansing State Journal is a daily newspaper published in Lansing, Michigan, owned by USA Today Co. It is the sole daily newspaper published in Greater Lansing. The Lansing State Journal is excluded from the Wayback Machine.

== History ==
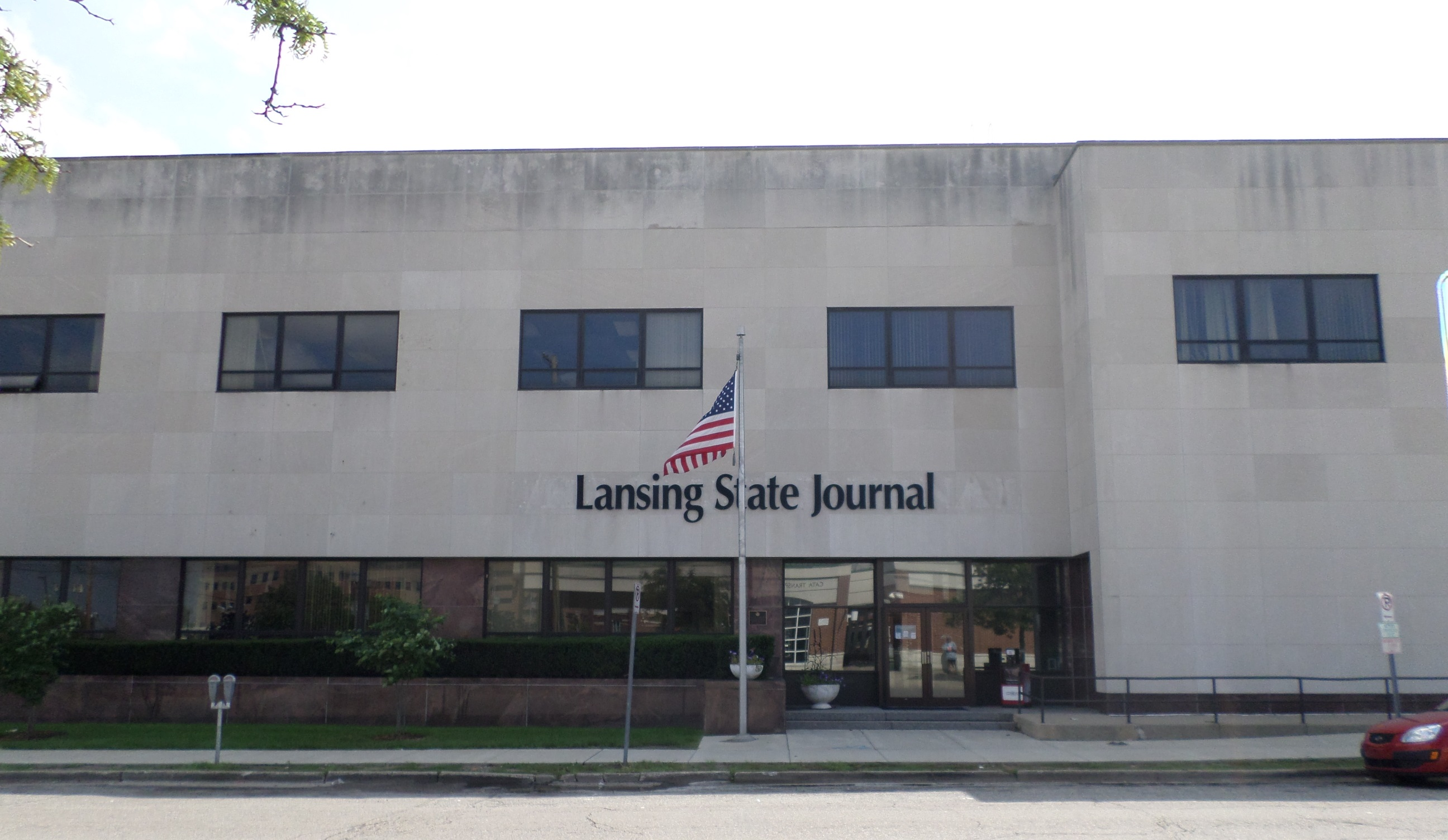
Former Lansing State Journal headquarters from 1951 to 2016

The paper was started as the Lansing Republican on April 28, 1855, to advance the causes of the newly founded Republican Party in Michigan. Founder and publisher Henry Barnes completed only two issues of the weekly abolitionist publication before selling it and returning to Detroit.

According to the Pioneer History of Ingham County, "In a few weeks, Barnes sold his interests to Herman E. Haskill. Shortly after Haskill made this purchase he met with a great disappointment. He was not appointed State Printer. Two men, Fitch and Hosmer, got the appointment, and Haskill sold his interests to them, and they published the paper in connection with the State printing. In 1857, Fitch sold his interests to John A. Kerr, and the firm's name was changed to Kerr & Hosmer. I can remember the two men and the old red building on West Michigan Avenue where the State printing and binding was done, and this paper was published. It had a long sign on the roof that informed the passerby that it was the State Bindery and Republican Office."

Over the next 50 years, the paper saw many name changes and many different owners, finally merging with the rival Lansing Journal forming The Lansing Journal-Republican with the January 23, 1911 edition. Three weeks later with the February 13, 1911 edition, the paper officially became The State Journal in an effort to be "unbiased and uninfluenced by the political views or aims of any party." The first Sunday edition was published on September 27, 1936. Gannett bought the paper in 1971, and it became the Lansing State Journal on August 25, 1980. On April 15, 1985, it became a morning publication, rather than an afternoon one. In January 2016, the LSJ moved from its Lenawee Street headquarters building to the 3rd floor of the Knapp's Centre building.

In March 2022, The Lansing Journal moved to a six day printing schedule, eliminating its printed Saturday edition.

== Notable people ==
Former contributors:

- Michael Gallagher – reporter
